= Eurasian Economic Union =

Trade bloc of five post-Soviet states

(in other national languages)
Belarusian	Еўразійскі эканамічны саюз
Armenian	Եվրասիական տնտեսական միություն
Kazakh	Eurazialyq Ekonomikalyq Odaq
Kyrgyz	Евразиялык экономикалык биримдик
Russian	Евразийский экономический союз
- Flag Coat of arms

- Member states Disputed territory of Crimea
- Administrative centres: Moscow, Russia (Commission); Minsk, Belarus (Court)
- Largest city: Moscow; 55°45′N 37°37′E
- Working language: Russian
- Type: Economic union
- Member states: Member states: Armenia; Belarus; Kazakhstan; Kyrgyzstan; Russia; Observers: Cuba; Iran; Moldova; Uzbekistan

Leaders
  - Chairman of the Supreme Eurasian Economic Council (2026): (Kazakhstan) Kassym-Jomart Tokayev
  - Chairman of the Board of the Eurasian Economic Commission: (Kazakhstan) Bakhytjan Sagintayev

Establishment
  - Original proposal^{a}: 1994
  - Economic Community: 10 October 2000
  - Eurasian Customs Union: 1 January 2010
  - Establishment agreed: 18 November 2011
  - Eurasian Economic Space: 1 January 2012
  - EAEU Treaty signed: 29 May 2014
  - EAEU established: 1 January 2015

Area
  - Total: 20,229,248 km^{2} (7,810,556 sq mi)

Population
  - 2025 estimate: ▲190,336,992
  - Density: 9.16/km^{2} (23.7/sq mi)
- GDP (PPP): 2026 estimate
  - Total: ▲US$9.0 trillion
  - Per capita: $48,967
- GDP (nominal): 2026 estimate
  - Total: ▲US$3.17 trillion
  - Per capita: $17,276
- Currency: Armenian dram; Belarusian ruble; Kazakhstani tenge; Kyrgyz som; Russian ruble
- Time zone: UTC+2 to +12
- Calling code: 4 codes: (Russia) (Kazakhstan) +7; (Armenia) +374; (Belarus) +375; (Kyrgyzstan) +996
- Internet TLD: 5 TLDs: (Armenia) .am; (Belarus) .by; (Kyrgyzstan) .kg; (Kazakhstan) .kz; (Russia) .ru
- Website; EAEUnion.org
- 1. By Kazakhstani president Nursultan Nazarbayev.

The Eurasian Economic Union (EAEU or EEU) (Note: EAEU is the acronym used on the organisation's website. However, many media outlets use the acronym EEU.) is an economic union of five post-Soviet states located in Eurasia. The EAEU has an integrated single market. As of 2023, it consists of 183 million people and a gross domestic product of over $2.4 trillion.

The Treaty on the Eurasian Economic Union was signed on 29 May 2014 by the leaders of Belarus, Kazakhstan, and Russia, and came into force on 1 January 2015. Treaties aiming for Armenia's and Kyrgyzstan's accession to the Eurasian Economic Union were signed on 9 October and 23 December 2014, respectively. Armenia's accession treaty came into force on 2 January 2015. Kyrgyzstan's accession treaty came into effect on 6 August 2015. Kyrgyzstan participated in the EAEU from the day of its establishment as an acceding state.

The EAEU encourages the free movement of goods and services, and provides for common policies in the macroeconomic sphere, transport, industry and agriculture, energy, foreign trade and investment, customs, technical regulation, competition, and antitrust regulation. Provisions for a single currency and greater integration are envisioned for the future. The union operates through supranational and intergovernmental institutions. The Supreme Eurasian Economic Council is the supreme body of the Union, consisting of the Heads of the Member States. The second level of intergovernmental institutions is represented by the Eurasian Intergovernmental Council (consisting of the Heads of the governments of member states). The day-to-day work of the EAEU is done through the Eurasian Economic Commission, the executive body of the Union. There is also a judicial body – the Court of the Eurasian Economic Union.

== History ==
=== Background ===
In the Soviet Union, a Union Republic was a constituent federated political entity with a system of government called a Soviet republic, which was officially defined in the 1977 constitution as "a sovereign Soviet socialist state which has united with the other Soviet republics to form the Union of Soviet Socialist Republics" and whose sovereignty is limited by membership in the Union. As a result of its status as a sovereign state, the Union Republic de jure had the right to enter into relations with foreign states, conclude treaties with them and exchange diplomatic and consular representatives and participate in the activities of international organisations (including membership in international organisations). The former Soviet republics that became independent states were part of the economy of the Soviet Union with its common technical standards, common infrastructure, territorial proximity, chains of cooperation, and common legal heritage. Through the signing of international agreements on trade, economic cooperation and integration, countries can achieve an increase in the efficiency of their economies, which suffered due to the disintegration of the Soviet Union. At the same time, all post-Soviet countries have moved to a market economy, implemented reforms and expanded trade and cooperation with the global economy. Over the past three decades, several negotiations have taken place on proposed integration projects.

In order to reform the Soviet Union, the New Union Treaty and the draft European-Asian Union, among others, were proposed. In 1989, the European-Asian Union was proposed by the co-chairman of the Interregional Deputy Group Andrei Sakharov, Nobel Peace Prize laureate, and with the participation of members of the group Galina Starovoitova (as a representative to the Congress of People's Deputies of the Soviet Union from Armenia), Anatoly Sobchak and others. Sakharov presented Gorbachev (Gorbachev was a chairman of the Constitutional Commission) with his draft Constitution of the Union of Soviet Republics of Europe and Asia on 27 November 1989.

In the 1990s, Russia and the Central Asian republics were weakened economically and faced declines in GDP as a result of the collapse of the Soviet Union. The member states of the union underwent economic reforms and privatisation. The process of Eurasian integration began immediately after the break-up of the Soviet Union. When the USSR began to fall in 1991, the presidents of Belarus, Kazakhstan and Russia of the founding republics signed the Belavezha Accords on 8 December 1991, declaring that the Soviet Union would cease to exist and proclaimed the Commonwealth of Independent States in its place.

=== Commonwealth of Independent States ===
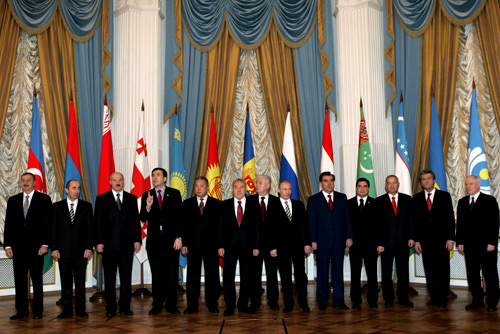
Meeting of the leaders of all 12 countries of the Commonwealth of Independent States (CIS) on 22 February 2008. The CIS initiated the lengthy process of Eurasian integration.

According to Article 7 of the Agreement on the creation the Commonwealth of Independent States of 8 December 1991 which effectively dissolved the Soviet Union as a single federal country, the High Contracting Parties indicate that through common coordinating institutions, their joint activities will consist in coordinating foreign policy activities, cooperation in the formation and development of a common economic space, common European and Eurasian markets, in the field of customs policy, in the development of transport and communication systems, cooperation in the field of environmental protection, migration policy and the fight against organised crime. According to the Article 5 of Belavezha Accords, the High Contracting Parties shall recognise and respect each other's territorial integrity and the inviolability of existing borders within the Commonwealth. They shall guarantee the openness of borders, freedom of movement of citizens and freedom of information within the Commonwealth.

On 24 September 1993, at a meeting of the Commonwealth of Independent States (CIS) Council of Heads of State in Moscow, Azerbaijan, Armenia, Belarus, Kazakhstan, Kyrgyzstan, Moldova, Russia, Tajikistan, Uzbekistan signed the Treaty on the Creation of the Economic Union which reinforces by an international agreement the intention to create an economic union through the step-by-step creation of a free trade area, a customs union and conditions for the free movement of goods, services, capital and labor. All these countries have ratified the Treaty and it entered into force on 14 January 1994. Turkmenistan and Georgia joined in 1994 and ratified the Treaty, but Georgia withdrew in 2009. On 24 September 1993, Armenia, Azerbaijan, Belarus, Kazakhstan, Kyrgyzstan, Moldova, Russia, Tajikistan, Uzbekistan, Ukraine and Georgia signed the Agreement on the Creation of the interstate Euroasian Coal and Metal Community, which entered into force in 1995 for Kazakhstan, Moldova, Russia, Tajikistan, Uzbekistan, and in 1996 entered into force for Belarus, Kyrgyzstan and Ukraine. The Euroasian Coal and Metal Community was terminated on 29 September 2004.

On 15 April 1994, the "Agreement on Ukraine's accession to the Economic Union as an associate member" was signed by Azerbaijan, Armenia, Belarus, Kazakhstan, Kyrgyzstan, Moldova, Russia, Tajikistan, Turkmenistan, Uzbekistan, Ukraine and Georgia but never entered into force due to non-ratification by Russia, Ukraine, Turkmenistan and Georgia, although all the others ratified. On 15 April 1994, at a meeting of the Commonwealth of Independent States (CIS) Council of Heads of State in Moscow, all 12 post-Soviet states signed the international Agreement on the Establishment of a Free Trade Area in order to move towards the creation of an economic union. Article 17 also confirmed the intention to conclude a free trade agreement in services. Article 1 indicated that this was "the first stage of the creation of the Economic Union", but on 2 April 1999 the countries agreed to remove this phrase from the agreement.

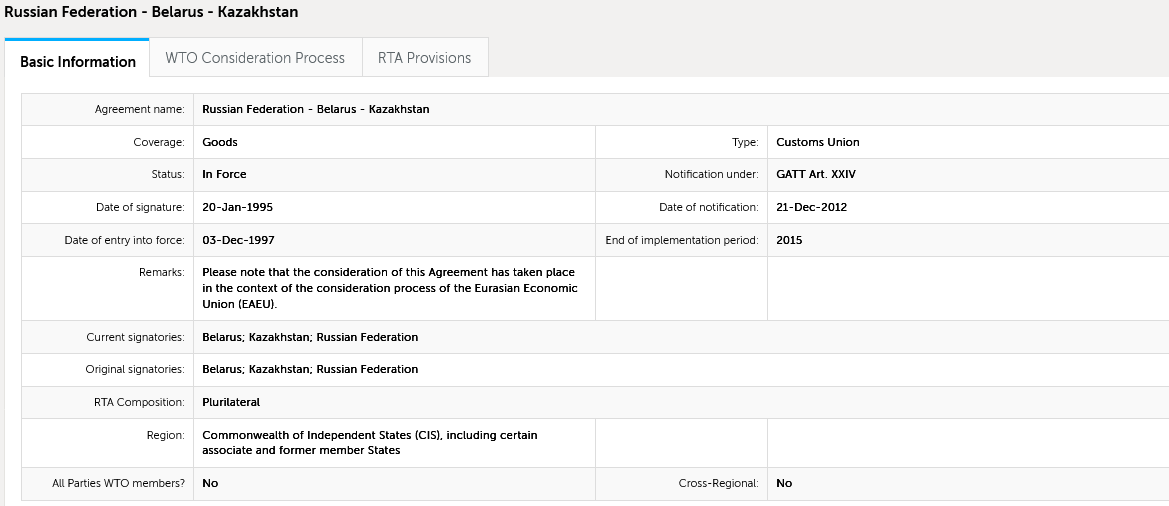
Russian Federation - Belarus - Kazakhstan Agreement of 1995 on Customs Union in the Regional Trade Agreements Database of the World Trade Organization

=== Proposal to establish a new organisation ===
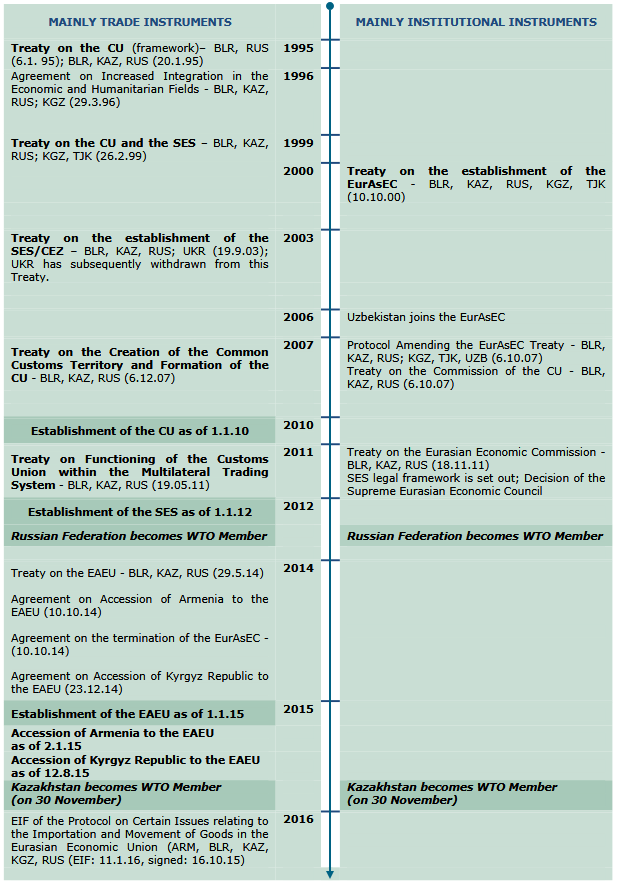
Timeline of EAEU Integration from the World Trade Organization report

At a press conference of Commonwealth leaders in Almaty on 21 December 1991, Leonid Kravchuk refused to change the name of the organisation to the name Commonwealth of Euro-Asian and Independent States, but Nursultan Nazarbayev immediately stressed: "in the Declaration the economic area (of the CIS) is called Eurasian." A number of agreements with the names "Eurasian", "Euro-Asian" or "Euroasian" have been signed in the CIS, such as the establishment of the Euro-Asian Council for Standardization, Metrology and Certification and the Euroasian Broadcasting Union in 1992, the Eurasian Patent Convention and Organization in 1994, and the Eurasian Cinema Academy in 1997.

On 29 March 1994, during a speech at Moscow State University, the first President of Kazakhstan, Nursultan Nazarbayev complained that the CIS was inadequate and did not provide the integration that the countries badly needed. He proposed the creation of a Eurasian Union of States as a new organisation completely separate from the CIS. The Eurasian Union of States was proposed as a combination of the economic union and political union. For the first time it was suggested to use the name "Eurasian" for an economic union rather than "Euro-Asian" or "Euroasian". The Eurasian Economic Union traces its history back to Nazarbayev's proposal. He suggested the idea of creating a Union as a regional trade bloc in order to connect to and profit from the growing economies of Europe and East Asia. The vision would be to simplify the free flow of goods across Eurasia. The idea was quickly seen as a way to bolster trade, boost investment in Central Asia, Armenia and Belarus, and serve as a complement to the Eastern Partnership.

However, earlier, on 22 March 1994, Nazarbayev spoke at the Chatham House in London with an analysis of trends in post-Soviet integration and a justification for the need to create a new effective and truly functioning union based on an integration core with the possible name "Euro-Asian Union". The union should be built around three main pillars: common supranational bodies for managing the economy, defence and foreign policy, a single economic space and a common defence complex. The president of Kazakhstan launched an information campaign. On 3 June 1994, he signed the Plan on the Formation of the Eurasian Union of States, which was sent to all the heads of the CIS participant states. On 6 June 1994, a press conference was held at the presidential residence by Marat Tajin, head of the Information and Analytical Centre of the Presidential Administration of Kazakhstan and Imangali Tasmagambetov, Nazarbayev's assistant. Marat Tajin spoke at a round table discussion on Prospects for Eurasian Integration in Moscow on 14 June 1994 at the Diplomatic Academy of the Russian Ministry of Foreign Affairs. At a hearing in the State Duma of the Russian Federation in Moscow on 5 July 1994, Ambassador Tair Mansurov outlined the essence of the project. Nazarbayev later complained that in 1994 "there was complete rejection" of his idea: "I hoped for the support of Russia and Yeltsin personally, however, there was no such support and the attitude was one of sarcasm." Thus, the work was carried out within the framework of the CIS and separate treaties without the creation of a new organisation.

=== Customs union and integration in economic and humanitarian fields ===
During the 1990s, the Eurasian integration process was slow, possibly due to the economic crisis experienced after the dissolution of the Soviet Union and the size of the countries involved (Russia, Belarus and Kazakhstan cover an area of about 20 million km^{2}). As a result, numerous treaties have been signed by member states to establish the regional trade bloc gradually.

On 20 January 1995, Belarus, Kazakhstan, Russia, and later acceding states Kyrgyzstan and Tajikistan signed the first agreements on the establishment of a Customs Union. Its purpose was to gradually lead the way toward the creation of open borders without passport controls between member states.

On 29 March 1996, Belarus, Kazakhstan, Russia and Kyrgyzstan signed the Treaty on Increased Integration in the Economic and Humanitarian Fields to begin economic integration between countries to allow for the creation of common markets for goods, services, capital, labour, and developing single transport, energy and information systems. According to the WTO database, the date of signature of the document establishing the Eurasian Economic Community is indicated as 29 March 1996.

On 26 February 1999, Belarus, Kazakhstan, Russia, Kyrgyzstan and Tajikistan signed the Treaty on the Customs Union and the Single Economic Space by clarifying the goals and policies the states would undertake in order to form the Eurasian Customs Union and the Single Economic Space.

=== Eurasian Economic Community and supranational competence ===
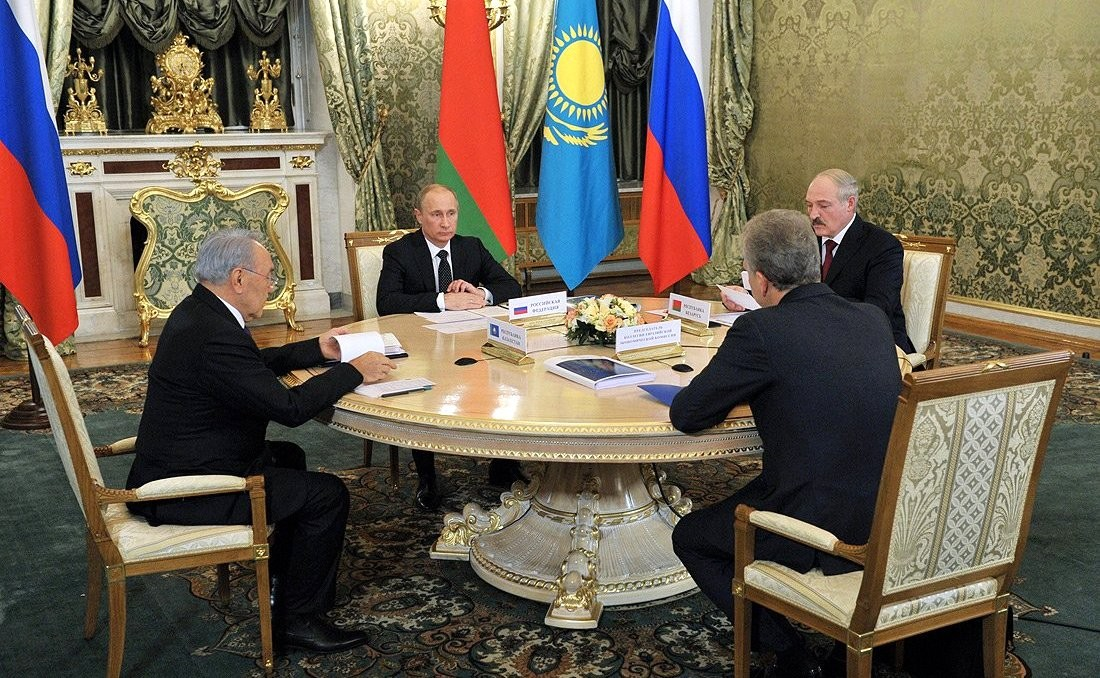
A session of the Supreme Eurasian Economic Council (composed of the union's heads of state) is held at least once every year.

To promote further economic integration and more cooperation, on 10 October 2000 Belarus, Kazakhstan, Russia, Kyrgyzstan and Tajikistan established the Eurasian Economic Community (EurAsEC) which Uzbekistan joined in 2006. The EurAsEC headquarters according to the Treaty were located in Moscow and Astana. The treaty established a common market for its member states. The Eurasian Economic Community was modelled on the European Economic Community. The two had a comparable population size of 171 million and 169 million, respectively.

The separate Treaty on a Single Economic Space by Belarus, Kazakhstan, Russia and Ukraine (or Common Economic Zone Agreement), signed in 2003 and entered into force in 2004, with proposed headquarters in Kiev was in the process of implementation, but it was stalled after the Orange revolution and new president of Ukraine. Ukraine has not been involved in previous agreements and treaties. It was decided to proceed without Ukraine after 2005. The withdrawal of Ukraine from this Treaty de jure took effect on 21 July 2023.

In 2007, Belarus, Kazakhstan and Russia signed an agreement to create a Customs Union between the three countries. The supranational commission of the customs union was established and given supranational competencies.

=== Common external tariff and Customs Code ===
The Customs Union of Belarus, Kazakhstan, and Russia (now the Customs Union of the Eurasian Economic Union) came into existence on 1 January 2010. The Customs Union's priorities were the elimination of intra-bloc tariffs, establishing a common external tariff policy and the elimination of non-tariff barriers. It was launched as a first step towards forming a broader single market inspired by the European Union, with the objective of forming an alliance between former Soviet states. The member states planned to continue with economic integration and were set to remove all customs borders between each other after July 2011.

=== Four economic freedoms and Eurasian Economic Commission ===
The signing ceremony of the Treaty on the Eurasian Economic Union (in Astana, Kazakhstan, on 29 May 2014)

On 1 January 2012, the three states established the Eurasian Economic Space which ensures the effective functioning of a single market for goods, services, capital and labour, and to establish coherent industrial, transport, energy and agricultural policies. The agreement included a roadmap for future integration and established the Eurasian Economic Commission (modelled on the European Commission). The Eurasian Economic Commission serves as the regulatory agency for the Eurasian Customs Union, the Single Economic Space and the Eurasian Economic Union.

In 2011, the then-Prime Minister of Russia, Vladimir Putin, announced his support for Nursultan Nazarbayev's idea for the creation of a Eurasian Economic Union. On 18 November 2011, the presidents of Belarus, Kazakhstan, and Russia signed an agreement setting a target of establishing the Eurasian Economic Union by 2015. The member states put together a joint commission on fostering closer economic ties.

On 29 May 2014, the presidents of Kazakhstan, Belarus and Russia signed the treaty on the Eurasian Economic Union, which came into effect on 1 January 2015. The presidents of Armenia and Kyrgyzstan were also present at the signing ceremony. Russian president Vladimir Putin stated, "Today we have created a powerful, attractive centre of economic development, a big regional market that unites more than 170 million people." Kazakh politicians emphasised the Eurasian Economic Union was not intended to be a political bloc, but a purely economic union. Bakytzhan Sagintayev, the first deputy prime minister of Kazakhstan and lead negotiator, said, "We are not creating a political organisation; we are forming a purely economic union." He further stated "it is a pragmatic means to get benefits. We don't meddle into what Russia is doing politically, and they cannot tell us what foreign policy to pursue." By October, the treaty had received parliamentary approval from all three states. On 9 October 2014, a Treaty to enlarge the EAEU to Armenia was signed. Kyrgyzstan signed the Treaty on 23 December 2014 and became a member of the Eurasian Union on 6 August 2015.

=== Treaty on the Eurasian Economic Union ===
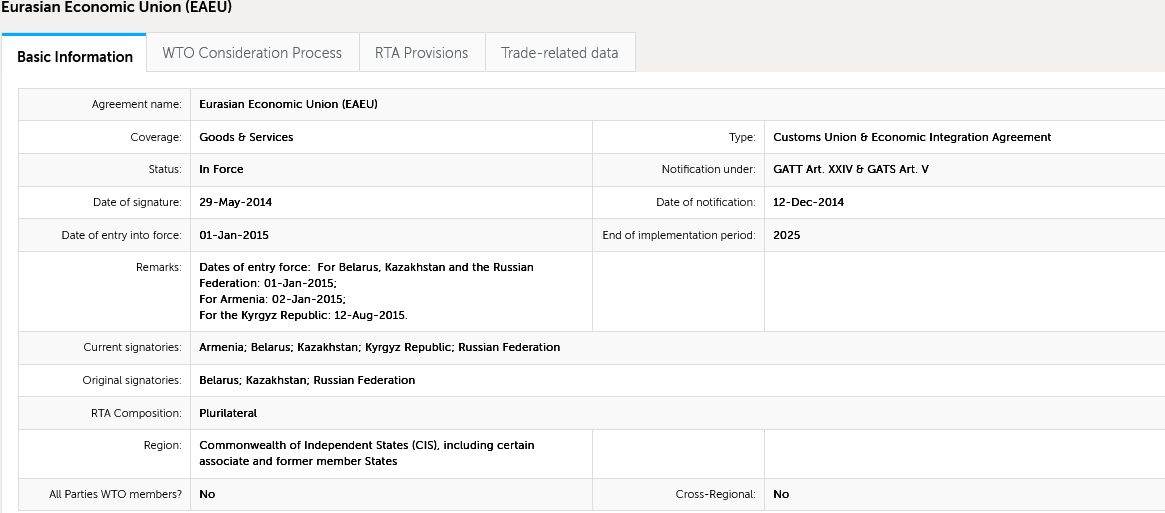
The Eurasian Economic Union in the Regional Trade Agreements Database of the World Trade Organization

The Treaty on the Eurasian Economic Union (EAEU Treaty) entered into force on 1 January 2015.

Many provisions and separate agreements were codified, consolidated and incorporated into the EAEU Treaty and the EAEU's legal framework (officially "EAEU Treaty and international agreements within the EAEU" according to the database of law of the Eurasian Economic Union), some agreements were terminated and replaced, but some older agreements are still in force in part not contrary to the Treaty on the Eurasian Economic Union (officially "Other international treaties" according to the database of law of the Eurasian Economic Union). The Customs Union of the Eurasian Economic Union is now regulated by Part Two of the Treaty on the Eurasian Economic Union (which entered into force on 1 January 2015), EAEU Customs Code, other international agreements and by decisions of supranational bodies as Supreme Eurasian Economic Council, Intergovernmental Council and Eurasian Economic Commission.

The Eurasian Economic Community was terminated on 1 January 2015.

On 29 May 2019, during a meeting of the Supreme Eurasian Economic Council, a decision was made to award Nursultan Nazarbayev the title of Honorary Chairman of the Supreme Eurasian Economic Council. At the meeting, Kyrgyz president Jeenbekov called Nazarbayev the successor to the great Eurasians Nikolai Trubetskoy and Lev Gumilyov: "Many great people dreamed of Eurasianism. Prince Nikolai Sergeevich Trubetskoy was the first to say this in 1921. Later, Lev Nikolaevich Gumilev developed the idea of combining ethnic groups and landscapes. And only the respected Nursultan Abishevich Nazarbayev managed to make Trubetskoy and Gumilev's dream come true. Twenty-five years ago, the respected Nursultan Abishevich voiced the idea and created the foundation for the formation of Eurasian integration."

== Structural evolution ==
Treaties and development stages of Eurasian Economic Union
Year	Signed documents
1995	Treaty on the Customs Union between Belarus and Russia
1995	Treaty on the Customs Union between Kazakhstan and Russia
1996	Agreement on Deepening Integration in Economic and Humanitarian Spheres Belarus, Kazakhstan, Russia, Kyrgyzstan
1999	Treaty on the Customs Union and the Single Economic Space Belarus, Kazakhstan, Russia, Kyrgyzstan, Tajikistan (Agreement to complete the formation of the Customs Union and the Single Economic Space)
2000	Treaty on the establishment of the Eurasian Economic Community (EurAsEC) Belarus, Kazakhstan, Russia, Kyrgyzstan, Tajikistan
2003	Treaty on forming the Single Economic Space Belarus, Kazakhstan, Russia, Ukraine
2007	Treaty on the Commission of the Customs Union Belarus, Kazakhstan, Russia
2007	Treaty on the Establishment of the Integrated Customs Territory and Creation of the Customs Union Belarus, Kazakhstan, Russia
2010	Establishment of the Customs Union Belarus, Kazakhstan, Russia
2011	Treaty on the Eurasian Economic Commission Belarus, Kazakhstan, Russia
2011	The decision of the Supreme Eurasian Economic Council on the entry of international agreements into force forming the legal base of the Customs Union and Single Economic Space Belarus, Kazakhstan, Russia
2011	Declaration on Eurasian Economic Integration Belarus, Kazakhstan, Russia
2012	Establishment of the Single Economic Space Belarus, Kazakhstan, Russia
2012	Eurasian Economic Commission started functioning
2015	Establishment of the Eurasian Economic Union
2015	Treaty on the Eurasian Economic Union

Structural evolution of the Eurasian Economic Union

Signed; Effective; Agreement	1991; 1991—1994; Agreement on creation of the Commonwealth of Independent States	1996; 1996; Agreement on Deepening Integration in Economic and Humanitarian Spheres	2000; 2001; Treaty on the Establishment of the Eurasian Economic Community	2007; 2010; Treaty on the Establishment of the Integrated Customs Territory and Creation of the Customs Union	2007 and 2011; 2012; Declaration on Eurasian Economic Integration	2014; 2015; Treaty on the Eurasian Economic Union
						Eurasian Economic Union (EAEU)
					Single Economic Space	Eurasian Economic Union (EAEU)
				Customs Union		Eurasian Economic Union (EAEU)
			Eurasian Economic Community (EAEC)			Eurasian Economic Union (EAEU)
		Deepening Integration in Economic and Humanitarian Spheres
	Commonwealth of Independent States (CIS)

== Membership ==
Member states of the Eurasian Economic Union Observer states Candidate states

Country	Accession date	Date of signature
Armenia	2 January 2015	10 October 2014
Belarus	1 January 2015	29 May 2014
Kazakhstan	1 January 2015	29 May 2014
Kyrgyzstan	12 August 2015	23 December 2014
Russia	1 January 2015	29 May 2014

The treaty establishing the Eurasian Economic Union was formally signed by three states which were part of the former Soviet Union: Belarus, Kazakhstan, and Russia. Agreements to enlarge the EAEU to the other post-Soviet states of Armenia and Kyrgyzstan were signed on 9 October and 23 December 2014, respectively. For Kyrgyzstan, facilitation of labour migration regulations with Russia was seen as the main benefit of joining the Eurasian Economic Union. The population migration indicator had an inverse dependence with GDP per capita, consumer price index, minimum wage, and unemployment rate.

Armenia announced its decision to join the Eurasian Customs Union in September 2013. President Serj Sargsyan announced the decision after talks with his Russian counterpart President Vladimir Putin in Moscow. The treaty enlarging the EAEU to Armenia was signed on 9 October 2014. By signing this contract, Armenia has accepted corresponding application, and thereby gained access to the EAEU single market with a population of 170 million citizens. Armenia is the only country of the EAEU that has no common border with the other member states of the union. Georgia guaranteed a free transit corridor for exporting its goods to the Eurasian Economic Union, Armenian deputy economic minister Emil Tarasyan stated.

Moldova was granted observer status in April 2017.

Uzbekistan and Cuba became designated observer members officially on 11 December 2020. In December 2022, Russian prime minister Mishustin mentioned the advantages of Uzbek full membership in EAEU. By February 2023, Uzbek prime minister Aripov announced the completion of the preparatory work to ensure harmonisation of national technical regulations with the EAEU standards.

Iran was designated as an observer member by the leaders of the five Eurasian Union member states during a meeting in St. Petersburg on 26 December 2024. The event was also attended by Mohammad Atabek, Iran's Minister of Industry, Mines, and Trade. According to Bakytjan Sagintayev, Chairman of the Eurasian Economic Commission, Iranian exports to the Eurasian Union rose by 8 percent, while imports from the Union to Iran experienced a 16 percent increase.

On 12 February 2025, Armenia's parliament approved a bill officially endorsing Armenia's EU accession. In response, Russian Deputy Prime Minister Alexey Overchuk stated "the EU accession process will mark the beginning of Armenia's withdrawal from the Eurasian Economic Union." In January 2026, Armenian Prime Minister Nikol Pashinyan said that the country would remain a member of the EEU for the time being, but would need to withdraw before joining the EU as it would not be possible to be a member of both organizations simultaneously. At their summit in May 2026, the leaders of the other EAEU member states issued a joint statement which warned that Armenia's preparations to join the EU posed "significant risks to the economic security", and announced that they would prepare a report for the Supreme Eurasian Economic Council in December 2026 on the potential suspension of Armenia from the EAEU. The leaders also called for Armenia to hold a referendum allowing citizens to decide whether to join the EU or remain a member of the EAEU.

=== Presidency ===
Each year, a member state is elected chairman to head the Union. Chairmanship is passed from country to country in alphabetical order in the Russian language. Belarus currently holds the chairmanship.

Year	#	Country	Head of state or government	Major trade agreements
2015	1st	Belarus	Alexander Lukashenko	Vietnam
2016	2nd	Kazakhstan	Nursultan Nazarbayev	none
2017	3rd	Kyrgyzstan	Almazbek Atambayev (until 1 December)	none
2017	3rd	Kyrgyzstan	Sooronbay Jeenbekov (from 1 December)	none
2018	4th	Russia	Vladimir Putin	China, Iran
2019	5th	Armenia	Nikol Pashinyan	Serbia, Singapore
2020	6th	Belarus	Alexander Lukashenko	
2021	7th	Kazakhstan	Kassym-Jomart Tokayev	
2022	8th	Kyrgyzstan	Sadyr Japarov	
2023	9th	Russia	Vladimir Putin	
2024	10th	Armenia	Nikol Pashinyan	
2025	11th	Belarus	Alexander Lukashenko	

=== Enlargement ===
Russian president Vladimir Putin has stated that Russia's goal was to enlarge the customs union to all post-Soviet states, excluding the three Baltic EU member states. According to The Guardian newspaper, Russia's plan is for the Eurasian Union to grow into a "powerful, supra-national union" of sovereign states like the European Union, uniting economies, legal systems, customs services, and military capabilities to form a bridge between Europe and Asia to balance the EU and the U.S.

In May 2015, an integration agreement was signed between the Russian Federation and South Ossetia. If South Ossetia were to join, it would be by acceding to the Russian Federation. In 2023, South Ossetia began implementing and integrating the EAEU's common tariffs.

Tajikistan was formally invited to join the union and has expressed its interest in acceding. It is recognised as a potential candidate and membership negotiations are underway. In 2015, further efforts were made to integrate Tajikistan into the EAEU.

It took Europe 40 years to move from the European Coal and Steel Community to the full European Union. The establishment of the Customs Union and the Common Economic Space is proceeding at a much faster pace because we could draw on the experience of the EU and other regional associations. We see their strengths and weaknesses. And this is our obvious advantage since it means we are in a position to avoid mistakes and unnecessary bureaucratic superstructures.

— Vladimir Putin, "A new integration project for Eurasia: The future in the making", Izvestia, 3 October 2011

Uzbekistan has been hesitant to join the Economic Union, with Uzbek officials making opposing claims on the prospect of integration. Originally, the country preferred not to pursue economic and political integration. Russian officials have stated that integration with the country would be slow and analysts state that as Russian influence and trade increases in Kyrgyzstan and Tajikistan it may persuade Uzbekistan to join in the future. Uzbekistan began its integration process when Russia announced it would write off US$865 million of debt owed by the country. Uzbekistan joined the Commonwealth of Independent States Free Trade Area in 2014, meaning it has free trade with EAEU member states. According to some sources, Uzbekistan does not intend to become a full member of the EAEU, due to Uzbekistan's neutrality which is enshrined in the country's legislation. In March 2020, Uzbekistan announced that it wished to become a Eurasian Union observer state. In September 2023, Uzbekistan estimated that it will join EAEU in 2–3 years. In October 2024, the chair of a parliamentary commission examining the potential for Uzbekistan to join the EAEU as a full member stated that "our conclusion is that Uzbekistan is best served by maintaining its observer status."

Moldova, Ukraine and Georgia have been offered by both the European Union and the Eurasian Economic Union to join their integration unions. All three countries signed Association Agreements with the EU on 21 March 2014. However, break-away regions of Moldova (Transnistria), Ukraine (Donetsk and Luhansk) and Georgia (South Ossetia and Abkhazia) have expressed a desire to join the Eurasian Customs Union and integrate into the Eurasian Economic Union.

Ukraine submitted an application to participate in the Eurasian Economic Union as an observer in August 2013. Viktor Yanukovych's decision to abandon an association agreement with the European Union and exclusively pursue integration with the EAEU was a key factor in the Euromaidan protests that ended his term as president of Ukraine followed by annexation of Crimea by Russia. The country's membership in the EAEU was seen by some analysts as the key to the success of the union as Ukraine has the second largest economy of any of the 15 former republics of the Soviet Union. With high tensions between Russia and Ukraine in the wake of the crisis, Ukraine decided to pursue integration with the EU.

Turkey was extended an invitation to join the EAEU by Kazakhstan's President Nursultan Nazarbayev on 6 June 2014 but the country prefers to join the EU.

Georgia's prime minister Bidzina Ivanishvili said in September 2013 he was studying the possibility of acceding to the Union, although he later clarified that Georgia's main strategy was still to integrate into the European Union. Russia's prime minister Dmitri Medvedev included Georgia as a prospective member in statements made in August 2013.

The member states of the EAEU have reached an agreement with China to conjunct the EAEU with the Belt and Road Initiative, opting for collaboration instead of competition. There is also significant cooperation between the EAEU and China in the areas of high technology and digitalisation.

In 2018, Moldova became the EAEU's first observer state, and attended EAEU forums for a few years; however, it has not attended any more EAEU meetings since the full-scale Russian invasion of Ukraine began in February 2022. Russia's military aggression decisively moved Moldova on a path to EU membership instead, with Moldova's former Defence Minister Anatol Șalaru noting in August 2024 that trading with the EAEU would be practically impossible. In October 2024, none of the main presidential candidates even mentioned the Eurasian Economic Union; each of them regarded membership of the European Union as inevitable. Furthermore, as of February 2025, Uzbekistan and Tajikistan were resisting full membership of the EAEU as well.

== Politics and governance ==
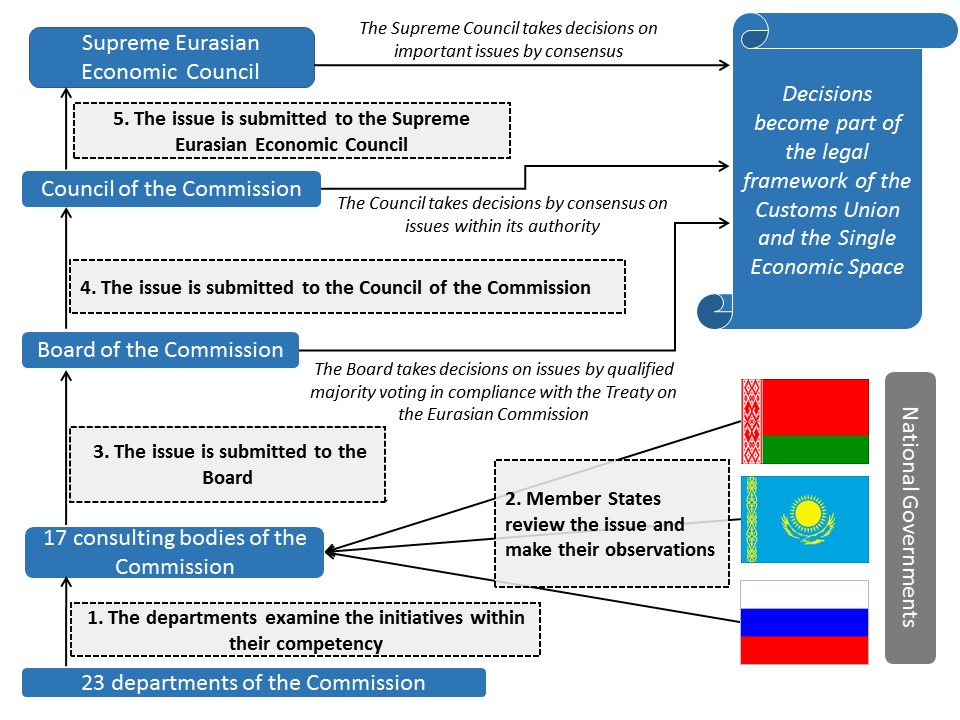
Current decision-making process of the Eurasian Customs Union and the Single Economic Space

The Eurasian Economic Union has sought to base its model on the European Union. All institutions carry out their work in compliance with the Treaty on the Eurasian Economic Commission (EEC) and the international agreements that provide the legal and regulatory framework of the Customs Union and the Single Economic Space.

=== Supreme Eurasian Economic Council ===
The Supreme Council, which is composed by the heads of state of the member states, makes important decisions for the union. It approves the budget and the distribution of the contribution of the Member States. The Supreme Council also determines the strategy, direction and prospects of integration and takes decisions aimed at achieving the goals of the union.

=== Eurasian Economic Commission ===
The Eurasian Commission was established as the supranational governing body of the Eurasian Economic Space on 1 January 2012. The commission was modelled on the European Commission. Its headquarters are in Moscow. The commission monitors subordinate branches and advisory bodies. Its departments were greatly expanded on 1 January 2015, and the number of international employees increased from 150 to 1,200.

The Eurasian Commission can take decisions on not only the customs policy of the union, but also on the macro-economy, the competition regulations, the energy policy and the fiscal policy of the Eurasian Economic Union. It has strict anti-corruption laws.

The Eurasian Economic Commission consists of two bodies: the Council and the Collegium.

==== Council ====
The council is composed of the Vice Prime Ministers of the member states. The council of the Commission oversees the integration processes in the Union, and is responsible for the overall management of the Eurasian Commission. It monitors the commission by approving the draft budget of the union, the maximum number of personnel, and the qualification requirements for the commission's employees. The council convenes once every quarter.

It also considers issues of customs cooperation, trade and development of Eurasian integration. The council regularly holds discussions on the important aspects of the EAEU and meets with business representatives of the member states.

==== Board ====
The Board is composed of ten commissioners, one of which is the chairman of the board. Each member state provides two commissioners to the Board of the Eurasian Commission who carry out the operational management and oversee the everyday work of the Eurasian Commission. All ten commissioners are appointed by the Supreme Eurasian Council for a four-year renewable term. The commissioners also receive the status of federal ministers in their respective countries.

The Board of the commission is the executive body of the commission. It convenes once every week at least, and is responsible for the day-to-day running of the Eurasian Economic Union. It has a wide range of activities, including monitoring the implementation of treaties, submitting annual progress reports and making recommendations. The Board also assists member states in the settlement of disputes, and carries out the draft of the union's budget. Part of its activities include being the intermediary between the departments of the commission and the heads of state of the member states.

A number of departments are headed by the commissioners. The lower rank staff is composed of 84% Russian officials, 10% Kazakhs and 6% Belarusians, proportional to the populations of the member states. The departments enable the Board of the Eurasian Commission to make decisions not only with regard to customs policies, but in such areas as macroeconomics, regulation of economic competition, energy policy and financial policy. The Commission departments are also involved in government procurement and labour migration control.

=== Parliament ===
As of 2015, the EAEU has no directly or indirectly elected body. In 2012, the creation of a Eurasian parliament was under consideration. However, it was considered too premature, and member states have instead begun harmonising national laws and legal codes.

Russian president Vladimir Putin has upheld the idea of creating a parliament for the union.

=== Court of the Eurasian Economic Union ===
The Court of the Eurasian Economic Union replaced the Court of the Eurasian Economic Community (EurAsEC Court) in 2015. It is in charge of dispute resolution and the interpretation of the legal order within the Eurasian Economic Union. Its headquarters is in Minsk. The court is composed of two judges from each member state, appointed by the heads of government of the member states. Their term of office is nine years.

=== Budget ===
The approved budget of the Eurasian Economic Union for 2015 exceeds 6.6 billion Russian roubles. The budget is formed from contributions by the union's member states. In 2015, 6 billion roubles will be allocated for the activity of the Eurasian Economic Commission, 463 million roubles will be set aside for financing the operation and further development of the EAEU integrated information system designed to promote and inform consumers of the EAEU's activities, and over 290 millions roubles will finance the activities of the Court of the EAEU. (Note: These numbers only reflect the official budget (direct money) allocated for the functioning of the union. Vast amounts of additional funds come from national governments and other institutions to ease, promote or facilitate Eurasian integration.) Extra expenses of infrastructure and accommodation of commission workers are financed by Russia. In addition, Russia allocated US$1 billion to accelerate Kyrgyzstan's entry into the union. Another US$177 million was provided by Kazakhstan.

=== Languages ===
According to Article 110 of the Treaty on the Eurasian Economic Union (2014) the Russian language is the working language of the 'Bodies of the Union'.

== Economy ==
Top 4 largest economies (China, the US, India, Russia) in the world by PPP-adjusted GDP in 2023
according to the World Bank, the members of the Eurasian Economic Union as well as
Tajikistan and Uzbekistan that are forming a common market within the CIS (EAEU+2)

Selection of GDP PPP data (top 10 countries and blocs) in no particular order

=== Internal market overview ===
The Treaty on Increased Integration in the Economic and Humanitarian Fields signed in 1996 laid the first foundation for economic convergence. The treaty ensured the creation of a permanent executive organ to oversee integration of states that later would be part of the EAEU. It served as the blueprint for the future common market for goods, services, capital and labour. The Single Economic Space established a single market across the territory of Belarus, Russia and Kazakhstan. In 2015 with the entry into force of the EAEU Agreement, the single market was expanded to include Armenia and Kyrgyzstan. The countries represent a market of some 180 million people and a combined GDP PPP of around $5 trillion.

Eurasian Economic Union has the tenth-largest economy in the world by nominal GDP and the fifth-largest by purchasing power parity. Since the turn of the century, member states have experienced economic growth with GDP averaging 6% to 8% growth between 2000 and 2007, rising again in 2010 after the 2008 financial crisis.

Since the establishment of the Eurasian Customs Union in 2010, trade between member states rose sharply. In 2011 mutual trade was $63 billion, 33.9% more than in 2010. In 2012, mutual trade was $68 billion and combined exports reached $594 billion, while imports were $341 billion. The first integration stage primarily enhanced trade among member states, bolstered economies and created a legal and institutional foundation for the member states. The second stage includes the free movements of goods, people, services and capital.

The Eurasian Economic Union is designed to reach a number of macroeconomic objectives such as reducing commodity prices by reducing the cost of transportation of raw materials, increasing return on new technologies and products due to the increased market volume, and promoting "healthy" competition in the common market. It is also designed to lower food prices, increase employment in industries and increase production capacity. EAEU members like Belarus and Kazakhstan (by its Nurly Zhol economic policy) seek to leverage the EAEU as a bridge between the European Union and the New Silk Road economic belt.

The Eurasian Union is considered as a major player in the world's energy sector, raw materials, arms industry and agricultural production. In 2013 Russia was the 3rd most successful country in the world in attracting capital from abroad.

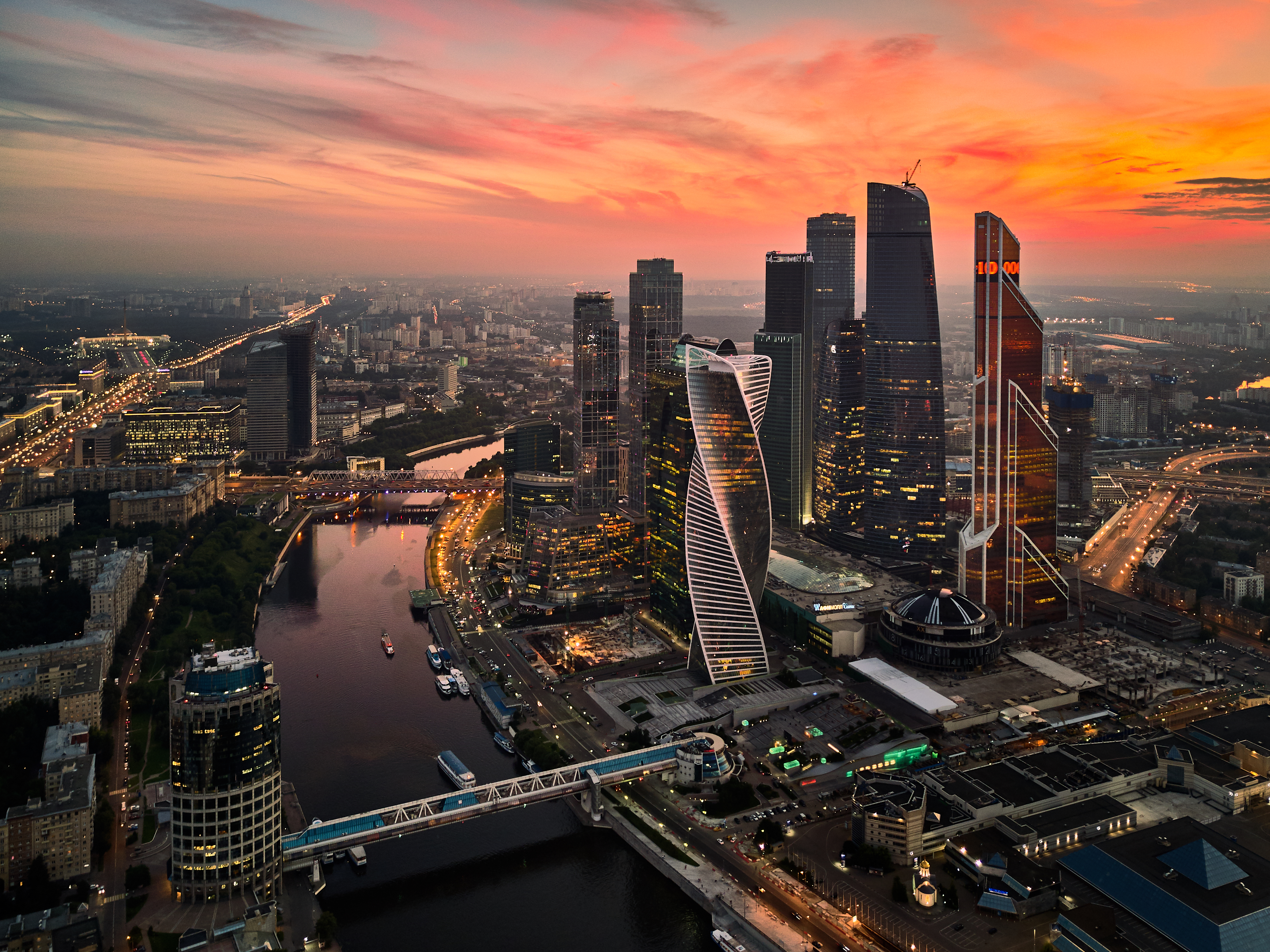
The Moscow International Business Center is a commercial district in Moscow that is currently under construction. The complex includes some of Europe's tallest skyscrapers.

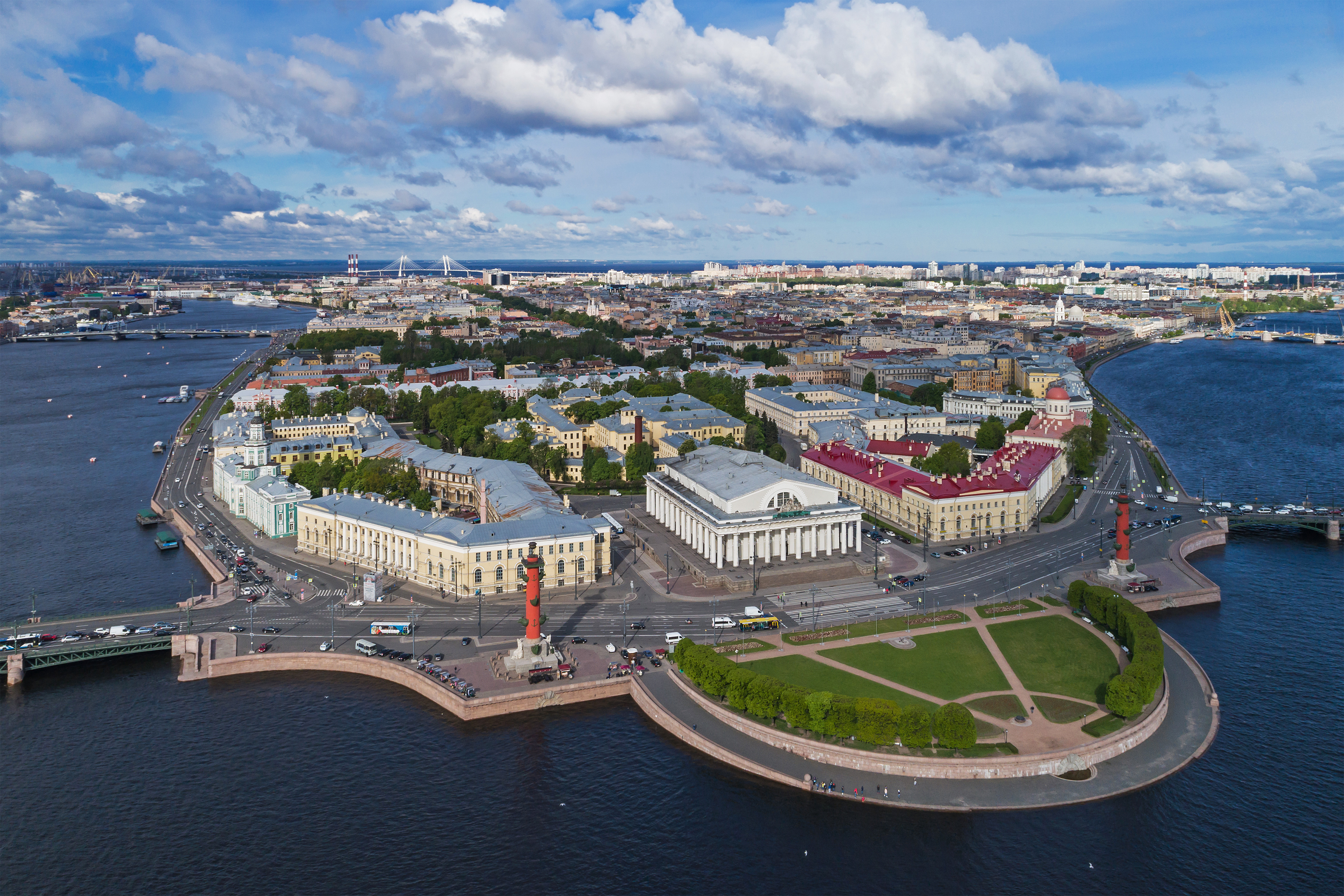
Saint Petersburg, the second-largest city and cultural capital of Russia

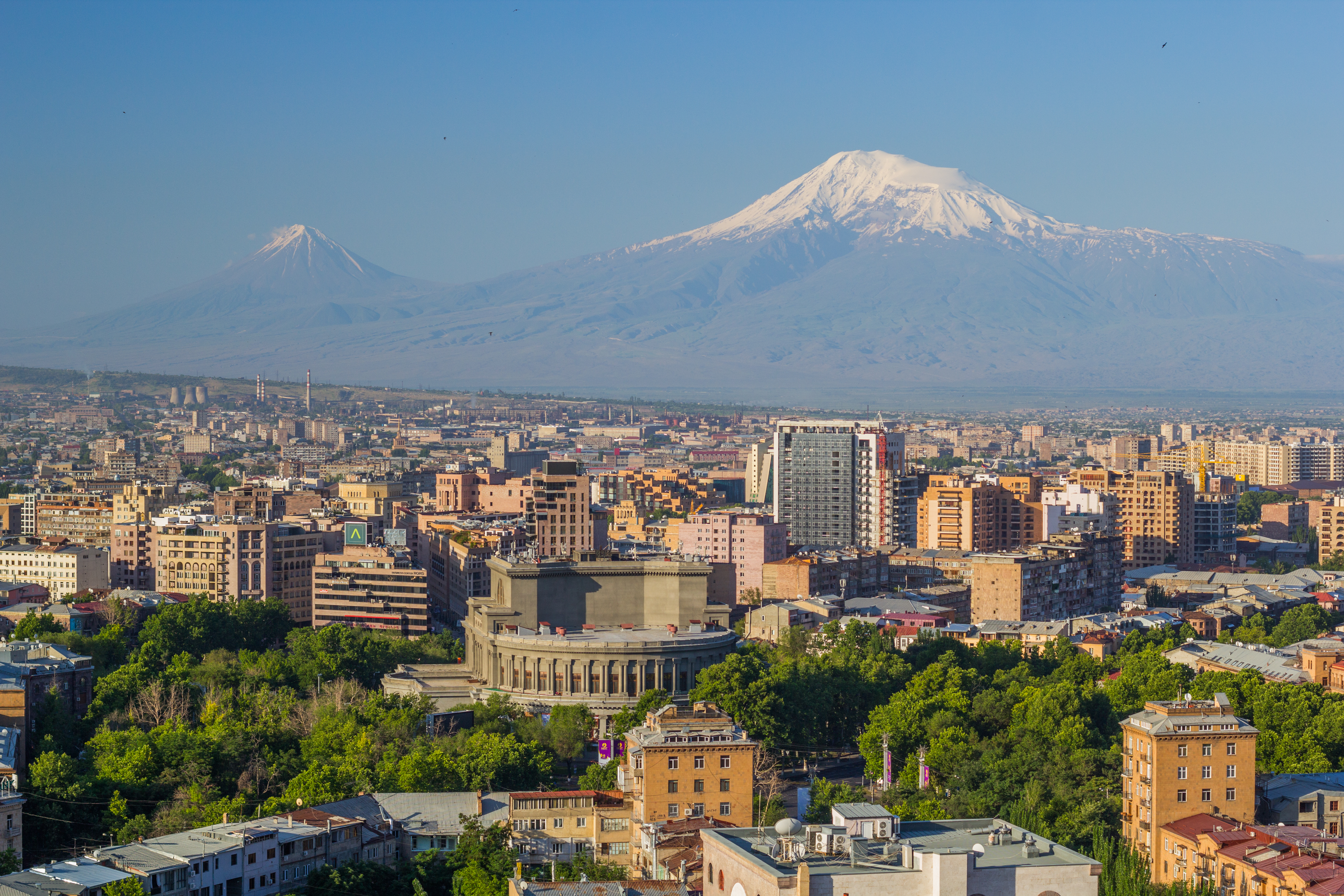
Yerevan, the capital and financial hub of Armenia

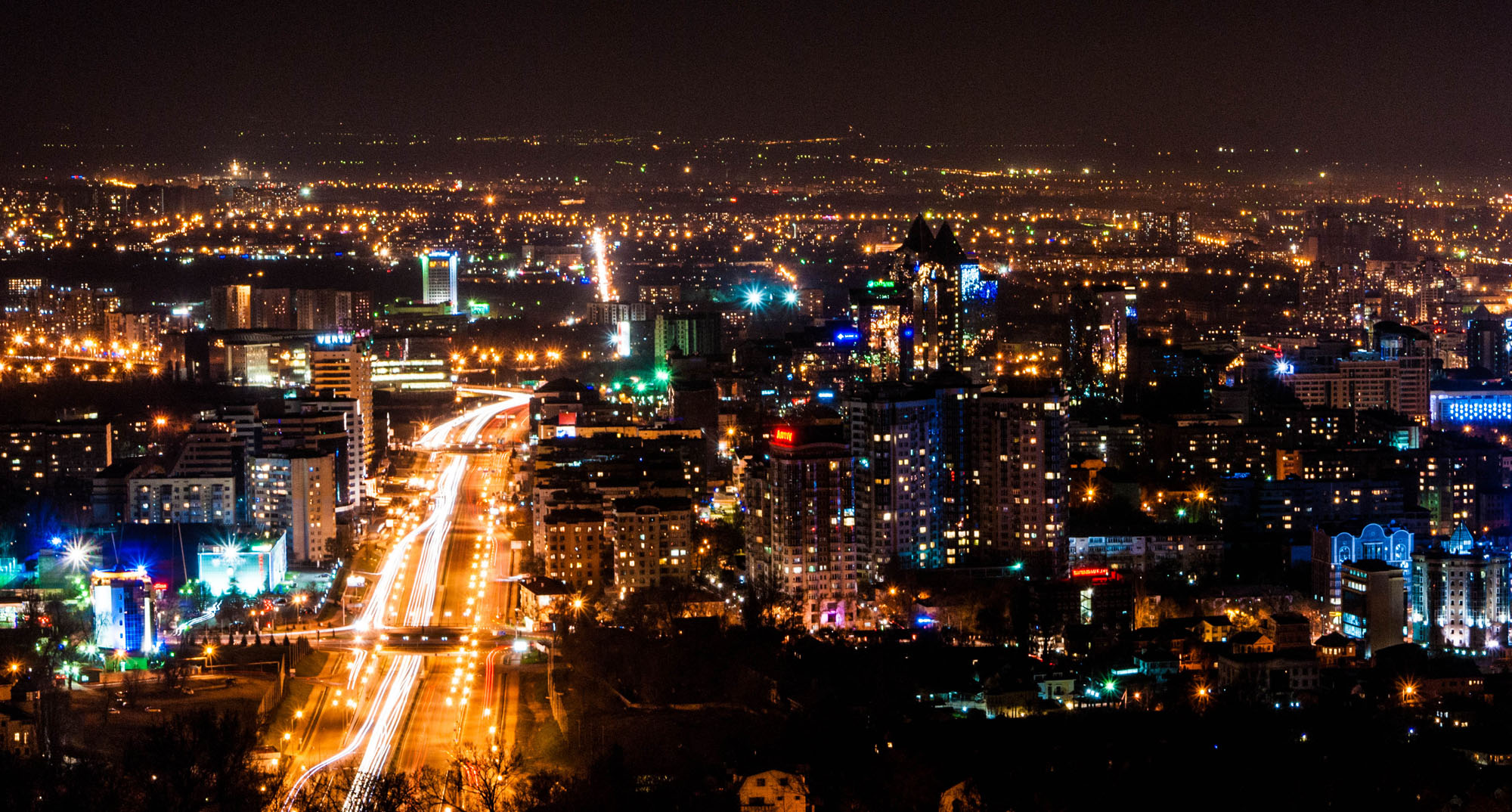
Almaty, the major commercial and cultural centre of Kazakhstan

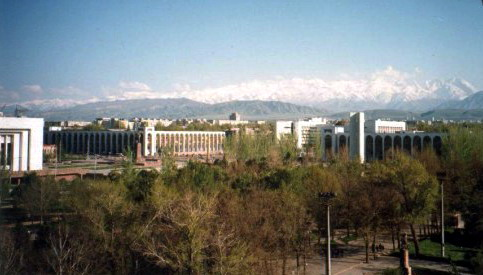
Bishkek, the capital and financial hub of Kyrgyzstan

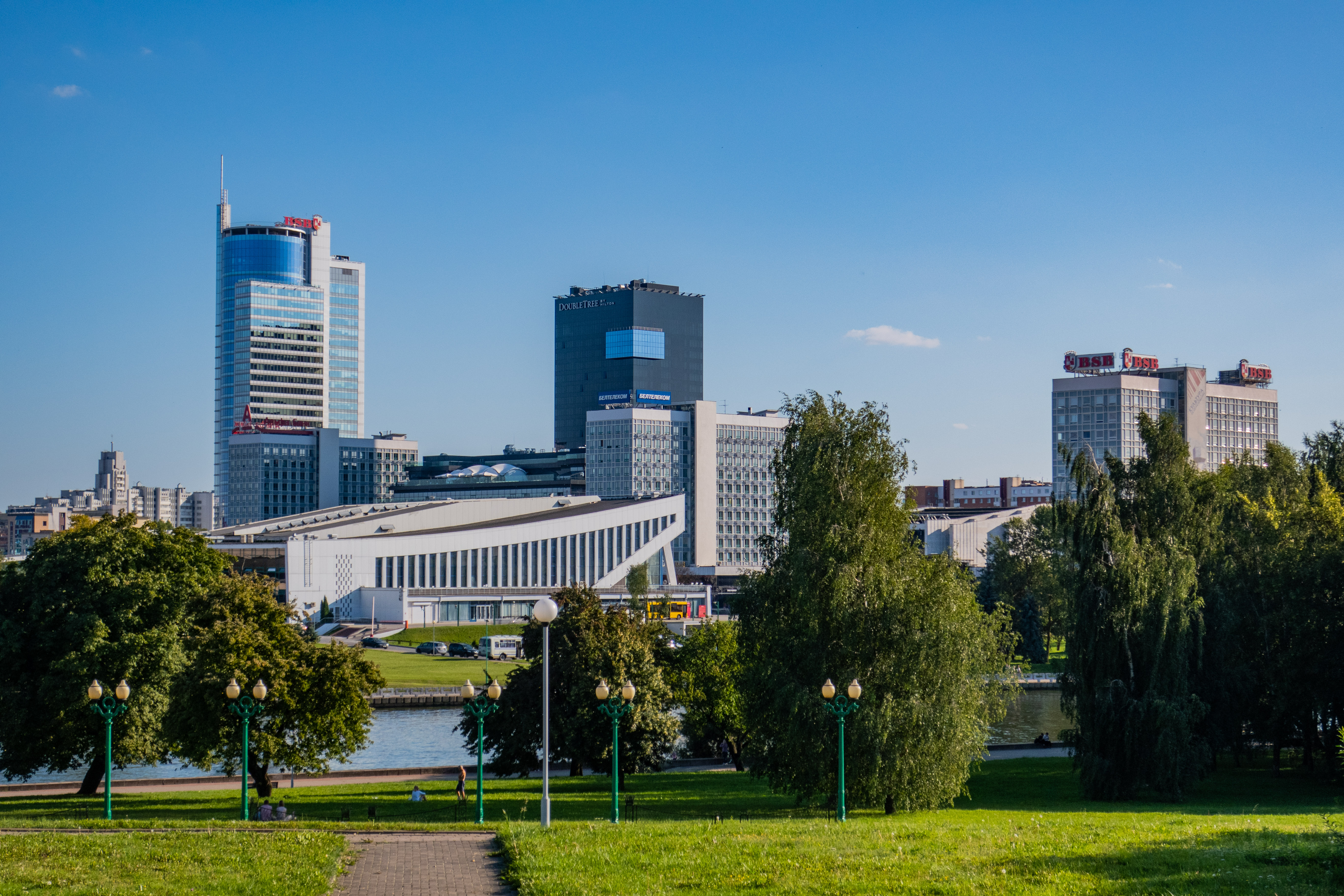
Minsk, the capital of Belarus

=== Customs Union and Four Economic Freedoms ===
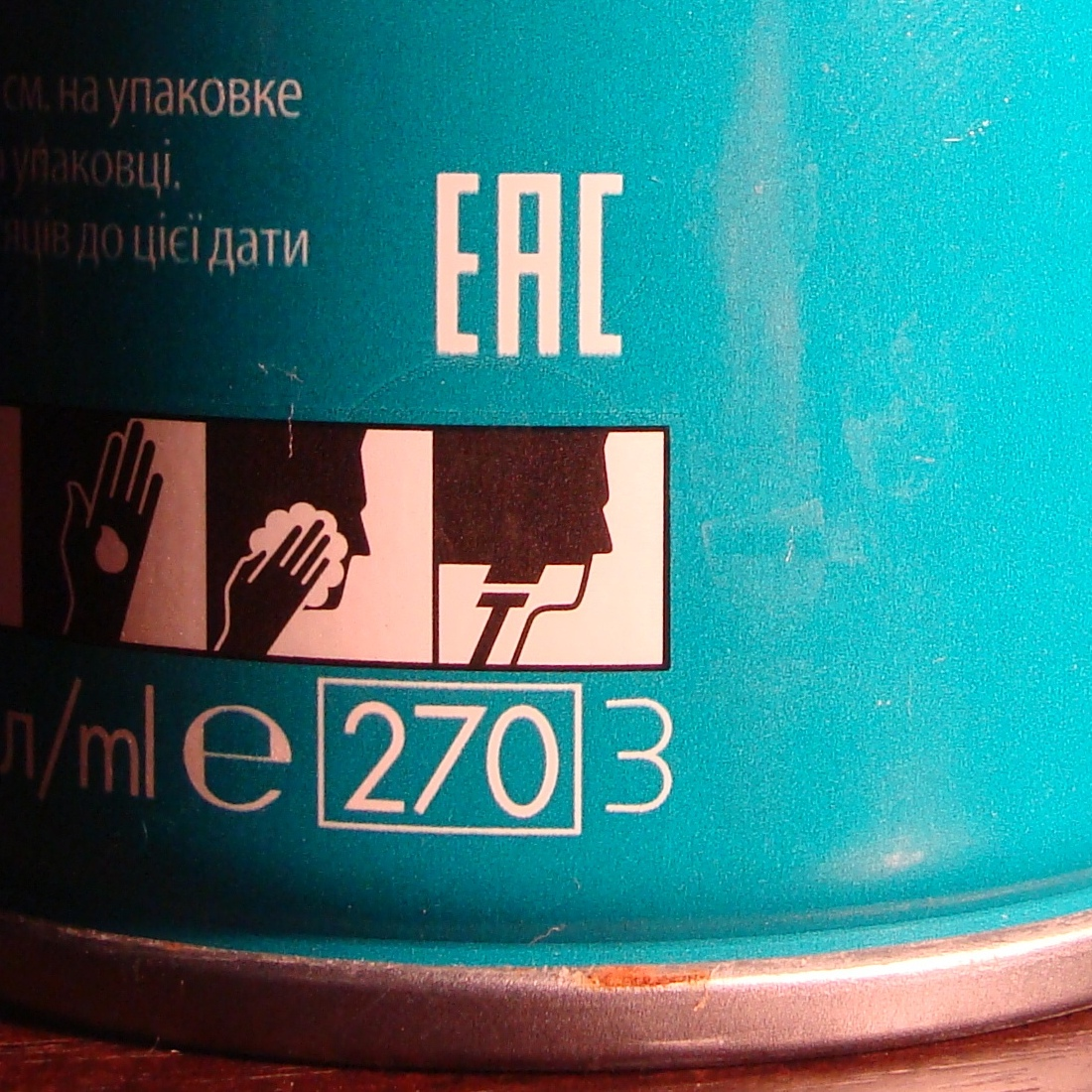
The Eurasian Conformity mark EAC

The core objective of the Single Economic Space is the development of a single market and achieving the "four freedoms", namely the free movements of goods, capital, services and people within the single market. The four freedoms came into effect on 1 January 2015 (the day the Eurasian Economic Union was officially established). The free movement of people means that citizens can move freely among member states to live, work, study or retire. Citizens of the member states of the union may travel to other member states on an internal passport. Although Russia also admits access to citizens of other CIS states without a passport, it is expected that after 2015 only citizens of the Customs Union will have this privilege. Member states have a common external tariff on all goods entering the market and unified methods of valuing imported goods since the creation of the Eurasian Customs Union on 1 January 2010. Objectives include joint coordination in the area of energy, industry, agriculture and transport.

Roughly 75% of Belarusian goods are exported, about half of which go to other member states. Trade within the union primarily consists of Belarusian machinery and agricultural products which are exported to Russia. Low gas prices from Russian energy producers are guaranteed to member states or countries wishing to join the union.

=== Coordinated, harmonised and single policy ===
Besides free movement of goods, services, capital and labour without a work permit ("four economic freedoms" as in the European Union), the EAEU pursues coordinated, harmonised and single policy in the sectors determined by the Treaty and international agreements within the Union.

=== Competition ===
The Eurasian Economic Commission operates a competition policy to ensure equal competitive conditions in the commodity markets of the Single Economic Space. It also aims at harmonisation and improvement of legislation of each of the three countries in regard to competition policy. The commission serves as the competition regulator for the single market and is also responsible for antitrust issues. Special regulations limit state intervention in the economy.

=== Monetary union ===
The increased use of the national currencies of Russia, Belarus and Kazakhstan and the creation of a single payment system can raise about a transition to a single currency for the union.

— Rossiyskaya Gazeta, Director of Financial Policy Department of the Eurasian Economic Commission, 3 August 2014

Kazakhstani president Nursultan Nazarbayev had first proposed, in 2009, the creation of a common noncash currency called "yevraz" for the Eurasian Economic Community. It would have reportedly helped insulate the countries from the global economic crisis. In 2012, the idea of the new joint currency found support from Vladimir Putin and Dmitry Medvedev and by 2014 proposals were drafted in Eurasian Commission documents for the establishment of a Eurasian Central Bank and a common currency to be called the altyn which is to be introduced by 2025.

When discussing the Eurasian Economic Union, Vladimir Putin said the Eurasian Economic Union would include closer coordination of economic and monetary policy, including the use of a common currency in the future. Although the creation of a monetary union was not envisaged in the Eurasian Economic Union Treaty, Russian prime minister Dmitry Medvedev called for the introduction of a common currency for the Eurasian Economic Union. Leonid Slutsky, head of the State Duma's CIS committee, backed Medvedev's proposal to start discussions on the creation of a monetary union. Slutsky said it could be introduced shortly after 2015, when the union's structure becomes clear. Belarusian president, Alexander Lukashenko, circulated the idea of creating a "new euro" for the Eurasian economic bloc. In April 2014, discussions to introduce a single currency resumed.

Russia's First Deputy Prime Minister, Igor Shuvalov, stated on 24 July 2014 that the Eurasian Economic Union will have a common currency unit in a span of five to ten years.

=== Energy ===
The Eurasian Economic Union is seen as an energy superpower, producing about 20.7% of the world's natural gas, and 14.6% of the world's oil and gas condensate in 2012, making it the world's top producer in both domains. These figures are mainly due to Russian Membership of EAEU, with Kazakhstan contributing 1.9% and 0.6% in gas and oil production respectively. Considerably small oil and gas reserved were discovered in Belarus while there are no such resources in Armenia. It also produces 9% of the world's electrical energy and 5.9% of the world's coal, making it the third and fourth producer in the world, respectively. In Kazakhstan, energy is the leading economic sector. The country holds about 4 billion tons of proven recoverable oil reserves and 2,000 cubic kilometres (480 mi^{3}) of gas. Kazakhstan is the world's 17th largest oil exporter and the world's 23rd largest natural gas exporter.

Russia has the world's largest natural gas reserves, the 8th largest oil reserves, and the second largest coal reserves. Russia is also the world's leading natural gas exporter and the second largest natural gas producer, while also the largest oil exporter and the largest oil producer. While trade in oil and gas between resource-rich Russia and Kazakhstan is relatively low, the Belarus economy is heavily dependent on the access to the Russian hydrocarbons and – unlike the case with Kyrgyzstan and Armenia, Russia is Belarus's main trade partner accounting for 47% of all the trade. Belarus imports Russian crude oil (of which 45–50% were used for production of oil products to export) and natural gas (which were not directly re-exported) for the prices below the market ones, paying $173 for 1000 cubic metres of gas (for comparison – $250 for Armenia, $430 for Ukraine).

By 2019, Russia, Kazakhstan, Belarus and Armenia intend to create a common electricity market as well as a single hydrocarbons market by 2025. "With the creation of a single hydrocarbons market, we will have a deeper coordination that will allow us to be more competitive both in terms of pricing and in terms of getting high value added products in this very interesting and important market", stated Eurasian Commissioner Daniyal Akhmetov.

=== Infrastructure ===
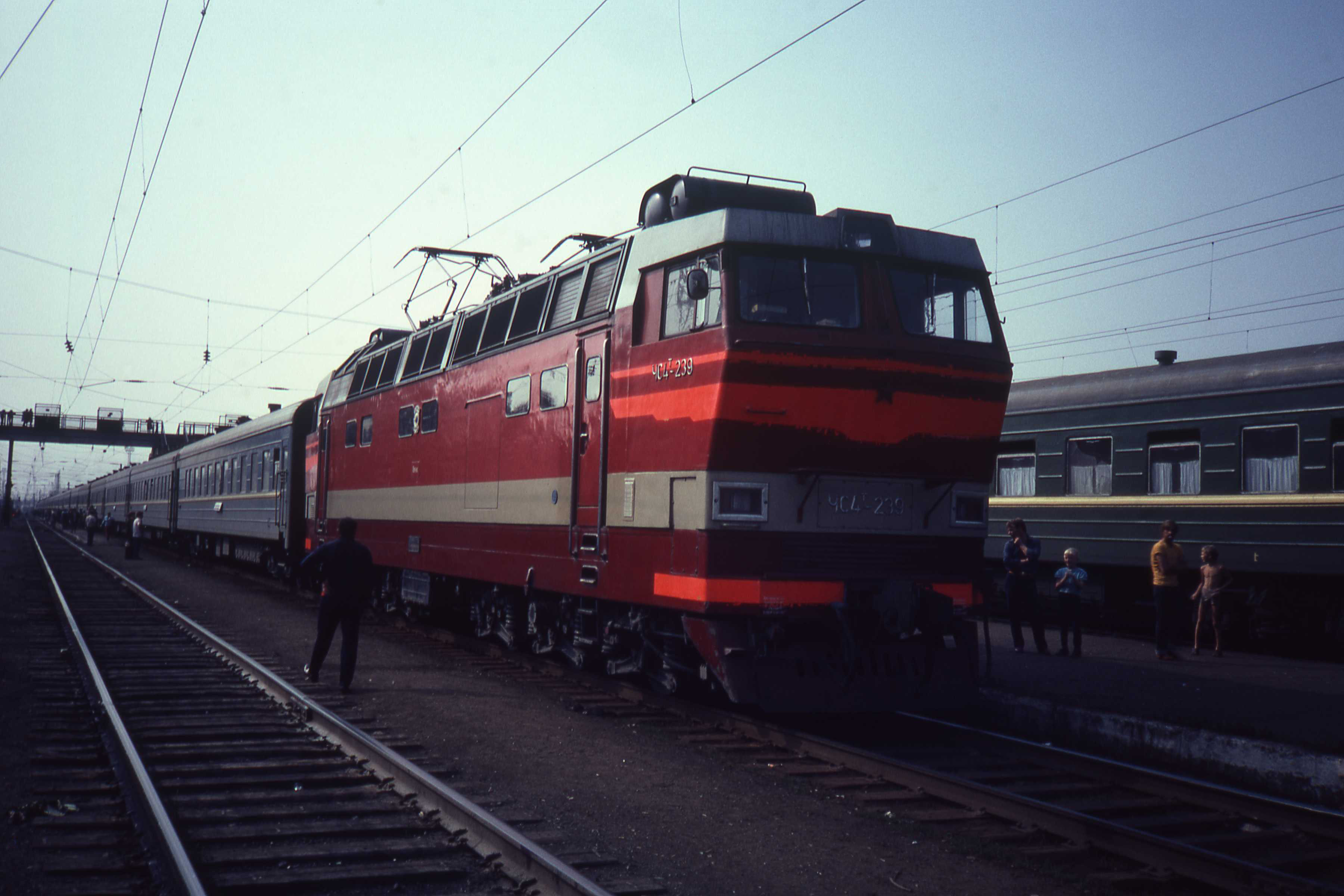
The Trans-Siberian Railway is a vital link between the Russian Far East and the rest of Eurasia.

The major economic centres are Moscow, Minsk and Astana. The distance between Moscow and Minsk is 717 kilometres, and the distance between Moscow and Astana is 2700 kilometres, making infrastructure a key challenge for the integration of member states. Major infrastructure projects began during the 2000s in order to modernise and connect the regional bloc to other markets, facilitating both integration and trade in the region. In 2007 Moscow announced it will invest US$1 trillion by 2020 to modernise the country's infrastructure.

Kazakhstan ranks favourably in terms of kilometres of road per inhabitant as other developed countries in the world have much less roadway per inhabitant.

Railways have been the primary way of linking countries in the Eurasian Economic Union since the 19th century. It has always been the main way of transport in the Russian Empire and the Soviet Union up until today. The union ranks 2nd in the world in terms of railway trackage (about 7.8% of the world's share). However it is still looking to improve cross-border trade within the union.

The Eurasian Development Bank has pledged to help in the construction of facilities to produce new generation freight cars and freight containers in Tikhvin, Russia and in Osipovichi, Belarus to respond to the increasing demand for rail transport. Projects have also been launched in Kazakhstan, as the landlocked country is highly dependent on railways for trade.

The most renowned railway in the union is the Trans-Siberian Railway which links the Russian Far East to Moscow. The Southern route also travels via Kazakhstan.

The EAEU members cooperate with China's Digital Silk Road and have incorporated Chinese technologies into their digital infrastructure.

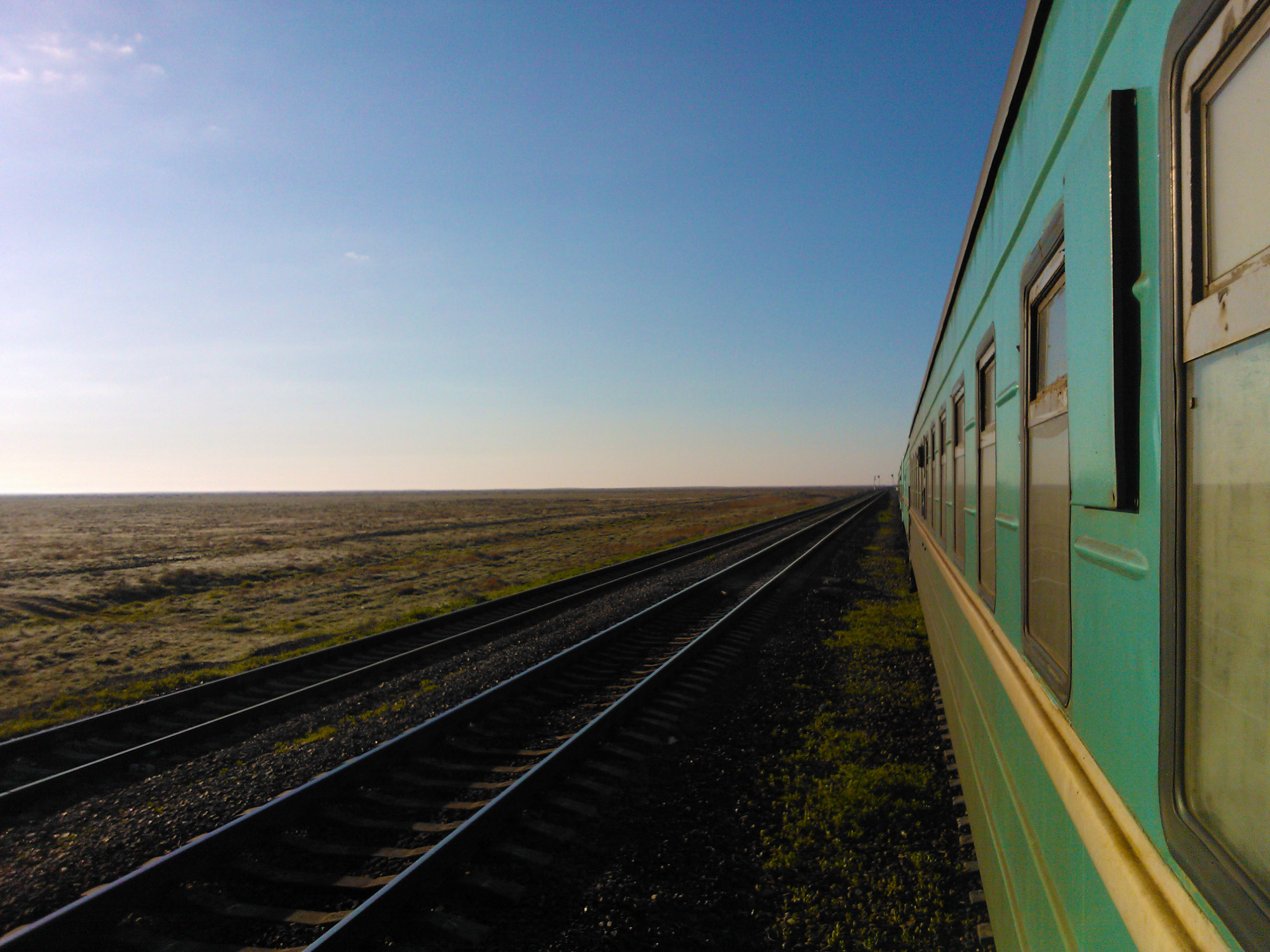
The Turkestan–Siberia Railway connects the Central Asian republics to Siberia.

==== Single Eurasian Sky ====
The Single Eurasian Sky programme, administered by the Eurasian Economic Commission, outlines the creation of a single market for air services and a single air traffic zone. The single air traffic zone would make it easier for airlines to draw up new flight paths, thereby increasing the number of flights flying through the region. Eurasian Commissioner, Daniyal Akhmetov, said that it would be created on a step-by-step basis. In June 2014, Belarusian Airline Belavia stated that it was ready to move towards the development of the Single Eurasian Sky. The terms and conditions of operation in the common aviation market have not yet been agreed on. However, the project is likely to be modelled on the European Union's Single European Sky. The project will reportedly help turn the airspace of the Eurasian Union into a popular transit hub between Europe and Southeast Asia. "We should understand that currently, the aviation companies of Kazakhstan and Belarus are not able to compete with Russia's aviation companies. Therefore, the programme will envisage a phasing, creating a competitive environment and so on", Eurasian Commissioner Akhmetov said.

=== Agriculture ===
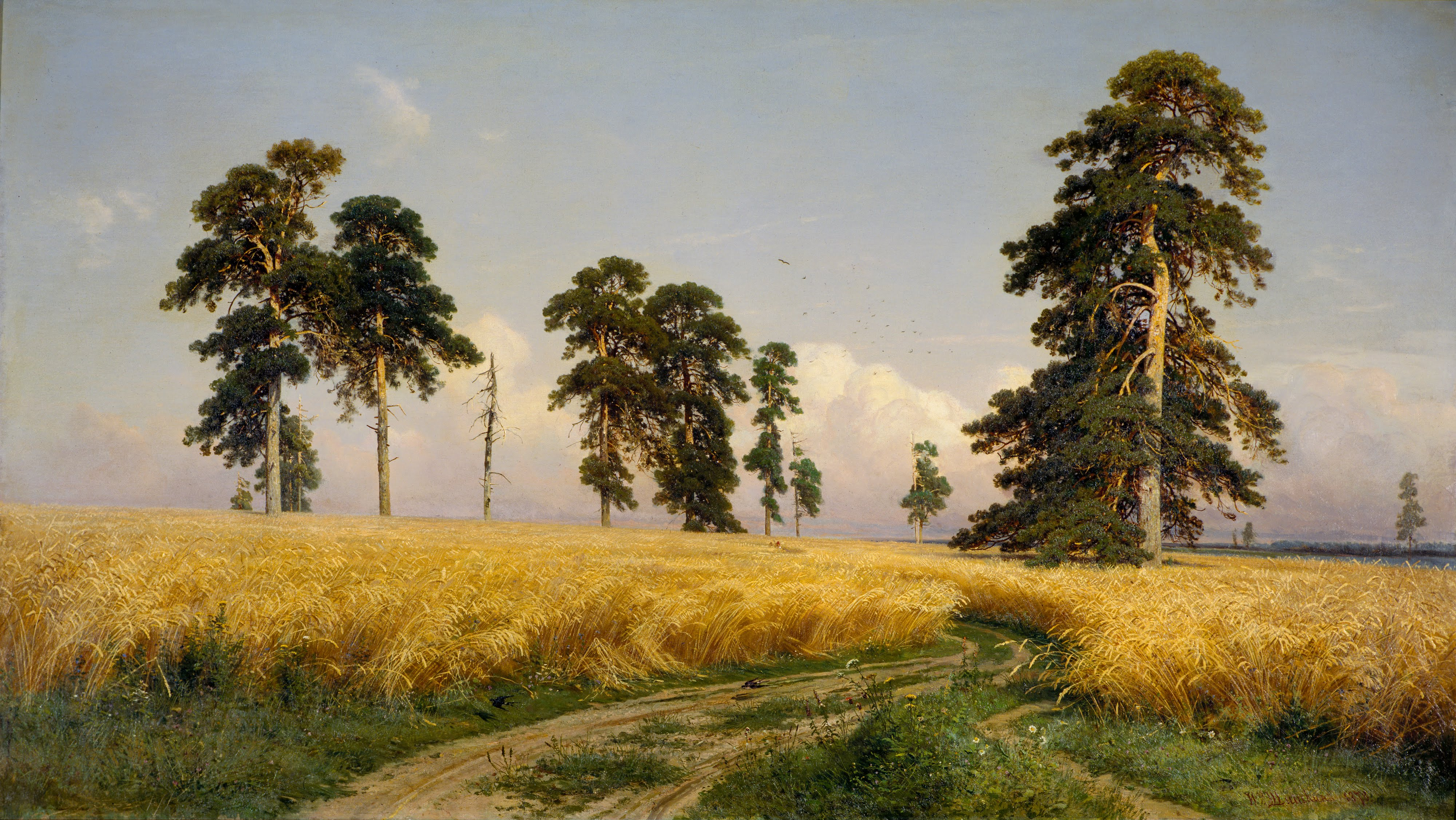
A Rye Field by Ivan Shishkin

The Eurasian Economic Union is the top producer of sugar beet and sunflower, producing 18.6% of the world's sugar beet and 22.7% of the world's sunflowers in 2012, as well as a top producer of rye, barley, buckwheat, oats and sunflower seed. It is also a large producer of potatoes, wheat and grain (and grain legumes).

Part of the competences of the Eurasian Economic Commission are agriculture subsidies. It is responsible for the coordination of agricultural policy-making between member states and ensuring collective food security. The Eurasian Development Bank finances projects to further integration and develop agriculture. It has disbursed approximately US$470 million for projects between 2008 and 2013.

=== Projected economic impact ===
Past and projected GDP (nominal) per capita in EAEU countries

Member states remain optimistic of the union and key partners in the region, namely China, Iran, Turkey remain interested in it. A common belief is that the Eurasian Economic Union has significant potential over the next two decades, with experts predicting a 25 percent growth in the member states' GDP by 2030, which equates to over US$600 billion. The agreement will give member state citizens access to employment and education across the union. It will also entail collaborative policies in many sectors, including agriculture, energy, technology and transportation. These collaborative policies are particularly interesting for countries in Asia seeking access to energy, trade routes in Central Asia and Siberia, and agricultural goods.

Former president Dmitry Medvedev of Russia stated that both the positive and negative experiences of the European Union will be taken into account and argued that the Eurasian Union will avoid the problems of economic gaps and disparity between countries, such as those found in the eurozone, since the member countries have a comparable level of economic development, as well as common history and values.

The European Union and the United States as well as other western countries remain critical of the Eurasian Economic Union, with analysts stating that without modernisation and real economic reforms, the union will have little impact. The popular magazine The Economist stated that the advantages of joining the union remain unclear and further remarked "The agreement was vague, with technical details left unresolved, making it a political show rather than an economic one". Outlets have also stated that without Ukraine, the Eurasian Economic Union has lost a key member state necessary to the success of the union. Bloomberg's business magazine, Businessweek has affirmed that joining Putin's Eurasian Union looks like a bad deal, including for Russia. The union "won't really register on the radar of the global economy," said an analyst at the EU's Institute for Security Studies in Paris. Moreover, one research states that so far EAEU was not able to contribute to economic growth in Armenia – quite the contrary, it significantly slowed the economic performance of the country.

=== Pivot to Asia ===
The union is actively seeking to increase trade with East Asia. It commenced talks for official trade cooperation with ASEAN. Officials of both unions discussed opportunities for developing cooperation between them. The South Korean president launched a "Eurasian Initiative", which seeks to connect transportation, electrical, gas and oil links from Western Europe to East Asia. The initiative echoes China's long-standing "New Silk Road" project. The members of the union agreed to step up talks with Vietnam on creating a free trade zone, to strengthen cooperation with China, including in information exchange on goods and services, and to set up expert groups to develop preferential trade regimes with Israel and India.

==== Russia ====
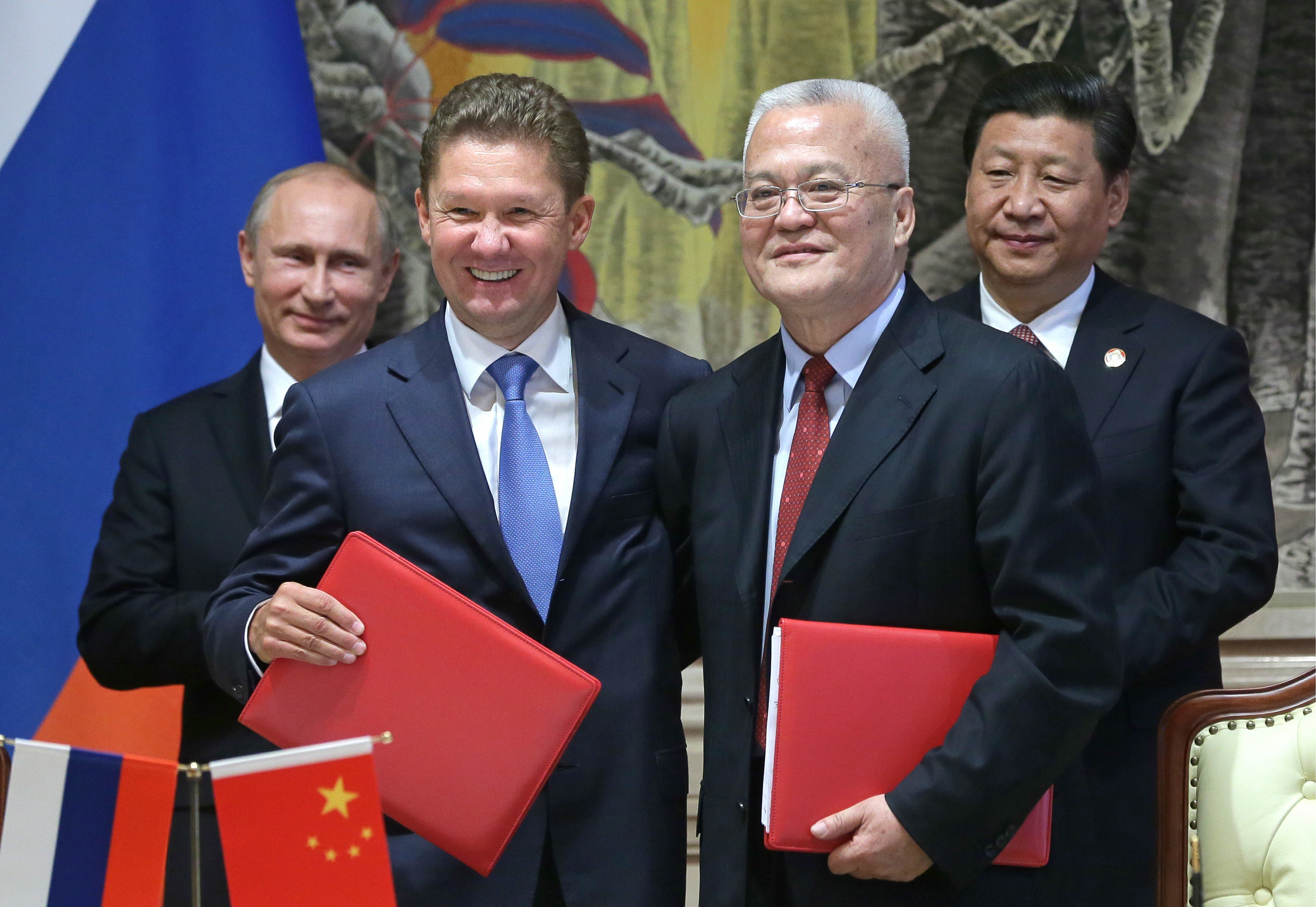
On 21 May 2014, Russia and China signed a $400 billion gas deal. Starting 2019, Russia plans to provide natural gas to China for the next 30 years.

The European Council on Foreign Relations and analysts suggest the Eurasian Union includes strategic interests as well as economic interests for its member states, especially Russia. In order to link both Europe and East Asia, Russia seeks to develop its eastern regions to increase its access to Asian markets. Russia's Far East has gained even more importance due to its proximity to alternative markets since the European Union and United States imposed sanctions on Russia following the start of the Russo-Ukrainian war.

China's rise as a major trading partner has been cited as a potential reason for Russia's loss of control over Central Asian economies. The union is seen as a way to counterbalance China's growing trade in Central Asia and the European Union's Eastern Partnership.

As the trade bloc seeks to profit from the growing economies of East Asia, Russia has made steps to develop its eastern territories, Siberia and the Russian Far East. However, the development of the Russian Far East may face difficulties due to Russia's traditional orientation towards Europe and the region's backward infrastructure and underdeveloped economy. In 2012 Russian president Vladimir Putin called for Russia to "catch the Chinese wind in the sails of the Russian economy". During the same year, a Ministry for the Development of the Russian Far East was established and the country hosted a summit of the Asia-Pacific Economic Cooperation forum (APEC) in its eastern city of Vladivostok. The country also began striking deals and undertook massive efforts to improve infrastructure in its eastern territories. Russia's pivot to Asia included the important task of creating a Eurasian trade bloc. The countries seek to increase their competitiveness by sustaining domestic development and defending their interests in the region. An estimated 76% of Russia's exports depend on resources extracted (or manufactured) in Siberia. In order to transport goods from East Asia to Europe, they must be transported through Siberia by rail. Hence, the region plays an important role in trade. However, it remains less developed than Russia's western regions and modernisation plans are ongoing.

In 2013 the Russian government announced it would spend 450 billion roubles (US$14 billion) for the modernisation of the Trans-Siberian and Baikal-Amur railways. Russian President Vladimir Putin called the Trans-Siberian railway the country's "strategically vital transport artery". In July 2013 he stated "Rail freight traffic to our Far East ports has increased by 55 percent over the last 5 years and now comes to around 110 million tons a year". Projects to upgrade stations at the border with Mongolia, China and North Korea were also undertaken the same year.

In 2016, Putin calls on Eurasian Economic Union, China, India, Pakistan, Iran and the CIS to join "Greater Eurasian Partnership".

Some experts also see the union as a way to curtail the loss of Russian influence in Central Asia. Russian politicians have voiced their concerns over Russia's long southern borders and the challenges it may pose. By creating a regional trade bloc to keep its neighbours in Central Asia stable, Russia hopes to find securing its own borders easier.

==== Kazakhstan ====
Neighbouring Kazakhstan has replicated Russia's attempt to access East Asian markets. In September 2013, the presidents of China and Kazakhstan signed commercial deals and launched China's "New Silk Road". On 20 May 2014, both presidents announced they would link Kazakhstan's railways to the Pacific Ocean by opening a new terminal in the Chinese port city of Lianyungang. China also signed agreements to make further investments in Kazakhstan's energy sector. Both countries announced they would put aside US$1 billion to modernise an oil refinery in Shymkent and a further US$150 million to open a new oil and gas plant near Almaty. The president of Kazakhstan also held talks with the heads of Chinese corporations and agreed to cooperate in the areas of aircraft production, telecommunication and mining. (Note: Ernesto, Gallo (4 June 2014). "Kazakhstan's "Pivot to China"?" (PDF). Policy Brief (154).)

== Third-country economic relationships ==
The Union has signed a first free trade agreement with Vietnam.

Having completed a free trade agreement (FTA) feasibility study for Vietnam in November 2012 the then Customs Union, which later became the EAEU, decided to proceed with negotiations. The negotiations over the FTA began in early 2013 and lasted approximately two years – on 29 May 2015 the agreement was signed by Prime Ministers of all the parties to be later ratified by the parties. Trade between Vietnam and the Customs Union in 2011 was US$2.24 billion.

Russia's economic development minister stated that the Turkish economic minister, Nihat Zeybekci, put forward an initiative for closer cooperation with the Eurasian Economic Union, including the formation of a free trade zone between the union and Turkey.

As announced by Russian Deputy Prime Minister Arkady Dvorkovich on 9 December 2013, Israel is considering starting free trade negotiations with the Eurasian Economic Union. The feasibility study was conducted between the two parties and the decision was made to proceed with free trade negotiations, which are expected to start before the end of 2016. Experts believe the negotiations will take around 2 to 3 years to finish.

Russian president Vladimir Putin stated at a July 2014 meeting of ambassadors and permanent representatives of the Russian Federation that he was ready to discuss a free trade area between the European Union and the Eurasian Economic Union.

In February 2015, Egyptian president Abdel Fattah al-Sisi announced his country would sign a free trade agreement with the Eurasian Union. The preliminary feasibility study has been conducted and the decision to launch negotiation process is expected to be made before the end of 2016.

There have been discussions on free trade negotiations with over 30 countries, some of them resulting in the preliminary feasibility studies. Such feasibility studies have been conducted with India and the Republic of Korea.

In May 2015, the Union gave the initial go-ahead to signing a free trade agreement with Iran. Described as the EAEU's "key partner in the Middle East" by Andrey Slepnev, Minister for trade on the Eurasian Economic Commission board in an expert-level EAEU meeting in Yerevan, Viktor Khristenko furthermore noted that Iran is an important partner for all the EAEU member states. He stated that "Cooperation between the EAEU and Iran is an important area of our work in strengthening the economic stability of the region". In December 2015 a "temporary Agreement" was signed between Iran and the EAEU, which Commissioner Andrey Slepnev characterised as the "first step toward the materialization of free trade between Iran and the Union".

One of the key initiatives in the field of free trade and economic cooperation is the proposal on "linking" the Eurasian economic integration and China's strategic "Silk Road Economic Belt" project. The relevant communique was signed by President of Russia Vladimir Putin and General Secretary of the Chinese Communist Party Xi Jinping on 8 March 2015. While the "linking" mostly is understood as support for infrastructure investments, there are ongoing negotiations between the EAEU and China on a "trade and economic agreement" in order to build "an open economic architecture without a political component, oriented on business and reducing barriers".

As a result of Russia's invasion of Ukraine, the US and EU placed sanctions upon Russia and Belarus. On 10 March 2022, Russia suspended exports of wheat, meslin, rye, barley, and corn to the Eurasian Economic Union to secure the country's food supplies. The ban was reversed on 1 April 2022, although other restrictions on the trade of foods were simultaneously introduced. On 29 March a Kazakh government official stated that Kazakhstan would abide by US and EU sanctions and would not facilitate any circumvention, despite its membership of the EAEU. The official explained that Kazakhstan does not wish to be targeted by secondary sanctions, and instead will be seeking to expand its cooperation with the EU.

As of 2023, negotiations were also well underway with Indonesia and the United Arab Emirates. Negotiations with Iran and Egypt were almost finalised. The EEC was also preparing to revise its current agreement with China. The current, non-preferential agreement entered into force in October 2019 and does not provide any reduction in duties.

On 15 December 2023, the EAEU signed a free trade agreement with Iran that will eliminate customs duties on almost 90% of goods. The agreement serves to replace a similar temporary agreement that has been in force since 2019.

As of 2024, a potential free trade agreement between Mongolia and the EAEU is under discussion, but its future remains subject to domestic political and economic considerations.

In 2024, it was reported that FTA agreements were being discussed at various stages with Pakistan and Israel, among others.

On 22 January 2025, the Council of the Eurasian Economic Commission adopted a Resolution on formation of a joint research group to study the feasibility of concluding a free trade agreement with the Republic of Tunisia.

The Eurasian Economic Union is discussing the possibility of concluding an agreement on the creation of a free trade area with Pakistan, Russian Deputy Prime Minister Alexei Overchuk said on 16 April 2025. "We have set ourselves the task of ensuring free access to markets with a capacity of about 2 billion 200 million people."

The EAEU and Indonesia announced the completion of negotiations on a free trade agreement on 9 July 2025. The agreement was signed in Saint Petersburg on 21 December 2025, at a meeting of the Supreme Eurasian Economic Council.

"We have signed principles on the creation of free trade area between India and the Eurasian Economic Union. I hope that this FTA will be established soon. It is about market access," said Indian Foreign Minister Subrahmanyam Jaishankar on 21 August 2025. On 20 August in Moscow, at the headquarters of the Eurasian Economic Commission, India agreed and signed technical specifications defining the rules and parameters of the upcoming trade negotiations, including a list of issues of fundamental importance to the parties, Alexei Overchuk noted.

=== Third-country EAEU Agreements ===
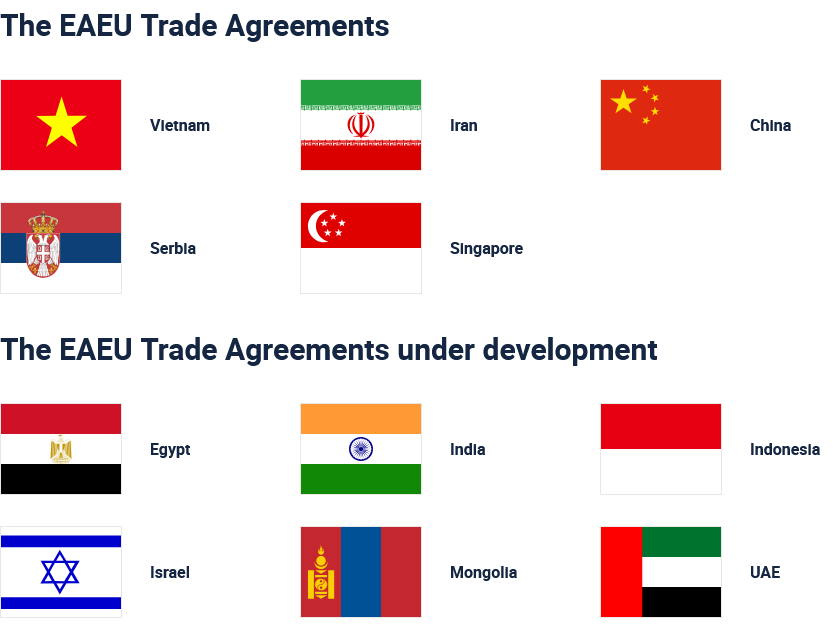
Trade Agreements of the Eurasian Economic Union on the official website in 2025

After 1 January 2015, the members of the EAEU do not have the right to independently conclude a free trade in goods agreements because they delegated their powers to the supranational level according to the Treaty on the Eurasian Economic Union (Article 35).

According to the website of the Eurasian Economic Commission, the EAEU has signed bilateral (one of the parties is the "Eurasian Economic Union and its Member States") agreements with

- Vietnam (signed on 29 May 2015, entered into force on 5 October 2016 and this Free Trade Agreement & Economic Integration Agreement covers trade in goods and trade in services)
- Iran (the Interim Agreement was signed on 17 May 2018, and came into force on 27 October 2019 and this Free Trade Agreement covers trade in goods.) Full FTA signed on 25 December 2023 and came into force on 15 May 2025.
- China (signed on 17 May 2018, entered into force on 25 October 2019 and this Agreement is not a free trade agreement at all since it does not provide any reduction in duties, but it creates a legal framework for trade and economic cooperation between the Union as a whole and China and on issues of customs cooperation, technical barriers to trade, sanitary and phytosanitary measures, trade protection measures, issues of electronic commerce, intellectual property, competition and public procurement, as well as sectoral cooperation and the Parties recognise the importance of economic integration in the Asia-Pacific and Eurasia and the importance of conjunction of the Eurasian Economic Union and the Belt and Road Initiative)
- Serbia (signed on 25 October 2019, and entered into force on 10 July 2021 and this Free Trade Agreement covers trade in goods)
- Singapore (the EAEU-Singapore Framework Agreement and the EAEU-Singapore Free Trade Agreement were signed on 1 October 2019)
- Mongolia (Interim free trade in goods agreement signed on 27 June 2025)
- United Arab Emirates (Free trade in goods agreement signed on 27 June 2025)
- Indonesia (Free trade in goods agreement signed on 21 December 2025)

Officially, agreements with Egypt, India,, Israel are under development.

=== Pre-2015 free trade in goods agreements ===
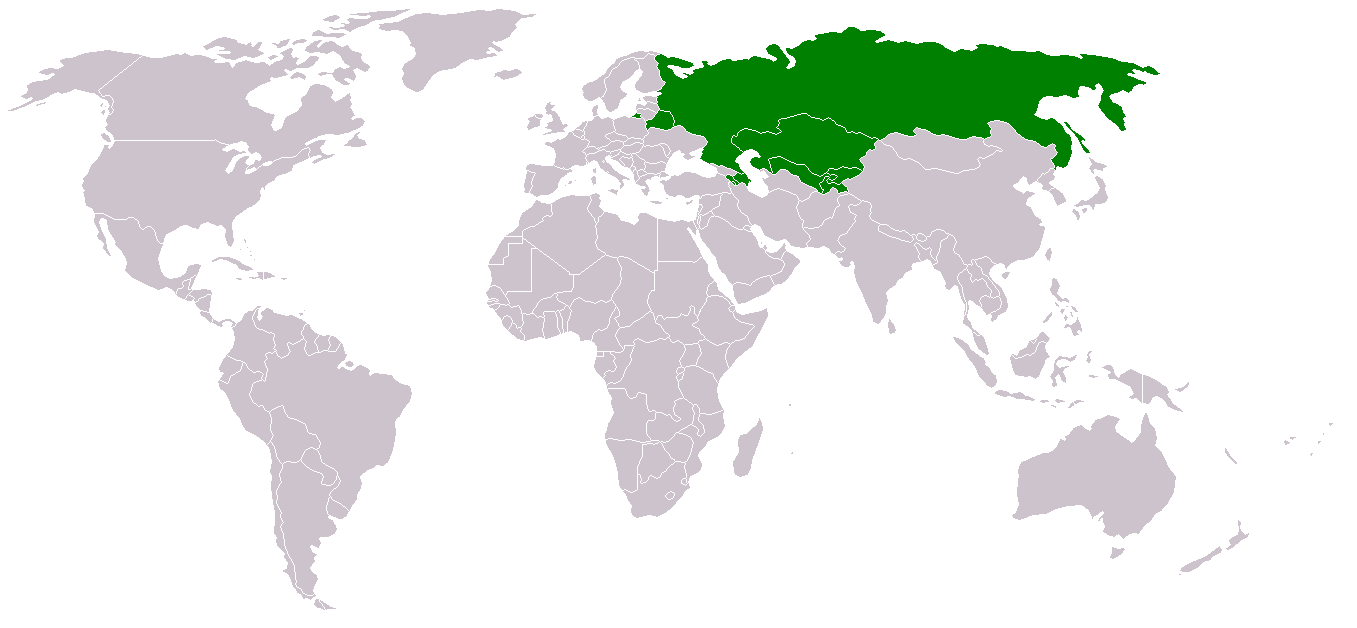
The 1994 CIS FTA Agreement signatories (all 12 countries). As of 2023, multilateral free trade regime under the 1999 Protocol has entered into force for Armenia, Azerbaijan, Belarus, Georgia, Kazakhstan, Kyrgyzstan, Moldova, Tajikistan, Uzbekistan and Ukraine while Russia and Turkmenistan refused to participate.

The 2011 Commonwealth of Independent States Free Trade Area among Russia, Ukraine, Belarus, Uzbekistan, Moldova, Armenia, Kyrgyzstan, Kazakhstan and Tajikistan

Although the countries of the Eurasian Economic Union have delegated their powers to conclude free trade in goods agreements to the supranational level according to the Treaty on the Eurasian Economic Union (Article 35), the previous agreements with third countries concluded before 1 January 2015 continue to be in force (Article 102). According to the Article 102: "Member States have the right to unilaterally grant preferences in trade with a third party on the basis of an international agreement concluded by 1 January 2015 of this Member State with such a third party or an international agreement to which all Member States are parties." Thus, agreements such as those within the Commonwealth of Independent States (the terms of the CIS FTA allow member states to enter into the FTA agreements with other countries, as well as to join/create custom unions) and bilateral agreements that do not regulate relations with third countries remain in force for their parties.

The 1994 CIS FTA Agreement, 1999 CIS FTA Protocol (multilateral free trade is in force among 10 countries) and 2011 CIS FTA Treaty (multilateral free trade is in force among 9 countries) have signed by all members of the EAEU. The multilateral free trade regime under the 1999 Protocol is not applied by Russia at all. As of 2023, the Protocol has entered into force for Armenia, Azerbaijan, Belarus, Georgia, Kazakhstan, Kyrgyzstan, Moldova, Tajikistan, Uzbekistan and Ukraine and 1 reservation was made by Azerbaijan on non-application in relation to Armenia and 2 specific opinions were expressed by Georgia and Ukraine.

2011 Commonwealth of Independent States Free Trade Area was negotiated before the establishment of the EEU on 1 January 2015. The CISFTA treaty came into force at different dates for every state. The treaty came into force in Armenia, Belarus, Kazakhstan and Russia at different dates between September and December 2012. Meanwhile, Kyrgyzstan applied the treaty starting 13 December 2013. In force since 2012, the 2011 multilateral CIS Free Trade Zone Treaty establishes a free trade area between Armenia, Belarus, Kazakhstan, Kyrgyzstan, Russia (now all EAEU member states), as well as Ukraine, Uzbekistan, Moldova and Tajikistan. Russia has suspended the Agreement with respect to Ukraine from 1 January 2016, following the provisional application of the DCFTA between the European Union and Ukraine. Ukraine did the same thing on 2 January with regard to Russia.

Thus, in addition to all previous multilateral agreements, the following agreements apply on a bilateral basis according to the article 102. Bilateral free trade agreements with Azerbaijan, Georgia, Turkmenistan, Serbia and Montenegro as well as "zero tariffs" agreements with Abkhazia and South Ossetia are in force in Russia. Bilateral free trade agreement with Turkmenistan is in force in Belarus. Bilateral free trade agreement with Turkmenistan is in force in Armenia. Bilateral free trade agreement with Serbia is in force in Kazakhstan.

=== Cooperation, Trade in Services and Investment Agreements ===
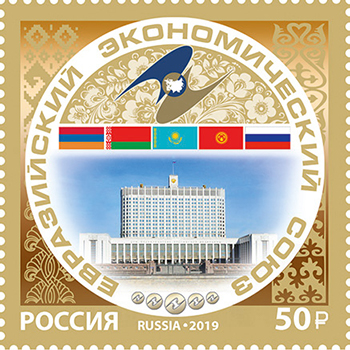
Eurasian Economic Union stamp

The members of the EAEU may conclude an agreement on investment and trade in services without the consent of EAEU supranational bodies, since these powers have not been transferred to a supranational level, however according to the Treaty on the Eurasian Economic Union (Article 35), an international treaty of the EAEU with a third party establishing a free trade regime may include other provisions related to foreign trade activities (i.e. Cooperation, Trade in Services and Investment). All Members of the Union retains autonomy (i.e., national competence) in matters of concluding agreements on free trade in services and investments. The process of concluding such agreements with third countries is carried out independently of the partners in the Union. The only condition prescribed in the Treaty on the EAEU is the obligation to provide to the Member States of the EAEU the same concessions, which are granted to the partner (partners) under that agreement (Article 38 of the Treaty and section 6 of Annex No. 16 to the Treaty).

The 2015 EAEU-Vietnam Free Trade Agreement & Economic Integration Agreement covers trade in goods and trade in services.

The Armenia–EU Comprehensive and Enhanced Partnership Agreement was signed by Armenia and all EU member states on 24 November 2017. The World Trade Organization classifies this agreement as an agreement on trade in services.

Russia has concluded 82 agreements on mutual protection of investments and investment promotion, including agreements with Cambodia, Iran, Morocco and the State of Palestine, which were signed after 1 January 2015. 65 agreements have entered into force.

On 8 June 2023, in Sochi, Armenia, Belarus, Kazakhstan, Kyrgyzstan, Russia, Tajikistan and Uzbekistan signed the Commonwealth of Independent States Agreement on Free Trade in Services, Establishment, Operations and Investment to partly integrate Uzbekistan and Tajikistan on the common standards of the WTO (General Agreement on Trade in Services) and the EAEU even without their membership in the WTO (Uzbekistan) or the EAEU (Uzbekistan and Tajikistan). Uzbekistan and Tajikistan have not decided to join the EAEU, but bringing country's legislation to the EAEU common standards can be considered as the first step.

The ambassador of the United Arab Emirates in Moscow said that the UAE is striving for a free trade agreement by the end of 2023 with the EAEU to include provisions on trade in services and investment.

On 22 August 2024, Belarus and China signed an agreement on trade in services and investment. Belarus is the first EAEU country with which China has concluded such an agreement.

On 27 June 2025, Belarus signed a free trade agreement in services and investments with the UAE.

On 7 August 2025, Russia signed a free trade agreement in services and investments with the UAE.

=== Unilateral preferences for economic assistance ===
The Generalized System of Preferences (GSP), instituted in 1971 under the aegis of UN Trade and Development, has contributed over the years to creating an enabling trading environment for developing countries. EAEU members are among the few countries in the world that provide preferential treatment, according to the UNCTAD website.

The EAEU has the Common System of Tariff Preferences for approved goods from 29 developing and 48 least-developed countries. As of 5 March 2021, they are Algeria, Bolivia, Vanuatu, Venezuela, Ghana, Honduras, Egypt, Zimbabwe, Iran, Cabo Verde, Cameroon, Kenya, Republic of the Congo, Democratic People’s Republic of Korea, Côte d'Ivoire, Cuba, Morocco, the Marshall Islands, Federal States of Micronesia, Mongolia, Nigeria, Nicaragua, Pakistan, Papua New Guinea, Tunisia, the Philippines, Sri Lanka, El Salvador, Eswatini on the 1 list and Angola, Islamic Republic of Afghanistan, Bangladesh, Benin, Burkina Faso, Burundi, Bhutan, Haiti, Gambia, Guinea, Guinea-Bissau, Djibouti, Zambia, Yemen, Cambodia, Kiribati, Union of the Comoros, Democratic Republic of the Congo, Lao People’s Democratic Republic, Lesotho, Liberia, Mauritania, Madagascar, Malawi, Mali, Mozambique, Myanmar, Nepal, Republic of the Niger, Palestine(according to the United Nations General Assembly Resolution 43/177), Rwanda, Democratic Republic of Sao Tome and Principe, Senegal, Syrian Arab Republic, Solomon Islands, Federal Republic of Somalia, Sudan, Sierra Leone, Tanzania, Timor-Leste, Togolese Republic, Tuvalu, Uganda, Central African Republic, Chad, Eritrea, Ethiopia, South Sudan on the 2nd list.

The system of tariff preferences is aimed at promoting the economic growth of countries that objectively need economic assistance from the Union. In 2021, a decision was published to exclude 75 developing countries and 2 least developed countries from the lists, but at the same time, the status of the beneficiary country of the common system of tariff preferences of the EAEU is preserved for states in need of economic assistance from the EAEU. The first list of countries was approved in 2009 and did not change dramatically until 2021. As of May 2020, there were 153 countries in it, including Turkey, Brazil, Argentina, China and South Korea. The list was revised in 2021 so that there would be no injustice when lower-income countries provide tariff preferences to high-income countries. A country can obtain for tariff preferences if its income level is determined by the World Bank as "low-income" or "lower-middle-income", that is, the gross national income per capita in such a country is less than $4,045. The import duties applicable to products eligible for tariff preferences and originating from developing countries were at the level of 75% of the Most favoured nation duty rates and from least-developed countries at the level of 0%.

At the same time, the members of the Union themselves are recipients of tariff preferences. Kyrgyzstan was granted preferences from Canada, the United Kingdom, the EU, Japan, Norway, Switzerland, Turkey and the United States. Armenia was granted preferences from Canada, the EU, Japan, Norway, Switzerland and the United States. Belarus was granted preferences from Japan, Norway and Switzerland. Kazakhstan was granted preferences from Japan, Norway, Switzerland and the United States. In 2013, the World Bank announced that Russia had graduated to a high-income economy based on the results of 2012 but in 2016 it was reclassified as an upper-middle income economy due to changes in the exchange rate of the Russian ruble, which is a floating currency. As a result of the World Bank's designation of a high-income economy, Barack Obama issued a proclamation: "I have determined that Russia is sufficiently advanced in economic development and improved in trade competitiveness that it is appropriate to terminate the designation of Russia as a beneficiary developing country effective October 3, 2014." U.S. Customs and Border Protection (CBP) indicated that Russia formally graduated from the GSP program on 4 October 2014. Thus, Russia does not have these preferences. In 2024, the World Bank again reclassified Russia as a high-income economy based on 2023 results.

== International cooperation and interaction ==
International cooperation and interaction with third countries, other integration associations and international organisations can happen under legal framework for international cooperation, including the Treaty on the Eurasian Economic Union, Procedure for the EAEU International Cooperation, Main Directions of the EAEU International Activities, Regulation on the Procedure for Admission of New Members to the EAEU and Termination of Membership in the EAEU, Regulation on the Observer State Status at the EAEU and Strategic Directions for Developing the Eurasian Economic Integration.

According to the commission's website, over the years memoranda, events and statements have been adopted with third countries and international organisations, including the Cabinet of Ministers of Ukraine, Ministry of Commerce of the People's Republic of China, United Nations Conference on Trade and Development (UNCTAD), United Nations Economic Commission for Europe, Ministry of Trade, Industry and Energy of the Republic of Korea, Ministry of Foreign Trade of the Republic of Ecuador, International Trade Center, MERCOSUR, and OECD.

The commission's website has published information and news on international cooperation (documents, memoranda, visits, summits, events, conferences, negotiations with officials, representatives and ambassadors, etc.) with dozens states (namely Austria, Angola, Bangladesh, Bolivia, Brazil, Venezuela, Guatemala, Germany, Greece, India, Indonesia, Jordan, Iran, Spain, Cambodia, Cameroon, Canada, Kenya, China, Colombia, Cuba, Luxembourg, Mauritius, Morocco, Mexico, Moldova, Mongolia, Myanmar, Nicaragua, New Zealand, UAE, Peru, Portugal, Serbia, Singapore, Slovakia, USA, Tajikistan, Thailand, Tunisia, Uzbekistan, Faroe Islands, Philippines, France, Czechia, Chile, Ethiopia) and dozens regional associations and international organisations (Andean Community, ASEAN, Asia-Pacific Economic Cooperation, BRICS, African Union, East African Community, Dialogue on Cooperation in Asia, European Union, Latin American Economic System (SELA), MERCOSUR, Organization for Security and Co-operation in Europe, Organization of the Black Sea Economic Cooperation, Subsystem for economic integration in Central America, CICA, CIS, Union State of Russia and Belarus, Pacific Alliance, Shanghai Cooperation Organisation, Economic Community of Central African States (ESCA), ECOSOC, United Nations Economic and Social Commission for Asia and the Pacific, UNCTAD). According to the commission's website, for the purpose of forming favourable conditions for the development of interaction with the EAEU and as the first step to institutionalise cooperation, it has become a practice in the EEC to conclude memoranda of cooperation (third countries, regional integration associations and international organisations). Broad cooperation in the format of memoranda of cooperation is established with the governments of Bangladesh, Jordan, Indonesia, Cambodia, Cuba, Morocco, Moldova, Mongolia, Peru, Singapore, Thailand, the Faroe Islands and Chile, as well as with the Andean Community, the Association of South East Asian Nations (ASEAN), the African Union, the Pacific Alliance, the Latin American Economic System (SELA) and the Southern Common Market (MERCOSUR). The EEC interacts with the Government of Greece in the format of a joint declaration.

There are various formats of interaction between third states and the Eurasian Economic Union. One of the simplest formats is obtaining the observer status at the Union. The Supreme Eurasian Economic Council, the highest supranational body of the Eurasian Economic Union, granted observer state status to the Republic of Moldova, the Republic of Cuba and the Republic of Uzbekistan.

=== Foreign affairs ===
The Eurasian Economic Union mainly uses its arms industry, raw materials, gas and oil reserves, and railways as its key assets for trade with foreign countries.

Although Russia and Belarus are the only members of the Eurasian Economic Union under the sanctions from the West, other members of the Eurasian Economic Union have repeatedly used the bloc as a platform to articulate their opposition to sanctions and trade wars.

=== Economic partners ===
The Eurasian Economic Union must negotiate as a whole to sign free trade agreements with other countries. Key players for the Eurasian Economic Union are the European Union, Turkey, Iran, China and the Korean peninsula. The EAEU has sought to increase its trade with partners in the Middle East and East Asia in order to profit from the growing trade between Europe and Asia.

Because of disagreements with the Eurasian Economic Union's largest member, Russia, the European Union does not officially recognise the Eurasian Economic Union. Tensions with the European Union in 2014 have led both unions to pressure post-Soviet states to join their integration unions. Both sides have accused each other of carving spheres of influence. Members of the union, especially Russia have tried to diversify their trade by signing economic agreements with China, Iran and Turkey. Trade with North and South Korea has also risen.

A rising China has been increasingly interested in Central Asia and the Eurasian Economic Union. Analysts see the union as a potential way China could facilitate its investments in the region. Historically, China held close economic ties with many countries throughout Eurasia. Under the Han Dynasty, its trade routes extended to the Roman Empire. The Economy of the Han Dynasty and other subsequent dynasties exchanged numerous goods with countries throughout Europe and Asia. Both China and the union have stated they would benefit from recreating trade routes modelled on the historic Silk Road.

Railways transport goods from China to the European Union through Kazakhstan and Russia. The country has pushed for the construction of more railway lines to connect Berlin to east China to reduce shipping time. It proposed major high-speed railway lines going towards Europe via Russia and Kazakhstan and another through the Middle East via Tajikistan, a potential future member for the union. China has signed numerous energy deals with Russia and Kazakhstan, as it tries to move from coal to less pollutant alternatives.

Iran has sought to diversify its economy as well, seeing the EAEU and China as key economic partners. Relations between Russia and Iran have increased as both countries are under U.S. sanctions and are seeking new trade partners. in 2014 the two countries signed a historic US$20 billion energy deal. A free trade agreement between Iran and the Eurasian Economic Union came into force on 27 October 2019.

Kazakhstan seeks to enhance its ties with Turkey, a key player in the region. In July 2014, Turkey announced closer economic ties with the EAEU, including a possible free trade agreement in the near future.

=== Armenia and Nagorno-Karabakh ===
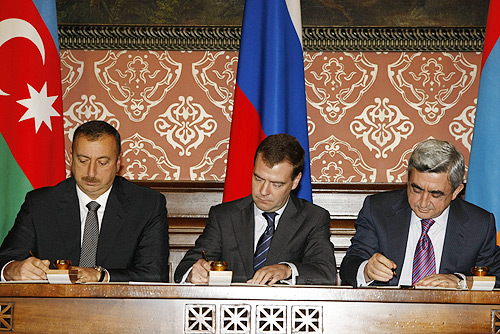
Azerbaijani President Ilham Aliyev, Russian president Dmitry Medvedev and Armenian president Serzh Sargsyan hold peace talks in Moscow on 2 November 2008.

In September 2013, Armenia announced its intentions of joining the Customs Union of Belarus, Kazakhstan and Russia. At the time of joining the Union, the Republic of Armenia already had preferential treatment within the framework of the CIS as a party to the Free Trade Zone Agreement of 18 October 2011, and therefore enjoyed significant tariff benefits. According to an IMF representative in Armenia, Armenia's membership to the Eurasian Economic Union resulted in about $250 million a year in customs revenue. Armenia also benefited in the form of secured privileges for 752 products until 2020, which implies no EAEU tariffs due to Union membership. Joining the Union allowed the country to get even more tangible economic effects due to the functioning of the Common Economic Space, the use of common technical regulation, sanitary and phytosanitary measures, non-tariff regulation. Such results confirm that for the implementation of full-scale freedom of movement of goods, liberalisation of tariff regulation alone is not enough. The region of Nagorno-Karabakh, however, is disputed between Armenia and Azerbaijan. Tensions rose further in the Caucasus region on 30 July 2014 due to clashes between Armenian and Azerbaijani soldiers.

Experts estimated that with the accession of Armenia, the internationally unrecognised Nagorno-Karabakh Republic would not be integrated into the Eurasian Union. Armenia is a permanent political, military and economic ally of Russia, whereas Azerbaijan holds close ties with Armenia's long-standing enemy Turkey. The Kazakh president Nursultan Nazarbayev expressed concern in 2013 that no reliable customs border between Armenia and Nagorno-Karabakh could be drawn. However, Nazarbayev expressed that he holds all the existing disagreements preventing Armenia's integration into Eurasian Economic Union are surmountable. The chairman of the Foreign Policy Committee in the Armenian Parliament, Artak Zakarian, announced on 14 May 2014 that Armenia will not build any customs borders, including with the region of Nagorno-Karabakh.

Following the 2023 Azerbaijani offensive in Nagorno-Karabakh, the Nagorno-Karabakh Republic ceased to exist.

According to Eurasian Economic Commission statistics, Eurasian Economic Union countries experienced a 1.9% GDP increase between January–June 2018, compared to the same period in 2017. Armenia had the greatest GDP growth index throughout the reporting period – 8.3%. The EEU's industrial output increased by 3.3%, with reprocessing industry increasing by 62.7% and mining increasing by 27.9%. Again, Armenia had the largest growth in industrial production – 9.6% – despite a 12.7% fall in mining.

=== Uzbekistan, Tajikistan and Kyrgyzstan ===
Previously, Tajikistan was on track to become a potential member of the union, having signed the treaty on the Eurasian Customs Union and the Single Economic Space. However, due to border disputes between Kyrgyzstan and Tajikistan, the integration process in Tajikistan has stalled. Both countries exchanged fire in December 2013 and August 2014, which resulted in casualties. Both countries have since announced they would resolve conflicts and improve border cooperation. Officials hope to make significant progress by the end of 2015. In March 2020, Uzbekistan announced that it wished to become a Eurasian Union observer state.

=== International response ===
Former president of the European Commission José Manuel Barroso stated at the World Economic Forum that the EU supports the regional integration, including the Eurasian Union. He also praised Kazakhstan for joining the bloc. He criticised the post-Soviet space, saying "the integration in the region is not sufficient". However, he warned that the Russo-Ukrainian War is a major obstacle to good cooperation between the EU and the Eurasian Union.

Tensions between the EAEU and the European Union (EU) occurred as both have sought to deepen their ties with several former Soviet republics. The EU has signed free trade agreements with Ukraine, Moldova and Georgia. However, separatists in all three countries back closer ties with Russia. Ukraine planned to sign an EU association agreement in 2013, but abruptly cancelled the signing under Russian pressure to join the EAEU. This led to mass protests against Ukraine's president, with the EU supporting a failed political settlement before president Yanukovych fled to Russia, and Russia then annexing the Crimean peninsula (following a disputed referendum) and supporting separatists in Eastern Ukraine. In response, some member states of the European Union have sought to find alternatives to Russian gas, while others have voiced their support for the construction of the South Stream pipeline which circumvents Ukraine. Later the already started construction of the pipeline, under US sanctions on Russia and pressure on EU, the project was abandoned. Analysts believe Russia backs the Eurasian Economic Union in order to limit western influence in the region.

Western analysts generally see the Eurasian Economic Union as a way to reunite many of the former Soviet republics. For example, Washington Post author Abigail Hauslohner wrote the treaty was intended "to further bolster [Russia]'s ties to former Soviet republics." The United States expressed its opposition to the Eurasian Union, claiming it is "an attempt" to re-establish a USSR-type union among the former Soviet republics. In December 2012, former Secretary of State Hillary Clinton claimed "It's not going to be called that [Soviet Union]. It's going to be called customs union, it will be called the Eurasian Union and all of that, but let's make no mistake about it. We know what the goal is and we are trying to figure out effective ways to slow down or prevent it".

Kazakhstan's president Nursultan Nazarbayev called it "a hard-won achievement" and "a blessing for our people." Public support in Kazakhstan for the country's accession to the EAEU stood at 68% in June 2014, with 5.5% opposed.

Thailand, Iran, New Zealand, Tunisia, Turkey, and Vietnam are among the countries that expressed a desire to conclude trade agreements with the new Eurasian Economic Union after the treaty was signed. In 2018, the Faroe Islands signed a new memorandum of understanding with the EEU. The MoU is designed to boost trade and cooperation between the two sides.

=== Existing integration projects ===
A clickable Euler diagram showing the relationships among various supranational organisations in the territory of the former Soviet Union

The Eurasian Customs Union has already brought partial economic integration between the three states, and the Eurasian Economic Union is said to be a continuation of this customs union. However, the impact or legacy of that agreement is unclear – trade between the three states actually fell 13% during the agreement's first year.

A number of other regional organisations also provide the basis for further integration: the Union State of Russia and Belarus; the Collective Security Treaty Organisation, consisting of Armenia, Belarus, Kazakhstan, Kyrgyzstan, Russia and Tajikistan; and the Commonwealth of Independent States comprising most of the post-Soviet countries.

== Geography ==
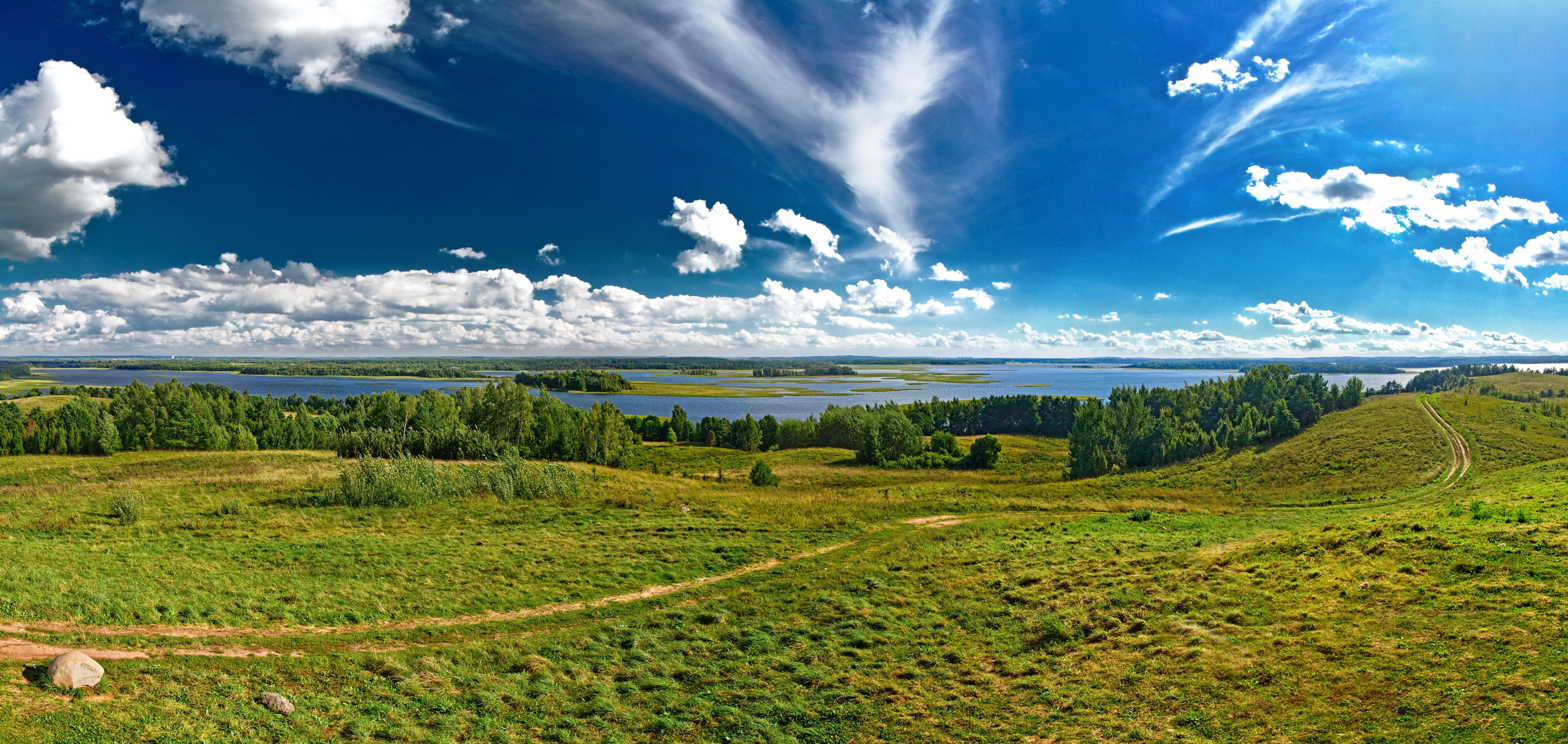
Strusta Lake in the Vitebsk Region, Belarus, is the sixteenth largest lake in Belarus and the third largest among the Braslau Lakes.

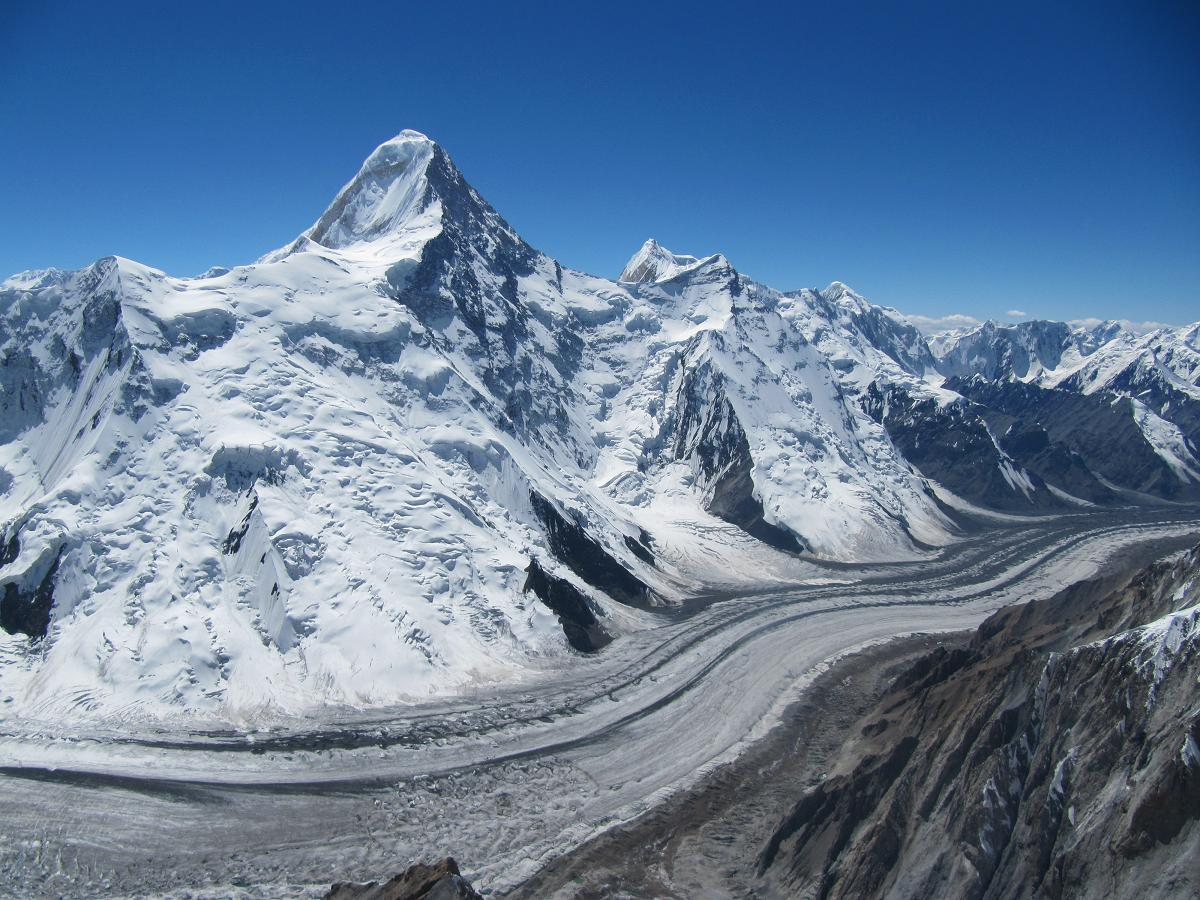
The Khan Tengri Peak above North Engilchek Glacier, Kazakhstan

The Eurasian Economic Union is located at the eastern end of Europe, bounded by the Arctic in the north, the Pacific Ocean to the east and East Asia, the Middle East and part of Central Asia to the south. It lies between latitudes 39° and 82°N and longitudes 19°E and 169°W. The union extends across much of northern Eurasia. Its member states cover an area of over 20,000,000 square kilometres, which is approximately 15% of the world's land surface.

The Eastern European Plain encompasses Belarus and most of European Russia. The plain is mostly mountain-free and comprises several plateaus. Russia's northernmost regions are tundra. The Russian Tundra is located on the coastline with the Arctic and is known for its total darkness in the winter. Taiga reaches Russia's southern borders in Siberia and accounts for 60% of the country. Towards the Ural Mountains and in northern Kazakhstan, the climate is mostly temperate. Southwestern Russia and Kazakhstan are mostly steppe. The Kazakh steppe covers one-third of Kazakhstan and is the world's largest dry steppe region. Armenia is mostly mountainous and its climate is continental. The landlocked country shares no direct border with other members states. It is located in the southwestern part of Asia, occupying the northeastern part of the Armenian plateau, and is located between the Caucasus and the Near East.

A large number of lakes and rivers are found in the Eurasian Economic Union. Major lakes include Ladoga and Onega, two of the largest lakes in Europe. The largest and most prominent of the union's bodies of fresh water is Lake Baikal, the world's deepest, purest, oldest and most capacious fresh water lake. The Baikal lake alone contains over one-fifth of the world's fresh surface water. Russia is second only to Brazil in volume of the total renewable water resources. Of the union's numerous rivers, the Volga is the most famous, not only because it is the longest in Europe, but also because of its major role in history. In Siberia the Ob, Yenisey, Lena and Amur are among the longest rivers in the world.

The Eurasian Economic Union's highest peak is the Khan Tengri in the Tian Shan mountains, Kazakhstan, 7,010 m above sea level. The lowest point in the Eurasian Economic Union is the Karagiye Depression in Kazakhstan. Kazakhstan's Caspian shore includes some of the lowest elevations on Earth. According to a 2005 estimate by the United Nations, forests cover 40% of Belarus. 11,000 lakes and many water streams are found in the country. Russia is known for its extensive mineral and energy resources, the largest reserves in the world, making it the world's largest producer of oil and natural gas.

According to estimates, the Eurasian Economic Union's population of 176 million people is mostly urbanised, with Russia and Belarus having over 70% of their population living in urban areas. In Armenia over 64% of the population lives in urban areas. Kazakhstan's urban population comprises 54% of the country's total population.

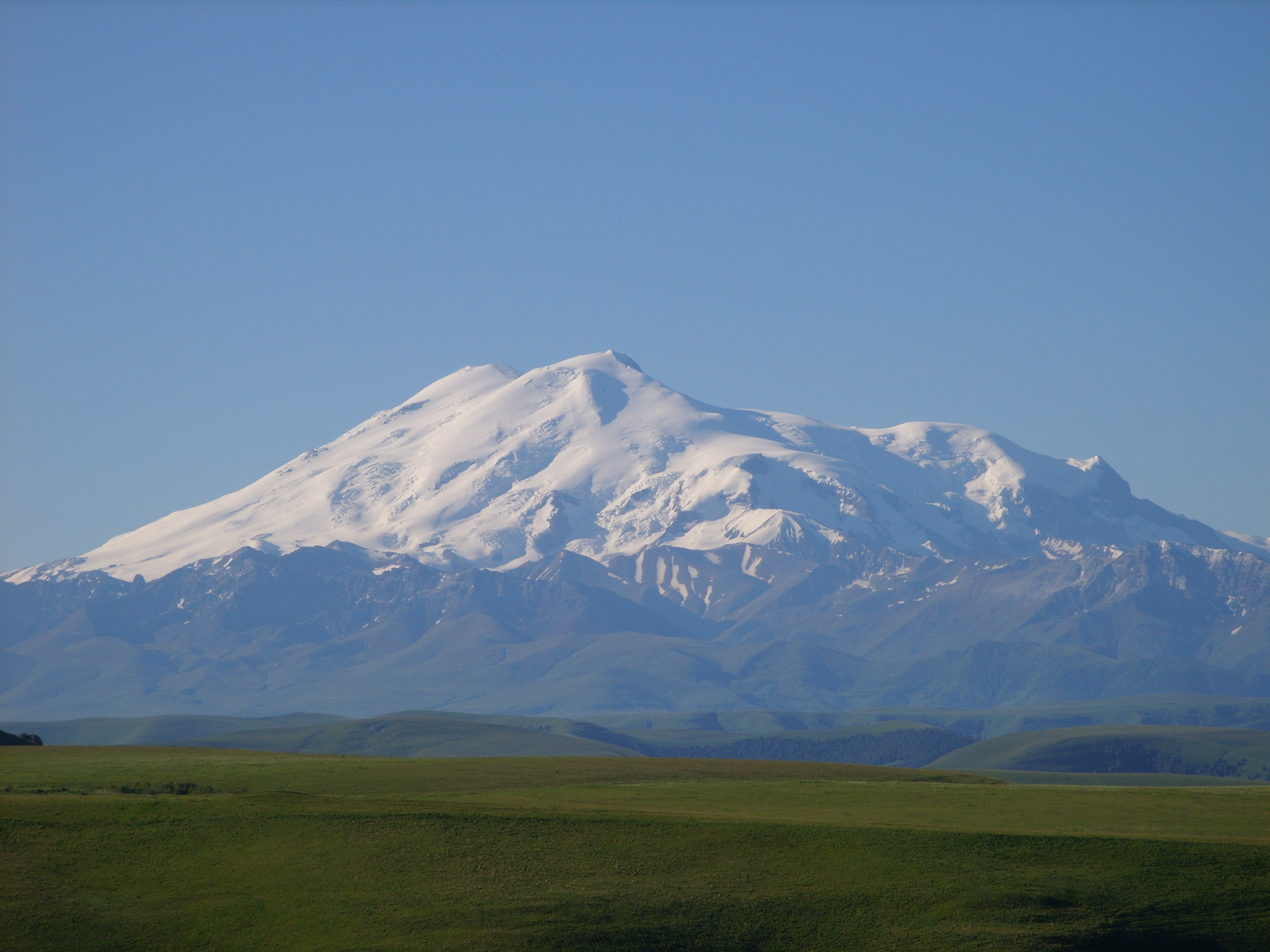
Mount Elbrus – Russia

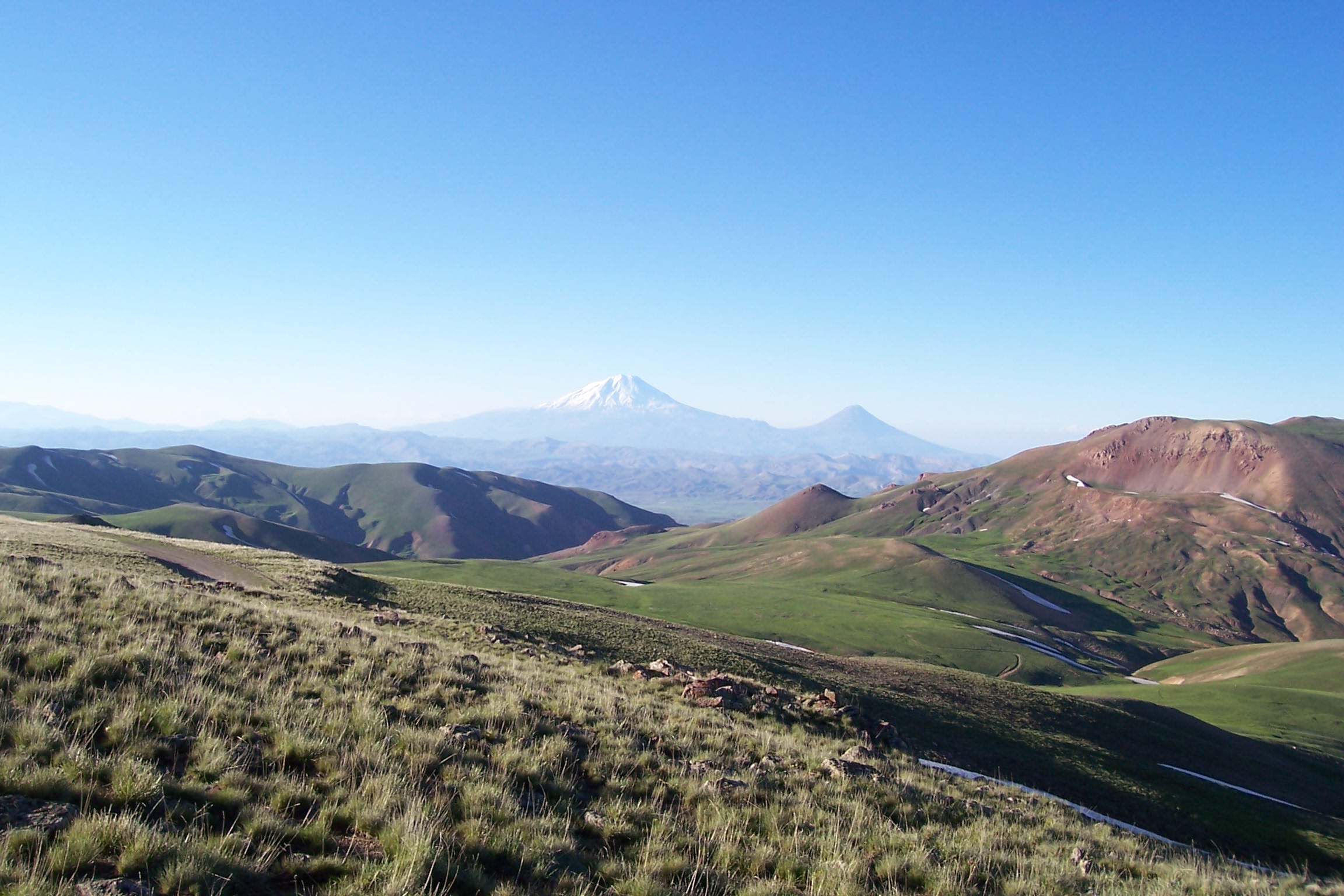
Mountain range – Armenia

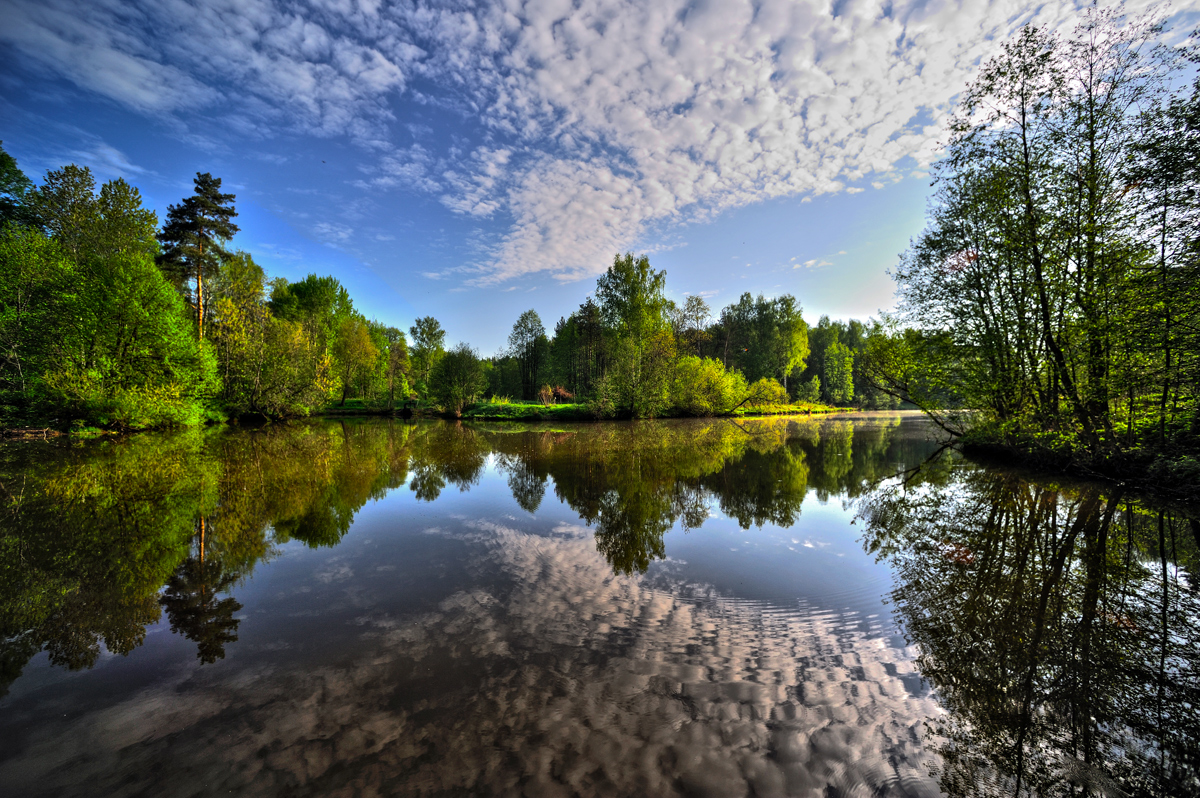
Lama River – in the Moscow region of Russia

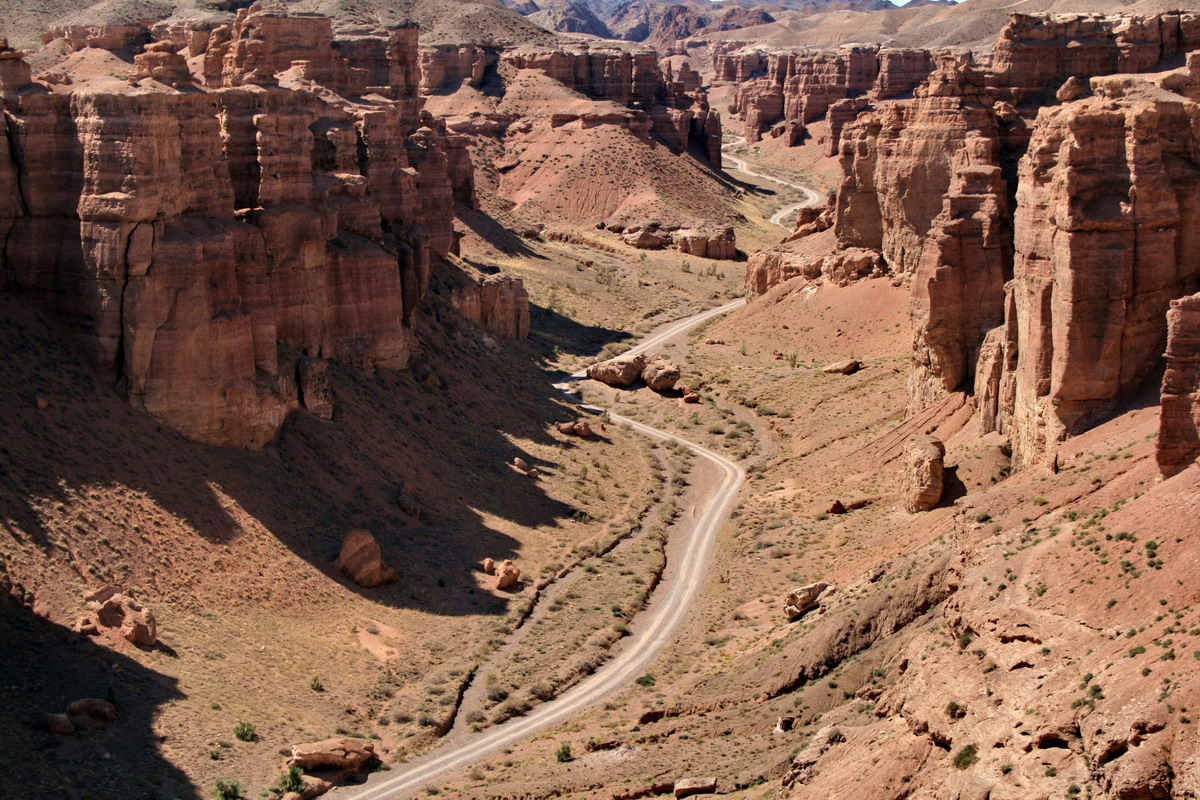
Sharyn Canyon – Kazakhstan

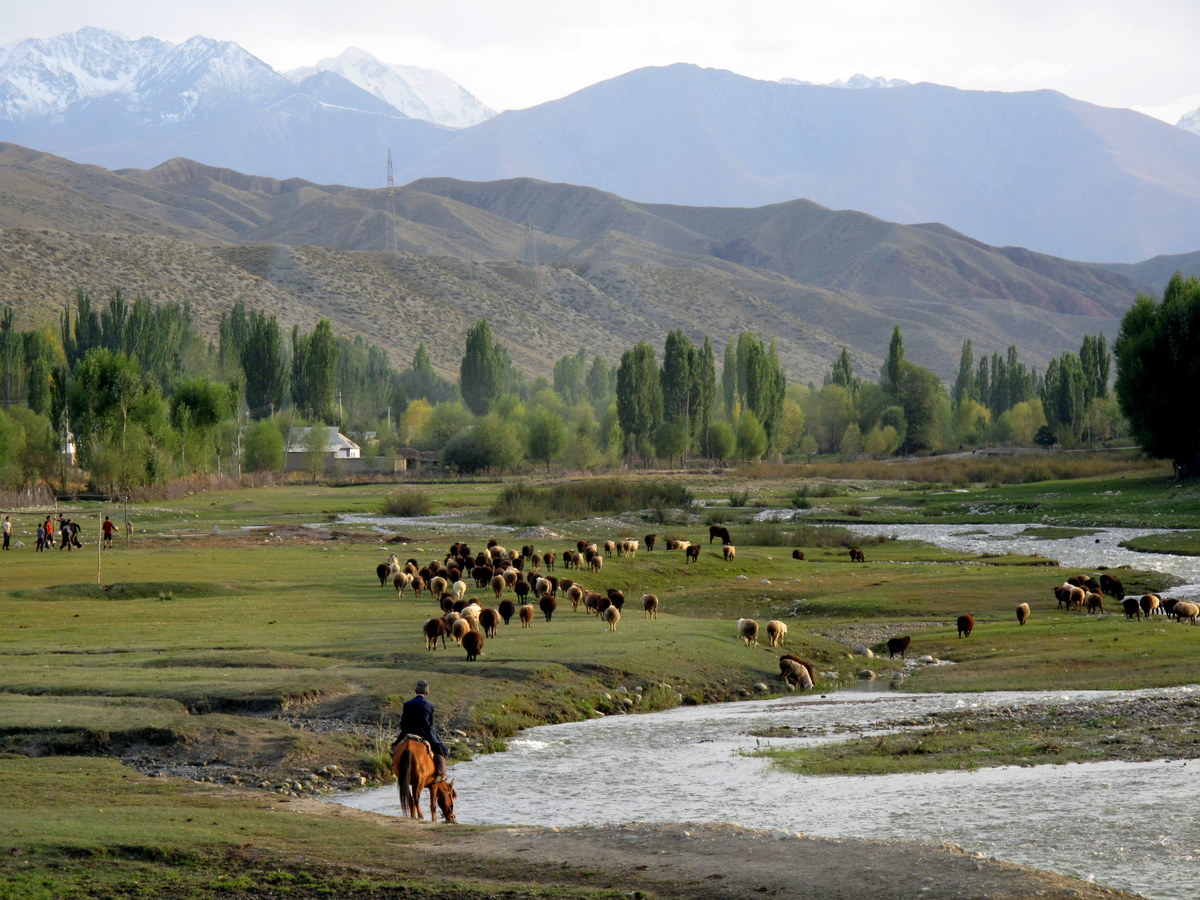
On the southern shore of Issyk-Kul lake, Issyk-Kul Region – Kyrgyzstan

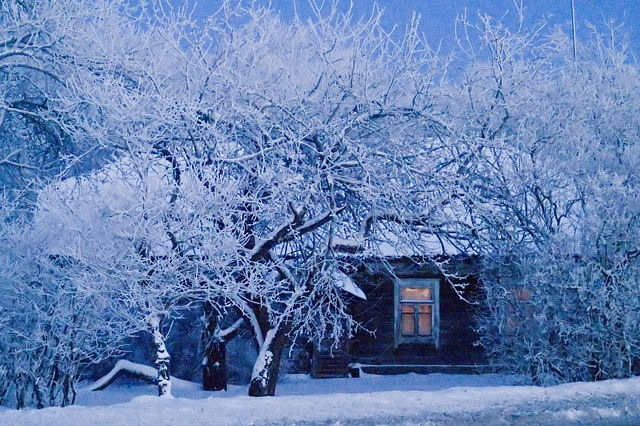
Winter – Belarus

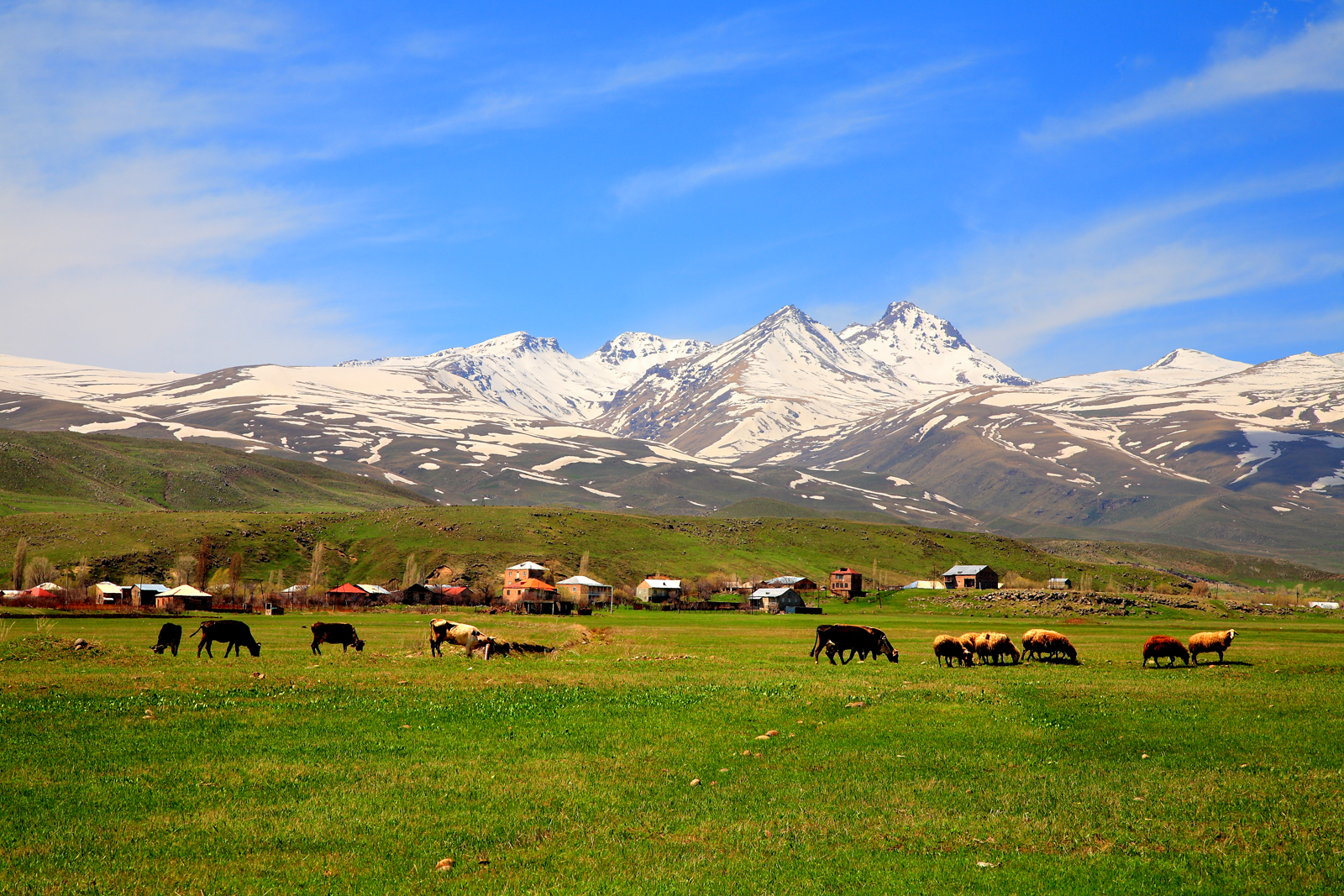
A view of Mount Aragats from Aragatsotn – Armenia

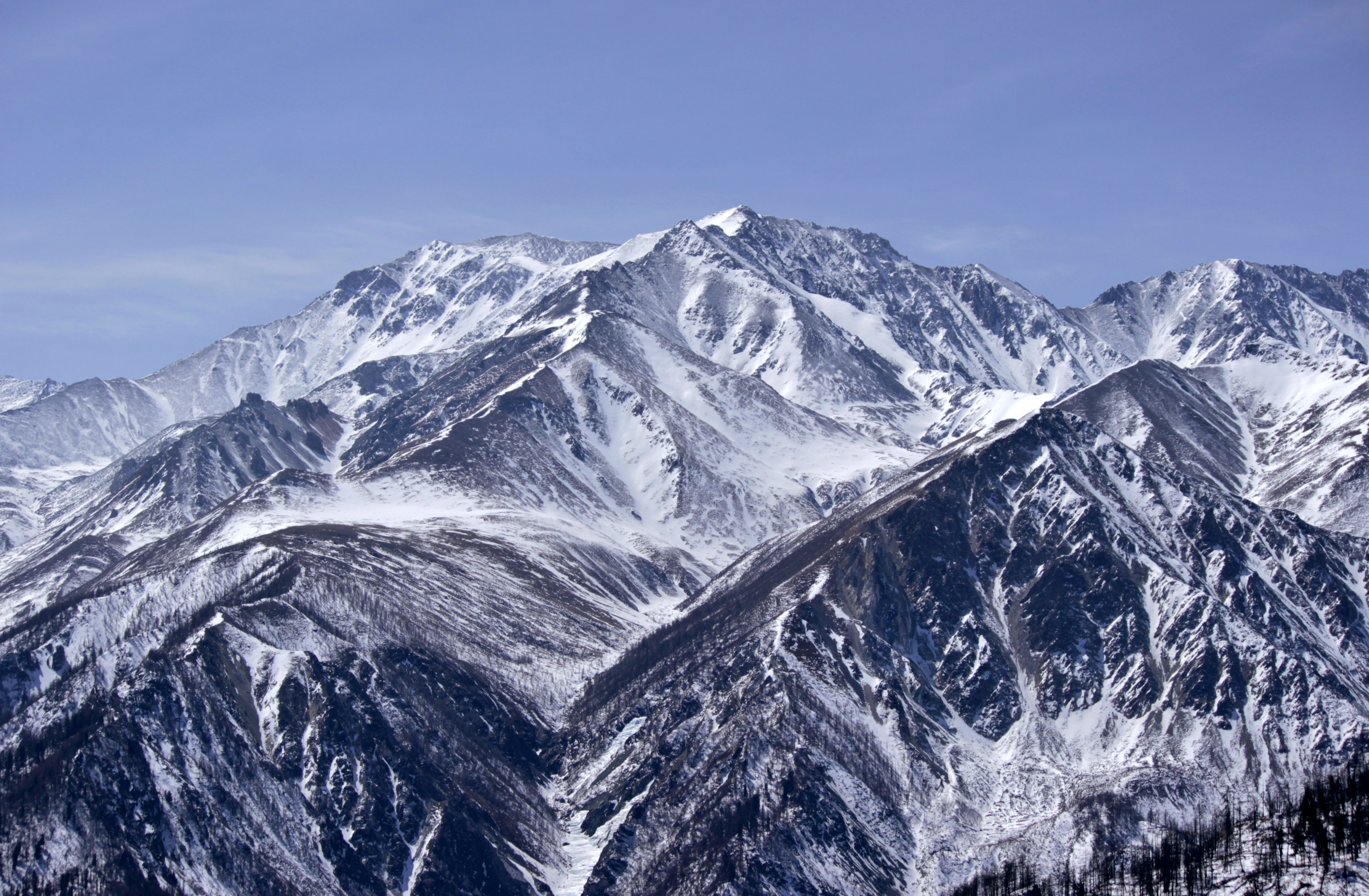
A view of Mount Mönkh Saridag – Okinsky District, Russia

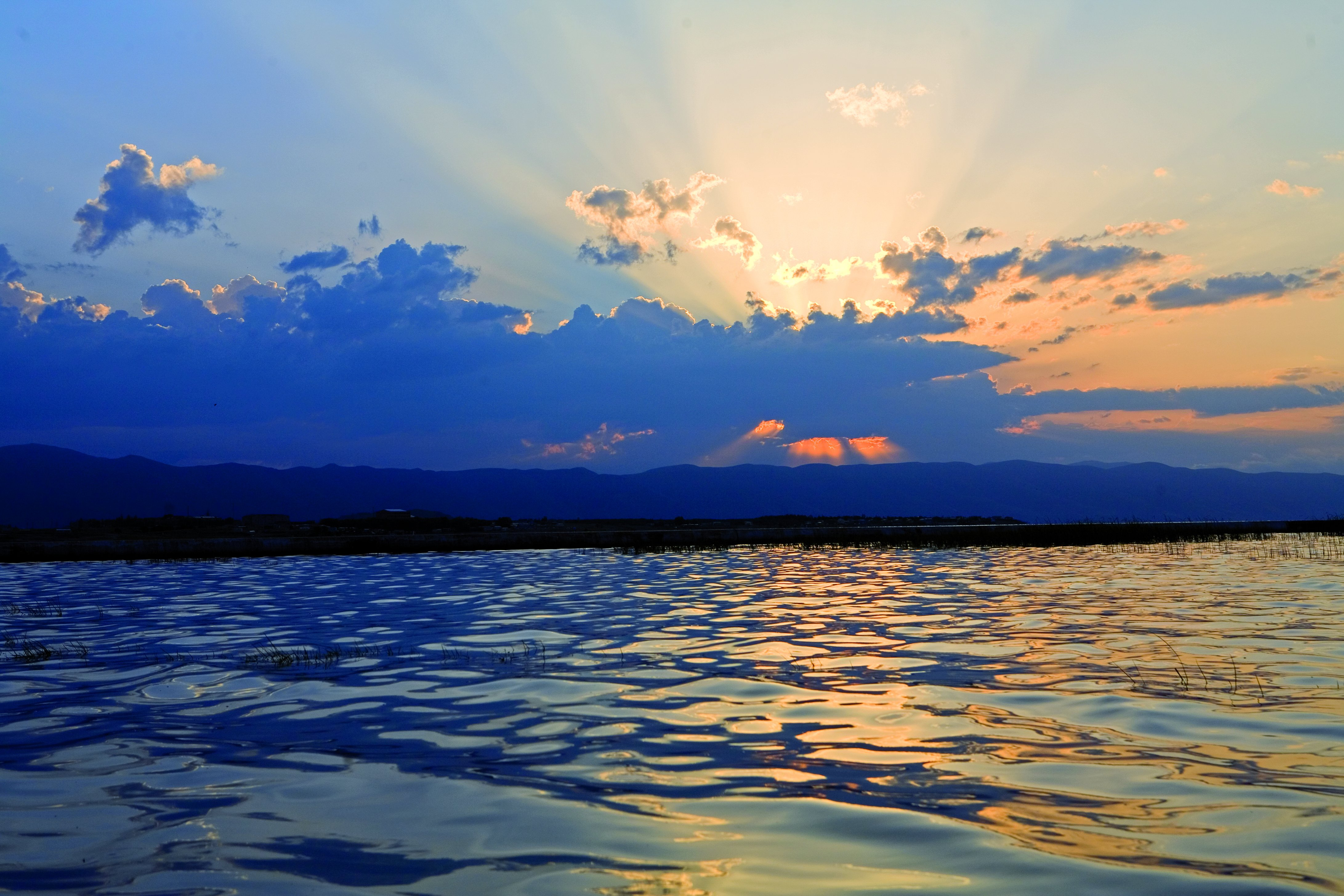
Lake Ayger – Armenia

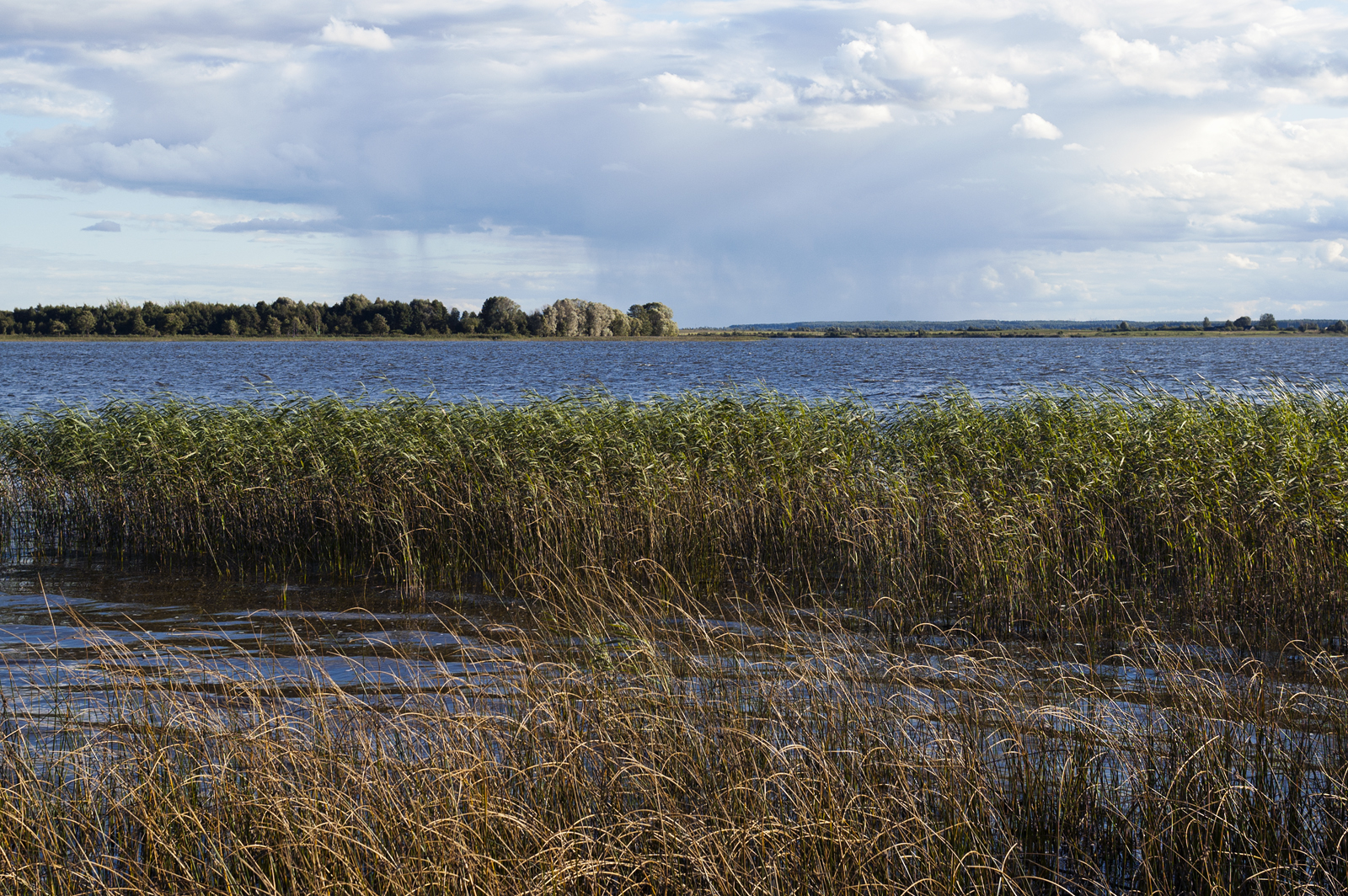
Lake Servech – Belarus

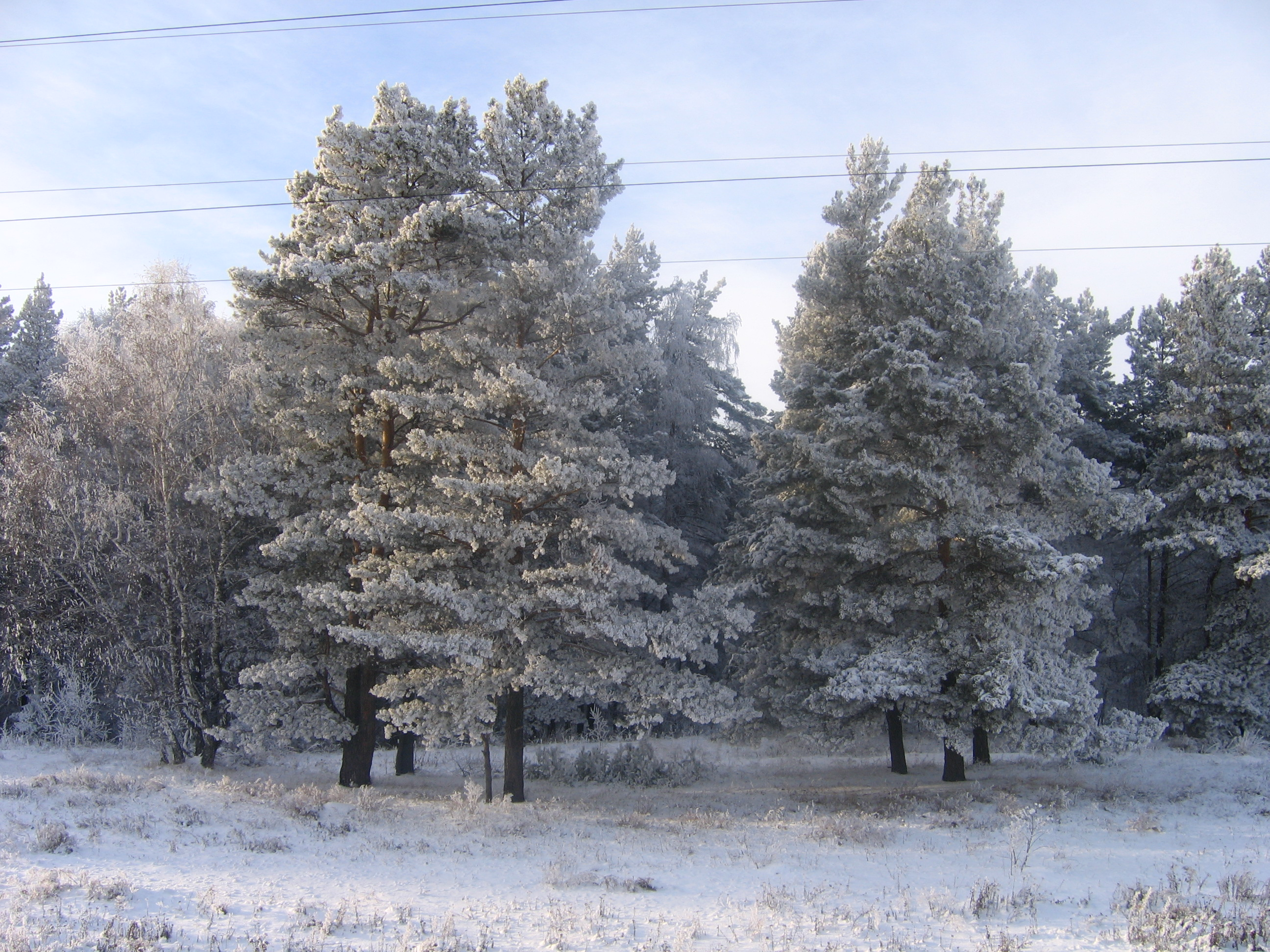
Winter in the Altai Krai – Russia

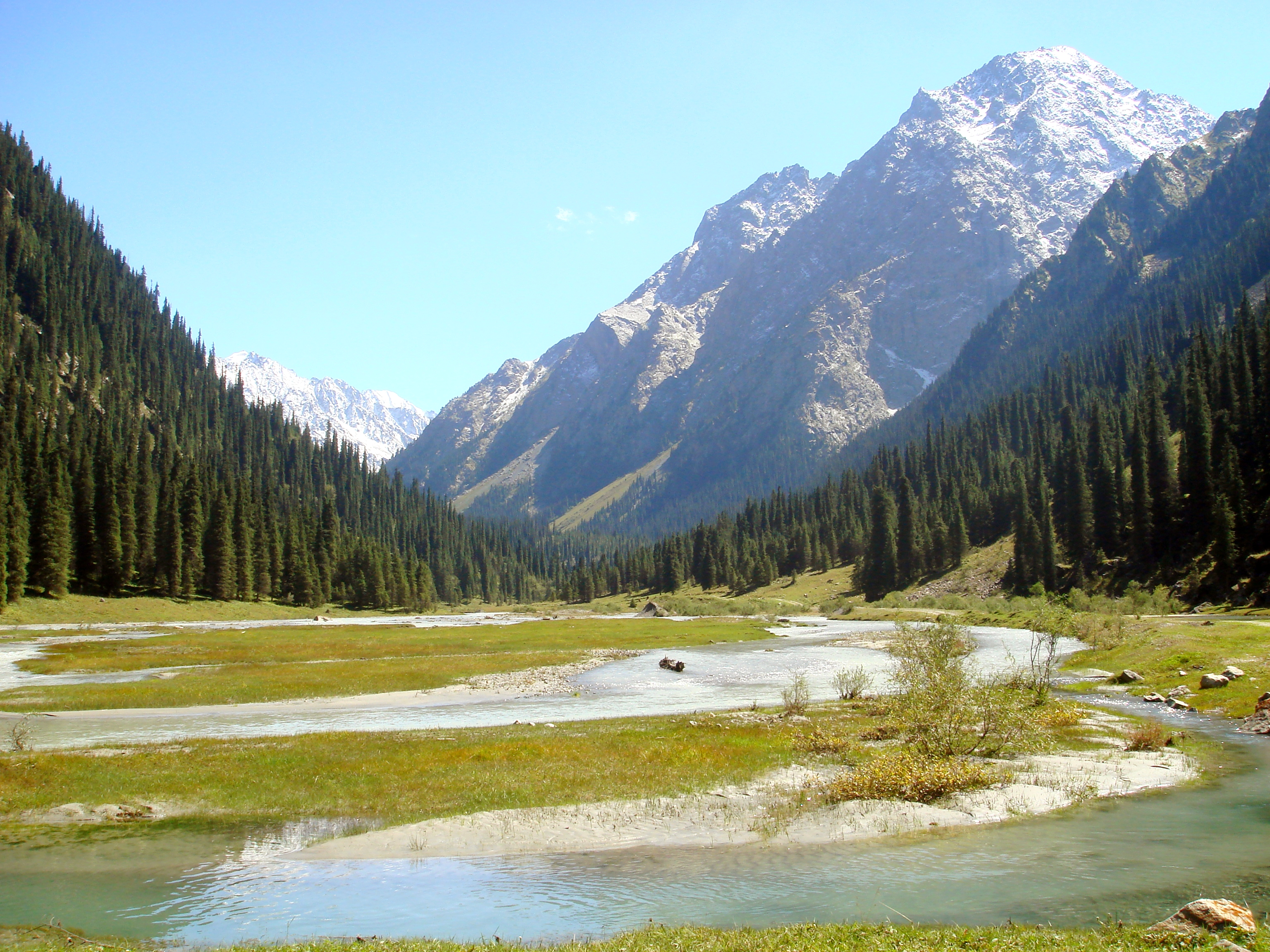
Tian Shan mountain range – Kyrgyzstan

== Demographics ==
The combined population of all member states is 185,332,000 as of 2024.

Largest cities or towns in Eurasian Union Russia, Kazakhstan, Belarus, Kyrgyzstan, Armenia
Rank		Member state	Pop.	Rank		Member state	Pop.
1	Moscow	Russia	13,149,803	11	Nizhny Novgorod	Russia	1,204,985
2	Saint Petersburg	Russia	5,597,763	12	Chelyabinsk	Russia	1,177,058
3	Almaty	Kazakhstan	2,275,541	13	Ufa	Russia	1,163,304
4	Minsk	Belarus	1,992,862	14	Samara	Russia	1,158,952
5	Novosibirsk	Russia	1,633,851	15	Bishkek	Kyrgyzstan	1,145,044
6	Yekaterinburg	Russia	1,536,183	16	Rostov-on-Don	Russia	1,140,487
7	Astana	Kazakhstan	1,502,102	17	Krasnodar	Russia	1,138,654
8	Kazan	Russia	1,318,604	18	Omsk	Russia	1,104,485
9	Shymkent	Kazakhstan	1,246,661	19	Yerevan	Armenia	1,098,900
10	Krasnoyarsk	Russia	1,205,473	20	Voronezh	Russia	1,046,425

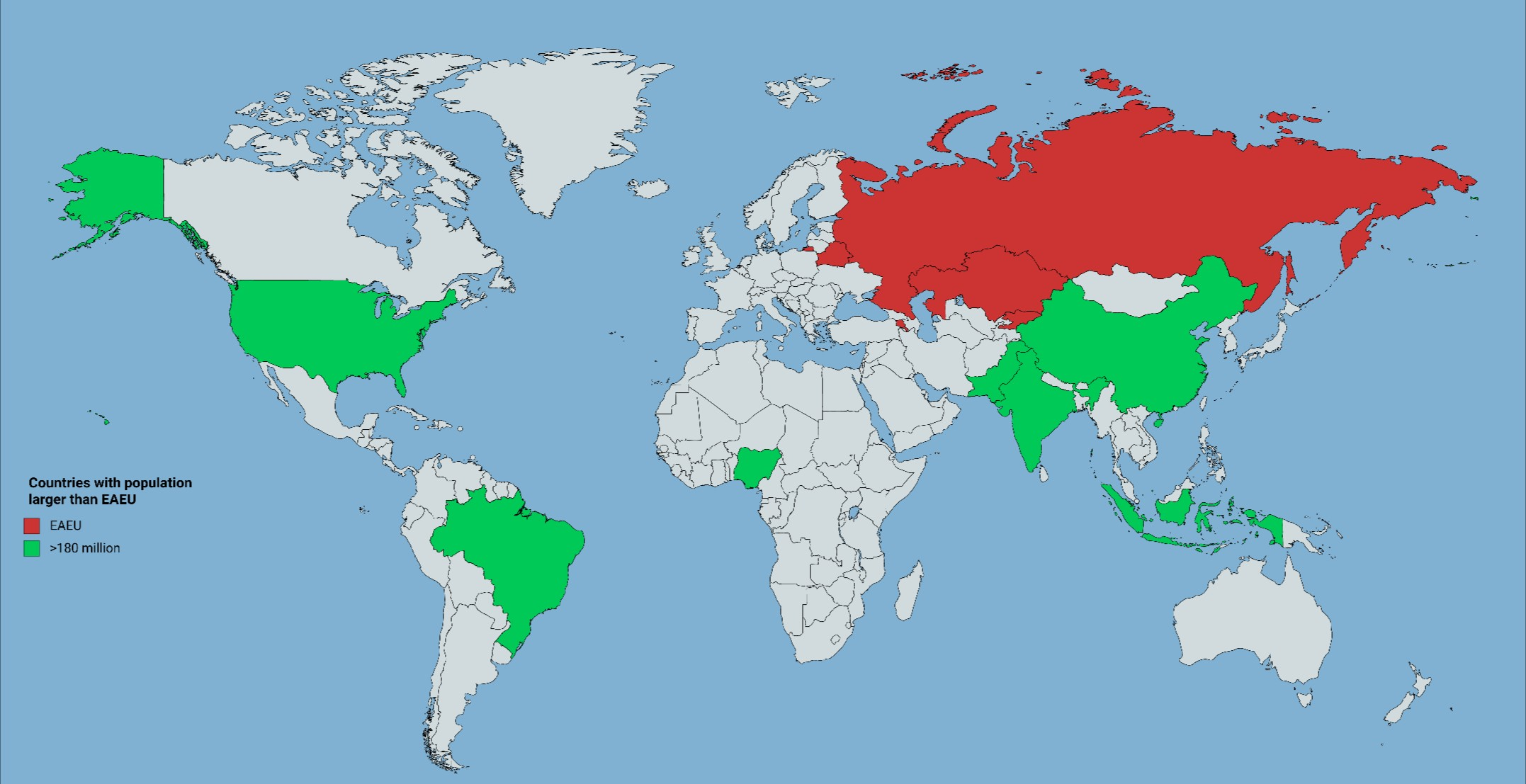
Countries with population larger than Eurasian Economic Union in 2018

The Eurasian Economic Union has 22 cities with more than 1 million inhabitants, the largest being Moscow. The most densely populated areas are the capital cities of member states and European Russia. Siberia is the region with the least inhabitants. In Russia about 160 different ethnic groups and indigenous peoples live within the country's borders. Kazakhstan and Belarus are home to sizeable ethnic Russian minorities. Though the member states of the Eurasian Economic Union's populations are comparatively large, its density is low because of the enormous size of Russia and Kazakhstan. The Eurasian Economic Union's average birth rate in 2010 was roughly 12.5 births per 1000 people, higher than the European Union, which has an average of 9.90 births per 1000 people.

== See also ==
- Economic Cooperation Organization
- ASEAN
- Collective Security Treaty Organization
- Comecon
- Community for Democracy and Rights of Nations
- Enlargement of the Eurasian Economic Union
- Eurasian economic integration
- Eurasian Economic Community
- Eurasian Patent Convention
- Eurasian Patent Organisation
- Eurasianism
- Soviet Union
- New Union Treaty
- Union State
- Warsaw Pact
- List of multilateral free-trade agreements

== Notes and references ==
=== References ===
Journal articles and studies

Online sources
