= Common Economic Space of the Commonwealth of Independent States =

Common market of post-Soviet states

Euler diagram of the supranatural organizations and treaties within the Common Economic Space of the Commonwealth of Independent States.

The Common Economic Space is the goal and the result of the process of economic integration of post-Soviet states envisaged by Article 7 of the Agreement on the creation the Commonwealth of Independent States signed on 8 December 1991. According to Article 7, the High Contracting Parties indicate that through common coordinating institutions, their joint activities will consist in coordinating foreign policy activities, cooperation in the formation and development of a common economic space, common European and Eurasian markets, in the field of customs policy, in the development of transport and communication systems, cooperation in the field of environmental protection, migration policy and the fight against organized crime.

The former Soviet republics that became independent states were part of the economy of the Soviet Union with its common technical standards, common infrastructure, territorial proximity, chains of cooperation, and common legal heritage. Through the signing of international agreements on trade, economic cooperation and integration, countries can achieve an increase in the efficiency of their economies, which suffered due to the disintegration of the Soviet Union. At the same time, all post-Soviet countries have moved to a market economy, implemented reforms and expanded trade and cooperation with the global economy. Over the past three decades, several negotiations have taken place and not all proposed integration projects have been successful.

== Background ==
In 1989, the European-Asian Union was proposed by the co-chairman of the Interregional Deputy Group Andrei Sakharov and with the participation of members of the group Galina Starovoitova, Anatoly Sobchak and others. Sakharov presented Gorbachev with his draft Constitution of the Union of Soviet Republics of Europe and Asia on 27 November 1989.

The New Union Treaty was a draft treaty that would have replaced the 1922 Treaty on the Creation of the USSR to salvage and reform the Soviet Union as a renewed federation. A ceremony of the signing the treaty was scheduled for 20 August 1991, but was prevented by the August Coup a day earlier. By September 1991, support for continuing the Soviet system had transitioned into reforming the Soviet Union into a confederation (not a federation) of sovereign states. However, this also did not succeed.

=== Transition period and the Treaty on the Economic Community ===
The Committee for Operational Management of the National Economy of the USSR was established by the Decree of the President of the USSR “On the Cabinet of Ministers of the USSR” of 24 August 1991. Ivan Silayev, Chairman of the Council of Ministers of the RSFSR, was appointed to head the Committee. On 5 September 1991 the Law of the USSR “On the bodies of state power and administration of the Union of Soviet Socialist Republics in the transition period” was signed. According to it, the coordination of management of the national economy, economic reforms and social policy were entrusted to the Inter-Republican Economic Committee (IEC), which was being created by the Union Republics on a parity basis. According to the decree of the President of the USSR of 6 September, the Committee was to cease its activity from the moment the IEC began its work. On 20 September, Ivan Silayev was appointed Chairman of the IEC.

On 18 October 1991, in the St. George Hall of the Grand Kremlin Palace Mikhail Gorbachev and the leaders of eight Union republics (excluding Ukraine, Moldova, Georgia and Azerbaijan) signed the Treaty on the Economic Community (also known as the Treaty on the Economic Community of Sovereign States). According to the text, even before the disintegration of the Soviet Union, regardless of declarations of independence of the separate Union Republics and regardless of the fate of the Soviet Union, an economic community is being created by independent states in order to form a single market and conduct a coordinated economic policy as an essential condition for overcoming the crisis, preserving a single currency and free movement of goods and services. The treaty was signed by the heads of Armenia, Belarus, Kazakhstan, Kyrgyzstan, Russia, Tajikistan, Turkmenistan, Uzbekistan and the president of the Union of Soviet Socialist Republics Mikhail Gorbachev, but was not ratified and implemented.

According to the Treaty, the IEC became the supreme union executive body and was renamed the Interstate Economic Committee. On 19 December the Committee for Operational Management of the National Economy and the Interstate Economic Committee were dissolved by a presidential Russian SFSR decree.

=== Belovezha Accords ===
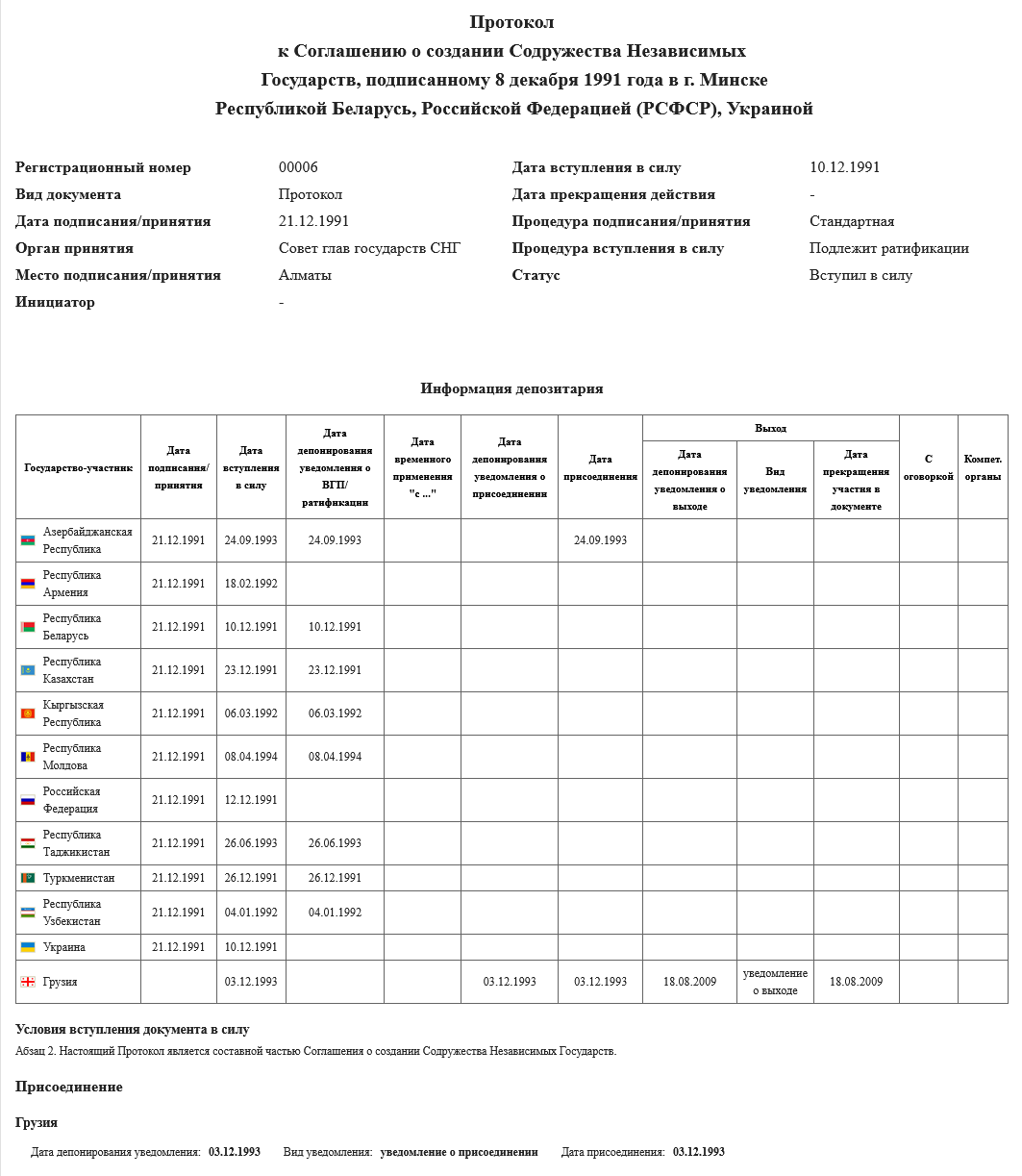
The Protocol to the Agreement on the Creation of the Commonwealth of Independent States dated 21 December 1991. The information from the depository of the international agreement published on the Unified Register of Legal Acts and Other Documents of the Commonwealth of Independent States (under the executive committee of the Commonwealth of Independent States) as of 2024.

The Commonwealth of Independent States (CIS) was founded by an Agreement on the creation the Commonwealth of Independent States (Соглашение о создании Содружества Независимых Государств) signed on 8 December 1991 by Russia, Belarus and Ukraine. According to Article 7, the High Contracting Parties indicate that through common coordinating institutions, their joint activities will consist in coordinating foreign policy activities, cooperation in the formation and development of a common economic space, common European and Eurasian markets, in the field of customs policy, in the field of customs policy, in the development of transport and communication systems, cooperation in the field of environmental protection, migration policy and the fight against organized crime. The heads of 5 Central Asian republics met in Ashgabat on 12-13 December. The inspirer of the Ashgabat statement, Nursultan Nazarbayev, informed his colleagues about the meeting with Yeltsin, during which the Russian president said that the creation of the commonwealth was not an accomplished fact, but only a proposal sent to the republics for consideration. Further prospects of the inter-republican commonwealth will be discussed on 21 December in Alma-Ata, where Nursultan Nazarbayev invited the leaders of all 12 republics. 5 republics confirmed that the integration of the former Soviet republics has come to an impasse, and stated that all five are ready to become equal co-founders of the Commonwealth, they called for special attention to economic cooperation, as well as the previously concluded Treaty on the Economic Community (On 18 October 1991), which is necessary to confirm and finalize. Nazarbayev later recalled that the heads of state were satisfied with "Ukraine's return to the integration process". In Alma-Ata, on 21 December, 11 Republics became co-founders of the Commonwealth. In 2019, CIS Executive Secretary Sergei Lebedev recalled that it was in Ashgabat on 13 December 1991 that the historic meeting of the leaders of Turkmenistan, Kazakhstan, Kyrgyzstan, Tajikistan and Uzbekistan took place, which prepared the conditions for signing the Alma-Ata Declaration, which became the basis for the formation of the CIS in its current form.

At a press conference in Almaty on 21 December 1991, Leonid Kravchuk answered the journalist's question “Question to all (heads of state). Why did you refuse the name Commonwealth of Euro-Asian and Independent States?” as follows: “The fact is that the beginning of the Commonwealth and the foundation of the Commonwealth was laid in Minsk and the corresponding name was given to the Commonwealth there. After that three states - Belarus, Russia, Ukraine - have already ratified these documents. Therefore, it would be unreasonable to change the name both legally and politically.” Nursultan Nazarbayev immediately added: “But in the Declaration, which you will read tomorrow, the economic area is called Eurasian.”

The Soviet Union officially self-dissolved on 26 December 1991, and this date is considered the date of the final recognition of independence by the Soviet Union. The Commonwealth countries agreed to cancel price limits in a coordinated manner and switch to market prices on 2 January 1992.

== Commonwealth of Independent States ==
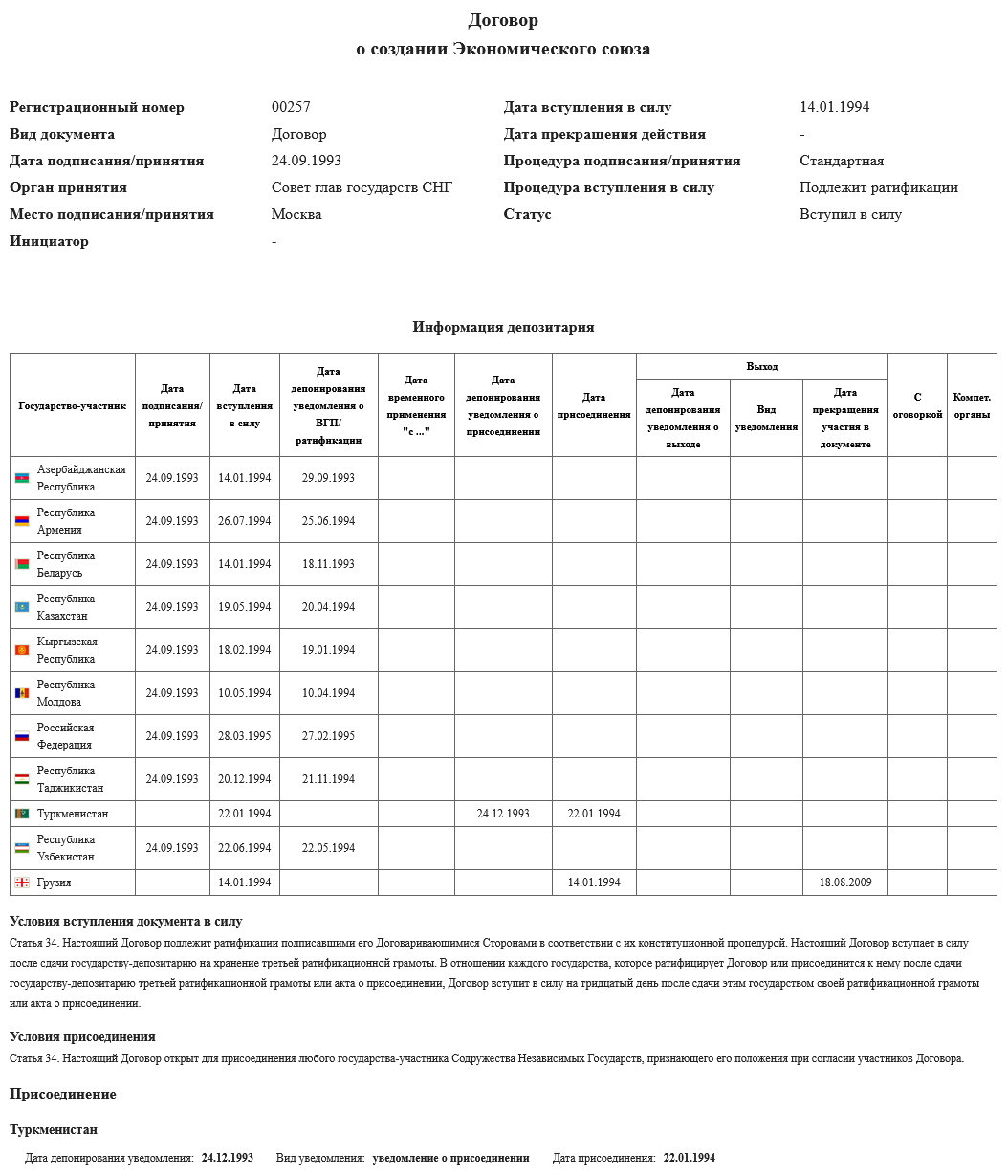
The Treaty on the Creation of the Economic Union dated 24 September 1993. The information from the depository of the international agreement published on the Unified Register of Legal Acts and Other Documents of the Commonwealth of Independent States (under the executive committee of the Commonwealth of Independent States) as of 2024.

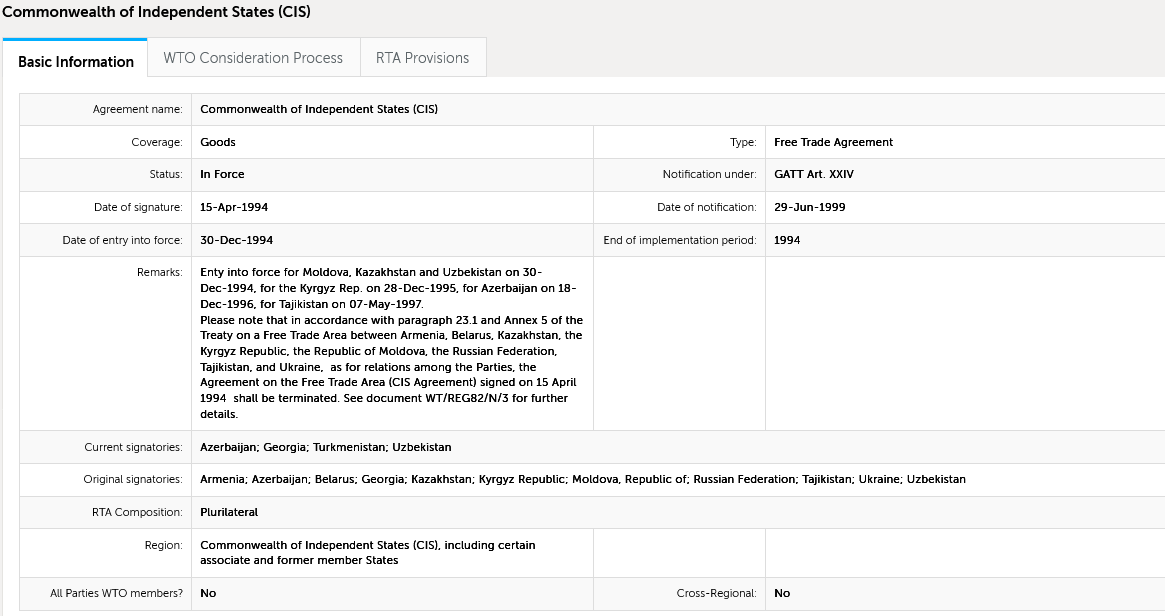
Regional Trade Agreements Database of the World Trade Organization.

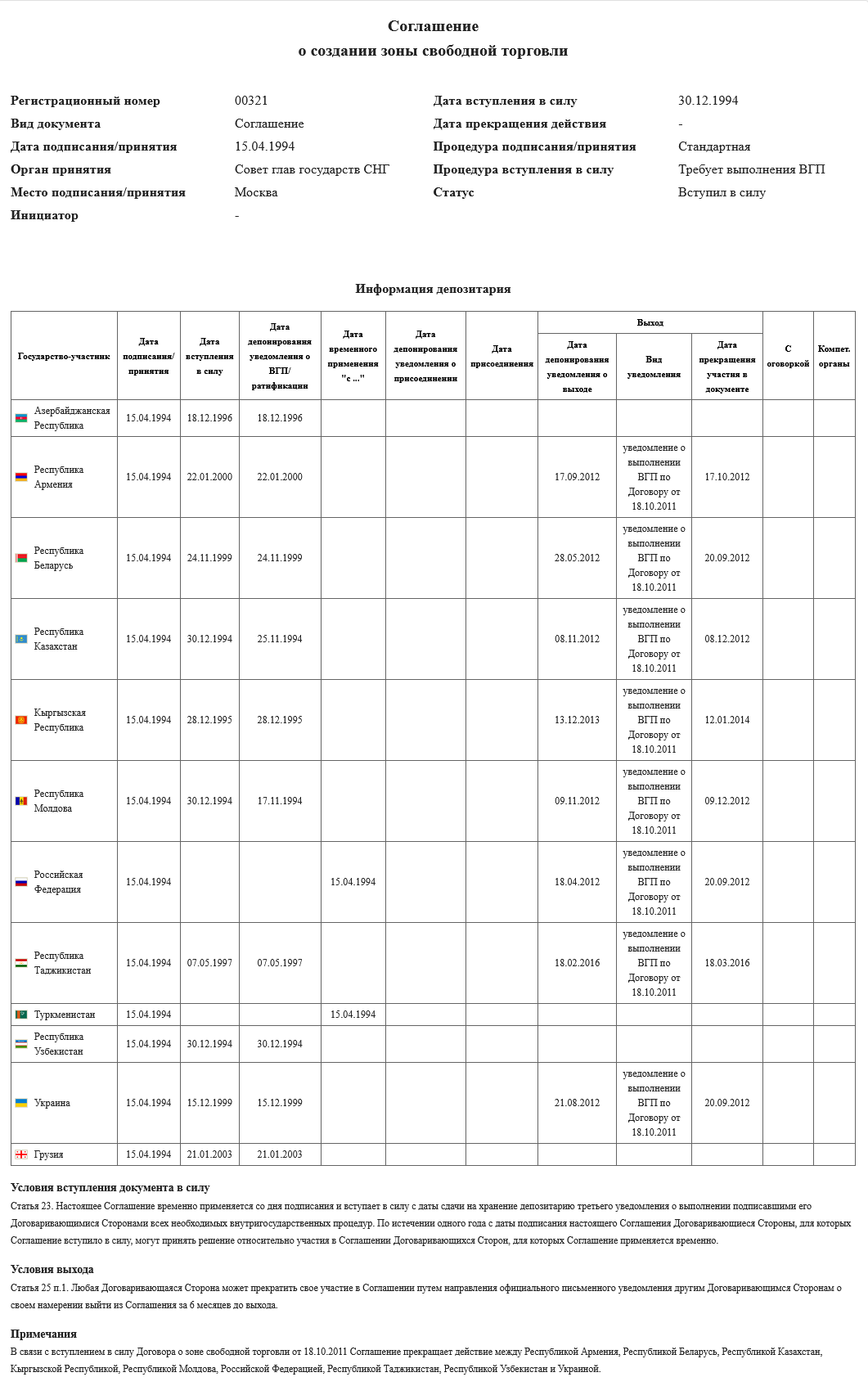
The Agreement on the Creation of Free Trade Area dated 15 April 1994. The information from the depository of the international agreement published on the Unified Register of Legal Acts and Other Documents of the Commonwealth of Independent States (under the executive committee of the Commonwealth of Independent States) as of 2024.

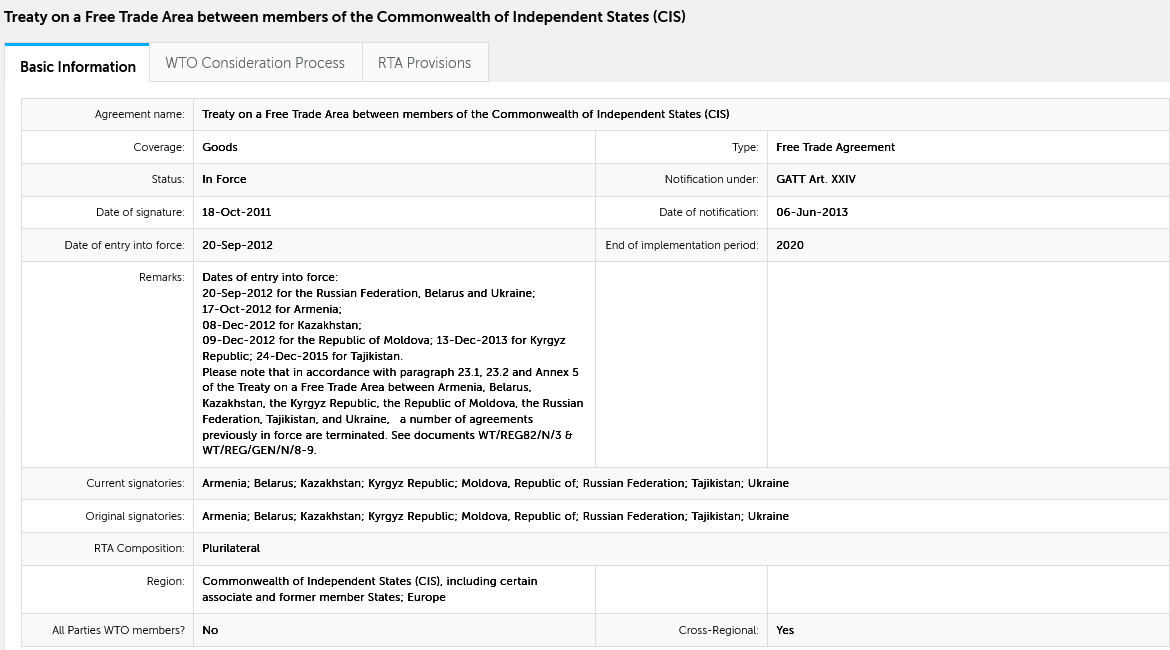
Regional Trade Agreements Database of the World Trade Organization.

=== 1992 Council for Standardization, Metrology and Certification ===
On 13 March 1992, Armenia, Belarus, Kazakhstan, Kyrgyzstan, Moldova, Russia, Tajikistan, Turkmenistan, Uzbekistan and Ukraine signed an Agreement on the Coordinated Policy in the Field of Standardization, Metrology and Certification, which entered into force for all these countries. Georgia's accession entered into force on 22 May 1995. Azerbaijan's accession entered into force on 31 May 1995. Ukraine withdrew on 2 June 2023. Moldova withdrew on 4 September 2024. The Euro-Asian Council for Standardization, Metrology, and Certification (EASC) was created by this Agreement. Whereas in the past GOST meant "state standard", now GOST has come to mean "interstate standard". GOST standards were originally developed by the government of the Soviet Union as part of its national standardization strategy. After the disintegration of the USSR, the GOST standards acquired a new status of the regional standards. They are now administered by the Euro-Asian Council for Standardization, Metrology and Certification (EASC), a standards organization chartered by the Commonwealth of Independent States. The International Organization for Standardization recognized the Council as a Regional Organization for Standardization in 1996. On 7 June 2013, the EASC and the Eurasian Economic Commission signed a memorandum on the harmonization of standards so that standards within the Commonwealth of Independent States and the Eurasian Economic Union do not conflict. In practice, thanks to the activities of the UN Economic Commission for Europe, the International Telecommunication Union, the International Electrotechnical Commission and the International Organization for Standardization (the three official languages of ISO are English, French and Russian), many technical standards used, for example, in the European Union and in the CIS countries are the same or very similar (for example, "Soviet" plugs and sockets are virtually identical to the standards in western Europe). In particular, in 2014 in order to switch from 220 volts to 230 volts in electrical power lines, Armenia, Belarus, Kazakhstan, Kyrgyzstan, Moldova, Russia and Ukraine voted to adopt the interstate standard GOST 29322-2014.

=== 1993 Interstate Bank ===
The Agreement on Establishment of the Interstate Bank was signed on 22 January 1993 by Armenia, Belarus, Kazakhstan, Kyrgyzstan, Moldova, Russia, Tajikistan, Turkmenistan, Uzbekistan, Ukraine and ratified by all countries except Ukraine, which revoked its signature in 1997. In particular, the Interstate Bank is serving as the Secretariat of the Eurasian Council of Central (National) Banks, coordinating the exchange of information on the most relevant economic and financial issues, including the development of national banking systems of the Commonwealth, the organization of banking supervision, the state of balance of payments and foreign exchange markets and macroeconomic development of the countries of the Commonwealth of Independent States and the Eurasian Economic Union.

=== 1993 Euroasian Coal and Metal Community ===
On 24 September 1993, Armenia, Azerbaijan, Belarus, Kazakhstan, Kyrgyzstan, Moldova, Russia, Tajikistan, Uzbekistan, Ukraine and Georgia signed the Agreement on the Creation of the interstate Euroasian Coal and Metal Community, which entered into force in 1995 for Kazakhstan, Moldova, Russia, Tajikistan, Uzbekistan, and in 1996 entered into force for Belarus, Kyrgyzstan and Ukraine. On 12 January 1994, the Kommersant newspaper wrote that “for the first time since the dissolution of the Soviet Union, representatives of economic sectors have managed to create a supra-governmental body that has not only recommendatory functions, but also has the ability to solve most of the production issues of metallurgical and coal enterprises” and the authority of the Euroasian Community of Coal and Metal is mandatory for the governing bodies of the participating countries, rather than recommendations. Protocol on termination of the Agreement on Creation of the Interstate Euroasian Coal and Metal Community was signed on 19 September, 2003. On the same day Russia, Belarus, Kazakhstan and Ukraine signed the Common Economic Zone Agreement. Euroasian Coal and Metal Community was terminated on 29 September 2004.

=== 1993 Treaty on Economic Union and Interstate Economic Committee ===
On 24 September 1993, at a meeting of the Commonwealth of Independent States (CIS) Council of Heads of State in Moscow, Azerbaijan, Armenia, Belarus, Kazakhstan, Kyrgyzstan, Moldova, Russia, Tajikistan, Uzbekistan signed the Treaty on the creation of an Economic Union which reinforces by an international agreement the intention to create an economic union through the step-by-step creation of a free trade area, a customs union and conditions for the free movement of goods, services, capital and labor. All these countries have ratified the Treaty and it entered into force on January 14, 1994. Turkmenistan and Georgia joined in 1994 and ratified the Treaty, but Georgia withdrew in 2009. A number of other documents and agreements were adopted for the development of the economic union. For example, on 21 October 1994, an Agreement on the creation of a Payment Union of States was signed and the Main directions of integration development and a perspective plan for integration development were adopted. The purpose of the union is to form common economic space grounded on free movement of goods, services, labour force, capital; to elaborate coordinated monetary, tax, price, customs, external economic policy; to bring together methods of regulating economic activity and create favourable conditions for the development of direct production relations.

As a permanent functioning coordinating and executive body of the Economic Union, the Interstate Economic Committee has been established.

=== 1994 Framework for Bilateral Free Trade Agreements and Freedom of Transit ===
On 15 April 1994, at a meeting of the Commonwealth of Independent States (CIS) Council of Heads of State in Moscow, all 12 post-Soviet states signed the international Agreement on the Establishment of a Free Trade Area in order to move towards the creation of an economic union. Article 17 also confirmed the intention to conclude a free trade agreement in services. Article 1 indicated that this was "the first stage of the creation of the Economic Union", but in 1999 the countries agreed to remove this phrase from the agreement. On the same day, 15 April 1994, the "Agreement on Ukraine's accession to the Economic Union as an associate member" was signed by Azerbaijan, Armenia, Belarus, Kazakhstan, Kyrgyzstan, Moldova, Russia, Tajikistan, Turkmenistan, Uzbekistan, Ukraine and Georgia but never entered into force due to non-ratification by Russia, Ukraine, Turkmenistan and Georgia, although all the others ratified.

On 29 March 1994, President of Kazakhstan Nursultan Nazarbayev complained that the CIS was inadequate and did not provide the integration that the countries badly needed. He proposed the creation of a Eurasian Union of States as a new organization completely separate from the CIS. For the first time it was suggested to use the name “Eurasian” for an economic union rather than “Euro-Asian” or “Euroasian”. The Eurasian Economic Union traces its history back to Nazarbayev's proposal.

=== 1994 Eurasian Patent System ===
The Eurasian Patent Convention was signed on 9 September 1994 by Azerbaijan, Armenia, Belarus, Kazakhstan, Kyrgyzstan, Moldova, Russia, Tajikistan, Uzbekistan, Ukraine and Georgia. It created both the Eurasian Patent Organization (EAPO) and the legal system pursuant to which Eurasian patents are granted.

=== 1995 Customs Union ===
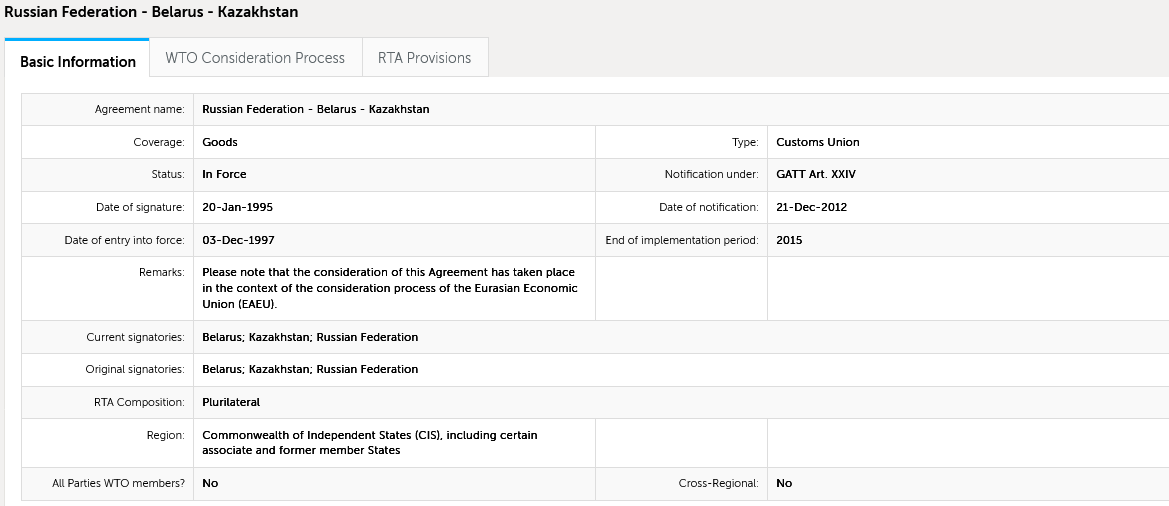
Regional Trade Agreements Database of the World Trade Organization.

In order to implement the Treaty on the Creation of the Economic Union, on 6 January 1995 Russia and Belarus concluded an Agreement on a bilateral Customs Union (which is still in force as of 2024 and is part of the database of international treaties of the Eurasian Economic Union). On 26 May 1995, Belarusian President Alexander Lukashenko and Russian Prime Minister Viktor Chernomyrdin dismantled the border post at the Belarus-Russia border. After that, customs and border controls were abolished. The Customs Union between Russia and Belarus entered into force on 30 November 1995. Kazakhstan signed the accession on 20 January 1995 and the customs union entered into force for Kazakhstan on 3 December 1997. However, a customs union without a common external tariff is not a real customs union, so the full-scale launch of the customs union took place only on 1 January 2010. A 2004 International Monetary Fund publication noted that it was not a customs union (which requires a common external tariff) but a free trade area (as of 2004).

=== 1997 Investor Rights Convention ===
The CIS Investor Rights Convention was signed on 28 March 1997 and entered into force on 21 January 1999. As of 2025, it is in force for Armenia, Belarus, Kazakhstan, Kyrgyzstan, Moldova and Tajikistan.

=== 1999 Protocol introducing a multilateral free trade among ten countries ===
On 2 April 1999, in Moscow, the presidents of 11 countries, namely Armenia, Azerbaijan, Belarus, Georgia, Kazakhstan, Kyrgyzstan, Moldova, Russia, Tajikistan, Uzbekistan and Ukraine signed a Protocol on Amendments and Additions to the Agreement on the Establishment of a Free Trade Area of 15 April 1994 (Протокол о внесении изменений и дополнений в Соглашение о создании зоны свободной торговли от 15 апреля 1994 года). Turkmenistan did not participate. The Protocol entered into force on 24 November 1999 for those countries that had completed ratification. As of 2023, the Protocol has entered into force for all countries, namely Armenia, Azerbaijan, Belarus, Georgia, Kazakhstan, Kyrgyzstan, Moldova, Tajikistan, Uzbekistan and Ukraine, except Russia, which remains a signatory but has not notified entry into force or provisional application. According to the executive committee of the Commonwealth of Independent States, no one has ceased participation in the Protocol or suspended the application, while 1 reservation was made by Azerbaijan on non-application in relation to Armenia and 2 specific opinions were expressed by Georgia and Ukraine.

In 2007, a scientific article evaluated the legal framework for free trade in the post-Soviet space as a particular blend of 'à la carte multilateralism' and multiple bilateralism. "Both the bilateral and the multilateral regimes have undergone significant (often underestimated) development, and that the multilateral regime has generally sought to be more ambitious both in its substantive and institutional reach. Yet, both regimes can be described as ultimately weak and their overlap confusing. While a higher juridicization and comprehensive consolidation at the multilateral level of the CIS free trade regime may be recommended." it said.

=== 2011 multilateral Free Trade Area Treaty among 9 countries ===
In October 2011, the new Commonwealth of Independent States Treaty on Free Trade Area was signed by eight of the eleven CIS prime ministers; Armenia, Belarus, Kazakhstan, Kyrgyzstan, Moldova, Russia, Tajikistan, and Ukraine at a meeting in St. Petersburg.

=== 2023 Agreement on Free Trade in Services among 7 countries ===
After 11 years of negotiations, on 8 June 2023, in Sochi, Armenia, Belarus, Kazakhstan, Kyrgyzstan, Russia, Tajikistan and Uzbekistan signed the Commonwealth of Independent States Agreement on Free Trade in Services, Establishment, Operations and Investment to partly integrate Uzbekistan and Tajikistan on the common standards of the WTO (General Agreement on Trade in Services) and the EAEU (some provisions were borrowed from EAEU law) even without their membership in the WTO (Uzbekistan) or the EAEU (Uzbekistan and Tajikistan). The Treaty on the Eurasian Economic Union has preserved international agreements on trade in services in the sphere of national competence of the member states therefore, the EAEU is not a party to the agreement.

The Information and Analytical Department of the CIS Executive Committee notes in October 2023 that at the moment a kind of pyramid of integration entities has developed in the CIS countries, differing in the depth of economic integration (multi-speed integration), and the implementation of free trade agreements and a number of other documents will lead to the formation of a full-fledged common economic space within the Commonwealth. Within its participant countries, state borders will cease to be an obstacle to the free movement of goods, services, labor and capital. At the moment, there is a simplification of the movement of labor in the CIS countries (see Mobility rights arrangements of the Commonwealth of Independent States), but complete freedom of movement without a work permit exists only in the EAEU.

=== Common labor market ===
At the meeting of the CIS Council of Heads of Government held in Minsk on 28 May 2021, an agreement on cooperation in the field of promoting employment of the population of the CIS member states was signed. It is the first ever multilateral international treaty of the CIS participant states in the field of employment. The document was developed by the Advisory Council on Labor, Employment and Social Protection of the Population of the CIS participating states in accordance with the Priority Measures for the formation of a common labor market and regulation of labor migration for 2017–2020. The agreement entered into force in 2022. On 30 May 2024 at the Commonwealth Headquarters Representatives of the CIS countries discussed cooperation on the creation of a common labor market.

On 6 March 2024, representatives of Armenia, Belarus, Kazakhstan, Kyrgyzstan, Russia, Tajikistan, Uzbekistan and the CIS Executive Committee finalized the work on updating the Concept of Phased Formation of a Common Labor Market and Regulation of Labor Force Migration. On 29 November 2024, the CIS finally adopted an updated Concept for the phased formation of a common labor market and migration regulation.

== See also ==
- Regional organizations in the Post-Soviet states
- European integration
- Middle East economic integration
