= Eurasian economic integration =

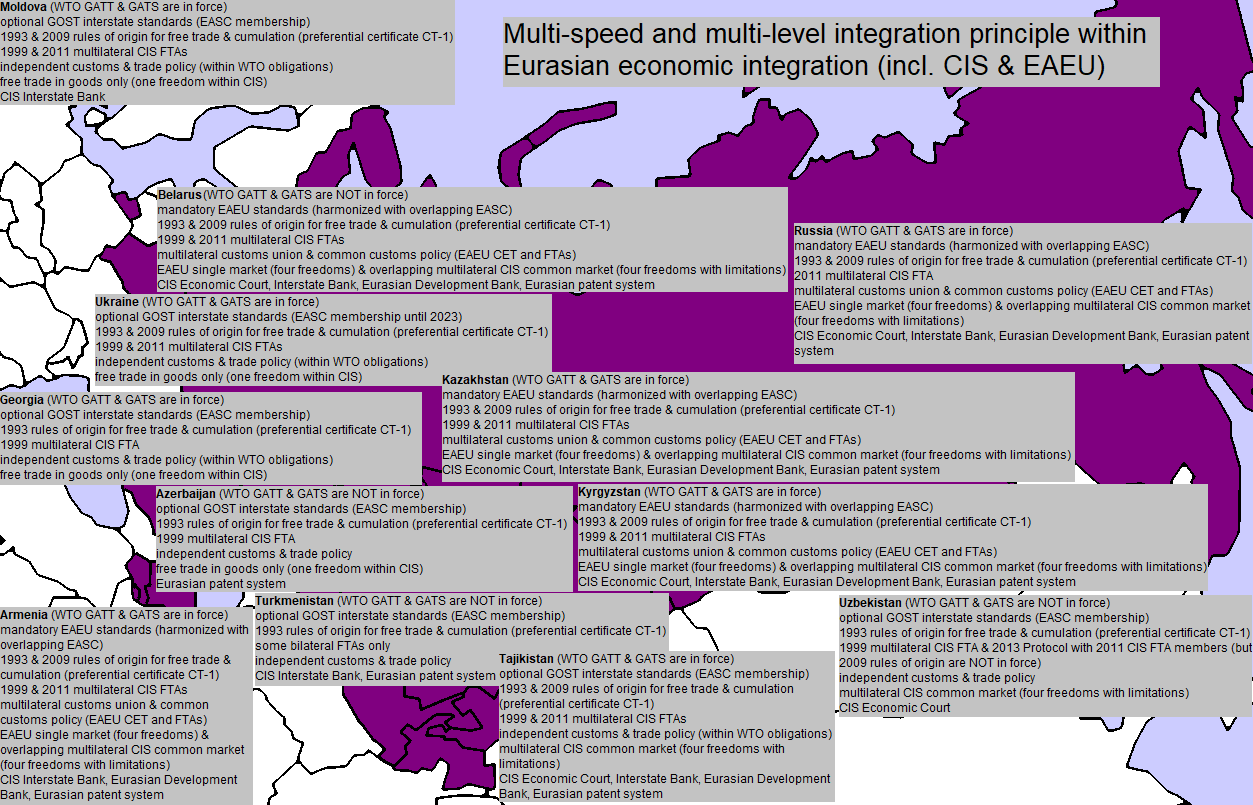
Participation in agreements and stages of economic integration of post-Soviet states within the common market of CIS and EAEU. The principles of voluntary step-by-step multi-speed and multi-level integration are envisaged in the adopted multilateral documents.

Eurasian economic integration is the process of economic integration of post-Soviet states which are geographically located in the center of the continent of Eurasia. Eurasian integration has been taking shape since 1991, originally via the establishment of the Commonwealth of Independent States in 1991, as noted in the World Trade Organization report. Currently, integration is primarily implemented through organizations that are open to accession by any post-Soviet countries, such as the Commonwealth of Independent States and the Eurasian Economic Union. An economic union means the deepest stage of economic integration.

The former Soviet republics that became independent states were part of the economy of the Soviet Union with its common technical standards, common infrastructure, territorial proximity, chains of cooperation, and common legal heritage. Through the signing of international agreements on trade, economic cooperation and integration, countries can achieve an increase in the efficiency of their economies, which suffered due to the disintegration of the Soviet Union. At the same time, all post-Soviet countries have moved to a market economy, implemented reforms and expanded trade and cooperation with the global economy. Over the past three decades, several negotiations have taken place and not all proposed integration projects have been successful.

== History ==
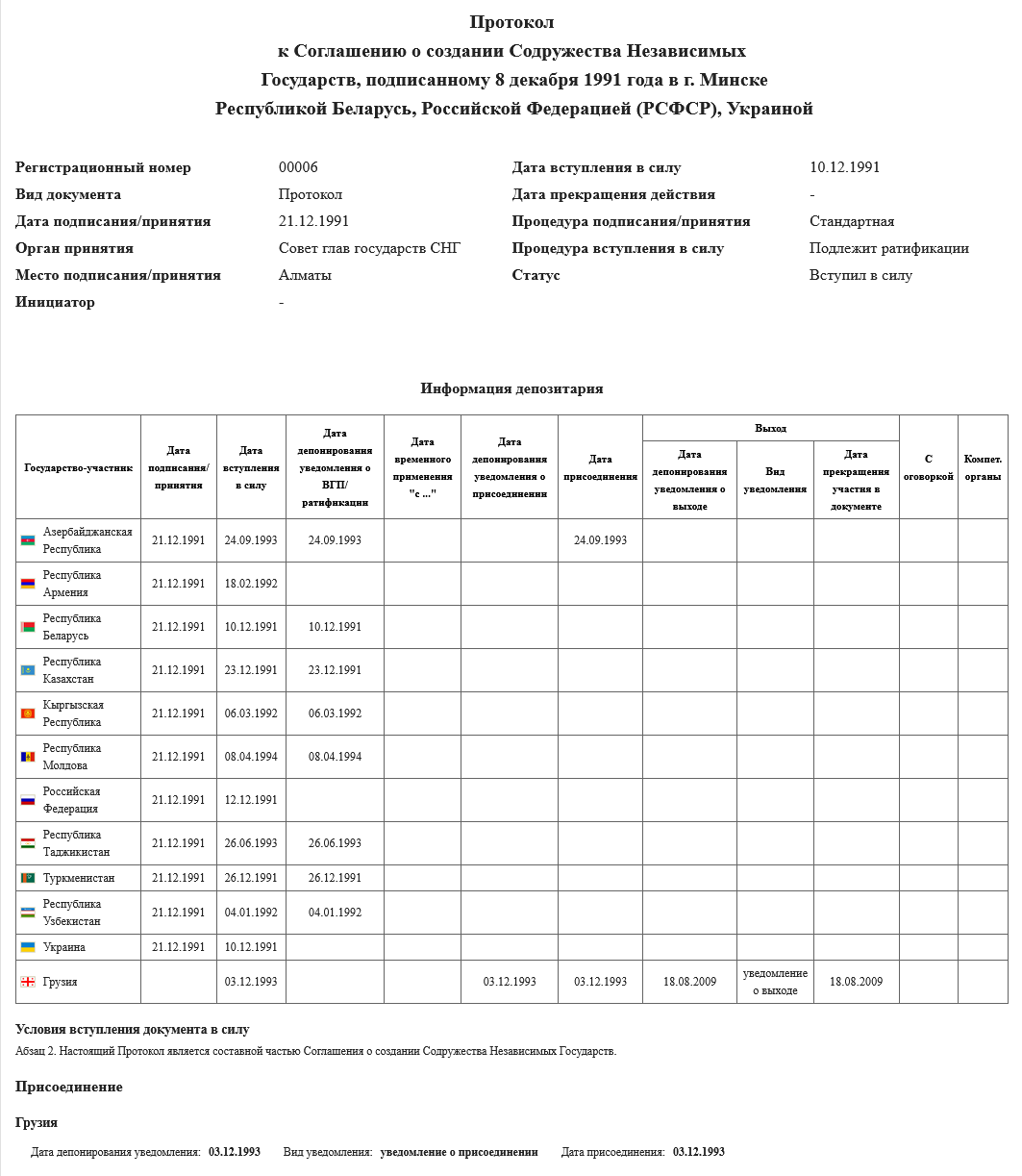
The Protocol to the Agreement on the Creation of the Commonwealth of Independent States dated 21 December 1991. The information from the depository of the international agreement published on the Unified Register of Legal Acts and Other Documents of the Commonwealth of Independent States (under the executive committee of the Commonwealth of Independent States) as of 2024.

In 1989, the European-Asian Union was proposed by the co-chairman of the Interregional Deputy Group Andrei Sakharov and with the participation of members of the group Galina Starovoitova, Anatoly Sobchak and others. Sakharov presented Gorbachev with his draft Constitution of the Union of Soviet Republics of Europe and Asia on 27 November 1989.

The New Union Treaty was a draft treaty that would have replaced the 1922 Treaty on the Creation of the USSR to salvage and reform the Soviet Union as a renewed federation. A ceremony of the signing the treaty was scheduled for 20 August 1991, but was prevented by the August Coup a day earlier. By September 1991, support for continuing the Soviet system had transitioned into reforming the Soviet Union into a confederation (not a federation) of sovereign states. However, this also did not succeed.

On 18 October 1991, in the St. George Hall of the Grand Kremlin Palace Mikhail Gorbachev and the leaders of eight Union republics (excluding Ukraine, Moldova, Georgia and Azerbaijan) signed the Treaty on the Economic Community. According to the text, even before the disintegration of the Soviet Union and regardless of the fate of the Soviet Union, an economic community is being created by independent states in order to form a single market and conduct a coordinated economic policy as an essential condition for overcoming the crisis, preserving a single currency and free movement of goods and services. The treaty was signed by the heads of Armenia, Belarus, Kazakhstan, Kyrgyzstan, Russia, Tajikistan, Turkmenistan, Uzbekistan and the president of the Union of Soviet Socialist Republics Mikhail Gorbachev, but was not ratified and implemented.

The Commonwealth of Independent States (CIS) was founded by an Agreement on the creation the Commonwealth of Independent States (Соглашение о создании Содружества Независимых Государств) signed on 8 December 1991 by Russia, Belarus and Ukraine. According to Article 7, the High Contracting Parties indicate that through common coordinating institutions, their joint activities will consist in coordinating foreign policy activities, cooperation in the formation and development of a common economic space, common European and Eurasian markets, in the field of customs policy, in the field of customs policy, in the development of transport and communication systems, cooperation in the field of environmental protection, migration policy and the fight against organized crime. The heads of 5 Central Asian republics met in Ashgabat on 12-13 December. The inspirer of the Ashgabat statement, Nursultan Nazarbayev, informed his colleagues about the meeting with Yeltsin, during which the Russian president said that the creation of the commonwealth was not an accomplished fact, but only a proposal sent to the republics for consideration. Further prospects of the inter-republican commonwealth will be discussed on 21 December in Alma-Ata, where Nursultan Nazarbayev invited the leaders of all 12 republics. 5 republics confirmed that the integration of the former Soviet republics has come to an impasse, and stated that all five are ready to become equal co-founders of the Commonwealth, they called for special attention to economic cooperation, as well as the previously concluded Treaty on the Economic Community (On 18 October 1991), which is necessary to confirm and finalize. Nazarbayev later recalled that the heads of state were satisfied with "Ukraine's return to the integration process". In Alma-Ata, on 21 December, 11 Republics became co-founders of the Commonwealth. In 2019, CIS Executive Secretary Sergei Lebedev recalled that it was in Ashgabat on 13 December 1991 that the historic meeting of the leaders of Turkmenistan, Kazakhstan, Kyrgyzstan, Tajikistan and Uzbekistan took place, which prepared the conditions for signing the Alma-Ata Declaration, which became the basis for the formation of the CIS in its current form.

At a press conference in Almaty on 21 December 1991, Leonid Kravchuk answered the journalist's question “Question to all (heads of state). Why did you refuse the name Commonwealth of Euro-Asian and Independent States?” as follows: “The fact is that the beginning of the Commonwealth and the foundation of the Commonwealth was laid in Minsk and the corresponding name was given to the Commonwealth there. After that three states - Belarus, Russia, Ukraine - have already ratified these documents. Therefore, it would be unreasonable to change the name both legally and politically.” Nursultan Nazarbayev immediately added: “But in the Declaration, which you will read tomorrow, the economic area is called Eurasian.”

The Soviet Union officially self-dissolved on 26 December 1991, and this date is considered the date of the final recognition of independence by the Soviet Union. The Commonwealth countries agreed to cancel price limits in a coordinated manner and switch to market prices on 2 January 1992.

== Commonwealth of Independent States ==
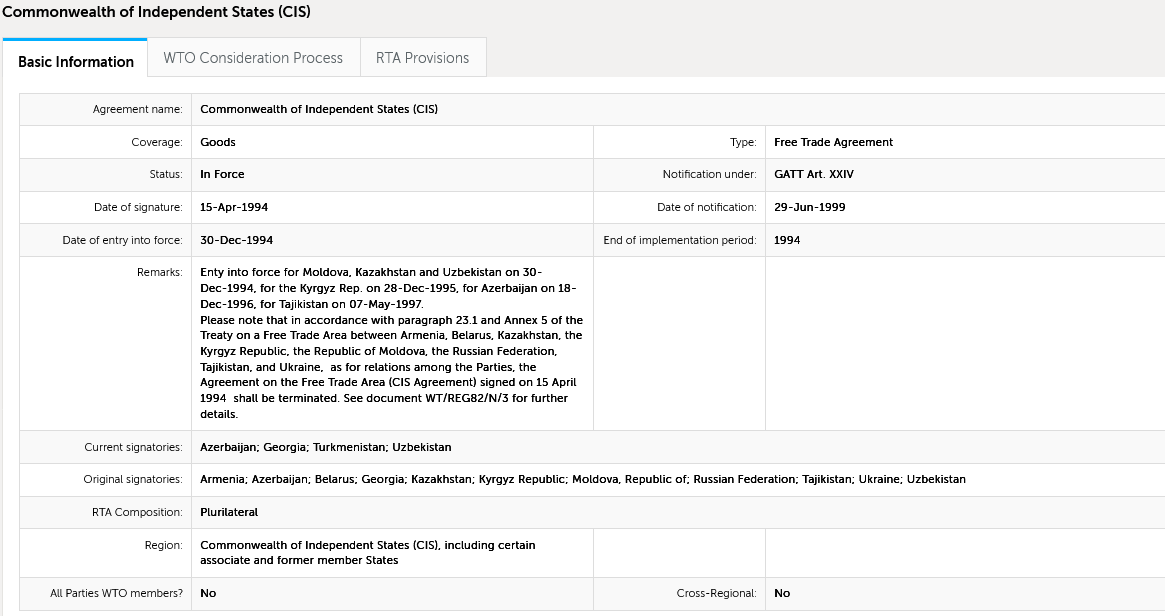
Regional Trade Agreements Database of the World Trade Organization.

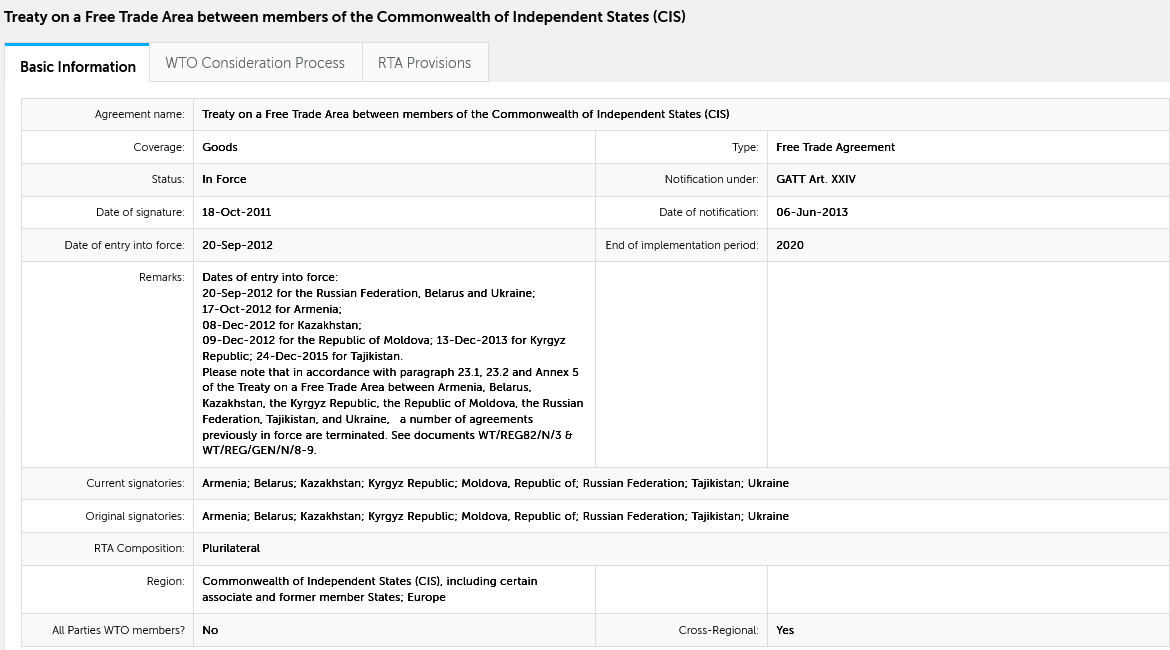
Regional Trade Agreements Database of the World Trade Organization.

On 24 September 1993, at a meeting of the Commonwealth of Independent States (CIS) Council of Heads of State in Moscow, Azerbaijan, Armenia, Belarus, Kazakhstan, Kyrgyzstan, Moldova, Russia, Tajikistan, Uzbekistan signed the Treaty on the creation of an Economic Union which reinforces by an international agreement the intention to create an economic union through the step-by-step creation of a free trade area, a customs union and conditions for the free movement of goods, services, capital and labor. All these countries have ratified the Treaty and it entered into force on January 14, 1994. Turkmenistan and Georgia joined in 1994 and ratified the Treaty, but Georgia withdrew in 2009. A number of other documents and agreements were adopted for the development of the economic union. For example, on 21 October 1994, an Agreement on the creation of a Payment Union of States was signed and the Main directions of integration development and a perspective plan for integration development were adopted.

On 15 April 1994, at a meeting of the Commonwealth of Independent States (CIS) Council of Heads of State in Moscow, all 12 post-Soviet states signed the international Agreement on the Establishment of a Free Trade Area in order to move towards the creation of an economic union. Article 17 also confirmed the intention to conclude a free trade agreement in services. Article 1 indicated that this was "the first stage of the creation of the Economic Union", but in 1999 the countries agreed to remove this phrase from the agreement. On the same day, 15 April 1994, the "Agreement on Ukraine's accession to the Economic Union as an associate member" was signed Azerbaijan, Armenia, Belarus, Kazakhstan, Kyrgyzstan, Moldova, Russia, Tajikistan, Turkmenistan, Uzbekistan, Ukraine and Georgia but never entered into force due to non-ratification by Russia, Ukraine, Turkmenistan and Georgia, although all the others ratified.

On 2 April 1999, in Moscow, the presidents of 11 countries, namely Armenia, Azerbaijan, Belarus, Georgia, Kazakhstan, Kyrgyzstan, Moldova, Russia, Tajikistan, Uzbekistan and Ukraine signed a Protocol on Amendments and Additions to the Agreement on the Establishment of a Free Trade Area of 15 April 1994 (Протокол о внесении изменений и дополнений в Соглашение о создании зоны свободной торговли от 15 апреля 1994 года). Turkmenistan did not participate. The Protocol entered into force on 24 November 1999 for those countries that had completed ratification. As of 2023, the Protocol has entered into force for all countries, namely Armenia, Azerbaijan, Belarus, Georgia, Kazakhstan, Kyrgyzstan, Moldova, Tajikistan, Uzbekistan and Ukraine, except Russia, which remains a signatory but has not notified entry into force or provisional application. According to the executive committee of the Commonwealth of Independent States, no one has ceased participation in the Protocol or suspended the application, while 1 reservation was made by Azerbaijan on non-application in relation to Armenia and 2 specific opinions were expressed by Georgia and Ukraine.

In 2007, a scientific article evaluated the legal framework for free trade in the post-Soviet space as a particular blend of 'à la carte multilateralism' and multiple bilateralism. "Both the bilateral and the multilateral regimes have undergone significant (often underestimated) development, and that the multilateral regime has generally sought to be more ambitious both in its substantive and institutional reach. Yet, both regimes can be described as ultimately weak and their overlap confusing. While a higher juridicization and comprehensive consolidation at the multilateral level of the CIS free trade regime may be recommended." it said.

In October 2011, the new Commonwealth of Independent States Treaty on Free Trade Area was signed by eight of the eleven CIS prime ministers; Armenia, Belarus, Kazakhstan, Kyrgyzstan, Moldova, Russia, Tajikistan, and Ukraine at a meeting in St. Petersburg.

After 11 years of negotiations, on 8 June 2023, in Sochi, Armenia, Belarus, Kazakhstan, Kyrgyzstan, Russia, Tajikistan and Uzbekistan signed the Commonwealth of Independent States Agreement on Free Trade in Services, Establishment, Operations and Investment to partly integrate Uzbekistan and Tajikistan on the common standards of the WTO (General Agreement on Trade in Services) and the EAEU (some provisions were borrowed from EAEU law) even without their membership in the WTO (Uzbekistan) or the EAEU (Uzbekistan and Tajikistan). The Treaty on the Eurasian Economic Union has preserved international agreements on trade in services in the sphere of national competence of the member states therefore, the EAEU is not a party to the agreement.

The Information and Analytical Department of the CIS Executive Committee notes in October 2023 that at the moment a kind of pyramid of integration entities has developed in the CIS countries, differing in the depth of economic integration (multi-speed integration), and the implementation of free trade agreements and a number of other documents will lead to the formation of a full-fledged common economic space within the Commonwealth. Within its participant countries, state borders will cease to be an obstacle to the free movement of goods, services, labor and capital. At the moment, there is a simplification of the movement of labor in the CIS countries (see Mobility rights arrangements of the Commonwealth of Independent States), but complete freedom of movement without a work permit exists only in the EAEU.

== Common Economic Zone Agreement ==
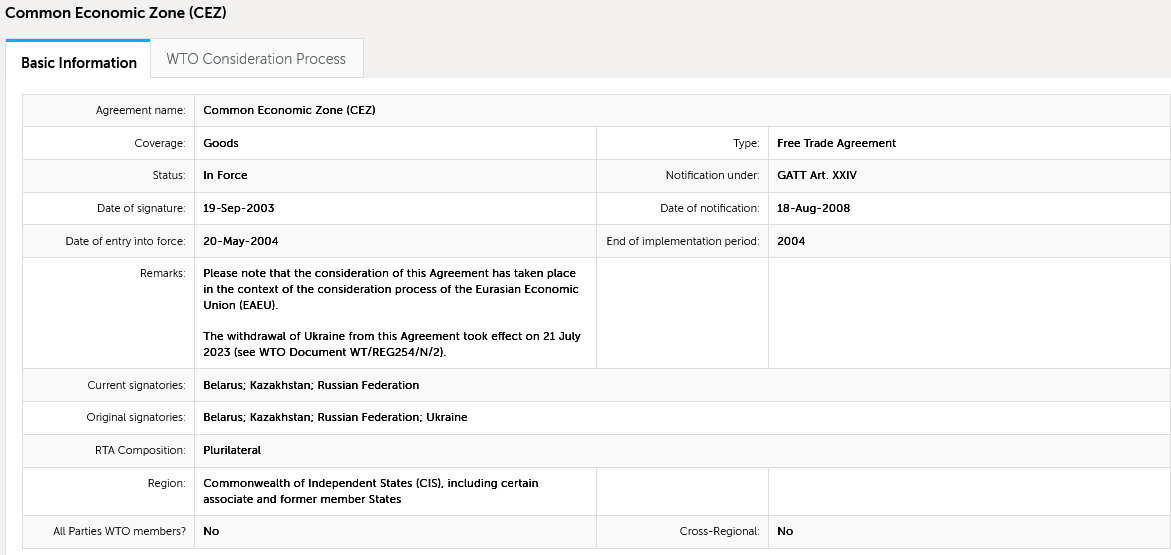
Regional Trade Agreements Database of the World Trade Organization.

The Single Economic Space Agreement (SES) or Common Economic Zone Agreement (CEZ) is an international agreement on the intention to create conditions for the free movement of goods, services, capital and labor (single market) without the creation of supranational bodies, signed on 19 September 2003 by Belarus, Kazakhstan, the Russian Federation and Ukraine. Initially this project was a separate one, but in June 2006, the implementation of this project was incorporated into the Eurasian Economic Community.

According to Regional Trade Agreements Database of the World Trade Organization, this agreement was signed on 19 September 2003, entered into force on 20 May 2004 and is "In Force" as of 2024. The withdrawal of Ukraine from this Agreement took effect on 21 July 2023 (see WTO Document WT/REG254/N/2). It was Ukraine that notified the World Trade Organization of its participation in the agreement on August 18, 2008.

== Eurasian Economic Community and Eurasian Economic Union ==
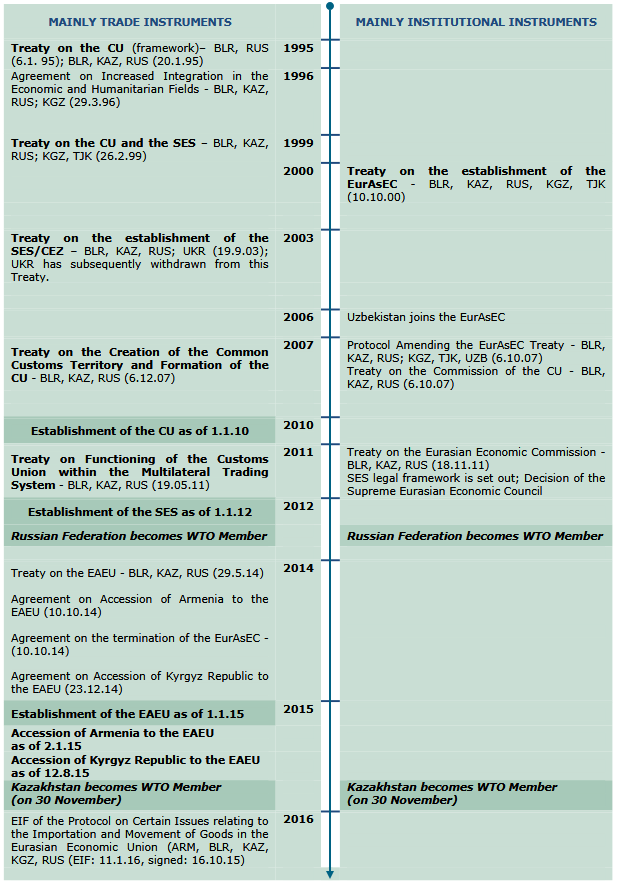
Timeline of EAEU Integration from the World Trade Organization report.

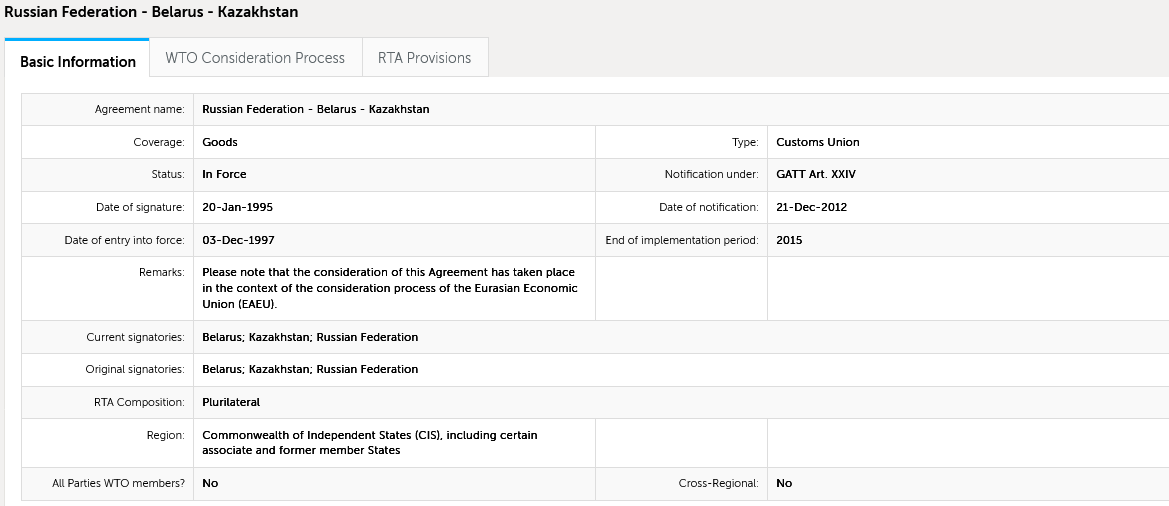
Regional Trade Agreements Database of the World Trade Organization.

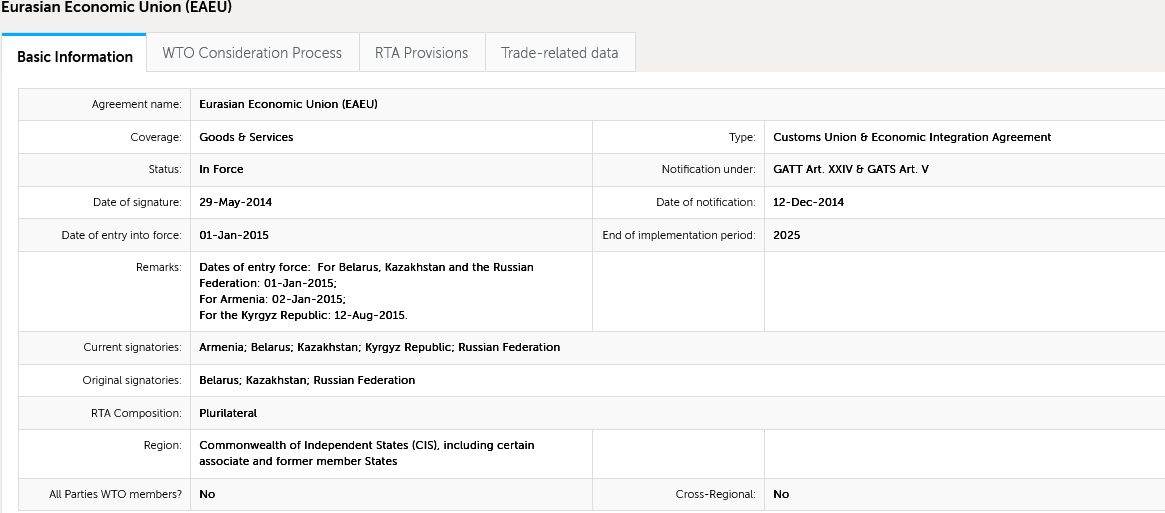
Regional Trade Agreements Database of the World Trade Organization.

Further and more deep integration took place outside the legal framework of the CIS. Pursuant to the Treaty on the creation of an Economic Union, the Agreement on the Customs Union between the Russian Federation and the Republic of Belarus was signed on January 6, 1995, in Minsk. The Government of the Republic of Belarus and the Government of the Russian Federation, on the one side, and the Government of the Republic of Kazakhstan, on the other side, signed an Agreement on the Customs Union in Moscow on January 20, 1995, in order to move towards the creation of an economic union as envisaged by the treaty. The implementation of 1995 agreements made it possible to launch the Customs Union of the Eurasian Economic Community in 2010. According to the database of international treaties of the Eurasian Economic Union, these agreements are still in force as of 2024 and apply in part not contrary to the Treaty on the Eurasian Economic Union.

The Eurasian Economic Community, founded in 2000, has assumed responsibility for the implementation of previous agreements, created supranational bodies and finally launched the long-delayed customs union in 2010.

The Customs Union and the Single Economic Space of the Eurasian Economic Union were inherited from the Eurasian Economic Community (terminated on January 1, 2015) and is now regulated by the Treaty on the Eurasian Economic Union (which entered into force on January 1, 2015), EAEU Customs Code, other international agreements and by decisions of supranational bodies as Supreme Eurasian Economic Council, Intergovernmental Council and Eurasian Economic Commission.

== Greater Eurasian Partnership ==
The Greater Eurasian Partnership is an initiative of Russian President Vladimir Putin, put forward in his address to the Federal Assembly in 2015 with the aim of forming a broad integration framework on the Eurasian continent, as indicated by the Russian Foreign Ministry.

== See also ==
- Regional organizations in the Post-Soviet states
- European integration
- Middle East economic integration
