= Transition period of the Soviet Union =

The transition period of the Soviet Union was declared by the adoption of the Law of the Soviet Union "On the bodies of state power and administration of the Union of Soviet Socialist Republics in the transition period", which was signed into law on 5 September 1991.

It was assumed that the Soviet Union would come out of the transition period with a new name after all treaties were signed and came into force. However, this did not happen.

== Background ==
In the 1980s, Mikhail Gorbachev's policies of Glasnost (openness) and Perestroika (restructuring) aimed to revitalize the Soviet system but instead accelerated its unraveling. Nationalist, democratic and liberal movements gained momentum across the Soviet republics, and the control of the Communist Party weakened.

In the Soviet Union, a Union Republic was a constituent federated political entity with a system of government called a Soviet republic, which was officially defined in the 1977 constitution as "a sovereign Soviet socialist state which has united with the other Soviet republics to form the Union of Soviet Socialist Republics" and whose sovereignty is limited by membership in the Union. As a result of its status as a sovereign state, the Union Republic de jure had the right to enter into relations with foreign states, conclude treaties with them and exchange diplomatic and consular representatives and participate in the activities of international organizations (including membership in international organizations).

In the process of perestroika, it was once again confirmed that de jure all Union republics have, constitutionally and in practice, the right to freely withdraw from the Soviet Union and even without the consent of the central government, but this process must be orderly. In particular, the consent of the Soviet Union as a permanent member of the UN Security Council was required to become a new member of the UN.

Another project of deep reform of the Soviet Union was also proposed. In 1989, the European-Asian Union was proposed by the co-chairman of the Interregional Deputy Group Andrei Sakharov, Nobel Peace Prize laureate, and with the participation of members of the group Galina Starovoitova (as a representative to the Congress of People's Deputies of the Soviet Union from Armenia), Anatoly Sobchak and others. Sakharov presented Gorbachev (Gorbachev was a chairman of the Constitutional Commission) with his draft Constitution of the Union of Soviet Republics of Europe and Asia on 27 November 1989.

=== New Union Treaty ===
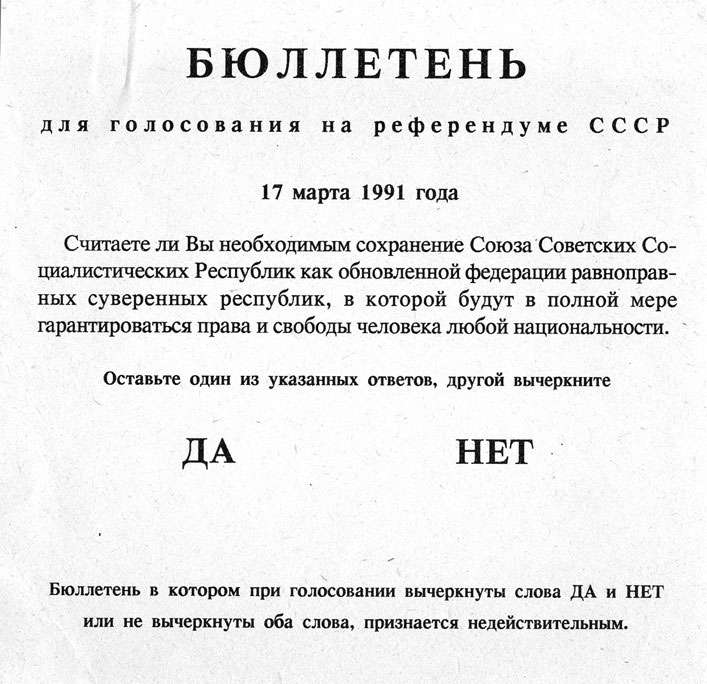
Ballot paper of the referendum of 17 March 1991

A less centralized federal system was proposed by Gorbachev during the Communist Party Congress of July 1990. A draft of the New Union Treaty was submitted to the Supreme Soviet of the Soviet Union on 23 November 1990. A drafting committee started work on the text on 1 January 1991. Six of the fifteen Soviet republics, however, did not participate in the drafting of the treaty: Armenia, Georgia, Moldova, Estonia, Latvia and Lithuania. The proposal was approved by the Soviet of the Union on 6 March and sent to the Supreme Soviets of each republic for approval.

=== Referendum ===
A referendum on the future of the Soviet Union was held on 17 March 1991 across the Soviet Union. The referendum asked whether to approve a new Union Treaty between the republics, to replace the 1922 treaty that created the USSR. The question put to most voters was:

Do you consider necessary the preservation of the Union of Soviet Socialist Republics as a renewed federation of equal sovereign republics in which the rights and freedom of an individual of any ethnicity will be fully guaranteed?

=== Coup attempt and response ===
A ceremony of the signing the New Union Treaty was scheduled for 20 August 1991, but was prevented by the August Coup a day earlier. Mikhail Gorbachev proved himself a weak leader and began to lose authority even more rapidly.

By September 1991, support for continuing the Soviet system had transitioned into reforming the Soviet Union into a confederation (not a federation) of sovereign states.

The Committee for Operational Management of the National Economy of the USSR was established by the Decree of the President of the USSR “On the Cabinet of Ministers of the USSR” of 24 August 1991. Ivan Silayev, Chairman of the Council of Ministers of the RSFSR, was appointed to head the committee.

== Transition period and new bodies of state power and administration ==
On 5 September 1991 the Law of the USSR “On the bodies of state power and administration of the Union of Soviet Socialist Republics in the transition period” was signed. According to it, the coordination of management of the national economy, economic reforms and social policy were entrusted to the Inter-Republican Economic Committee (IEC), which was being created by the Union Republics on a parity basis. According to the decree of the President of the USSR of 6 September, the committee was to cease its activity from the moment the IEC began its work. On 20 September, Ivan Silayev was appointed Chairman of the IEC.

According to the text of the law:

Article 1: During the transition period, the highest representative body of power of the Union of the USSR shall be the Supreme Soviet of the USSR, consisting of two separate chambers: the Soviet of the Republics and the Soviet of the Union.

Article 3: For the coordinated decision of internal and foreign policy matters affecting the common interests of the republics, the State Council of the USSR shall be formed on an inter-republican basis. The State Council of the USSR shall consist of the President of the USSR and the highest officials of the Union republics named in the Constitution of the USSR. The work of the State Council of the USSR is directed by the President of the USSR. The State Council of the USSR determines the procedure for its activities. Decisions of the State Council of the USSR shall be binding.

Article 4: The post of Vice-President of the USSR shall be abolished.

Article 5: In order to coordinate the management of the national economy and the coordinated implementation of economic reforms and social policy, the Union republics shall form, on a parity basis, the Inter-Republican Economic Committee. The Chairman of the Committee shall be appointed by the President of the USSR with the consent of the State Council of the USSR. The leadership of the Union-wide bodies in charge of defense, security, law and order and international affairs shall be exercised by the President of the USSR and the State Council of the USSR.

The Inter-Republican Economic Committee and the heads of the Union-wide bodies are accountable in their activities to the President of the USSR, the State Council of the USSR, and the Supreme Soviet of the USSR.

On 6 September 1991, the State Council of the USSR at its first meeting recognized the independence of the three Baltic republics: Latvia, Lithuania and Estonia.

== Russia's special role as the legal successor to the Soviet Union and conflicts in RSFSR government ==
On 24 September, RSFSR State Secretary Gennady Burbulis arrived to Boris Yeltsin, who was on vacation at the Black Sea coast. He brought a document “Russia's Strategy for the Transition Period”, which later received the unofficial name “Burbulis Memorandum”. The “memorandum” contained an analysis of the situation in the country, proposals on what should be done without delay, prepared by Yegor Gaidar's group. The document concluded that Russia should take the course of economic independence with a “soft”, “temporary” political alliance with other republics, i.e. to create not a declared, but a truly independent state of Russia. 30 years later, Burbulis recalled that the Burbulis Memorandum was the reform concept of Gaidar's group: There was not any secrecy. First Yegor Gaidar made a report at the State Council of the RSFSR, and then Burbulis spoke at the State Council and said he would make a report for Yeltsin.

As the Kommersant newspaper wrote on 7 October 1991, a series of conflicts occurred in the RSFSR government during preparations for the signing of the Treaty on the Economic Community. In his speech to members of the Russian parliament, RSFSR State Secretary Gennady Burbulis declared Russia's special role as the legal successor to the Soviet Union. Accordingly, the ways of drafting agreements with the republics should be determined by the Russian leadership. Instead of the planned order, he suggested signing a political agreement first, followed by an economic one. The newspaper suggested that Burbulis' goal was to persuade Yeltsin not to sign the agreement as it stands at the time. Yegor Gaidar, Alexander Shokhin and Konstantin Kagalovsky were named as the developers of the statement made by Burbulis. In the same time, a group of "isolationist patriots" consisting of Mikhail Maley, Nikolai Fedorov, Alexander Shokhin, Igor Lazarev and Mikhail Poltoranin criticized Ivan Silaev and Yevgeny Saburov for wanting to preserve the Soviet Union.

== Negotiations on an Economic treaty ==
On 1 October in Alma-Ata, at Nazarbayev's invitation, the leaders of 13 sovereign states and the Inter-Republican Economic Committee met in the format of Nazarbayev's plan “15 + 0”. Only Lithuania and Estonia did not participate. Nazarbayev announced that 10 of the 13 republic leaders present in Alma-Ata had pre-agreed to adopt an economic community treaty in the near future. As a result of the meeting a communiqué was signed. 8 republics - Russia, Ukraine, Belarus, Uzbekistan, Kazakhstan, Kyrgyzstan, Tajikistan and Turkmenistan - adopted a statement on the need to sign a treaty on economic community before 15 October 1991. Armenia, Azerbaijan, Georgia and Moldova expressed their intention to join it later. According to Grigory Yavlinsky, on 1 October the draft Treaty was approved by the prime ministers and plenipotentiary representatives of the 12 sovereign republics. Nazarbayev said that “the economic treaty is not only an economic, but also a political document. And the fact that 12 republics have clearly stated their intention to sign it (some by 15 November, others somewhat later) allows me to be optimistic about the future.”

On 3 October, Latvian Prime Minister Ivars Godmanis held a press conference in Riga, where he spoke about the results of the meeting of leaders of 13 former Soviet republics held in Alma-Ata on 1 October. The Latvian prime minister confirmed that his state intends to become an associate member of the economic area and common market, which are formed by the former Soviet republics, but Latvia does not intend to use the ruble. Ivars Godmanis was the only representative of the Baltics: representatives of Estonia and Lithuania did not come to Alma-Ata.

The original proposed name was the Treaty on Economic Union, which was renamed the Treaty on Economic Community with a lower degree of integration. On 18 October 1991, in the St. George Hall of the Grand Kremlin Palace Mikhail Gorbachev and the leaders of eight Union republics (excluding Ukraine, Moldova, Georgia and Azerbaijan) signed the Treaty on the Economic Community as planned. Ukraine and Moldova said they would sign at a later date. The signing ceremony was attended by a Ukrainian delegation headed by Deputy Chairman of the Supreme Council of Ukraine Ivan Plyushch and Deputy Prime Minister Masik. Plyushch told journalists that the situation should not be perceived as “Ukraine slammed the door”. He firmly assured that Ukraine would join the community after discussing some remarks and concluding bilateral agreements between the republics. The signing ceremony was also attended by representatives of Moldova, who also clearly expressed the republic's desire to become a member of the newly created economic union.

The Treaty was signed in Moscow on 18 October 1991 in a single copy in the Russian language by the competent representatives:

- Levon Ter-Petrosyan (Armenia)
- Stanislav Shushkevich (Belarus)
- Nursultan Nazarbayev (Kazakhstan)
- Askar Akayev (Kyrgyzstan)
- Boris Yeltsin (Russia)
- Akbarsho Iskandarov (Tajikistan)
- Saparmurat Niyazov (Turkmenistan)
- Islam Karimov (Uzbekistan)
- Mikhail Gorbachev (USSR President)

== Proposed political treaty ==
This economic agreement was then to be supplemented by a similar political agreement. On 14 November in Novo-Ogaryovo, Mikhail Gorbachev and the heads of the seven union republics pre-agreed to sign a treaty on the creation of a political union called the Union of Sovereign States, which would have no constitution but would remain a subject of international law as the Soviet Union had been. The Treaty would complement the previous economic treaty and was scheduled to be signed in December.

It was assumed that the Soviet Union would come out of the transition period with a new name of the Union when all the treaties are signed, ratified, come into force and the new parliament assembled. However, this did not happen.

== Non-participation of Ukraine and Belovezha Accords ==
A referendum on the Act of Declaration of Independence was held in Ukraine on 1 December 1991.

On 4 December 1991, 12 republics (except the Baltic states) signed an agreement on joint liability for repaying the USSR's debt to external creditors, according to which Russia's share was 61% of the Soviet debt.

Because of the referendum results and the actions of the Verkhovna Rada, Leonid Kravchuk refused on 7 December to sign such a political agreement that did not take Ukraine's status into account. Boris Yeltsin said that if Ukraine would not sign, then Russia would not sign either, although at this moment, besides Russia, six republics still wanted to sign the new Union treaty. The Belovezha Accords were signed on 8 December, where it was Burbulis who authored the phrase “The Union of Soviet Socialist Republics as a subject of international law and geopolitical reality ceases to exist.” The agreement declared the dissolution of the USSR by its remaining founder states (denunciation of the Treaty on the Creation of the USSR) and established the Commonwealth of Independent States (CIS).

Immediately after the signing, Russian President Yeltsin called U.S. President George H. W. Bush and specifically read Article 6 of the Agreement. "First of all, I talked with USSR Minister of Defense Shaposhnikov. I want to read the 6th Article of the Agreement. As a matter of fact Shaposhnikov fully agreed and supported our position. I am now reading Article 6." ... "Please note well the next paragraph, Mr. President (and I urge the interpreter to translate this precisely)." ... "Dear George, I am finished. This is extremely, extremely important. Because of the tradition between us, I couldn't even wait ten minutes to call you." According to the text of Article 6, Russia, Ukraine and Belarus form a “common military and strategic space” and “united armed forces.”

On 10 December, the accord was ratified by the Ukrainian and Belarusian parliaments. On 12 December, the agreement was ratified by the Russian Parliament, therefore the Russian SFSR renounced the Treaty on the Creation of the USSR and de facto declared Russia's independence from the USSR.

Khasbulatov recalled in his book, "Yeltsin successfully shifted the blame for the collapse of the USSR to Ukraine." and “The Russian Federation legally withdrew from the USSR, it happened on 12 December 1991, 13:28.” after the ratification of the agreement by the Russian Parliament.

On 26 December 1991, the USSR was self-dissolved by the Council of the Republics of the Supreme Soviet of the Soviet Union, the upper house of the Supreme Soviet of the Soviet Union (the lower house, the Soviet of the Union, was without a quorum).

In 2019, Kravchuk recalled that in the referendum to confirm Ukraine's independence in 1991, Ukrainian residents assumed they were voting for an independent country that would still be together with Russia.

== Succession, continuity and legacy of the Soviet Union ==
On December 21, 1991, the Council of Heads of State decided that the member states of the Commonwealth, referring to Article 12 of the Agreement on the Establishment of the Commonwealth of Independent States, based on the intention of each state to fulfill obligations under the UN Charter and participate in the work of this organization as full members, taking into account that the original members of the UN were the Republic of Belarus, the USSR and Ukraine, expressing satisfaction that the Republic of Belarus and Ukraine continue to participate in the UN as sovereign independent states, decided that "the Commonwealth States support Russia in continuing the membership of the USSR in the UN, including permanent membership in the Security Council, and other international organizations." The document entered into force for 11 countries on December 21.

Boris Yeltsin, President of Russia, sent a letter to NATO asking it to consider accepting Russia as a member of the alliance sometime in the future. In the letter to NATO, Yeltsin stated, “This would contribute to an atmosphere of mutual understanding and trust and would strengthen stability and cooperation on the European continent. We regard this relationship as serious and wish to develop this dialog on all fronts, both on the political and military levels. Today we raise the issue of Russia's membership in NATO, however, we see this as a long-term political goal.”

On December 23, Russia officially received the USSR's seat on the UN Security Council. The international community recognized it as continuator state to the Soviet Union.

On December 21, 1991, the Republic of Belarus, the Republic of Kazakhstan, the Russian Federation (RSFSR) and Ukraine signed the Agreement on Joint Measures Regarding Nuclear Weapons, according to which "until the complete elimination of nuclear weapons in the territories of the Republic of Belarus and Ukraine, the decision on the need to use them shall be taken in agreement with the heads of state participating in the Agreement by the President of the RSFSR", "the Republic of Belarus and Ukraine undertake to accede to the 1968 Treaty on the Non-Proliferation of Nuclear Weapons as non-nuclear states and to conclude an appropriate safeguards agreement with the IAEA", "by July 1, 1992, the Republic of Belarus, the Republic of Kazakhstan and Ukraine will ensure the removal of tactical nuclear weapons" and "the Governments of the Republic of Belarus, the Republic of Kazakhstan, the Russian Federation (RSFSR) and Ukraine undertake to submit the START Treaty for ratification to the Supreme Councils of their states". Belarus, Russia and Kazakhstan have ratified the agreement, but since Ukraine has not ratified it, it has not entered into force.

On December 25, M.S. Gorbachev announced his resignation as President of the USSR and handed over the "nuclear briefcase" to the President of the RSFSR B.N. Yeltsin.

On December 30, 1991, 11 countries signed the Agreement between the participant states of the Commonwealth of Independent States on Strategic Forces, according to which "the member states of the Commonwealth recognize the need for a unified command of the Strategic Forces and the maintenance of unified control over nuclear weapons", "For the period until their complete destruction, nuclear weapons deployed on the territory of Ukraine are under the control of the unified command of the Strategic Forces with the aim of not using them and dismantling them by the end of 1994, including tactical nuclear weapons - by July 1, 1992", "The process of destroying nuclear weapons deployed on the territory of the Republic of Belarus and Ukraine is carried out with the participation of the Republic of Belarus, the Russian Federation and Ukraine under the joint control of the Commonwealth states". The document entered into force for 11 countries on December 30.

After the dissolution of the USSR on 26 December 1991, all former Soviet Union property was automatically transferred to Russian ownership. On 2 April 1992, Russia declared itself the sole legal successor to all debts of the former USSR and pledged to repay them in full, while receiving rights to all financial and material assets of the USSR. The remaining former Soviet republics could start with a "clean slate". In this case, they would have neither debts nor assets.

On 30 December 1991, 11 countries signed the Agreement of the Heads of State of the Commonwealth of Independent States on the property of the former USSR abroad, according to which "the member states of the Commonwealth mutually recognize that each of them has the right to an appropriate fixed fair share in the property of the former USSR abroad and will facilitate the implementation of this right." The document entered into force for 11 countries on December 30.

On 6 July 1992, 11 countries signed the Agreement on the distribution of all property of the former USSR abroad, according to which "the termination of the existence of the USSR as a state-subject of international law dictates the need for the earliest possible settlement of a set of issues related to the property of the former USSR abroad between the successor states represented by the Republic of Azerbaijan, the Republic of Armenia, the Republic of Belarus, the Republic of Kazakhstan, the Republic of Kyrgyzstan, the Republic of Moldova, the Russian Federation, the Republic of Tajikistan, Turkmenistan, the Republic of Uzbekistan and Ukraine." Movable and immovable property of the former USSR outside its territory and investments located abroad are subject to division and shall pass to the Parties in accordance with the following scale of fixed shares in the assets of the former USSR based on a single aggregate indicator. The document entered into force for 11 countries on 6 July 1992.

=== Commonwealth of Independent States ===
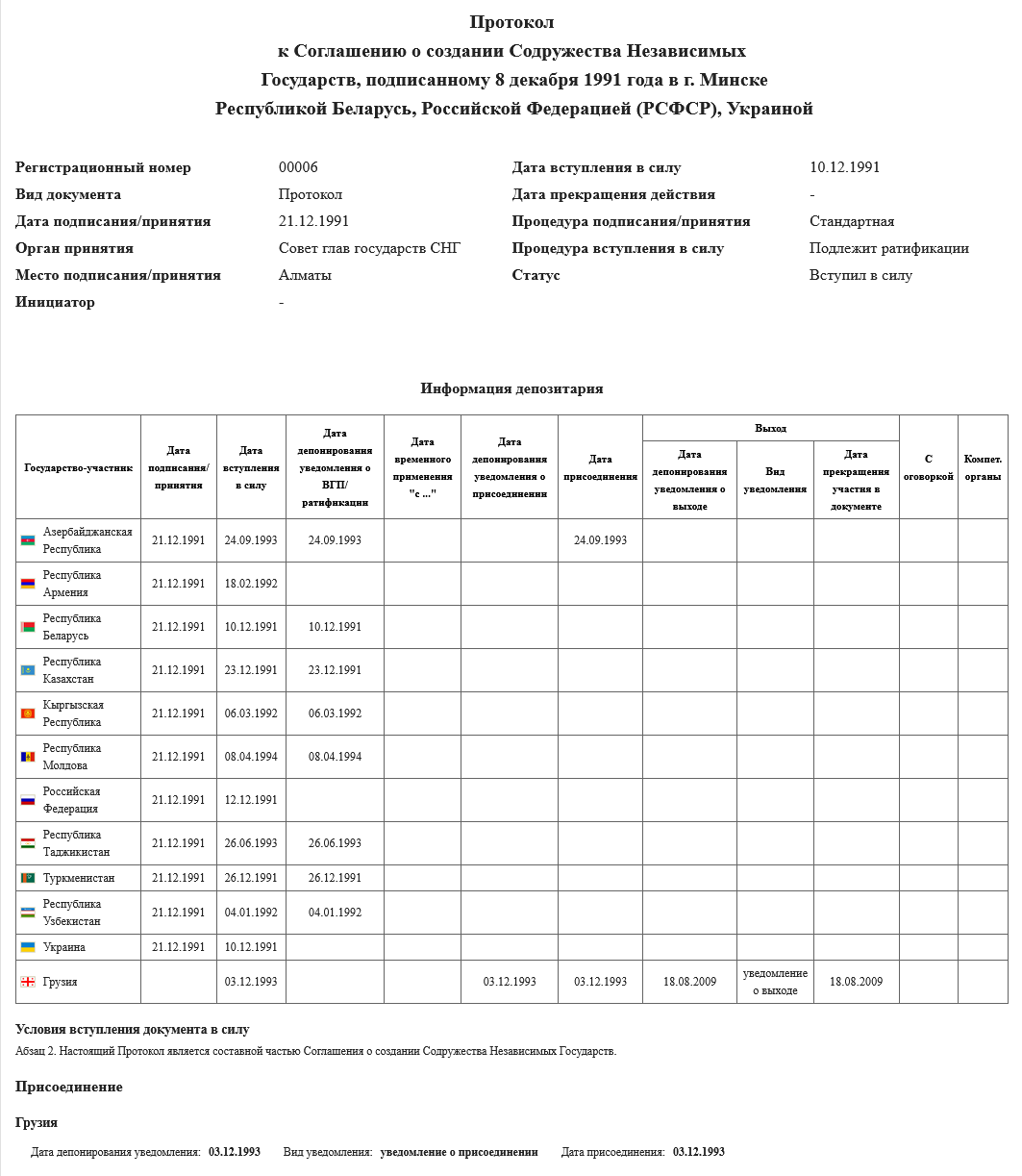
The Protocol to the Agreement on the Creation of the Commonwealth of Independent States dated 21 December 1991. The information from the depository of the international agreement published on the Unified Register of Legal Acts and Other Documents of the Commonwealth of Independent States (under the executive committee of the Commonwealth of Independent States) as of 2024.

The Commonwealth of Independent States (CIS) was founded by an Agreement on the creation the Commonwealth of Independent States (Соглашение о создании Содружества Независимых Государств) signed on 8 December 1991 by Russia, Belarus and Ukraine. According to Article 7, the High Contracting Parties indicate that through common coordinating institutions, their joint activities will consist in coordinating foreign policy activities, cooperation in the formation and development of a common economic space, common European and Eurasian markets, in the field of customs policy, in the field of customs policy, in the development of transport and communication systems, cooperation in the field of environmental protection, migration policy and the fight against organized crime.

The heads of 5 Central Asian republics met in Ashgabat on 12–13 December. The inspirer of the Ashgabat statement, Nursultan Nazarbayev, informed his colleagues about the meeting with Yeltsin, during which the Russian president said that the creation of the commonwealth was not an accomplished fact, but only a proposal sent to the republics for consideration. Further prospects of the inter-republican commonwealth will be discussed on 21 December in Alma-Ata, where Nursultan Nazarbayev invited the leaders of all 12 republics. 5 republics confirmed that the integration of the former Soviet republics has come to an impasse, and stated that all five are ready to become equal co-founders of the Commonwealth, they called for special attention to economic cooperation, as well as the previously concluded Treaty on the Economic Community (On 18 October 1991), which is necessary to confirm and finalize.

Nazarbayev later recalled that the heads of state were satisfied with "Ukraine's return to the integration process".

In Alma-Ata, on 21 December, 11 Republics became co-founders of the Commonwealth. In 2019, CIS Executive Secretary Sergei Lebedev recalled that it was in Ashgabat on 13 December 1991 that the historic meeting of the leaders of Turkmenistan, Kazakhstan, Kyrgyzstan, Tajikistan and Uzbekistan took place, which prepared the conditions for signing the Alma-Ata Declaration, which became the basis for the formation of the CIS in its current form.

At a press conference in Almaty on 21 December 1991, Leonid Kravchuk answered the journalist's question “Question to all (heads of state). Why did you refuse the name Commonwealth of Euro-Asian and Independent States?” as follows: “The fact is that the beginning of the Commonwealth and the foundation of the Commonwealth was laid in Minsk and the corresponding name was given to the Commonwealth there. After that three states - Belarus, Russia, Ukraine - have already ratified these documents. Therefore, it would be unreasonable to change the name both legally and politically.” Nursultan Nazarbayev immediately added: “But in the Declaration, which you will read tomorrow, the economic area is called Eurasian.”

The Soviet Union officially self-dissolved on 26 December 1991, and this date is considered the date of the final recognition of independence by the Soviet Union. The Commonwealth countries agreed to cancel price limits in a coordinated manner and switch to market prices on 2 January 1992.

On 24 September 1993, Armenia, Azerbaijan, Belarus, Kazakhstan, Kyrgyzstan, Moldova, Russia, Tajikistan, Uzbekistan, Ukraine and Georgia signed the Agreement on the Creation of the interstate Euroasian Coal and Metal Community, which entered into force in 1995 for Kazakhstan, Moldova, Russia, Tajikistan, Uzbekistan, and in 1996 entered into force for Belarus, Kyrgyzstan and Ukraine. On 12 January 1994, the Kommersant newspaper wrote that “for the first time since the dissolution of the Soviet Union, representatives of economic sectors have managed to create a supra-governmental body that has not only recommendatory functions, but also has the ability to solve most of the production issues of metallurgical and coal enterprises” and the authority of the Euroasian Community of Coal and Metal is mandatory for the governing bodies of the participating countries, rather than recommendations.

On 24 September 1993, at a meeting of the Commonwealth of Independent States (CIS) Council of Heads of State in Moscow, Azerbaijan, Armenia, Belarus, Kazakhstan, Kyrgyzstan, Moldova, Russia, Tajikistan, Uzbekistan signed the Treaty on the creation of an Economic Union which reinforces by an international agreement the intention to create an economic union through the step-by-step creation of a free trade area, a customs union and conditions for the free movement of goods, services, capital and labor. All these countries have ratified the Treaty and it entered into force on January 14, 1994. Turkmenistan and Georgia joined in 1994 and ratified the Treaty, but Georgia withdrew in 2009. A number of other documents and agreements were adopted for the development of the economic union. For example, on 21 October 1994, an Agreement on the creation of a Payment Union of States was signed and the Main directions of integration development and a perspective plan for integration development were adopted. The purpose of the union is to form common economic space grounded on free movement of goods, services, labour force, capital; to elaborate coordinated monetary, tax, price, customs, external economic policy; to bring together methods of regulating economic activity and create favourable conditions for the development of direct production relations. On 15 April 1994, the "Agreement on Ukraine's accession to the Economic Union as an associate member" was signed by Azerbaijan, Armenia, Belarus, Kazakhstan, Kyrgyzstan, Moldova, Russia, Tajikistan, Turkmenistan, Uzbekistan, Ukraine and Georgia but never entered into force due to non-ratification by Russia, Ukraine, Turkmenistan and Georgia, although all the others ratified.

As a permanent functioning coordinating and executive body of the Economic Union of 1993, the Interstate Economic Committee has been established. Exactly the same name was used as in 1991, but the body was not given supranational authority.

On 29 March 1994, President of Kazakhstan Nursultan Nazarbayev complained that the CIS was inadequate and did not provide the integration that the countries badly needed. He proposed the creation of a Eurasian Union of States as a new organization completely separate from the CIS. The Eurasian Union of States was proposed as a combination of the economic union and political union. For the first time it was suggested to use the name “Eurasian” for an economic union rather than “Euro-Asian” or “Euroasian”. The Eurasian Economic Union traces its history back to Nazarbayev's proposal. The process of integration of post-Soviet countries is also called Eurasian economic integration.

== See also ==
- Regional organizations in the Post-Soviet states
- Dissolution of the Soviet Union
- Treaty on the Creation of the Union of Soviet Socialist Republics
- Declaration of the Creation of the Union of Soviet Socialist Republics
- Commonwealth of Independent States
