= Commonwealth of Independent States Agreement on the Establishment of a Free Trade Area =

Agreement on the Establishment of a Free Trade Area (Russian: Соглашение о создании зоны свободной торговли), Protocol on Amendments and Additions to the Agreement on the Establishment of a Free Trade Area of 15 April 1994 (Russian: Протокол о внесении изменений и дополнений в Соглашение о создании зоны свободной торговли от 15 апреля 1994 года)
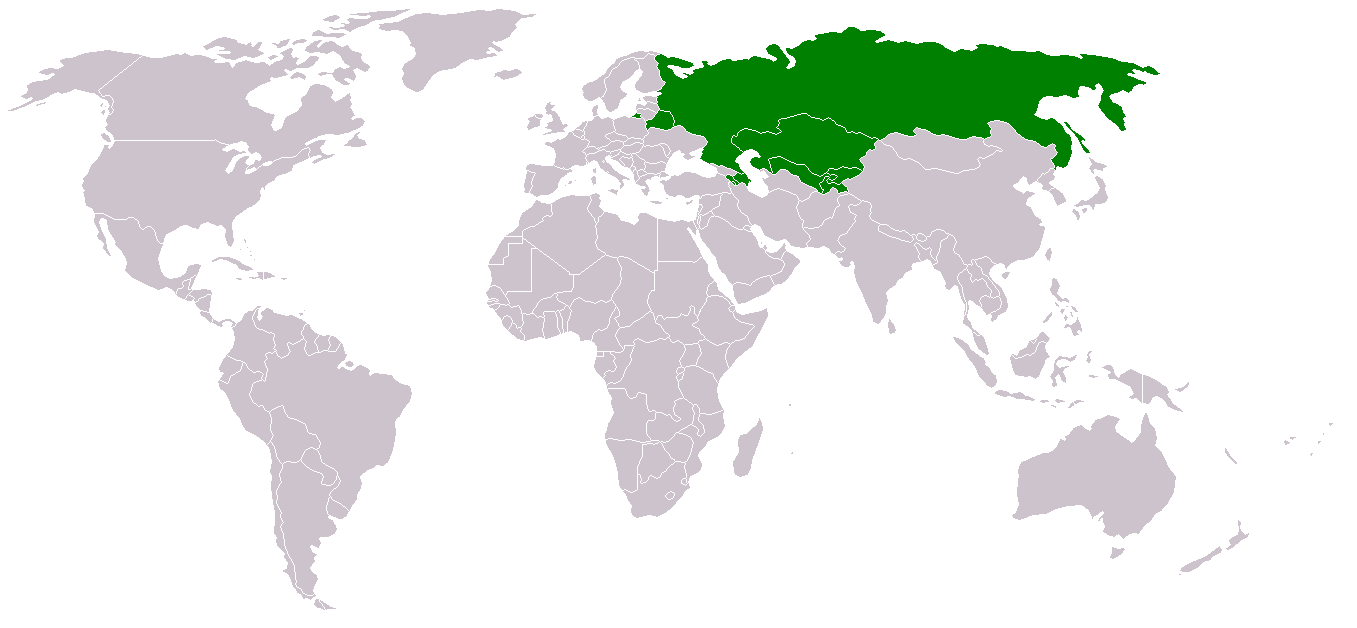
- Type: Free-trade area
- Member states: Armenia; Azerbaijan; Belarus; Georgia; Kazakhstan; Kyrgyzstan; Moldova; Russia (only provisional application of the 1994 agreement and the signatory of the protocol); Tajikistan; Turkmenistan (only provisional application of the 1994 agreement and has not signed the protocol); Ukraine; Uzbekistan

Establishment
  - Agreement signed: 15 April 1994
  - Protocol on multilateral free trade signed: 2 April 1999
  - Multilateral Free Trade Area established: 24 November 1999

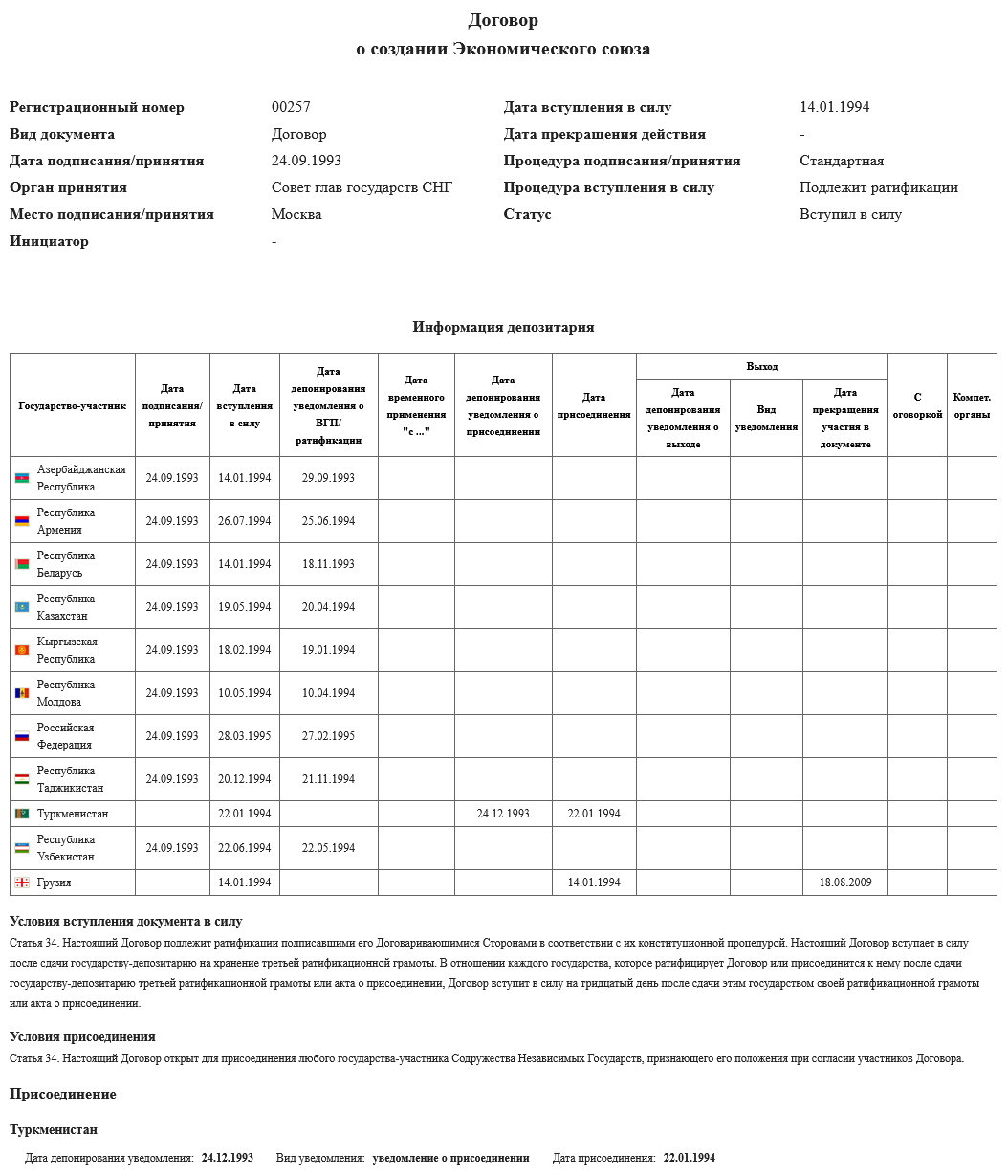
The Treaty on the Creation of the Economic Union dated 24 September 1993. The information from the depository of the international agreement published on the Unified Register of Legal Acts and Other Documents of the Commonwealth of Independent States (under the executive committee of the Commonwealth of Independent States) as of 2024.

The Agreement on the Establishment of a Free Trade Area (Russian: Соглашение о создании зоны свободной торговли) is an international agreement on the intention to create a free trade regime in goods signed by 12 post-Soviet states on 15 April 1994, at a meeting of the Commonwealth of Independent States (CIS) Council of Heads of State in Moscow and entered into force on December 30, 1994. Article 1 indicated that this was "the first stage of the creation of the Economic Union" (earlier envisaged by the Treaty on the creation of an Economic Union signed on 24 September 1993 by Azerbaijan, Armenia, Belarus, Kazakhstan, Kyrgyzstan, Moldova, Russia, Tajikistan, Uzbekistan which were later joined by Turkmenistan and Georgia), but on 2 April 1999 the countries agreed to remove this phrase from the agreement. Article 17 also confirmed the intention to conclude a free trade agreement in services (later it will be launched in 2012 as a part of Eurasian Economic Space and through 2023 agreement within CIS framework).

The 1994 Agreement introduced the freedom of transit of goods, provided for cooperation in several areas, served as a framework for bilateral agreements and, at the first stage, introduced a bilateral free trade regime for the subsequent transition to a multilateral free trade regime. According to the executive committee of the Commonwealth of Independent States, as of 2023, the Agreement is in force for Armenia, Azerbaijan, Belarus, Georgia, Kazakhstan, Kyrgyzstan, Moldova, Tajikistan, Uzbekistan and Ukraine which signed and deposited the notification of ratification / execution of national procedures, while Russia and Turkmenistan have signed and notified the provisional application of the Agreement.

On 2 April 1999, in Moscow, the presidents of 11 countries, namely Armenia, Azerbaijan, Belarus, Georgia, Kazakhstan, Kyrgyzstan, Moldova, Russia, Tajikistan, Uzbekistan and Ukraine signed a Protocol on Amendments and Additions to the Agreement on the Establishment of a Free Trade Area of 15 April 1994 (Russian: Протокол о внесении изменений и дополнений в Соглашение о создании зоны свободной торговли от 15 апреля 1994 года). Turkmenistan did not participate. The Protocol entered into force on 24 November 1999 for those countries that had completed ratification. As of 2023, the Protocol has entered into force for all countries, namely Armenia, Azerbaijan, Belarus, Georgia, Kazakhstan, Kyrgyzstan, Moldova, Tajikistan, Uzbekistan and Ukraine, except Russia, which remains a signatory but has not notified entry into force or provisional application. According to the analytical material of the executive committee of the Commonwealth of Independent States, the 1999 Protocol replaced the existing bilateral free trade regime with a multilateral regime.

The World Trade Organization was notified on June 29, 1999. The Agreement is designated as "Plurilateral" and "In Force" as of 2023. The terms of the FTA allow member states to enter into the FTA agreements with other countries, as well as to join/create custom unions. Although the countries of the Eurasian Economic Union have delegated their powers to conclude free trade agreements to the supranational level, according to the Treaty on the Eurasian Economic Union (Article 102), the previous agreements with third countries concluded before 1 January 2015 continue to be in force. Like other Commonwealth of Independent States agreements, this agreement does not regulate relations with third countries and allows differentiated integration (a.k.a. à la carte and multi-speed Europe).

The WTO's Regional Trade Agreements Information System indicates Azerbaijan, Georgia, Turkmenistan and Uzbekistan as "Current signatories". This contradicts the information provided by the CIS and the countries themselves.

== 1994 Framework for bilateral agreements and Freedom of Transit ==
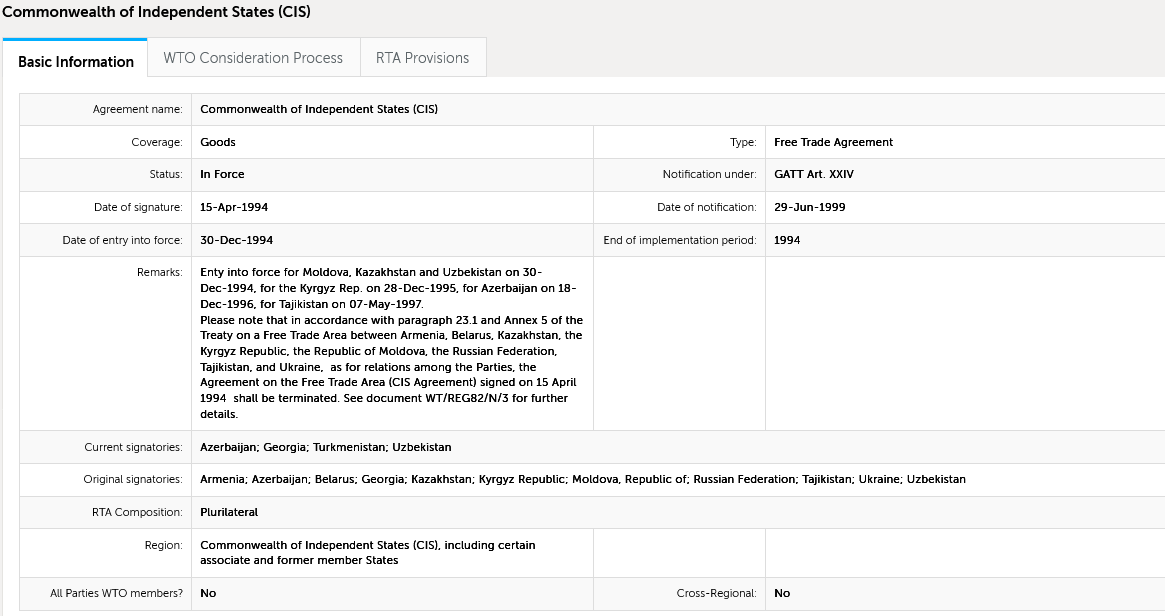
Regional Trade Agreements Database of the World Trade Organization.

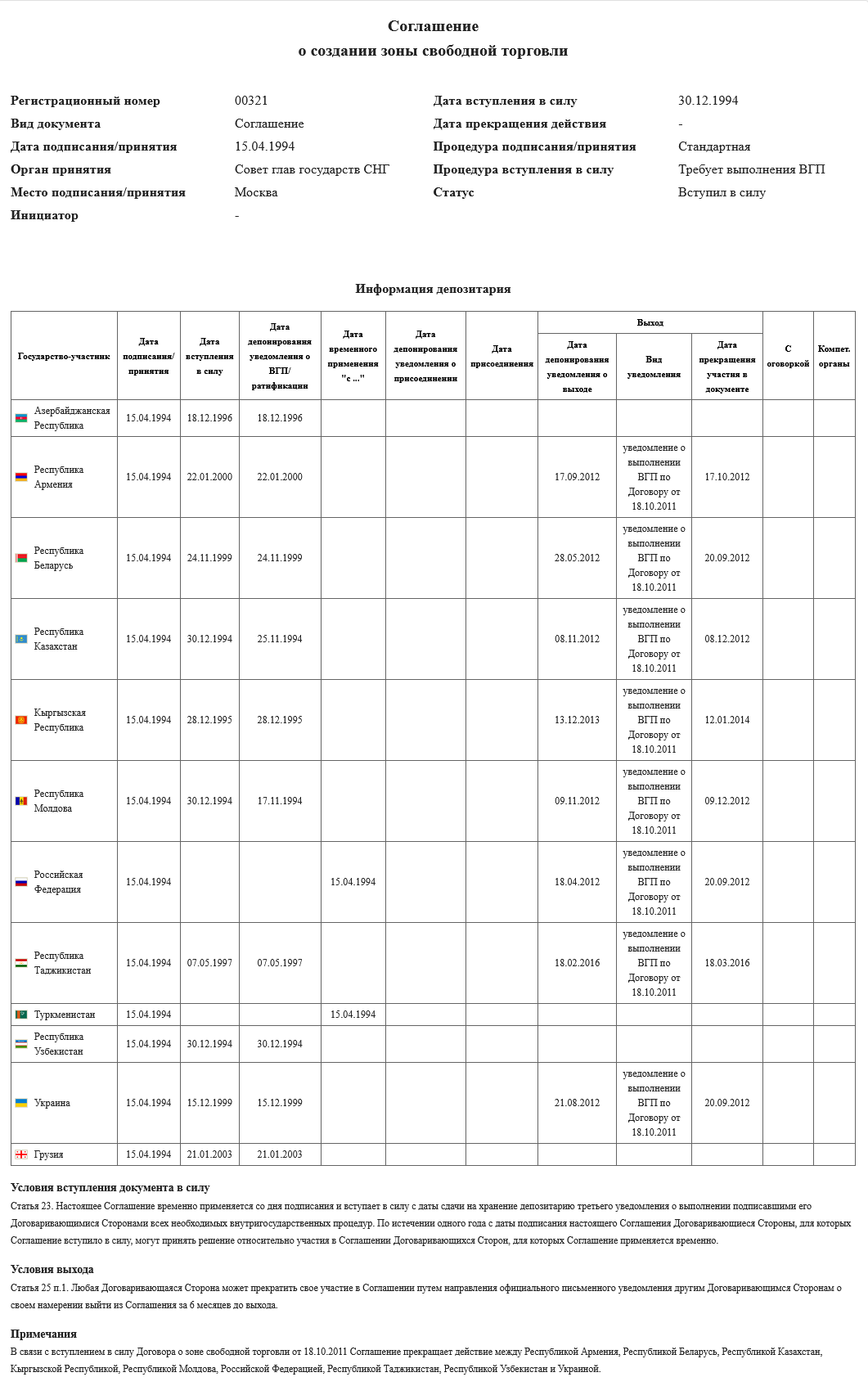
The Agreement on the Creation of Free Trade Area dated 15 April 1994. The information from the depository of the international agreement published on the Unified Register of Legal Acts and Other Documents of the Commonwealth of Independent States (under the executive committee of the Commonwealth of Independent States) as of 2024.

On 15 April 1994, at a meeting of the Commonwealth of Independent States (CIS) Council of Heads of State in Moscow, the presidents of 12 countries, namely Armenia, Azerbaijan, Belarus, Georgia, Kazakhstan, Kyrgyzstan, Moldova, Russia, Tajikistan, Turkmenistan, Uzbekistan and Ukraine signed an Agreement on the Establishment of a Free Trade Area (Соглашение о создании зоны свободной торговли). The Agreement entered into force on 30 December 1994 for those countries that had completed ratification. As of 2023, the Agreement is fully in force for Armenia, Azerbaijan, Belarus, Georgia, Kazakhstan, Kyrgyzstan, Moldova, Tajikistan, Uzbekistan and Ukraine, while Russia and Turkmenistan have notified the application of the Agreement on a provisional basis. According to the executive committee of the Commonwealth of Independent States, no one has ceased participation in the Agreement, made reservations or suspended the application.

Bilateral FTAs concluded on the basis of CIS 1994 as a framework agreement. According to the analytical material of the executive committee of the Commonwealth of Independent States, the 1994 version has not yet provided for multilateral free trade, but the conclusion of many bilateral agreements. Under the 1994 version, the free trade regime enters into force when conditions are met, but, for example, the freedom of transit enters into force immediately between participants. According to the text, transit transportation should not be subject to unreasonable delays or restrictions and the conditions of transit, including tariffs for transportation by any mode of transport and the provision of services, should not be worse than for domestic shippers, recipients and owners of goods, as well as no worse than the conditions for any third country.

== 1999 Protocol introducing a multilateral free trade area ==
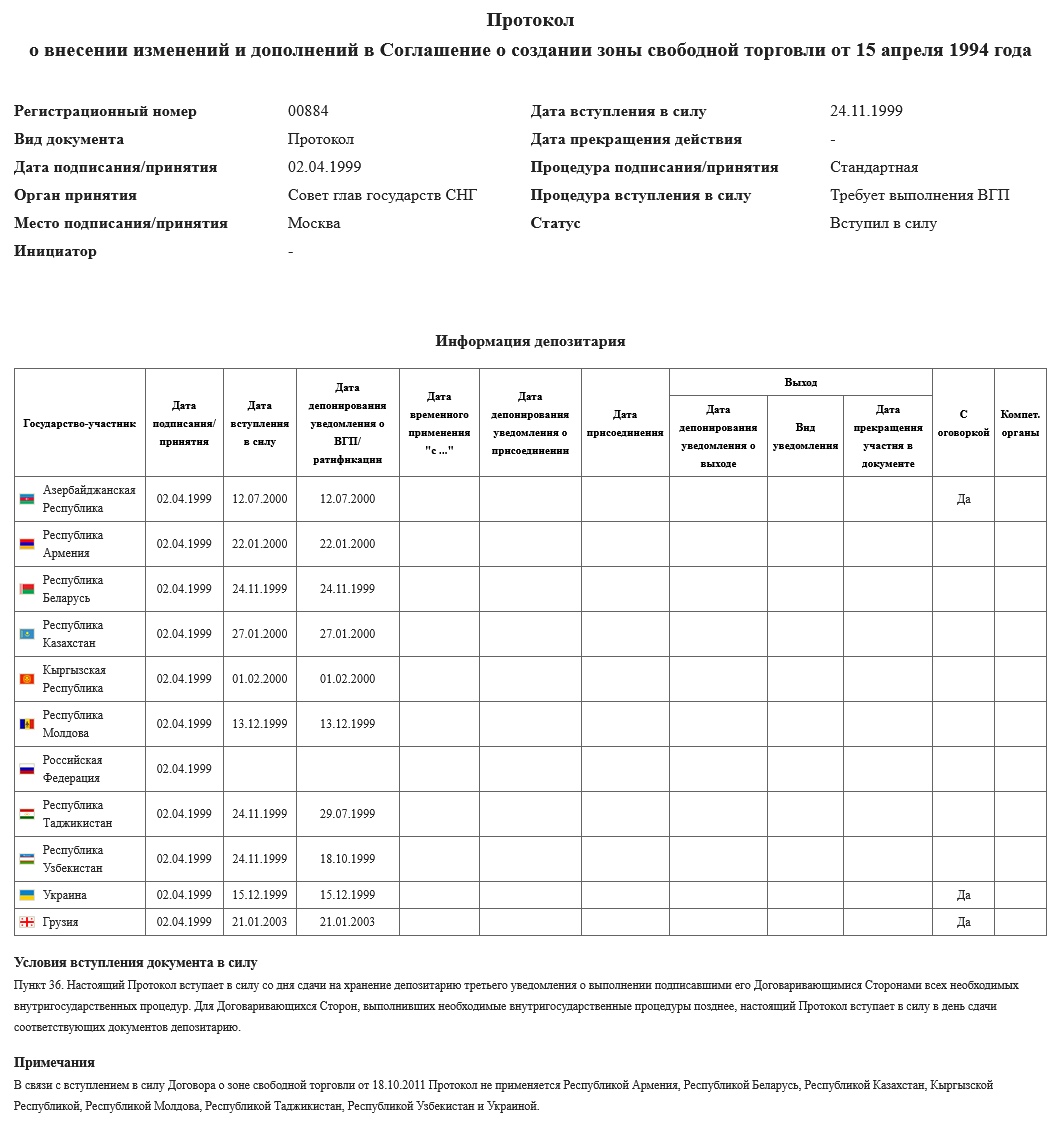
The Protocol on Amendments and Additions to the Agreement on the Creation of Free Trade Area. The information from the depository of the international agreement published on the Unified Register of Legal Acts and Other Documents of the Commonwealth of Independent States (under the executive committee of the Commonwealth of Independent States) as of 2024.

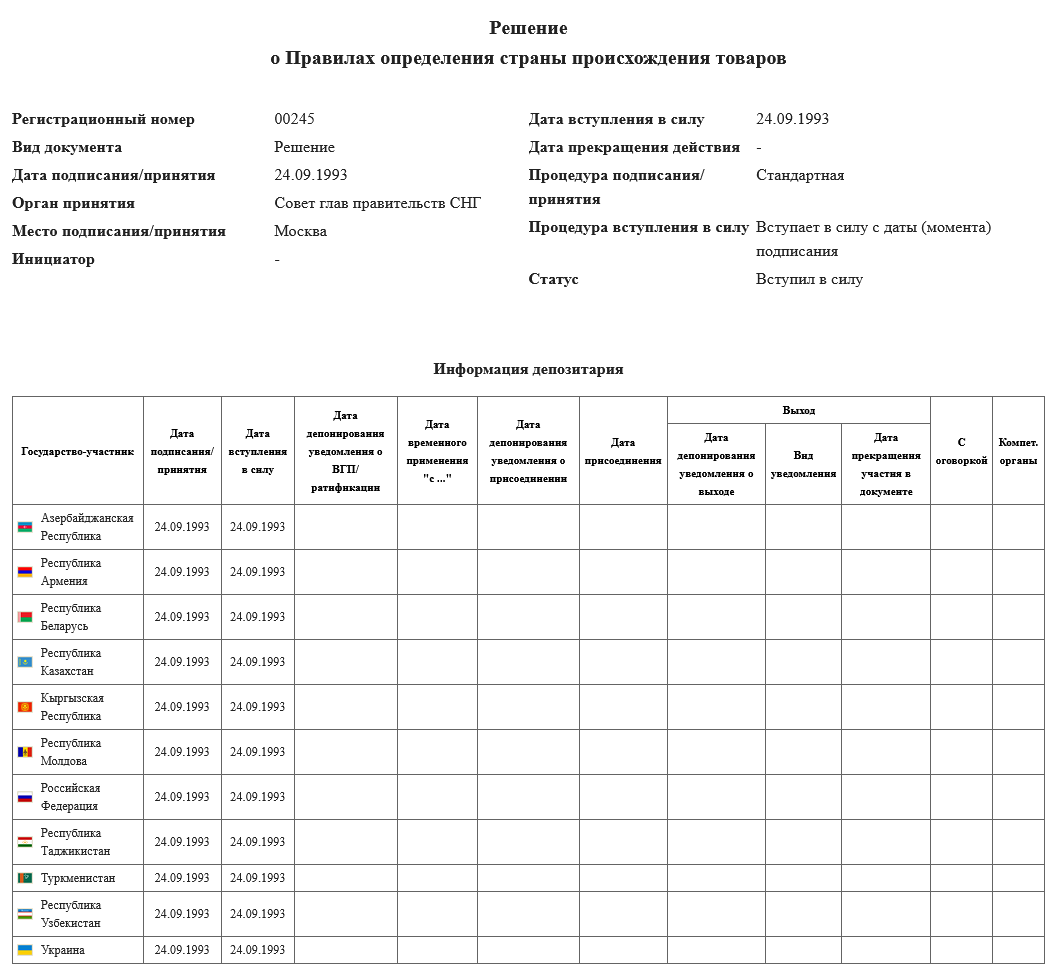
The Rules of origin dated 24 September 1993. The information from the depository of the international agreement published on the Unified Register of Legal Acts and Other Documents of the Commonwealth of Independent States (under the executive committee of the Commonwealth of Independent States) as of 2024.

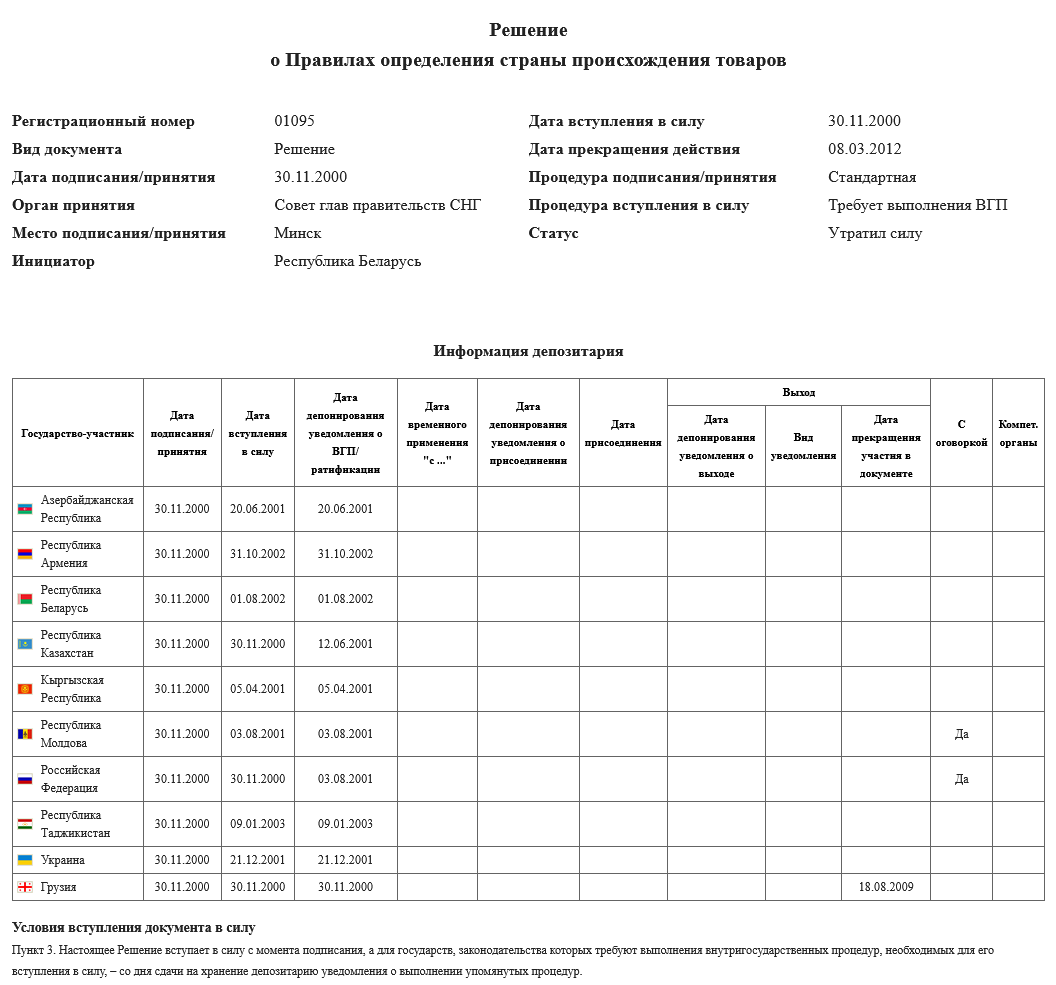
The Rules of origin dated 30 November 2000. The information from the depository of the international agreement published on the Unified Register of Legal Acts and Other Documents of the Commonwealth of Independent States (under the executive committee of the Commonwealth of Independent States) as of 2024.

On 2 April 1999, in Moscow, the presidents of 11 countries, namely Armenia, Azerbaijan, Belarus, Georgia, Kazakhstan, Kyrgyzstan, Moldova, Russia, Tajikistan, Uzbekistan and Ukraine signed a Protocol on Amendments and Additions to the Agreement on the Establishment of a Free Trade Area of 15 April 1994 (Протокол о внесении изменений и дополнений в Соглашение о создании зоны свободной торговли от 15 апреля 1994 года). Turkmenistan did not participate. The Protocol entered into force on 24 November 1999 for those countries that had completed ratification. As of 2023, the Protocol has entered into force for all countries, namely Armenia, Azerbaijan, Belarus, Georgia, Kazakhstan, Kyrgyzstan, Moldova, Tajikistan, Uzbekistan and Ukraine, except Russia, which remains a signatory but has not notified entry into force or provisional application. According to the executive committee of the Commonwealth of Independent States, no one has ceased participation in the Protocol or suspended the application, while 1 reservation was made by Azerbaijan on non-application in relation to Armenia and 2 specific opinions were expressed by Georgia and Ukraine.

According to the analytical material of the executive committee of the Commonwealth of Independent States, the 1999 Protocol replaced the existing bilateral free trade regime with a multilateral regime, eliminated all fees, as well as taxes and levies with equivalent effect, and quantitative restrictions on the import and (or) export of goods in mutual trade of the FTA participating states, established a procedure for dispute resolution, etc. The 1999 version refers to the principles of the World Trade Organisation, envisages cooperation in economic policy, payments, customs cooperation, taxes, science, provides for a ratchet effect prohibiting the imposition of new tariffs and restrictions, provides for treatment no worse than that of any third country, and provides for the transit of goods on the basis of the principle of freedom of transit without discrimination.

Although in the 1990s many documents regulating the functioning of the free trade area were adopted, including rules of origin and re-export rules, and in the 2000s the Council of Heads of State aimed to finalise all procedures and fully launch the free trade area, the multilateral free trade regime was not actually fully formed. The parties to the Agreement never started to agree on a common list of exemptions from the free trade regime, which, according to the terms of this international treaty, should have become an integral part of it. The free trade regime, which was fixed in bilateral free trade agreements, continued to operate between the Commonwealth partners.

As Andrei Kushnirenko, director of the economic department of the CIS executive committee, stated in 2011, a free trade area without duties and quotas has formally existed in the CIS almost since its creation, regulated by bilateral agreements and the general agreement of 1994. The documents provide for numerous exceptions, often contradict each other and are morally outdated, for example, the country's ability to subsidize enterprises is not limited.

In 2007, a scientific article evaluated the legal framework for free trade in the post-Soviet space as a particular blend of 'à la carte multilateralism' and multiple bilateralism. "Both the bilateral and the multilateral regimes have undergone significant (often underestimated) development, and that the multilateral regime has generally sought to be more ambitious both in its substantive and institutional reach. Yet, both regimes can be described as ultimately weak and their overlap confusing. While a higher juridicization and comprehensive consolidation at the multilateral level of the CIS free trade regime may be recommended." it said.

== Application between Azerbaijan, Georgia, Turkmenistan, Uzbekistan and the rest of the participants ==
The 2011 CIS FTA Treaty envisages that the 1994 agreement and the 1999 protocol no longer apply between its 8 participants (Russia, Ukraine, Belarus, Kazakhstan, Kyrgyzstan, Tajikistan, Armenia and Moldova), however, among the rest of the countries, they continue to be applied.

International Trade Centre says the 1994 Agreement on the Establishment of a Free Trade Area signed by 12 CIS countries still continues to be used by Azerbaijan and Georgia in trade with other CIS countries except with Russia and Turkmenistan. Reportedly it is also used bilaterally between Uzbekistan and Tajikistan pending Tajikistan’s ratification of Uzbekistan’s accession to the 2011 CIS Free Trade Area Treaty.

When Georgia withdrew from the CIS in 2009, the Council of Heads of State noted that Georgia continued to be a party to international treaties that are open to participation by any state, including the 1994 Agreement and the 1999 Protocol. According to the Ministry of Economy of Georgia, as of 2023 Georgia has free trade regime with all CIS countries. Free trade regimes among the CIS countries, except Russian Federation, are regulated by the Multilateral Agreement on Creation of Free Trade Zone among the CIS countries (1994). “Enterprise Georgia” Organization, a government economic development agency operating under the Ministry of Economy and Sustainable Development of Georgia, indicates that Georgia participates in the Multilateral Agreement among the CIS countries (12 countries).

As of 2023, Georgia Revenue Service subordinated to the Ministry of Finance of Georgia informs that free trade regime with the Commonwealth of Independent States (CIS) countries, except the Russian Federation, is regulated by the Multilateral Agreement on the Creation of a Free Trade Area for CIS Countries (1994). Georgia has free trade regime with Azerbaijan, Belarus, Turkmenistan, Moldova, Armenia, Tajikistan, Uzbekistan, Ukraine, Kazakhstan and Kyrgyzstan and all of them are governed by Commonwealth of Independent States Multilateral Agreement of 1994 on the “Establishment of Free Trade Zone”. In trade with these CIS countries (except the Republic of Uzbekistan and the Russian Federation), preferential certificate of origin (CT-1) of goods is used to confirm preferential origin, issued in accordance with “Rules for Determining Country of Origin of Goods” approved by the Decision dated November 30, 2000 of the Council of Commonwealth of Independent States Heads of States. In trade with Uzbekistan, the Rules Determining the Country of Origin of Goods approved by the Commonwealth of Independent States Council of Heads of State on 24 September 1993 shall apply.

As of 2023, Ministry of Investment, Industry and Trade of the Republic of Uzbekistan informs that has free trade regime with Belarus, Georgia, Kazakhstan, the Kyrgyz Republic, Moldova, the Russian Federation, Turkmenistan (limited), Ukraine, Tajikistan and Azerbaijan. The Rules for Determining the country of Origin of goods, approved by the Decision of the Council of Commonwealth of Independent States Heads of Government of September 24, 1993, apply to goods originating from the CIS member States.

As stated in the 2020 World Trade Organization report on GUAM members, Azerbaijan has also been part of the free trade agreement since December 18, 1996. The same report confirms Georgia's membership in the FTA since December 30, 1994.

According to the Treaty on the Eurasian Economic Union (Article 102), the previous agreements with third countries concluded before 2015 continue to be in force. As of 2023, the Ministry of Economy of Kyrgyzstan informs that Kyrgyzstan is a party to the Agreement on the Establishment of a Free trade area of April 15, 1994 (as amended on April 2, 1999), signed within the CIS. In accordance with this Agreement, the free trade regime applies to trade with Georgia and Turkmenistan.

As of 2023, the Ministry of Foreign Affairs of Belarus informs that the Republic of Belarus is also a party to the Agreement on the Establishment of a Free Trade Area of 15 April 1994 (as amended on 2 April 1999), signed within the framework of the CIS. The Agreement continues to apply in relations with the member states for which the Free Trade Area Treaty of 18 October 2011 has not entered into force, in particular, with Azerbaijan and Georgia. The Ministry of Economy also points out that the 1994 Agreement, as amended in 1999, applies to Belarus' mutual trade with Georgia. Export.by Portal created by the Republican Unitary Enterprise «National Centre for Marketing and Price Study» informs that Belarus is also a Member of the CIS Agreement on Free Trade Area signed on April 15, 1994 (with alterations of April 2, 1999).

The WTO's Regional Trade Agreements Information System indicates Azerbaijan, Georgia, Turkmenistan and Uzbekistan as "Current signatories" and the Agreement is designated as "Plurilateral".

== See also ==
- Commonwealth of Independent States
- Economic integration
- Eurasian Economic Union
- Free trade areas in Europe
- Post-Soviet states
- Trade bloc
- Rules of Origin
- Market access
- Free-trade area
- Tariff
- Craiova Group
- Open Balkan
- CEFTA
