= International Investment Agreements of Russia =

Russia has concluded the following Bilateral Investment Treaties (BITs), Treaties with Investment Provisions (TIPs) and Investment Related Instruments (IRIs) according to the database of UNCTAD.

== Overview ==
International organizations such as the World Trade Organization periodically evaluate developments in trade and investment, trends and patterns in FDI and the investment regime for a particular country.

The U.S. government also periodically assesses investment conditions, openness to foreign investment, policies toward foreign direct investment, investment and tax treaties and trade facilitation measures.

== Bilateral Investment Treaties ==
No.	Short title	Status	Parties	Date of signature	Date of entry into force
1	Myanmar - Russian Federation BIT (2025)	Signed (not in force)	Myanmar	20/06/2025	
2	State of Palestine - Russian Federation BIT (2016)	In force	State of Palestine	11/11/2016	08/11/2017
3	Morocco - Russian Federation BIT (2016)	Signed (not in force)	Morocco	15/03/2016	
4	Iran, Islamic Republic of - Russian Federation BIT (2015)	In force	Iran, Islamic Republic of	23/12/2015	06/04/2017
5	Cambodia-Russian Federation BIT (2015)	In force	Cambodia	03/03/2015	07/03/2016
6	Azerbaijan - Russian Federation BIT (2014)	In force	Azerbaijan	29/09/2014	16/11/2015
7	Bahrain - Russian Federation BIT (2014)	In force	Bahrain	29/04/2014	25/12/2015
8	Guatemala - Russian Federation BIT (2013)	Signed (not in force)	Guatemala	27/11/2013	
9	Russian Federation - Uzbekistan BIT (2013)	In force	Uzbekistan	15/04/2013	14/01/2014
10	Russian Federation - Zimbabwe BIT (2012)	In force	Zimbabwe	07/10/2012	10/09/2014
11	Nicaragua - Russian Federation BIT (2012)	In force	Nicaragua	26/01/2012	03/09/2013
12	Equatorial Guinea - Russian Federation BIT (2011)	In force	Equatorial Guinea	06/06/2011	03/03/2016
13	Russian Federation - Singapore BIT (2010)	In force	Singapore	27/09/2010	16/06/2012
14	Russian Federation - United Arab Emirates BIT (2010)	In force	United Arab Emirates	28/06/2010	19/08/2013
15	Angola - Russian Federation BIT (2009)	In force	Angola	26/06/2009	12/01/2011
16	Namibia - Russian Federation BIT (2009)	Signed (not in force)	Namibia	25/06/2009	
17	Nigeria - Russian Federation BIT (2009)	Signed (not in force)	Nigeria	24/06/2009	
18	Russian Federation - Turkmenistan BIT (2009)	In force	Turkmenistan	25/03/2009	23/08/2010
19	Russian Federation - Venezuela, Bolivarian Republic of BIT (2008)	In force	Venezuela, Bolivarian Republic of	07/11/2008	26/10/2009
20	Libya - Russian Federation BIT (2008)	In force	Libya	17/04/2008	15/10/2010
21	Indonesia - Russian Federation BIT (2007)	In force	Indonesia	06/09/2007	15/10/2009
22	Jordan - Russian Federation BIT (2007)	In force	Jordan	13/02/2007	17/06/2009
23	Qatar - Russian Federation BIT (2007)	In force	Qatar	12/02/2007	04/06/2009
24	China - Russian Federation BIT (2006)	In force	China	09/11/2006	01/05/2009
25	Algeria - Russian Federation BIT (2006)	Signed (not in force)	Algeria	10/03/2006	
26	Russian Federation - Syrian Arab Republic BIT (2005)	In force	Syrian Arab Republic	26/01/2005	13/07/2007
27	Russian Federation - Yemen BIT (2002)	In force	Yemen	17/12/2002	21/07/2005
28	Russian Federation - Thailand BIT (2002)	Signed (not in force)	Thailand	17/10/2002	
29	Armenia - Russian Federation BIT (2001)	In force	Armenia	15/09/2001	08/02/2006
30	Russian Federation - Slovenia BIT (2000)	Signed (not in force)	Slovenia	08/04/2000	
31	Ethiopia - Russian Federation BIT (2000)	Signed (not in force)	Ethiopia	10/02/2000	
32	Lithuania - Russian Federation BIT (1999)	In force	Lithuania	29/06/1999	24/05/2004
33	Russian Federation - Tajikistan BIT (1999)	Signed (not in force)	Tajikistan	16/04/1999	
34	Russian Federation - Ukraine BIT (1998)	Terminated	Ukraine	27/11/1998	27/01/2000
35	Russian Federation - South Africa BIT (1998)	In force	South Africa	23/11/1998	12/04/2000
36	Japan - Russian Federation BIT (1998)	In force	Japan	13/11/1998	27/05/2000
37	Kazakhstan - Russian Federation BIT (1998)	In force	Kazakhstan	06/07/1998	11/02/2000
38	Argentina - Russian Federation BIT (1998)	In force	Argentina	25/06/1998	20/11/2000
39	Moldova, Republic of - Russian Federation BIT (1998)	In force	Moldova, Republic of	17/03/1998	18/07/2001
40	Russian Federation - Uzbekistan BIT (1997)	Terminated	Uzbekistan	22/12/1997	
41	Russian Federation - Turkey BIT (1997)	In force	Türkiye	15/12/1997	15/05/2000
42	Macedonia, The former Yugoslav Republic of - Russian Federation BIT (1997)	In force	North Macedonia	21/10/1997	09/07/1998
43	Egypt - Russian Federation BIT (1997)	In force	Egypt	23/09/1997	12/06/2000
44	Philippines - Russian Federation BIT (1997)	Signed (not in force)	Philippines	12/09/1997	
45	Cyprus - Russian Federation BIT (1997)	Signed (not in force)	Cyprus	11/04/1997	
46	Lebanon - Russian Federation BIT (1997)	In force	Lebanon	08/04/1997	11/03/2003
47	Lao People's Democratic Republic - Russian Federation BIT (1996)	In force	Lao People's Democratic Republic	06/12/1996	22/03/2006
48	Korea, Dem. People's Rep. of - Russian Federation BIT (1996)	In force	Korea, Dem. People's Rep. of	28/11/1996	09/01/2006
49	Croatia - Russian Federation BIT (1996)	Signed (not in force)	Croatia	20/05/1996	
50	Ecuador - Russian Federation BIT (1996)	Signed (not in force)	Ecuador	25/04/1996	
51	Italy - Russian Federation BIT (1996)	In force	Italy	09/04/1996	07/07/1997
52	Mongolia - Russian Federation BIT (1995)	In force	Mongolia	29/11/1995	26/02/2006
53	Russian Federation - Yugoslavia (former) BIT (1995)	In force	Yugoslavia (former)	11/10/1995	19/07/1996
54	Russia - Serbia BIT (1995)	In force	Serbia	11/10/1995	19/07/1996
55	Norway - Russian Federation BIT (1995)	In force	Norway	04/10/1995	21/05/1998
56	Russian Federation - Sweden BIT (1995)	In force	Sweden	19/04/1995	07/07/1996
57	Albania - Russian Federation BIT (1995)	In force	Albania	11/04/1995	29/05/1996
58	Hungary - Russian Federation BIT (1995)	In force	Hungary	06/03/1995	29/05/1996
59	India - Russian Federation BIT (1994)	Terminated	India	23/12/1994	14/08/1996
60	Kuwait - Russian Federation BIT (1994)	In force	Kuwait	21/11/1994	30/05/1996
61	Portugal - Russian Federation BIT (1994)	Signed (not in force)	Portugal	21/07/1994	
62	Russian Federation - Viet Nam BIT (1994)	In force	Viet Nam	16/06/1994	03/07/1996
63	Czech Republic - Russian Federation BIT (1994)	In force	Czechia	05/04/1994	06/06/1996
64	Russian Federation - Slovakia BIT (1993)	In force	Slovakia	30/11/1993	02/08/1996
65	Denmark - Russian Federation BIT (1993)	In force	Denmark	04/11/1993	26/08/1996
66	Romania - Russian Federation BIT (1993)	In force	Romania	29/09/1993	20/07/1996
67	Cuba - Russian Federation BIT (1993)	In force	Cuba	07/07/1993	08/07/1996
68	Greece - Russian Federation BIT (1993)	In force	Greece	30/06/1993	23/02/1997
69	Bulgaria - Russian Federation BIT (1993)	In force	Bulgaria	08/06/1993	19/12/2005
70	Poland - Russian Federation BIT (1992)	Signed (not in force)	Poland	02/10/1992	
71	Russian Federation - United States of America BIT (1992)	Signed (not in force)	United States of America	17/06/1992	
72	Korea, Republic of - Russian Federation BIT (1990)	In force	Korea, Republic of	14/12/1990	10/07/1991
73	Russian Federation - Turkey BIT (1990)	Terminated	Türkiye	14/12/1990	
74	Russian Federation - Switzerland BIT (1990)	In force	Switzerland	01/12/1990	26/08/1991
75	Russian Federation - Spain BIT (1990)	In force	Spain	26/10/1990	28/11/1991
76	China - Russian Federation BIT (1990)	Terminated	China	21/07/1990	26/07/1991
77	Denmark - Russian Federation BIT (1990)	Terminated	Denmark	01/05/1990	
78	Austria - Russian Federation BIT (1990)	In force	Austria	08/02/1990	01/09/1991
79	Canada - Russian Federation BIT (1989)	In force	Canada	20/11/1989	27/06/1991
80	Netherlands - Russian Federation BIT (1989)	In force	Netherlands	05/10/1989	20/07/1991
81	France - Russian Federation BIT (1989)	In force	France	04/07/1989	18/07/1991
82	Germany - Russian Federation BIT (1989)	In force	Germany	13/06/1989	05/08/1991
83	Russian Federation - United Kingdom BIT (1989)	In force	United Kingdom	06/04/1989	03/07/1991
84	Belgium/Luxembourg - Russian Federation BIT (1989)	In force	Belgium	09/02/1989	18/08/1991
85	Belgium/Luxembourg - Russian Federation BIT (1989)	In force	Luxembourg	09/02/1989	18/08/1991
86	Finland - Russian Federation BIT (1989)	In force	Finland	08/02/1989	15/08/1991

== Treaties with Investment Provisions ==
No.	Short title	Status	Parties	Date of signature	Date of entry into force
1	Russian Federation - United Arab Emirates Services and Investment Agreement (2025)	Signed (not in force)	United Arab Emirates	08/08/2025	
2	CIS Agreement on Services and Investment (2023)	In force		08/06/2023	05/06/2024
3	Eurasian Economic Union - Viet Nam FTA (2015)	In force	Viet Nam	29/05/2015	05/10/2016
4	Treaty on the Eurasian Economic Union (2014)	In force		29/05/2014	01/01/2015
5	Belarus - Kazakhstan - Russia Agreement on Services and Investment (2010)	In force	Belarus, Kazakhstan	09/12/2010	01/01/2012
6	Eurasian Investment Agreement (2008)	In force	Belarus, Kazakhstan, Kyrgyzstan, Tajikistan	12/12/2008	11/01/2016
7	Common Economic Zone Agreement (2003)	In force	Belarus, Kazakhstan, Ukraine	19/09/2003	20/05/2004
8	EC - Russia PCA (1994)	In force	EU (European Union)	24/06/1994	01/12/1997
9	IFD Agreement	In negotiation			

== Investment Related Instruments ==
No.	Short title	Date of adoption	Level	Type
1	Russian Federation Model BIT 2016	30/09/2016	National	Model agreements
2	TRIPS	1994	Multilateral	Intergovernmental agreements
3	TRIMS	1994	Multilateral	Intergovernmental agreements
4	MIGA Convention	1985	Multilateral	Intergovernmental agreements
5	New York Convention	1958	Multilateral	Intergovernmental agreements
6	Fifth Protocol to GATS	1997	Multilateral	Intergovernmental agreements
7	Fourth Protocol to GATS	1997	Multilateral	Intergovernmental agreements
8	GATS	1994	Multilateral	Intergovernmental agreements
9	UN Code of Conduct on Transnational Corporations	1983	Multilateral	Draft instruments
10	APEC Non-Binding Investment Principles	1994	Regional/Plurilateral	Guidelines, principles, resolutions and similar
11	Doha Declaration	2001	Multilateral	Guidelines, principles, resolutions and similar
12	World Bank Investment Guidelines	1992	Multilateral	Guidelines, principles, resolutions and similar
13	ILO Tripartite Declaration on Multinational Enterprises	2000	Multilateral	Guidelines, principles, resolutions and similar
14	ILO Tripartite Declaration on Multinational Enterprises	2006	Multilateral	Guidelines, principles, resolutions and similar
15	ILO Tripartite Declaration on Multinational Enterprises	1977	Multilateral	Guidelines, principles, resolutions and similar
16	Pacific Basin Investment Charter	1995	Non-governmental	Guidelines, principles, resolutions and similar
17	Singapore Ministerial Declaration	1996	Multilateral	Guidelines, principles, resolutions and similar
18	UN Guiding Principles on Business and Human Rights	2011	Multilateral	Guidelines, principles, resolutions and similar
19	Permanent Sovereignty UN Resolution	1962	Multilateral	Guidelines, principles, resolutions and similar
20	New International Economic Order UN Resolution	1974	Multilateral	Guidelines, principles, resolutions and similar
21	Charter of Economic Rights and Duties of States	1974	Multilateral	Guidelines, principles, resolutions and similar

== See also ==
- Foreign relations of Russia
- Economy of Russia
