= Common Economic Zone Agreement =

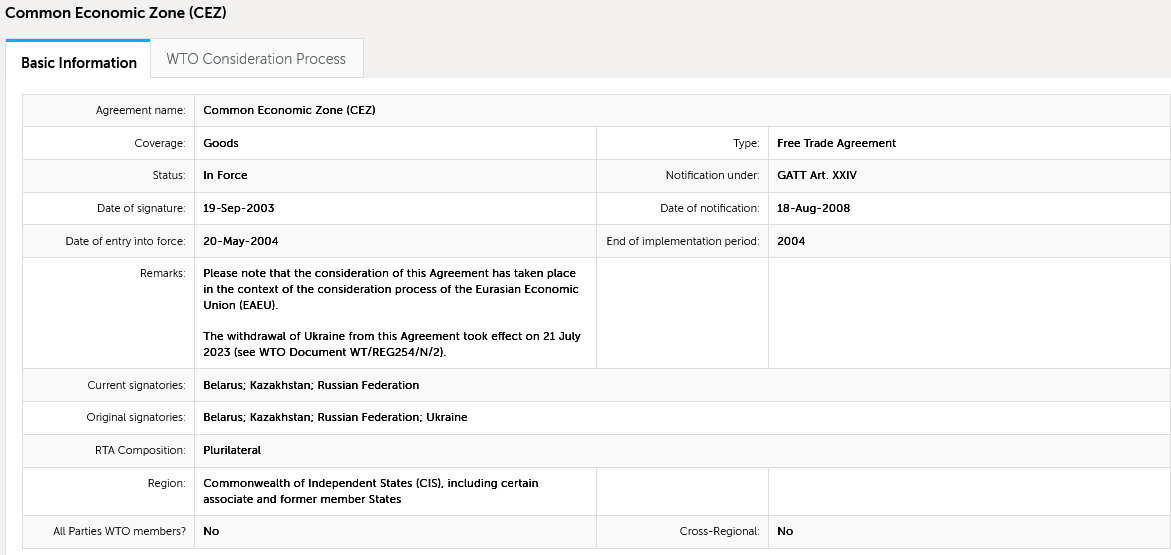
Regional Trade Agreements Database of the World Trade Organization.

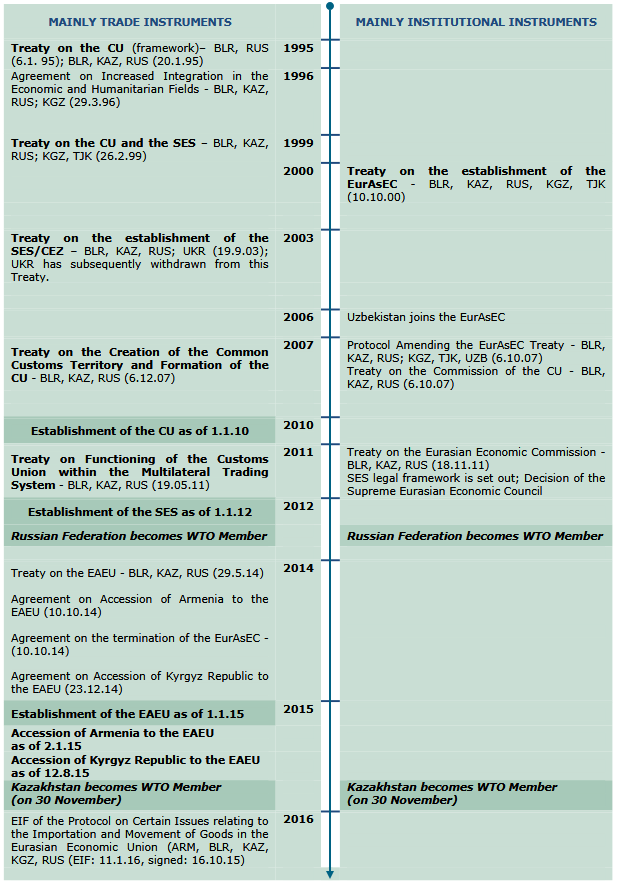
Timeline of EAEU Integration from the World Trade Organization report.

The Single Economic Space Agreement (SES) or Common Economic Zone Agreement (CEZ) is an international agreement on the intention to create conditions for the free movement of goods, services, capital and labor (single market) without the creation of supranational bodies, signed on 19 September 2003 by Belarus, Kazakhstan, the Russian Federation and Ukraine. The Depositary is the Government of Kazakhstan and the Agreement is outside of the CIS. Initially this project was a separate one, but in June 2006, the implementation of this project was incorporated into the Eurasian Economic Community.

The Single Economic Space would involve a supranational commission on trade and tariffs that would be based in Kiev, would initially be headed by a representative of Kazakhstan, and would not be subordinate to the governments of the four nations. The ultimate goal would be a regional organisation that would be open for other countries to join as well, and could eventually lead even to a single currency.

On 22 May 2003 The Verkhovna Rada (the Ukrainian Parliament) voted 266 votes in favour and 51 against the Single economic space. However, most believe that Viktor Yushchenko's victory in the Ukrainian presidential election of 2004 was a significant blow against the project: Yushchenko has shown renewed interest in Ukrainian membership in the European Union, and such membership would be incompatible with the envisioned Single economic space.

According to Regional Trade Agreements Database of the World Trade Organization, this agreement was signed on 19 September 2003, entered into force on 20 May 2004 and is "In Force" as of 2024. The withdrawal of Ukraine from this Agreement took effect on 21 July 2023 (see WTO Document WT/REG254/N/2). It was Ukraine that notified the World Trade Organization of its participation in the agreement on August 18, 2008.

== Declaration and High Level Group ==
As stated on the website of the Ministry of Economy of Ukraine as of 2004, in Moscow on 23 February 2003, during a meeting of the Presidents of the Republic of Belarus, the Republic of Kazakhstan, the Russian Federation and Ukraine, the Presidents of the above countries declared a new stage of economic integration, the formation of a Single Economic Space. The ultimate goal of work in this area of cooperation, according to the Statement, is the establishment of the Regional Integration Organization. To this end, the Parties established a joint High Level Group (HLG) and approved its mandate. According to the Protocol of the first meeting of the HLG on 6 March 2003, the Agreement on the formation of the SES was to provide for

- a free trade area without exemptions and restrictions, without the use of anti-dumping, countervailing and special protective measures in mutual trade based on uniform rules of competition and the use of subsidies;
- creating legal conditions for the unimpeded movement of goods, services, capital and labor;
- pursuing a coordinated policy in the field of tariff and non-tariff regulation, the formation of the Customs Union and the transfer of powers in this area to a single regulatory interstate independent Commission on Trade and Tariffs.

== Agreement on the Formation of the Single Economic Space ==
On 19 September 2003 in Yalta, during the Summit of the CIS Heads of State, the Presidents of the Republic of Belarus, the Republic of Kazakhstan, the Russian Federation and Ukraine signed the Agreement on the Formation of the Single Economic Space. On 20 April 2004, the Verkhovna Rada of Ukraine ratified the Agreement on the Formation of the Single Economic Space, and in accordance with the reservation made during the ratification, Ukraine will participate in the formation and functioning of the Single Economic Space within the limits consistent with the Constitution of Ukraine (Law of Ukraine on Ratification of the Agreement on the Formation of the Single Economic Space dated 20 April 2004 No. 1683-IV).

The Agreement also provides for the possibility of multi-speed and multi-format progress of the participating states on the way to integration into this regional integration organization.

In accordance with the Statement of the Presidents of the Republic of Belarus, the Republic of Kazakhstan, the Russian Federation and Ukraine on 19 September 2003, the mandate of the High Level Group was extended.

On the website of the Ministry of Economy of Ukraine on the page about the SES was published a list of documents, including the List of basic international legal documents on the formation of the SES, 14 international legal and other documents to be agreed as a priority, as well as 29 proposals for documents.

== Under Yushchenko ==
As stated on the website of the Ministry of Economy of Ukraine in 2006, on 27 August 2005, the first Summit of Heads of State of the countries participating in the Agreement on the Formation of the Single Economic Space (SES) was held in Kazan after the election of the new President of Ukraine Viktor Yushchenko. Its main significance is that at the highest political level a clear position of Ukraine on the format of its participation in the SES was stated. Ukraine will continue to participate in the preparation of international legal documents that form the legal framework of the SES, but will use the principle of multi-level and multi-speed integration, taking into account the WTO rules and regulations, as provided for in the Agreement on the Formation of the SES of 19 September 2003. In other words, the list of agreements and treaties in which Ukraine will participate within the SES will be determined in stages, based on Ukraine's interests in joining the WTO and taking into account the country's European integration course. At the same time, the decision taken by the four states to accelerate economic development within the SES is in Ukraine's interest. On 3 February 2006, Astana hosted the 24th meeting of the High Level Group on the formation of the Single Economic Space, chaired by Minister of Economy Arseniy Yatsenyuk.

With the revival of the Eurasian Economic Community in 2005 there is a possibility for the "common economic space" agenda to be implemented in its framework of a Union of Russia and Belarus with or without the participation of Ukraine. This was confirmed in August 2006 and in October 2007 it was announced that a customs union would be formed by Russia, Belarus, and Kazakhstan by 2011 with other members being able to join later.

== Developments without Ukraine ==
In 2007, Belarus, Kazakhstan and Russia signed an agreement to create a Customs Union between the three countries. The Customs Union of Belarus, Kazakhstan and Russia came into existence on 1 January 2010.

On 1 January 2012, the three states established the Single Economic Space which ensures a single market for goods, services, capital and labour.

== Under Yanukovych ==
In 2011, President Viktor Yanukovych proposed that Ukraine cooperate with the EurAsEC Customs Union under a 3+1 format and suggested "signing a framework agreement now and then supplementing it with specific provisions". This approach would allow Ukraine to continue its independent policy toward third countries and maintain its independence in concluding free trade agreements with third countries.

== Under Zelensky ==
Under Volodymyr Zelenskyy, according to Regional Trade Agreements Database of the World Trade Organization, the withdrawal of Ukraine from this Agreement took effect on 21 July 2023 (see WTO Document WT/REG254/N/2).

== See also ==
- Eurasian Economic Community
- Commonwealth of Independent States Agreement on the Establishment of a Free Trade Area
- Commonwealth of Independent States Free Trade Area
- Commonwealth of Independent States Agreement on Free Trade in Services, Establishment, Operations and Investment
- Single Economic Space of the Eurasian Economic Union
- Free trade areas in Europe
