= Multi-speed integration =

Form of regional integration

Multi-speed integration (Multi-level or a la carte integration) refers to an integration community where participants independently choose to advance to different levels of integration, resulting in varying degrees of integration among members (including Economic integration).

Multi-speed Europe and Differentiated integration approaches are discussed in the framework of European integration. In the context of European integration, the four freedoms are considered to be inseparable and inviolable. Countries hoping to share in the free movement of goods, services and capital must accept the free movement of labour as well. The European Union's chief Brexit negotiator Michel Barnier said the bloc was prepared to offer Britain an unprecedentedly close relationship after it quits the EU, but it would not permit anything that weakened the body's single market: "Single market means single market ... There is no single market a la carte."

Multi-speed integration is proposed in Mercosur.

Multi-speed integration was envisaged by the Treaty on the formation of a single economic space of Ukraine, Russia, Belarus and Kazakhstan.

In 2007, a scientific article evaluated the legal framework for free trade in the post-Soviet space as a particular blend of "à la carte multilateralism" and "multiple bilateralism". "Both the bilateral and the multilateral regimes have undergone significant (often underestimated) development, and that the multilateral regime has generally sought to be more ambitious both in its substantive and institutional reach. Yet, both regimes can be described as ultimately weak and their overlap confusing. While a higher juridicization and comprehensive consolidation at the multilateral level of the CIS free trade regime may be recommended." it said. After the conclusion of the Agreement on free trade in services by Russia, Armenia, Belarus, Kyrgyzstan, Kazakhstan, Tajikistan and Uzbekistan, the Information and Analytical Department of the CIS Executive Committee notes in October 2023 that at the moment a kind of pyramid of integration entities has developed in the CIS countries, differing in the depth of economic integration, and the implementation of free trade agreements and a number of other documents will lead to the formation of a full-fledged common economic space within the Commonwealth. Within its participant countries, state borders will cease to be an obstacle to the free movement of goods, services, labor and capital.

The Union State of Russia and Belarus is described as the integration core within the Eurasian Economic Union and post-Soviet economic integration.

== See also ==
- Four Economic Freedoms
- Regional integration
- Federalisation of the European Union#Multi-speed integration
- Member state of the European Union#Multi-speed integration
- Benelux
- Nordic Passport Union
