= International Investment Agreements of Kyrgyzstan =

Kyrgyzstan has concluded the following Bilateral Investment Treaties (BITs), Treaties with Investment Provisions (TIPs) and Investment Related Instruments (IRIs) according to the database of UNCTAD.

== Overview ==
International organizations such as the World Trade Organization periodically evaluate developments in trade and investment, trends and patterns in FDI and the investment regime for a particular country.

The U.S. government also periodically assesses investment conditions, openness to foreign investment, policies toward foreign direct investment, investment and tax treaties and trade facilitation measures.

== Bilateral Investment Treaties ==
No.	Short title	Status	Parties	Date of signature	Date of entry into force
1	Kazakhstan-Kyrgyzstan BIT (2024)	Signed (not in force)	Kazakhstan	24/04/2024	
2	Hungary - Kyrgyzstan BIT (2020)	In force	Hungary	29/09/2020	10/04/2022
3	India - Kyrgyzstan BIT (2019)	In force	India	14/06/2019	05/06/2025
4	Kyrgyzstan - Turkey BIT (2018)	In force	Türkiye	09/04/2018	18/03/2020
5	Georgia - Kyrgyzstan BIT (2016)	Signed (not in force)	Georgia	13/10/2016	
6	Austria - Kyrgyzstan BIT (2016)	In force	Austria	22/04/2016	01/10/2017
7	Kuwait - Kyrgyzstan BIT (2015)	Signed (not in force)	Kuwait	13/12/2015	
8	Kyrgyzstan - Qatar BIT (2014)	Signed (not in force)	Qatar	08/12/2014	
9	Kyrgyzstan - United Arab Emirates BIT (2014)	In force	United Arab Emirates	07/12/2014	05/01/2016
10	Kyrgyzstan - Latvia BIT (2008)	In force	Latvia	22/05/2008	11/02/2009
11	Kyrgyzstan - Lithuania BIT (2008)	In force	Lithuania	15/05/2008	20/02/2009
12	Korea, Republic of - Kyrgyzstan BIT (2007)	In force	Korea, Republic of	19/11/2007	08/07/2008
13	Finland - Kyrgyzstan BIT (2003)	In force	Finland	03/04/2003	08/12/2004
14	Kyrgyzstan - Moldova, Republic of BIT (2002)	In force	Moldova, Republic of	07/11/2002	16/01/2004
15	Kyrgyzstan - Sweden BIT (2002)	In force	Sweden	08/03/2002	01/04/2003
16	Denmark - Kyrgyzstan BIT (2001)	Signed (not in force)	Denmark	01/01/2001	
17	Kyrgyzstan - Tajikistan BIT (2000)	In force	Tajikistan	19/01/2000	20/11/2001
18	Kyrgyzstan - Mongolia BIT (1999)	In force	Mongolia	05/12/1999	10/07/2001
19	Belarus - Kyrgyzstan BIT (1999)	In force	Belarus	30/03/1999	11/11/2001
20	Kyrgyzstan - Switzerland BIT (1999)	In force	Switzerland	29/01/1999	17/04/2003
21	Germany - Kyrgyzstan BIT (1997)	In force	Germany	28/08/1997	16/04/2006
22	Azerbaijan - Kyrgyzstan BIT (1997)	In force	Azerbaijan	28/08/1997	28/08/1997
23	India - Kyrgyzstan BIT (1997)	Terminated	India	16/05/1997	12/05/2000
24	Georgia - Kyrgyzstan BIT (1997)	In force	Georgia	22/04/1997	28/10/1997
25	Kazakhstan - Kyrgyzstan BIT (1997)	In force	Kazakhstan	08/04/1997	01/05/2005
26	Kyrgyzstan - Uzbekistan BIT (1996)	In force	Uzbekistan	24/12/1996	06/02/1997
27	Iran, Islamic Republic of - Kyrgyzstan BIT (1996)	In force	Iran, Islamic Republic of	31/07/1996	27/06/2005
28	Kyrgyzstan - Pakistan BIT (1995)	Signed (not in force)	Pakistan	26/08/1995	
29	Kyrgyzstan - Malaysia BIT (1995)	Signed (not in force)	Malaysia	20/07/1995	
30	Indonesia - Kyrgyzstan BIT (1995)	Terminated	Indonesia	19/07/1995	19/05/1998
31	Kyrgyzstan - United Kingdom BIT (1994)	In force	United Kingdom	08/12/1994	18/06/1998
32	Armenia - Kyrgyzstan BIT (1994)	In force	Armenia	04/07/1994	26/11/1995
33	France - Kyrgyzstan BIT (1994)	In force	France	02/06/1994	10/08/1997
34	Kyrgyzstan - Ukraine BIT (1993)	Signed (not in force)	Ukraine	23/02/1993	
35	Kyrgyzstan - United States of America BIT (1993)	In force	United States of America	19/01/1993	12/01/1994
36	China - Kyrgyzstan BIT (1992)	In force	China	14/05/1992	08/09/1995
37	Kyrgyzstan - Turkey BIT (1992)	Terminated	Türkiye	28/04/1992	31/10/1996
38	Kyrgyzstan - Spain BIT (1990)	In force	Spain	26/10/1990	28/11/1991
39	Belgium/Luxembourg - Kyrgyzstan BIT (1989)	In force	Belgium	09/02/1989	18/08/1991

== Treaties with Investment Provisions ==
No.	Short title	Status	Parties	Date of signature	Date of entry into force
1	EU - Kyrgyzstan EPCA (2024)	Signed (not in force)	EU (European Union)	25/06/2024	
2	CIS Agreement on Services and Investment (2023)	In force		08/06/2023	05/06/2024
3	Eurasian Economic Union - Viet Nam FTA (2015)	In force	Viet Nam	29/05/2015	05/10/2016
4	Treaty on the Eurasian Economic Union (2014)	In force		29/05/2014	01/01/2015
5	Eurasian Investment Agreement (2008)	In force	Belarus, Kazakhstan, Russian Federation, Tajikistan	12/12/2008	11/01/2016
6	ECO Investment Agreement (2005)	Signed (not in force)		07/07/2005	
7	US - Central Asia TIFA (2004)	In force	Kazakhstan, Tajikistan, Turkmenistan, United States of America, Uzbekistan	01/06/2004	01/06/2004
8	CIS Investor Rights Convention (1997)	In force	Armenia, Belarus, Kazakhstan, Moldova, Republic of, Tajikistan	28/03/1997	21/01/1999
9	EC - Kyrgyzstan Cooperation Agreement (1995)	In force	EU (European Union)	09/02/1995	01/07/1999
10	The Energy Charter Treaty (1994)	In force		17/12/1994	16/04/1998
11	IFD Agreement	In negotiation			

== Investment Related Instruments ==
No.	Short title	Date of adoption	Level	Type
1	TRIPS	1994	Multilateral	Intergovernmental agreements
2	TRIMS	1994	Multilateral	Intergovernmental agreements
3	Islamic Corporation for the Insurance of Investment Credit	1992	Regional/Plurilateral	Intergovernmental agreements
4	MIGA Convention	1985	Multilateral	Intergovernmental agreements
5	New York Convention	1958	Multilateral	Intergovernmental agreements
6	Fifth Protocol to GATS	1997	Multilateral	Intergovernmental agreements
7	Fourth Protocol to GATS	1997	Multilateral	Intergovernmental agreements
8	GATS	1994	Multilateral	Intergovernmental agreements
9	Draft Supplementary Treaty to the Energy Charter Treaty	1998	Regional/Plurilateral	Draft instruments
10	UN Code of Conduct on Transnational Corporations	1983	Multilateral	Draft instruments
11	Doha Declaration	2001	Multilateral	Guidelines, principles, resolutions and similar
12	World Bank Investment Guidelines	1992	Multilateral	Guidelines, principles, resolutions and similar
13	ILO Tripartite Declaration on Multinational Enterprises	2000	Multilateral	Guidelines, principles, resolutions and similar
14	ILO Tripartite Declaration on Multinational Enterprises	2006	Multilateral	Guidelines, principles, resolutions and similar
15	ILO Tripartite Declaration on Multinational Enterprises	1977	Multilateral	Guidelines, principles, resolutions and similar
16	Singapore Ministerial Declaration	1996	Multilateral	Guidelines, principles, resolutions and similar
17	UN Guiding Principles on Business and Human Rights	2011	Multilateral	Guidelines, principles, resolutions and similar
18	Permanent Sovereignty UN Resolution	1962	Multilateral	Guidelines, principles, resolutions and similar
19	New International Economic Order UN Resolution	1974	Multilateral	Guidelines, principles, resolutions and similar
20	Charter of Economic Rights and Duties of States	1974	Multilateral	Guidelines, principles, resolutions and similar

== See also ==
- Foreign relations of Kyrgyzstan
- Economy of Kyrgyzstan
