= Free trade areas in Europe =

EU, EFTA, CEFTA, CISFTA, GUAM, BAFTA

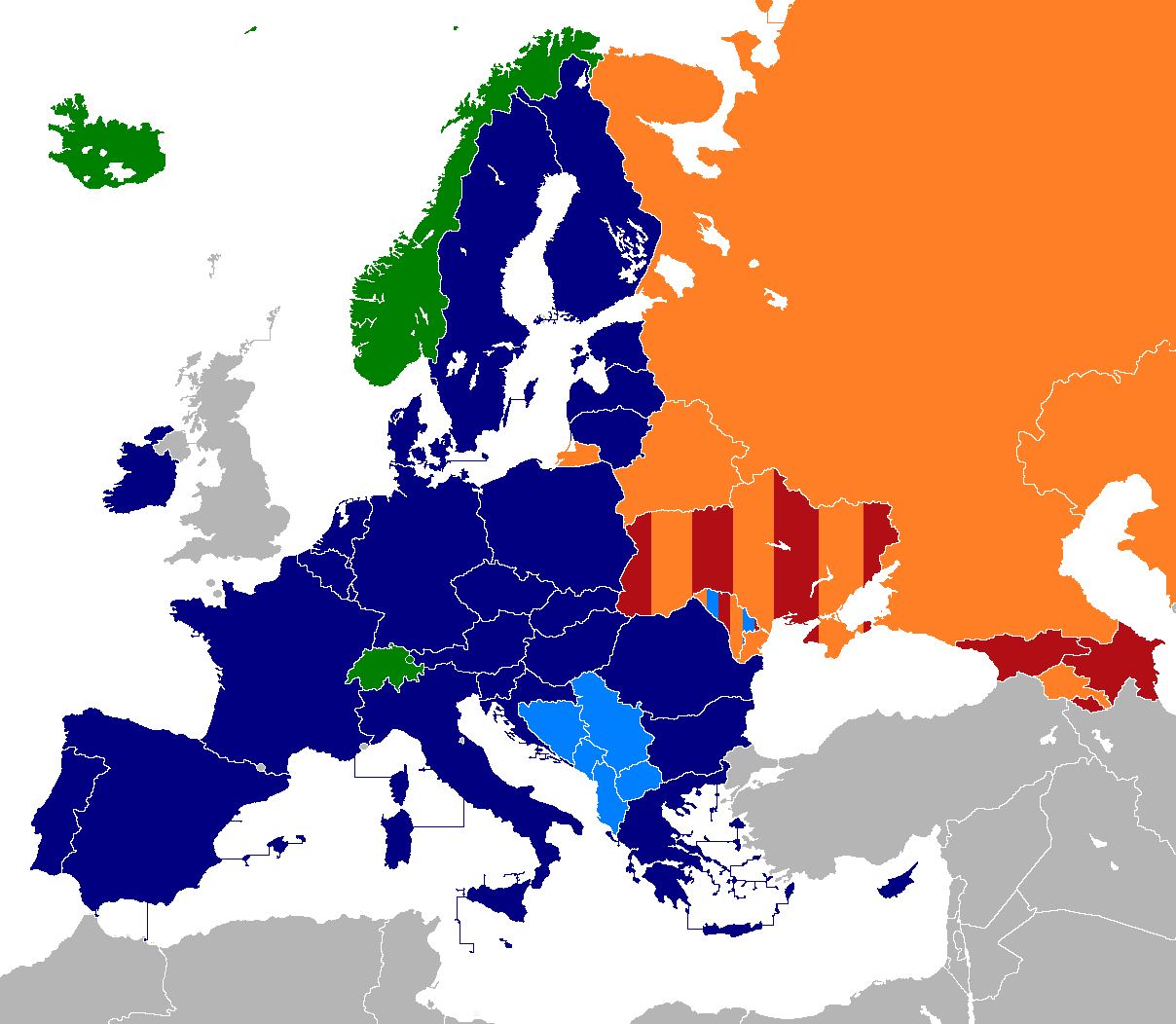
EU EFTA CEFTA CIS FTA (differs from the also multi-lateral EAEU Eurasian Economic Space) GUAM (not ratified and not in force)

At present, there are six multi-lateral free trade areas in Europe, and one former free trade area in recent history. Note that there are also a number of bilateral free trade agreements between states and between trade blocks; and that some states participate in more than one free trade area.

== EU ==
EU Single Market
EU member states
Non-EU participants

EU Customs Union
EU member states
Non-EU participants

The European Union (EU) has always operated as more than a free trade area with its predecessor, the European Economic Community (EEC) being founded as a customs union. The EU has free trade agreements to varying levels with most other European countries.

EU Single Market

The EU shares its single market with three EFTA members via the European Economic Area agreement, and the remaining EFTA member—Switzerland—via bilateral agreements.

EU Customs Union

The European Union Customs Union is a customs union which consists of all the member states of the European Union and Turkey, San Marino, Monaco, Andorra and the UK territory of Akrotiri and Dhekelia which are outside of the EU. In addition to allowing for free trade between states, the customs union imposes a common external tariff on all goods entering the area.

== EFTA ==
EFTA (current) former EFTA (joined EU) CEFTA (current) former CEFTA (joined EU) former BAFTA (joined EU)

The European Free Trade Association (EFTA) was created in 1960 by the outer seven (as a looser alternative to the then-European Communities) but most of its membership has since joined the Communities/EU leaving only four countries (Iceland, Norway, Switzerland and Liechtenstein) still party to the treaty. The United Kingdom is the only former EFTA member which is not currently part of the EU, following its withdrawal in 2020.

== CEFTA ==
Following the fall of the Iron Curtain, two free trade areas were created in Central Europe, the Baltic Free Trade Area (BAFTA) and the Central European Free Trade Agreement (CEFTA), in order to stabilise these countries for membership of the EU. With the 2004 EU enlargement, the original members of both of these have left these agreements and joined the EU.

CEFTA has expanded into southern Europe with members from the Western Balkans and Moldova. All of the new CEFTA countries are prospective members of the EU and hence EFTA is the only free trade area with a long-term future, as there are no immediate plans for these countries to change their present status. However, CEFTA may gain new members in the form of countries neighbouring the present EU.

== EAEU Eurasian Economic Space ==
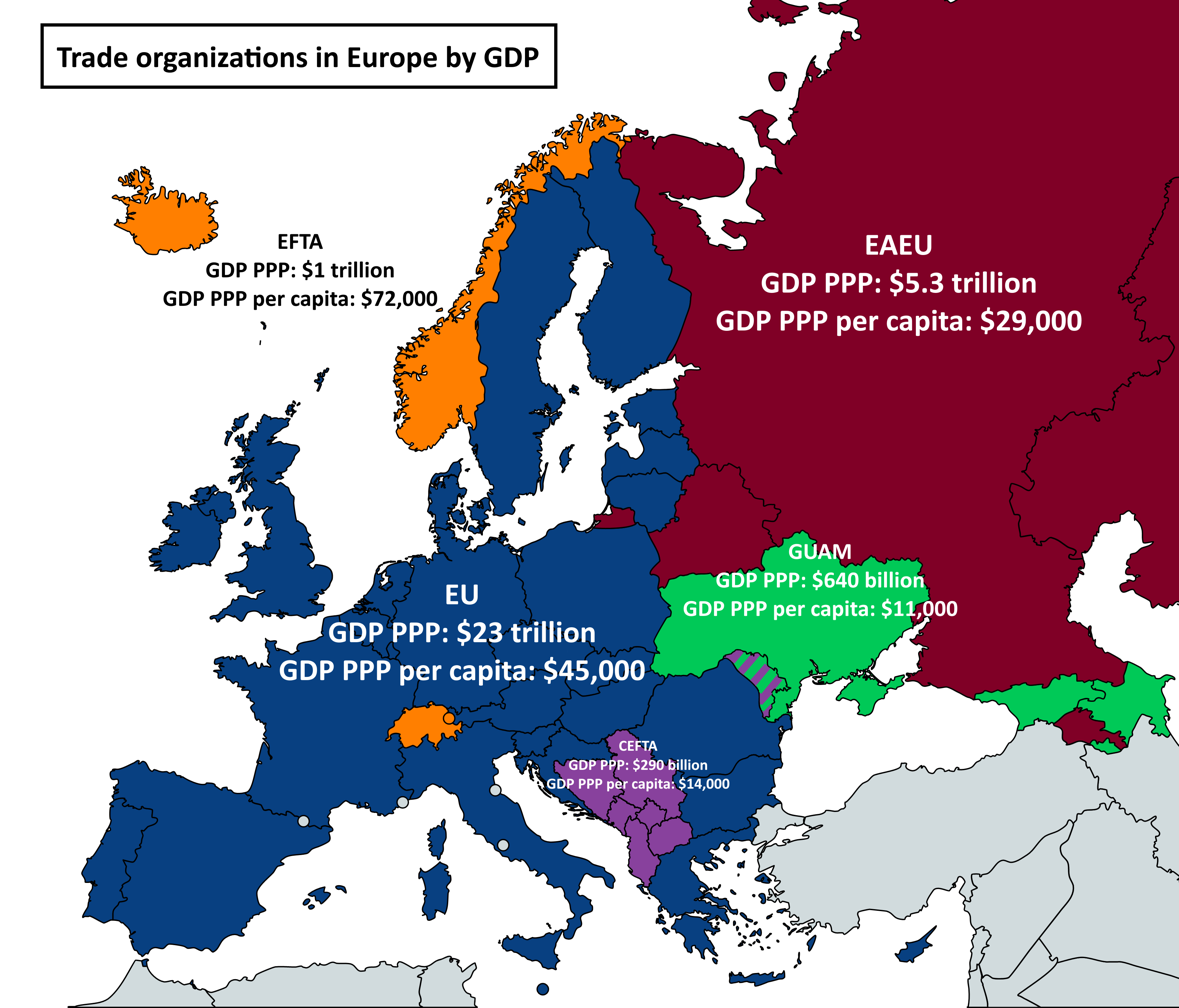
Trade organizations in Europe by GDP. The GUAM FTA has not been ratified and has not entered into force, but Ukraine and Moldova are members of the multilateral CIS FTA. The UK is not a member of the EU.

On 10 October 2000, in Astana, the heads of Belarus, Kazakhstan, Russia, Tajikistan and Kyrgyzstan signed the Treaty on the Establishment of the Eurasian Economic Community (entered into force on 30 May 2001), which called for the creation of a free trade regime among members.

In 2005, the Organization of Central Asian Cooperation (OCAC), an international organization that existed from 2002 to 2005, which aimed, among other things, to create a free trade area, whose members included Kazakhstan, Kyrgyzstan, Tajikistan, Uzbekistan and Russia, was merged into the Eurasian Economic Community. In 2008, Uzbekistan withdrew from the Eurasian Economic Community.

EurAsEC Single Economic Space

On 23 February 2003 the presidents of Russia, Kazakhstan, Belarus and Ukraine declared their intention to form a Single Economic Space, and on 19 September 2003 they signed an agreement of intent to guarantee four economic freedoms, including a free trade area. This agreement was named "Common Economic Zone" (CEZ) among Belarus, Kazakhstan, the Russian Federation and Ukraine in the WTO's Regional Trade Agreements Information System. In June 2006, this project was incorporated into the Eurasian Economic Community.

In August 2006, the Eurasian Economic Community decided on the establishment of the Customs Union between the three willing states - Belarus, Russia and Kazakhstan. Ukraine's position was to create a free trade area without restrictions and exemptions and conditions for the movement of capital, services and labor, but without devaluing its fiscal, customs and budgetary sovereignty and creating any supranational bodies.

In 2009, supranational integration bodies began their work. In Belarus, Russia and Kazakhstan, the Customs Union entered into force in July 2010, and the Single Economic Space, which provides for a free trade regime, entered into force on 1 January 2012.

EAEU Eurasian Economic Space

EurAsEC Single Economic Space was superseded by the Eurasian Economic Space of the Eurasian Economic Union established by Belarus, Kazakhstan, and Russia on 1 January 2015. The current members of the EAEU are Armenia, Belarus, Kazakhstan, Kyrgyzstan and Russia.

The EAEU is designated as "Plurilateral" Agreement by the WTO's Regional Trade Agreements Information System

== 1999 Protocol for amending 1994 CIS FTA Agreement ==
1994 Framework for bilateral agreements and Freedom of Transit

On 15 April 1994, at a meeting of the Commonwealth of Independent States (CIS) Council of Heads of State in Moscow, the presidents of 12 countries, namely Armenia, Azerbaijan, Belarus, Georgia, Kazakhstan, Kyrgyzstan, Moldova, Russia, Tajikistan, Turkmenistan, Uzbekistan and Ukraine signed an Agreement on the Establishment of a Free Trade Area (Соглашение о создании зоны свободной торговли). The Agreement entered into force on 30 December 1994 for those countries that had completed ratification. As of 2023, the Agreement is fully in force for Armenia, Azerbaijan, Belarus, Georgia, Kazakhstan, Kyrgyzstan, Moldova, Tajikistan, Uzbekistan and Ukraine, while Russia and Turkmenistan have notified the application of the Agreement on a provisional basis. According to the executive committee of the Commonwealth of Independent States, no one has ceased participation in the Agreement, made reservations or suspended the application.

The terms of the FTA allow member states to enter into the FTA agreements with other countries, as well as to join/create custom unions. Like other Commonwealth of Independent States agreements, this agreement does not regulate relations with third countries and allows differentiated integration (a.k.a. à la carte and multi-speed Europe).

1999 Protocol introducing a multilateral free trade area

On 2 April 1999, in Moscow, the presidents of 11 countries, namely Armenia, Azerbaijan, Belarus, Georgia, Kazakhstan, Kyrgyzstan, Moldova, Russia, Tajikistan, Uzbekistan and Ukraine signed a Protocol on Amendments and Additions to the Agreement on the Establishment of a Free Trade Area of 15 April 1994 (Протокол о внесении изменений и дополнений в Соглашение о создании зоны свободной торговли от 15 апреля 1994 года). Turkmenistan did not participate. The Protocol entered into force on 24 November 1999 for those countries that had completed ratification. As of 2023, the Protocol has entered into force for all countries, namely Armenia, Azerbaijan, Belarus, Georgia, Kazakhstan, Kyrgyzstan, Moldova, Tajikistan, Uzbekistan and Ukraine, except Russia, which remains a signatory but has not notified entry into force or provisional application. According to the executive committee of the Commonwealth of Independent States, no one has ceased participation in the Protocol or suspended the application, while 1 reservation was made by Azerbaijan on non-application in relation to Armenia and 2 specific opinions were expressed by Georgia and Ukraine.

Application between Azerbaijan, Georgia, Turkmenistan, Uzbekistan and the rest of the participants

The 2011 CIS FTA Treaty envisages that the 1994 agreement and the 1999 protocol no longer apply between its 8 participants (Russia, Ukraine, Belarus, Kazakhstan, Kyrgyzstan, Tajikistan, Armenia and Moldova), however, among the rest of the countries, they continue to be applied.

International Trade Centre says the 1994 Agreement on the Establishment of a Free Trade Area signed by 12 CIS countries still continues to be used by Azerbaijan and Georgia in trade with other CIS countries except with Russia and Turkmenistan. Reportedly it is also used bilaterally between Uzbekistan and Tajikistan pending Tajikistan's ratification of Uzbekistan's accession to the 2011 CIS Free Trade Area Treaty.

The WTO's Regional Trade Agreements Information System indicates Azerbaijan, Georgia, Turkmenistan and Uzbekistan as "Current signatories" and the Agreement is designated as "Plurilateral".

== 2011 CIS FTA Treaty ==
CIS Free Trade Area

The Commonwealth of Independent States had been negotiating a CIS multi-lateral free trade area since 1994 and in 2011 eight countries agreed to create a free trade area. These are; Russia, Ukraine, Belarus, Kazakhstan, Kyrgyzstan, Tajikistan, Armenia and Moldova. In addition, Belarus, Kazakhstan, Russia, Armenia, and Kyrgyzstan form the Eurasian Economic Union, including a customs union and a single market.

On 20 September 2012 the Free Trade Area Treaty (Договор о зоне свободной торговли) of the Commonwealth of Independent States signed in St Petersburg on 18 October 2011 (the "CIS FTA") came into force for Russia, Belarus and Ukraine after completion of ratification.

In 2013, the protocol on the application of the CIS FTA between Uzbekistan and the CIS FTA member states was signed as a bilateral document and without any reservations to the CIS FTA agreement. It entered into force in 2014. The Protocol on the application of the Treaty to Uzbekistan was signed by Armenia, Belarus, Kazakhstan, Kyrgyzstan, Moldova, Russia, Tajikistan, Uzbekistan and Ukraine, but entered into force for all countries except Tajikistan.

In 2016, Russia and Ukraine have suspended the agreement with respect to each other. For Ukraine, this is the only multilateral FTA in which it participates (the DCFTA with the European Union is a de jure bilateral agreement).

The Treaty is designated as "Plurilateral" by the WTO's Regional Trade Agreements Information System.

== GUAM FTA ==
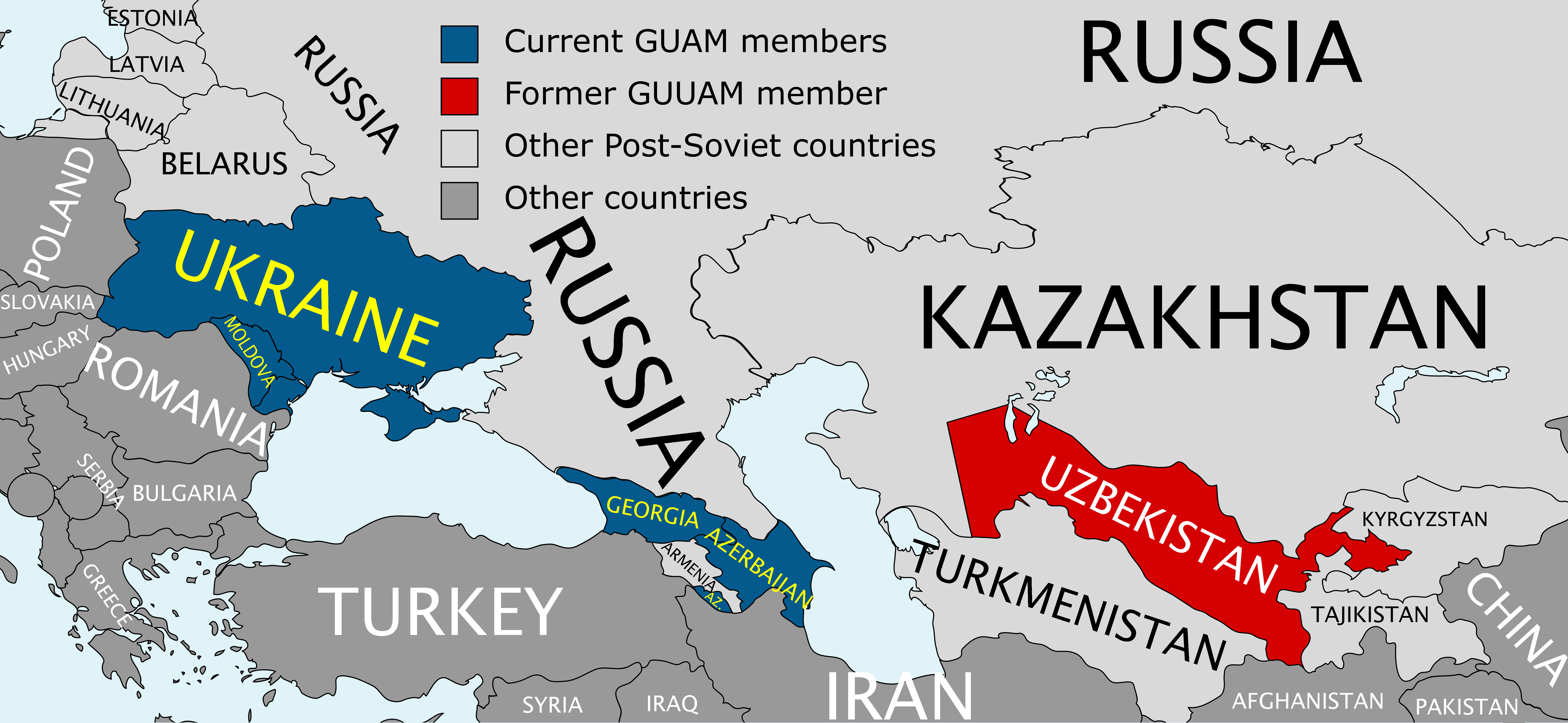
GUAM

The GUAM Organization for Democracy and Economic Development is a regional organization established in 1997 and free-trade area in Eastern Europe composed of Georgia, Azerbaijan, Ukraine, and Moldova.

The agreement on a Free Trade Area was signed in 2002. In 2017, additional agreements on a free-trade area were announced, but as of 2022 reportedly the FTA has not been ratified and has not entered into force.

The WTO was notified only in 2017 and the Agreement is designated as "Plurilateral" and "In Force". According to the WTO database, the GUAM FTA agreement was signed in 2002 and entered into force in 2003. International Trade Centre says there is no free trade area in operation with distinct rules from an Agreement on Creation of CIS Free Trade Area, was signed on 15 April 1994 by 12 CIS countries. The database of agreements of the International Trade Centre does not indicate that a GUAM FTA agreement has been concluded, but it does indicate that the 1994 Agreement on CIS FTA is in force for Georgia, Ukraine, Azerbaijan and Moldova. and the 1999 Agreement on CIS FTA version is listed as the current text of the FTA agreement.

== Proposed ==
=== Economic Cooperation Organization FTA ===
The Economic Cooperation Organization Trade Agreement or ECOTA is a preferential trade agreement reached on 17 July 2003 at the ECO summit in Islamabad whereby a preferential trade region was formed between the countries of Afghanistan, Azerbaijan, Iran, Kazakhstan, Kyrgyzstan, Pakistan, Tajikistan, Turkey, Turkmenistan and Uzbekistan. As of 2008, the ECOTA is in effect. According to the document ECO Vision 2025, the scope of ECOTA will be expanded from preferential trade to a free trade agreement.

== Historical ==
=== BAFTA ===
Baltic Free Trade Area

The Baltic Free Trade Area was a free trade agreement between Estonia, Latvia and Lithuania that existed between 1994 and 2004.

BAFTA was created to help prepare the countries for their accession to the EU. Hence, BAFTA was created more as an initiative of the EU than out of a desire for Baltic states to trade between themselves: they were more interested in gaining access to the rest of the European markets.

BAFTA's agreement was signed by the three states on 13 September 1993 and came into force on 1 April 1994. On 1 January 1997 the agreement was extended to cover trade in agricultural produce. On 1 May 2004, all three states joined the European Union, and BAFTA ceased to exist.

BAFTA was part of general co-operation between the three countries under the Baltic Assembly—modelled on Nordic co-operation (see Nordic Council). As well as the free trade area, they formed a common visa area. Leaders continue to meet regularly, however the assembly now focuses on international issues, including economic development, and military co-operation due to the proximity of Russia.

== See also ==
- List of free trade agreements
- List of free economic zones
- List of bilateral free trade agreements
  - European Union free trade agreements
- Inner Six/Outer Seven
- Eurasian Economic Union
- European integration
