= Four economic freedoms =

Free movement of goods, services, capital and labour

The four economic freedoms stand for the free movement of goods, services, capital and people/labor, which are necessary for the functioning of a single market or common market.

A common market removes all barriers to the mobility of people, capital and other resources within the area.

== Components ==
- Free movement of goods
- Free movement of services
- Free movement of capital
- Free movement of people and labor

== Projects ==
=== CIS ===
After the conclusion of the Agreement on free trade in services, the Information and Analytical Department of the CIS Executive Committee notes in October 2023 that at the moment a kind of pyramid of integration entities has developed in the CIS countries, differing in the depth of economic integration (multi-speed integration), and the implementation of free trade agreements and a number of other documents will lead to the formation of a full-fledged common economic space within the Commonwealth. Within its participant countries, state borders will cease to be an obstacle to the free movement of goods, services, labor and capital.

=== EAEU ===
The Eurasian Economic Union (EAEU) provides for free movement of goods, services, capital and labor. Fixed in the Treaty on the EAEU the principle of «four freedoms» as a fundamental principle of the functioning of the internal market enshrined the refusal to apply protective measures of the domestic market in mutual trade. In discussion and operations, the concept of "four freedoms" is widely used to describe the point of the documents.

=== EU ===
Established in 1993, the EU single market is one of the greatest achievements of the European Union. It guarantees that goods, services, people and capital can move freely throughout the territory of the EU: the ‘four freedoms’. In the context of European integration, these four freedoms are considered to be inseparable and inviolable. Countries hoping to share in the free movement of goods, services and capital must accept the free movement of labour as well.

== See also ==
- Single market
- Economic union
- Economic integration
- Regional integration
- Multi-speed integration
