= Multi-speed Europe =

Political idea

Multi-speed Europe or two-speed Europe is the idea that different parts of the European Union should integrate at different levels and pace depending on the political situation in each individual country. Indeed, multi-speed Europe is currently a reality, with only a subset of EU countries being members of the Eurozone and of the Schengen Area. Differentiated integration has long constituted a structural feature of the European Union’s development. Historically, the EU has employed multiple modalities of flexible participation across diverse policy domains. Crucially, differentiated integration should not be understood solely as an internal organizational matter: the institutional configuration of the Union and the dynamics among its member states directly influence the EU’s capacity and behavior as an external actor. Consequently, various forms of differentiation manifest not only within the EU’s internal governance but also across its external policies and international engagements. Multi-speed Europe arguably aims to salvage the "widening and deepening of the European Union" in the face of political opposition.

== Reasons and actuality of the concept ==
The concept entered political discourse when, after the end of the Cold War, an eastward enlargement of the European Union began to materialise and the question arose how "widening" could be made compatible with "deepening", i.e., how the imminent enlargement process could be prevented from diluting the idea of an "ever closer union among the peoples of Europe", as the Treaty establishing the European Economic Community of 1957 had put it. In 1994 – still at a time of the EU12 – the German Christian Democrats Wolfgang Schäuble and Karl Lamers published a document in which they called for a Kerneuropa (= core Europe). This idea envisaged that "core Europe" would have a "centripetal effect", a magnetic attraction for the rest of Europe. A precursor to that concept had been a proposal by two advisors to German Chancellor Helmut Kohl, Michael Mertes and Norbert J. Prill, published as early as July 1989. Mertes and Prill called for a "concentric circles Europe", built around a federal core consisting of the Inner Six (EU6) and like-minded EU member states. In 1994 they partly revoked their original idea, arguing that the post-Cold War EU would rather look like a "Europe of Olympic rings" than a "Europe of concentric circles".

The multi-speed Europe concept has been debated for years in European political circles, as a way to solve some institutional issues. The concept is that the more members there are in the Union, the more difficult it becomes to reach consensus on various topics, and the less likely it is that all would advance at the same pace in various fields.

The Inner Six alongside the Outer Seven from 1960 to 1972 Inner Six (EEC) Outer Seven (EFTA)

The idea of a multi-speed Europe has been revived because of the following initiatives:

- the Eurozone, with 21 member states and one more in ERM II (Denmark). Every EU member except Denmark has agreed by treaty to join, but many currently have no plans to do so.
- the Schengen Area, with 29 member states, 25 EU members and the 4 European Free Trade Association (EFTA) members (Iceland, Liechtenstein, Norway, and Switzerland). It excludes two EU members: Cyprus, which is legally obligated to join in the future, and Ireland, which has an opt-out from participating.
- other initiatives limited to some states, such as the Permanent Structured Cooperation (PESCO) and the Prüm Convention.

Furthermore, important events were:

- the enlargement of the European Union to 28 member states and in the forthcoming years other candidates (Albania, Bosnia and Herzegovina, Georgia, Kosovo, Moldova, Montenegro, North Macedonia, Serbia, Turkey, Ukraine) where new members initially don't join the Schengen Area and the Eurozone for some time.
- the European Convention that led to the European Constitution that was signed in 2004 by representatives of the EU25 and 3 candidate countries (Bulgaria, Romania and Turkey), but was not ratified by all national parliaments or assemblies and so failed. Later most of its provisions were adopted through the Treaty of Lisbon that included additional opt-outs for some states.
- Brexit - the United Kingdom’s decision to leave the European Union after the 2016 referendum, ending its formal membership in 2020.
- differences in views between EU members on some foreign diplomatic and military issues, especially in the aftermath of the Russian invasion of Ukraine in 2022, such as Ukraine's accession to the EU, EU military aid to Ukraine, and EU sanctions against Russia.
- The Draghi report - a policy blueprint by Mario Draghi warning that Europe faces a competitiveness crisis and calling for massive investment and deep structural reforms to fix it.

Map showing the member states of the European Union (clickable)

Currently in the EU there are the following cases of non-uniform application of the European Union law:

Permanent deviations (Note: In addition to the permanent deviations there are temporary transition periods for the application of certain EU law provisions in some member states, but these have an already set dates for lapsing.)	Request by states to cooperate more than general EU level	Request by states to cooperate less than general EU level
	Enhanced cooperation	Opt-outs in the European Union; Minor EU law derogations or exemptions special territories status

== Overview of non-uniformity inside the EU ==
It is possible for a minimum of nine EU member states to use enhanced cooperation. This framework has been used in the fields of divorce law, patents and to protect the financial interests of the EU by setting up the European Public Prosecutor's Office (EPPO). In 2026, the European Commission decided that the EPPO would cease to be an act under enhanced cooperation and would become part of the EU acquis.

Cooperation agreements amongst EU member states
Member State	Enhanced cooperation				Former enhanced cooperation	Permanent Structured Cooperation (PESCO)	Open method of coordination	Related intergovernmental treaties					Symbols of the European Union
Member State	Divorce Law Pact	Unitary patent	Property regimes of international couples	Ukraine Support Loan	European Public Prosecutor's Office	Permanent Structured Cooperation (PESCO)	Euro Plus Pact	Prüm Convention	European Stability Mechanism	European Fiscal Compact	Unified Patent Court	Single Resolution Fund	Symbols of the European Union
Austria	P	P	P	P	P	P	P	P	P	P	P	P	P
Belgium	P	P	P	P	P	P	P	P	P	P	P	P	P
Bulgaria	P	P	P	P	P	P	P	P	P	P	P	P	P
Croatia			P	P	P	P			P	P		P	
Cyprus		D	P	P	P	P	P		P	P	S	P	P
Czech Republic		D	P		P	P			N/A	D	S	D	
Denmark		P		P		P	P		N/A	P	P	S	
Estonia	P	P		P	P	P	P	P	P	P	P	P	
Finland		P	P	P	P	P	P	P	P	P	P	P	
France	P	P	P	P	P	P	P	P	P	P	P	P	P
Germany	P	P	P	P	P	P	P	P	P	P	P	P	P
Greece	P	D	P	P	P	P	P	I	P	P	S	P	P
Hungary	P	D			P	P		P	N/A	D	S	D	P
Ireland		D		P	I	P	P		P	P	S	P	
Italy	P	P	P	P	P	P	P	I	P	P	P	P	P
Latvia	P	P		P	P	P	P		P	P	P	P	
Lithuania	P	P		P	P	P	P		P	P	P	P	P
Luxembourg	P	P	P	P	P	P	P	P	P	P	P	P	P
Malta	P	P	P	P	P	I	P		P	P	P	P	P
Netherlands		P	P	P	P	P	P	P	P	P	P	P	
Poland		D		P	P	P	P		N/A	D	I	S	
Portugal	P	P	P	P	P	P	P	I	P	P	P	P	P
Romania	P	P		P	P	P	P	P	N/A	P	P	D	P
Slovakia		D			P	P	P	P	P	P	S	P	P
Slovenia	P	P	P	P	P	P	P	P	P	P	P	P	P
Spain	P		P	P	P	P	P	P	P	P		P	P
Sweden		P	P	P	P	P		I	N/A	D	P		

- P — Regulation/Treaty in force
- F — Participation formalized/Treaty ratified, but not in effect
- D — Derogation from full participation
- S — Signed the Treaty
- I — Announced interest in participation
- N/A — Not eligible to become a party as it is not a member of the Eurozone

== Membership in European Union agreements ==
EU members with at least one opt-out EU members without opt-outs

Most EU member states have joined all European treaties, instead of opting out on some. They drive the development of a federal model for the European integration. This is linked to the concept of multi-speed Europe where some countries would create a Federal Europe and goes back to the Inner Six references and the founding member states of the European Communities.

Among the 27 EU state members, 19 states have signed all integration agreements: Austria, Belgium, Bulgaria, Croatia, Estonia, Finland, France, Germany, Greece, Italy, Latvia, Lithuania, Luxembourg, Malta, Netherlands, Portugal, Slovakia, Slovenia and Spain. The agreements considered include the third stage of economic integration or the Eurozone, the Schengen Area, the Area of freedom, security and justice (AFSJ), the Customs Union, the European Economic Area (EEA), and the Charter of Fundamental Rights of the European Union (CFR).

All 27 EU countries have joined EEA and the Customs Union, 21 have joined the Eurozone, 25 have joined Schengen, 25 have no opt-outs under AFSJ, and 26 have no opt-outs under CFR. Also countries which do not belong to the EU have joined several of these agreements, some have unilaterally adopted the euro, and some de facto participate in Schengen.

The following table shows the membership status of each country in the various agreements promoted by the EU. It lists 38 countries, including the 27 EU Member States, the 4 EFTA Member States, 4 microstates, Turkey, which is a member of the Customs Union, and Kosovo and Montenegro, which have unilaterally adopted the euro. Some territories of EU member states also have a special status in regard to EU laws applied. Some territories of EFTA member states also have a special status in regard to EU laws applied. For member states that do not have special status territories the EU law applies fully with the exception of 10 special cases and the opt-outs in the European Union.

European Union Agreements
State	EEA	Customs Union	Schengen	Eurozone	AFSJ	CFR
Austria	Yes	Yes	Yes	Yes	Yes	Yes
Belgium	Yes	Yes	Yes	Yes	Yes	Yes
Bulgaria	Yes	Yes	Yes	Yes	Yes	Yes
Croatia	Yes	Yes	Yes	Yes	Yes	Yes
Estonia	Yes	Yes	Yes	Yes	Yes	Yes
Finland	Yes	Yes	Yes	Yes	Yes	Yes
France	Yes	Yes	Yes	Yes	Yes	Yes
Germany	Yes	Yes	Yes	Yes	Yes	Yes
Greece	Yes	Yes	Yes	Yes	Yes	Yes
Italy	Yes	Yes	Yes	Yes	Yes	Yes
Latvia	Yes	Yes	Yes	Yes	Yes	Yes
Lithuania	Yes	Yes	Yes	Yes	Yes	Yes
Luxembourg	Yes	Yes	Yes	Yes	Yes	Yes
Malta	Yes	Yes	Yes	Yes	Yes	Yes
Netherlands	Yes	Yes	Yes	Yes	Yes	Yes
Portugal	Yes	Yes	Yes	Yes	Yes	Yes
Slovakia	Yes	Yes	Yes	Yes	Yes	Yes
Slovenia	Yes	Yes	Yes	Yes	Yes	Yes
Spain	Yes	Yes	Yes	Yes	Yes	Yes
Czech Republic	Yes	Yes	Yes	Obliged to join	Yes	Yes
Hungary	Yes	Yes	Yes	Obliged to join	Yes	Yes
Poland	Yes	Yes	Yes	Obliged to join	Yes	Opt-out
Romania	Yes	Yes	Yes	Obliged to join	Yes	Yes
Sweden	Yes	Yes	Yes	Obliged to join	Yes	Yes
Cyprus	Yes	Yes	Obliged to join	Yes	Yes	Yes
Denmark	Yes	Yes	Yes	Opt-out	Opt-out	Yes
(Republic of Ireland) Ireland	Yes	Yes	Opt-out	Yes	Opt-out	Yes
Liechtenstein	Yes	No	Yes	No	No	No
Norway	Yes	No	Yes	No	No	No
Iceland	Yes	No	Yes	No	No	No
Switzerland	No	No	Yes	No	No	No
Andorra	No	Yes	Yes (Note: de facto)	Yes	No	No
Monaco	No	Yes	Yes	Yes	No	No
San Marino	No	Yes	Yes	Yes	No	No
Vatican City	No	No	Yes	Yes	No	No
Turkey	No	Yes	No	No	No	No
Kosovo	No	No	No	Yes (Note: unilaterally adopted)	No	No
Montenegro	No	No	No	Yes	No	No

== Participation of non-EU member states in EU-led integration initiatives ==
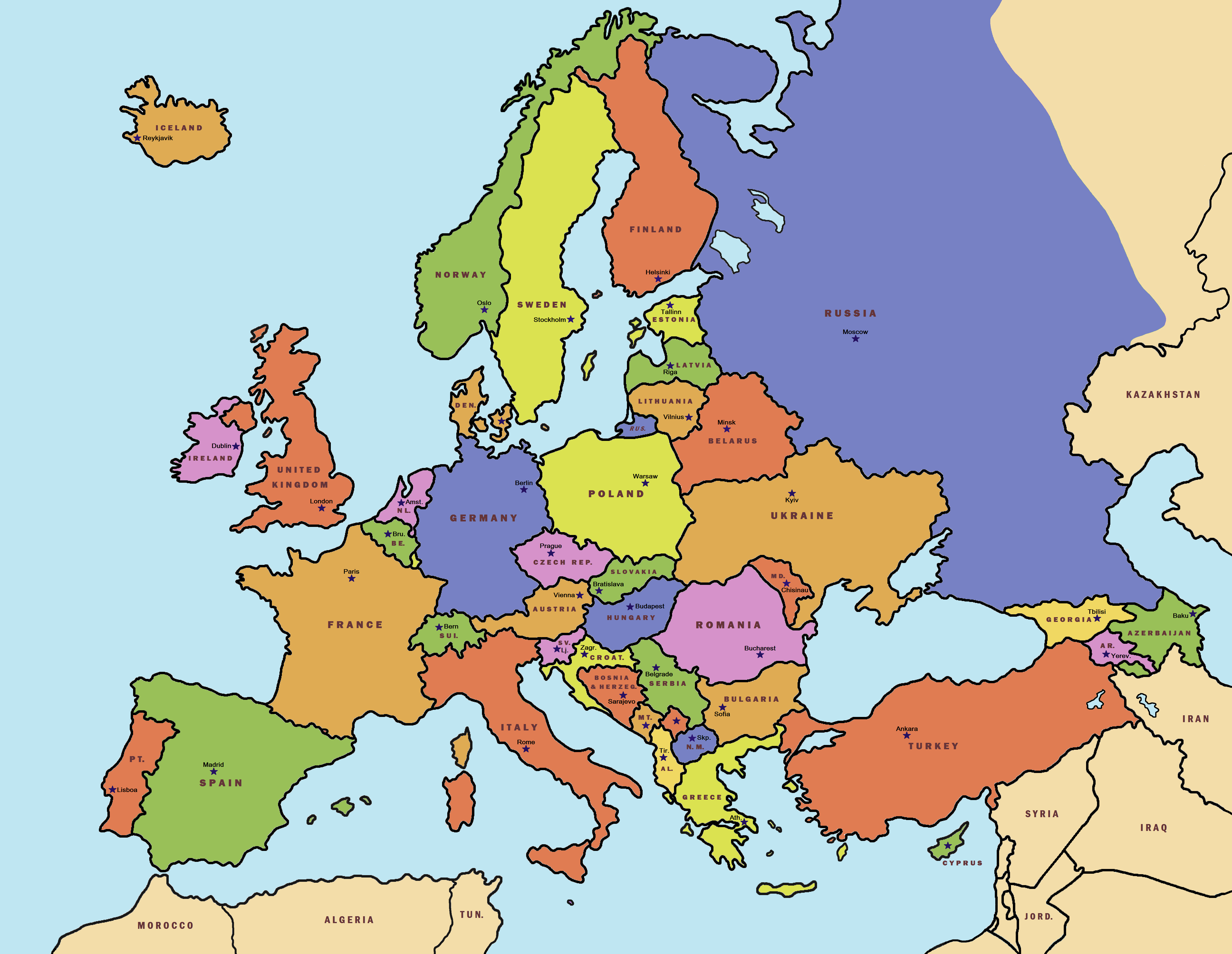
Political map of Europe (Countries colored in beige are outside Europe.)

A number of countries have special relations to the European Union implementing many of its regulations. Prominently there are Norway, Iceland, Switzerland and Liechtenstein which are the only remaining EFTA members while all other former EFTA members have converted into EU members. Through agreements, Norway, Iceland and Liechtenstein (excluding Switzerland) have been members of the European Economic Area since 1994 and 1995 respectively. As a consequence of taking part in the European single market they need to adopt part of the Law of the European Union. Formally they would not need to fund the EU government. In practice, they have chosen to participate in reducing economic and social inequalities in the European Economic Area by making a financial contribution (EEA and Norway Grants) to its economic and social cohesion, with Norway's financial footprint equal to that of an EU member since 2009. Especially Norway and Iceland are known to forfeit EU membership on the basis of EU fishery regulations that they want to opt out on. Both Norway and Iceland have signed and implemented the Schengen Area agreements from the start. During the turmoils of the financial crisis, Iceland was looking into membership of the Eurozone and it did apply for EU membership in 2009. Norway has applied to EU membership multiple times but while fulfilling the requirements the membership was rejected by referendums in 1972 and 1994. This leaves Norway to be integrated into some of European Union institutions while not being part of the EU governing body. Additionally, there are various examples of non-participation by some EU members and non-EU states participation in particular Agencies of the European Union and programmes such as the Erasmus Programme.

On 16 July 2026, the Council of the European Union approved the signing and provisional application of a new EU association agreement with Andorra and San Marino, marking a significant step toward deeper integration between the two microstates and the European Union. Andorra and San Marino will participate in a harmonised, expanded version of the European single market. They will operate under the same rules and competitive conditions as EU member states.

Participant	SEPA	EHIC	European single market	EURATOM	ECSEE	ENTSO-E	ECAA	EEA	EUDA	EMSA	EASA	ERA	EDA	EUSPA	Military Mobility	DCFTA	EaP	Erasmus Programme	EUROfusion	ENTSOG	Euronest Parliamentary Assembly	EU IFIs
Albania	x				x	x	x													o		
Andorra	x		s																			
Armenia					o		x										x				x	
Austria	x	x	x	x	x	x	x	x	x	x	x	x	x	x	x	x	x	x	x	x	x	x
Azerbaijan																	x				x	
Belgium	x	x	x	x	x	x	x	x	x	x	x	x	x	x	x	x	x	x	x	x	x	x
Bosnia and Herzegovina					x	x	x													o		
Bulgaria	x	x	x	x	x	x	x	x	x	x	x	x	x	x	x	x	x	x	x	x	x	x
Croatia	x	x	x	x	x	x	x	x	x	x	x	x	x	x	x	x	x	x	x	x	x	x
Cyprus	x	x	x	x	x	x	x	x	x	x	x	x	x	x	x	x	x	x	x		x	x
Czech Republic	x	x	x	x	x	x	x	x	x	x	x	x	x	x	x	x	x	x	x	x	x	x
Denmark	x	x	x	x	x	x	x	x	x	x	x	x	x	x	x	x	x	x	x	x	x	x
Estonia	x	x	x	x	x	x	x	x	x	x	x	x	x	x	x	x	x	x	x	x	x	x
Finland	x	x	x	x	x	x	x	x	x	x	x	x	x	x	x	x	x	x	x	x	x	x
France	x	x	x	x	x	x	x	x	x	x	x	x	x	x	o	x	x	x	x	x	x	x
Georgia					x		x									x	x				x	
Germany	x	x	x	x	x	x	x	x	x	x	x	x	x	x	x	x	x	x	x	x	x	x
Greece	x	x	x	x	x	x	x	x	x	x	x	x	x	x	x	x	x	x	x	x	x	x
Hungary	x	x	x	x	x	x	x	x	x	x	x	x	x	x	x	x	x	x	x	x	x	x
Iceland	x	x	x			x	x	x		x	x					x		x				
Ireland	x	x	x	x	x	x	x	x	x	x	x	x	x	x		x	x	x	x	x	x	x
Italy	x	x	x	x	x	x	x	x	x	x	x	x	x	x	x	x	x	x	x	x	x	x
Kosovo					x		x															
Latvia	x	x	x	x	x	x	x	x	x	x	x	x	x	x	x	x	x	x	x	x	x	x
Liechtenstein	x	x	x					x			x					x		x				
Lithuania	x	x	x	x	x	x	x	x	x	x	x	x	x	x	x	x	x	x	x	x	x	x
Luxembourg	x	x	x	x	x	x	x	x	x	x	x	x	x	x	x	x	x	x	x	x	x	x
Malta	x	x	x	x	x		x	x	x	x	x	x	x	x		x	x	x			x	x
Moldova	x				x	o	x									x	x				x	
Monaco	x																					
Montenegro	x				x	x	x															
Netherlands	x	x	x	x	x	x	x	x	x	x	x	x	x	x	x	x	x	x	x	x	x	x
North Macedonia	x				x	x	x											x		o		
Norway	x	x	x		o	x	x	x	x	x	x	x		x	x	x		x		o		
Poland	x	x	x	x	x	x	x	x	x	x	x	x	x	x	x	x	x	x	x	x	x	x
Portugal	x	x	x	x	x	x	x	x	x	x	x	x	x	x	x	x	x	x	x	x	x	x
Romania	x	x	x	x	x	x	x	x	x	x	x	x	x	x	x	x	x	x	x	x	x	x
San Marino	x		s																			
Serbia	x				x	x	x											x				
Slovakia	x	x	x	x	x	x	x	x	x	x	x	x	x	x	x	x	x	x	x	x	x	x
Slovenia	x	x	x	x	x	x	x	x	x	x	x	x	x	x	x	x	x	x	x	x	x	x
Spain	x	x	x	x	x	x	x	x	x	x	x	x	x	x	x	x	x	x	x	x	x	x
Sweden	x	x	x	x	x	x	x	x	x	x	x	x	x	x	x	x	x	x	x	x	x	x
Switzerland	x	x	x	x		x		x			x			x		x			x	o		
Turkey					o	o		x	x									x				
Ukraine					x	x	x									x	x		x	o	x	
United Kingdom	x	x		x		s (Note: participates through System Operator for Northern Ireland (SONI))						x			x				x			x
Vatican City	x																					

x – member
c – conditions to be fulfilled before joining
s – unilateral adoption/participation through another state who is a member/some instruments signed, but not yet ratified
o – observer

== Post-Brexit revival of multi-speed Europe ideas ==
=== The 60th anniversary of the EU and the White Paper on the Future of Europe ===
On 1 March 2017, the European Commission released a "White Paper on the Future of Europe". This document was meant to guide discussions at the Rome Summit on 25 March 2017, where EU leaders would reflect on 60 years of European integration and considered how the Union should evolve after Brexit, with 27 Member States. As the EU marked six decades of peace, freedom and prosperity for its 500 million citizens, it also faced major challenges: technological change, globalisation, security threats, and rising populism. Europe’s demographic and economic weight was shrinking compared to other regions, making unity more important. The White Paper outlined five possible scenarios how the EU could respond to these pressures and shape its future by 2025. They were illustrative, not prescriptive, and could overlap:

1. Carrying On
2. Nothing but the Single Market – The EU27 is gradually re-centred on the single market as the 27 Member States are not able to find common ground on an increasing number of policy areas.
3. Those Who Want More Do More – The EU27 proceeds as today but allows willing Member States to do more together in specific areas such as defence, internal security or social matters. One or several "coalitions of the willing" emerge.
4. Doing Less More Efficiently - The EU27 focuses on delivering more and faster in selected policy areas, while doing less where it is perceived not to have an added value. Attention and limited resources are focused on selected policy areas.
5. Doing Much More Together – Member States decide to share more power, resources and decision-making across the board. Decisions are agreed faster at European level and rapidly enforced.

=== E6 and the completion of the European single market ===
In January 2026, German Finance Minister Lars Klingbeil invited finance ministers from France, Poland, Spain, Italy, and the Netherlands to join Germany in forming a leading group that would coordinate closely on economic and strategic issues. He urged the European Union to adopt a two‑speed Europe model in which a smaller group of major economies can move ahead more quickly on important policies, rather than waiting for all 27 member states to agree, with the goal to make the EU more agile, competitive, and resilient in a turbulent global environment. In May 2026, the E6 group (European Union’s six largest economies - Germany, France, Italy, Spain, the Netherlands and Poland) reached a political agreement in Berlin to advance the EU’s long‑running effort to build a more integrated financial market. The initiative, part of the Markets Integration and Supervision Package (MISP), aims to strengthen the European Securities and Markets Authority (ESMA) and move the EU toward a U.S.-style investment framework - The Savings and Investments Union (SIU) - that is capable of mobilizing private capital across the bloc. The E6 agreed that ESMA should receive expanded supervisory powers, including authority over major crypto firms, through a phased transition implemented “as soon as possible,” though without a fixed timeline. The group intends to present its compromise to the full Council of EU finance ministers, where approval requires support from at least 15 member states representing 65 percent of the EU population. The initiative has drawn criticism from smaller member states, particularly Ireland and Luxembourg, which host significant financial sectors and oppose the creation of a single EU‑level watchdog. Irish officials warned that the E6 format risks marginalizing smaller countries and contributing to a two‑speed Europe. Some diplomats also expressed concern that the E6 could weaken existing forums such as the Eurogroup. Despite these tensions, the E6 plans further meetings to coordinate positions on broader economic and geopolitical issues, including strengthening the euro’s global role and improving defense investment strategies.

The Savings and Investments Union is an emerging policy initiative of the European Union designed to address the persistent fragmentation of Europe’s financial landscape and to complete the last major unfinished component of the Single Market. It builds on the long‑running Capital Markets Union project but expands its scope by focusing not only on market structures and investment flows but also on the behaviour of households, the allocation of private savings, and the institutional architecture required to channel capital efficiently across borders. The initiative was shaped by the conclusions of the Draghi and Letta reports, both of which argued that Europe’s competitiveness problem is inseparable from its inability to mobilise its vast pool of private savings for productive investment. These reports emphasised that the Single Market remains incomplete because capital does not move freely enough between Member States, financial products are not sufficiently standardised, and supervisory practices remain nationally fragmented. The Savings and Investments Union is therefore presented as the structural reform capable of removing these barriers.

=== EU integration of Ukraine ===
In April 2026, German Chancellor Friedrich Merz put forward a plan to speed up Ukraine’s integration into the European Union by creating a new status called "associate membership". In a letter to top EU leaders—including European Council President Antonio Costa, European Commission President Ursula von der Leyen, and Cypriot President Nikos Christodoulides—Merz argued that the EU no longer has time for delays and must adopt bold, innovative steps to move Ukraine closer to the bloc. Under Merz’s proposal, Ukraine would first join the EU as an associate member, which would allow it to participate in meetings of EU leaders and ministers without voting rights. The country would also gain a non‑voting European commissioner, associated MEPs, and the ability to speak at major EU gatherings. This status would run in parallel with Ukraine’s ongoing reforms in areas such as the rule of law and minority rights, which are required for full membership. Merz emphasized that this would not be a “membership light,” but a meaningful intermediate stage designed to energize a stalled enlargement debate. German politician and former MEP Elmar Brok supported Merz’s idea, calling it a “good idea” and pointing to the precedent of the European Free Trade Association (EFTA) countries, which once formed the European Economic Area (EEA) with the EU. That arrangement gave countries like Norway, Iceland, and Switzerland about 70% of the benefits of EU membership, while others—Finland, Sweden, and Austria—used it as a stepping stone to full accession. Brok argued that Ukraine could follow a similar path, especially since its Free Trade Agreement with the EU has been in force since 2015, meaning parts of the integration process are already underway. He believes such a model could be implemented quickly, without requiring full ratification by all 27 EU states, provided there is enough political will. The whole idea of giving Ukraine associate membership before full EU accession fits into the long‑running concept of multi‑speed Europe, where different countries integrate into the EU at different depths and speeds instead of all moving in lockstep.

== See also ==
- Agencies of the European Union
- Enhanced cooperation
- Opt-outs in the European Union
- Inner Six
- European Free Trade Association
- Federal Europe
- Multi-speed integration
- Differentiated integration
- European integration
- Euroscepticism
