= Statistics relating to enlargement of the European Union =

Chart of the population development of
the EU affiliated with the enlargement process.

This is a sequence of tables giving statistical data for past and future enlargements of the European Union. All data refer to the populations, land areas, and gross domestic products (GDP) of the respective countries at the time of their accession to the European Union, illustrating historically accurate changes to the Union. The GDP figures are at purchasing power parity, in United States dollar at 1990 prices.

== Past enlargements ==
=== Foundation ===
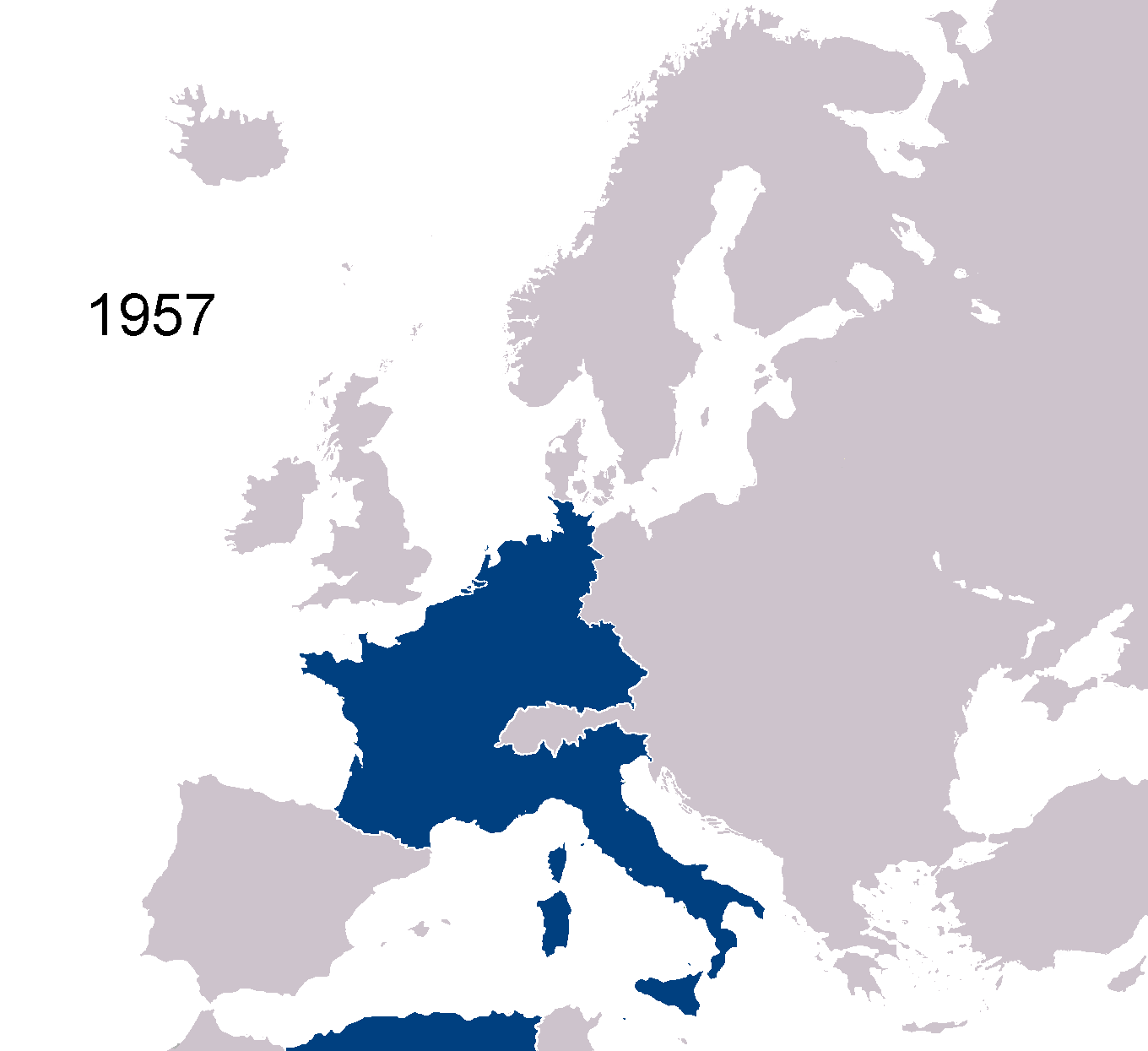
The EC6 in 1957

Member countries	Population	Area (km^{2})	GDP (billion US$)	GDP per capita (US$)
Belgium	9,052,707	30,528	58.316	$46,878
France	44,788,852	674,843	312.966	$40,690
West Germany	54,292,038	248,717	400.554	$41,168
Italy	49,476,000	301,336	265.192	$30,116
Luxembourg	310,291	2,586	2.938	$113,533
Netherlands	11,186,847	41,526	83.351	$50,355
EC6 (1958)	169,106,736	1,299,536	1,123.317	6,643

=== 1973 enlargement ===
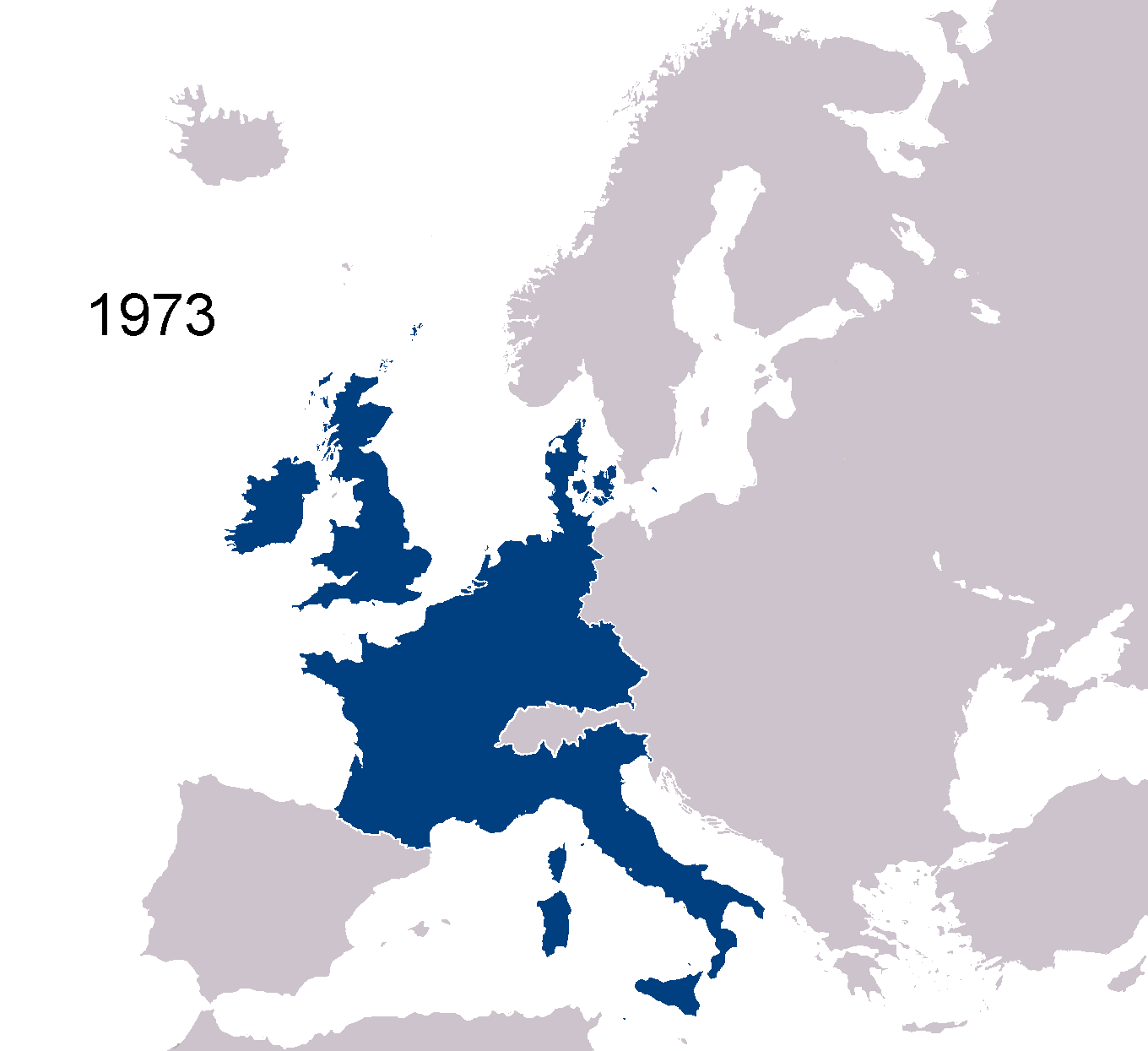
The EC9 in 1973

Member countries	Population	Area (km^{2})	GDP (billion US$)	GDP per capita (US$)
Denmark	5,021,861	43,094	70.032	$59,928
Ireland	3,073,200	70,273	21.103	$39,638
United Kingdom	56,210,000	244,820	675.941	$36,728
Accession countries	64,305,061	358,187	767.076	11,929
Existing members (1973)	192,457,106	1,299,536	2,381,396	12,374
EC9 (1973)	256,762,167 (+33.41%)	1,657,723 (+25.44%)	3,148.472 (+32.21%)	12,262 (−0.91%)

=== 1981 enlargement ===
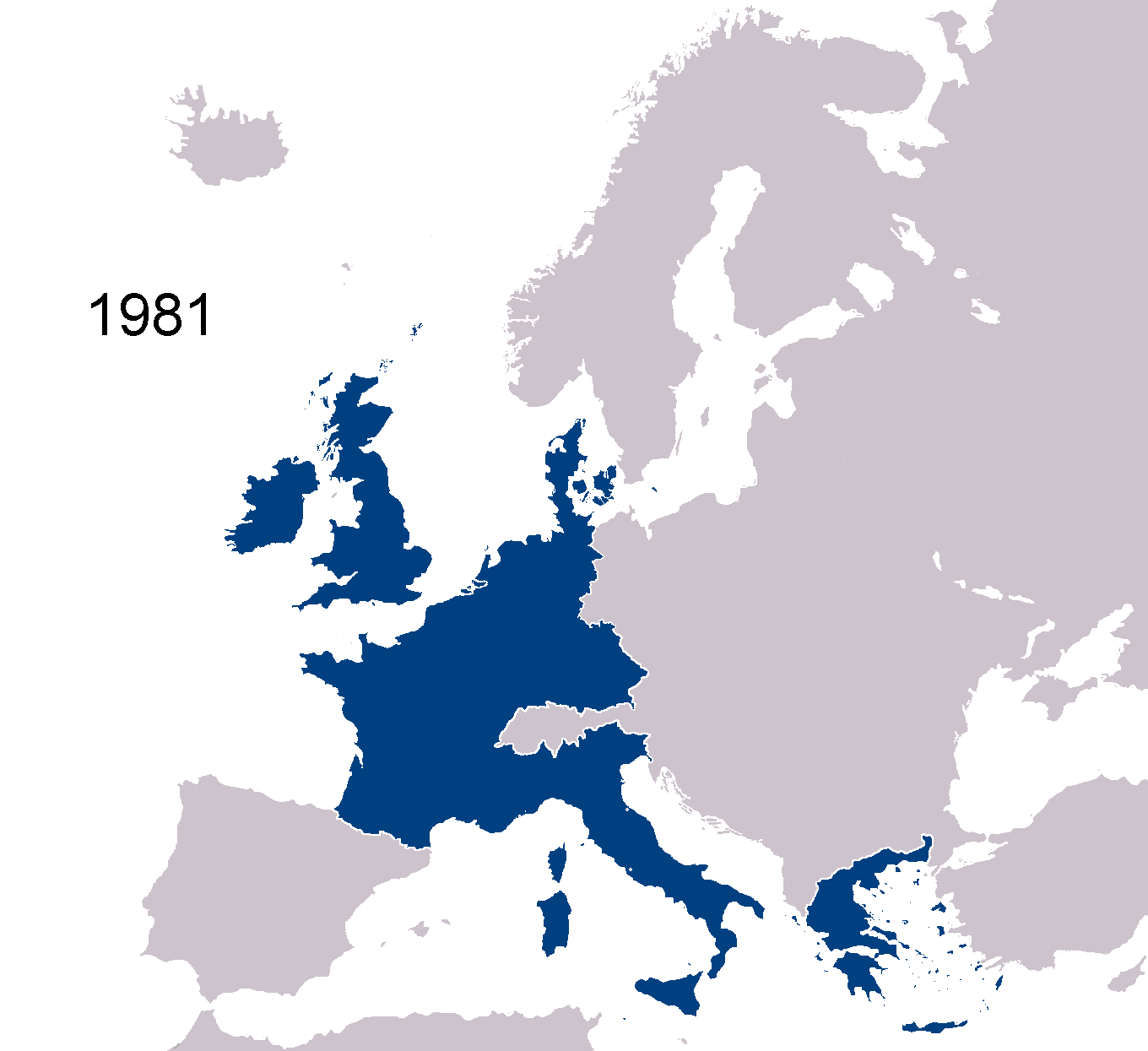
The EC10 in 1981

Member countries	Population	Area (km^{2})	GDP (billion US$)	GDP per capita (US$)
Greece	9,729,350	131,945	86.553	8,896
Existing members (1981)	261,743,191	1,657,723	3,694,558	14,115
EC10 (1981)	271,472,541 (+3.72%)	1,789,668 (+7.96%)	3,781.111 (+2.34%)	13,928 (−1.33%)

=== 1986 enlargement ===
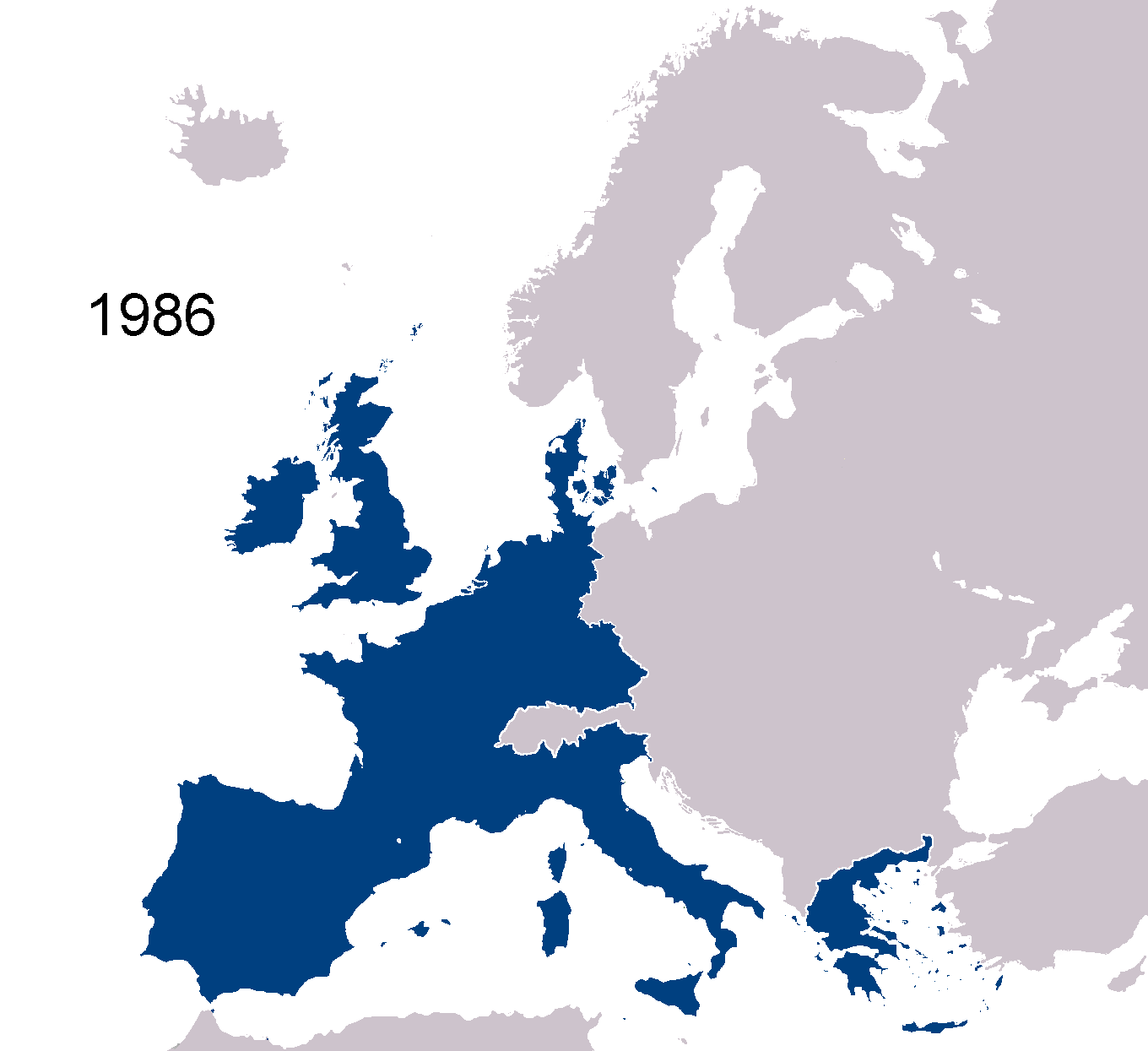
The EC12 in 1986

Member countries	Population	Area (km^{2})	GDP (billion US$)	GDP per capita (US$)
Portugal	9,907,411	92,391	85.610	8,641
Spain	38,707,556	504,782	386.998	9,998
Accession countries	48,614,967	597,173	472.608	9,721
Existing members (1986)	273,398,552	1,789,668	4,186.176	15,312
EC12 (1986) EU12 (1993)	322,013,519 (+17.78%)	2,386,841 (+33.37%)	4,658.784 (+11.29%)	14,468 (−5.51%)

=== 1990 enlargement ===
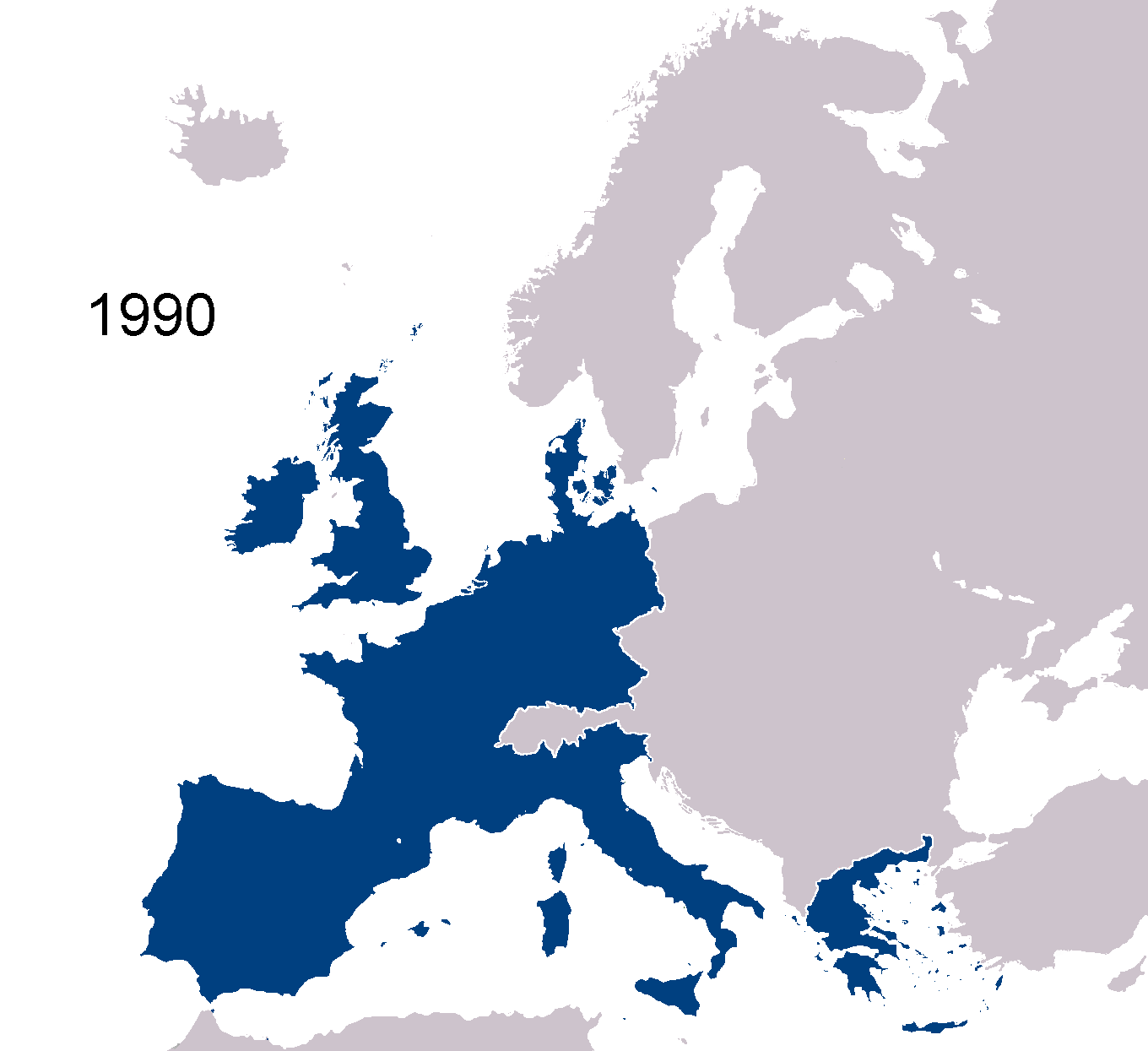
The EC12 in 1990

Member countries	Population	Area (km2)	GDP (billion US$)	GDP per capita (US$)
East Germany	16,111,000	108,333	159.5	9,800
Existing members (1986)	322,013,519	2,386,841	4,658.784	14,468

=== 1995 enlargement ===
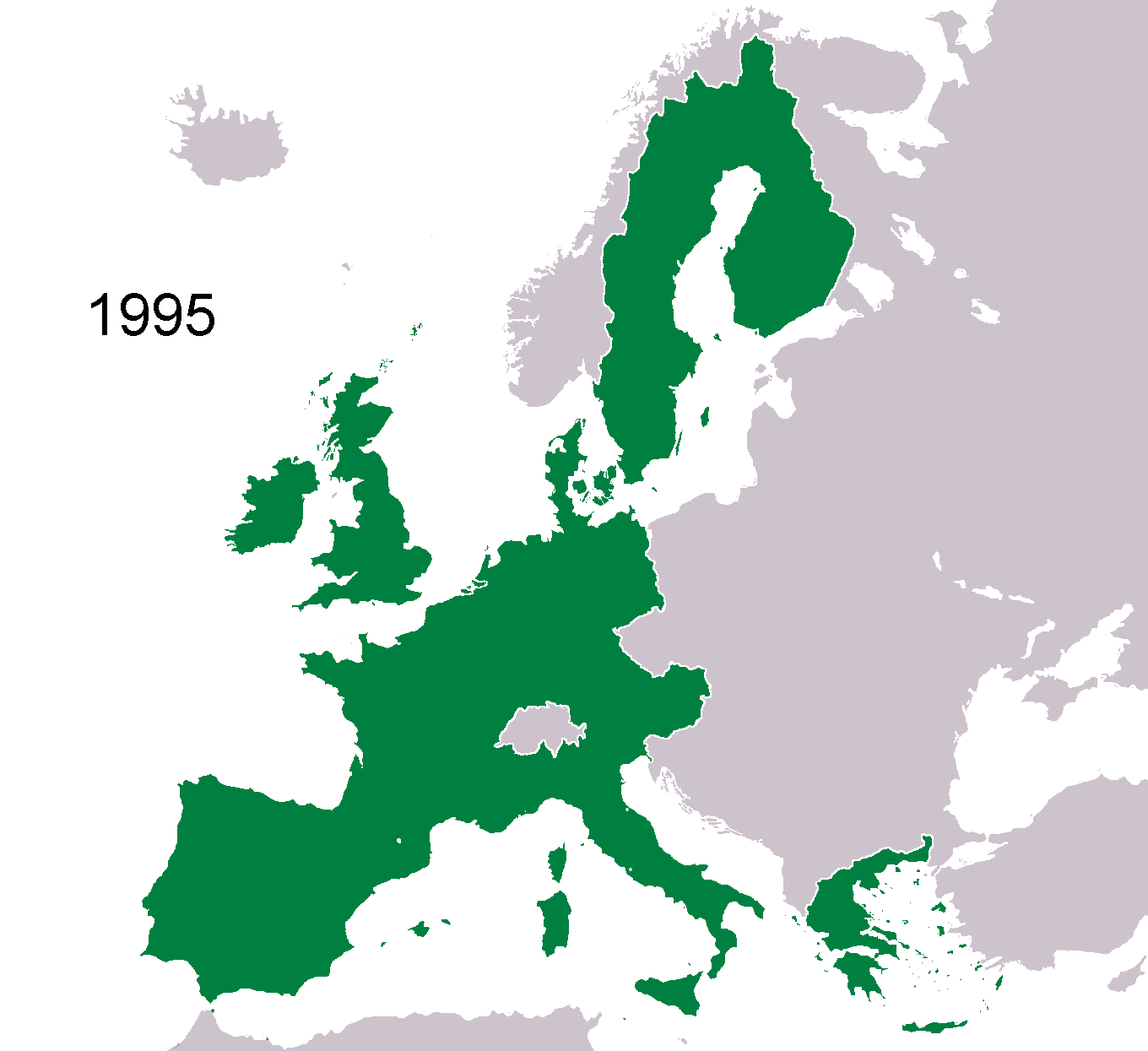
The EU15 in 1995

Member countries	Population	Area (km^{2})	GDP (billion US$)	GDP per capita (US$)
Austria	8,206,524	83,871	145.238	18,048
Finland	5,261,008	338,145	80.955	15,859
Sweden	9,047,752	449,964	156.640	17,644
Accession countries	22,515,284	871,980	382.833	17,378
Existing members (1995)	350,909,402	2,495,174	5,894.232	16,797
EU15 (1995)	373,424,686 (+6.4%)	3,367,154 (+34.95%)	6,277.065 (+6.50%)	16,831 (+0.20%)

=== 2004 enlargement ===
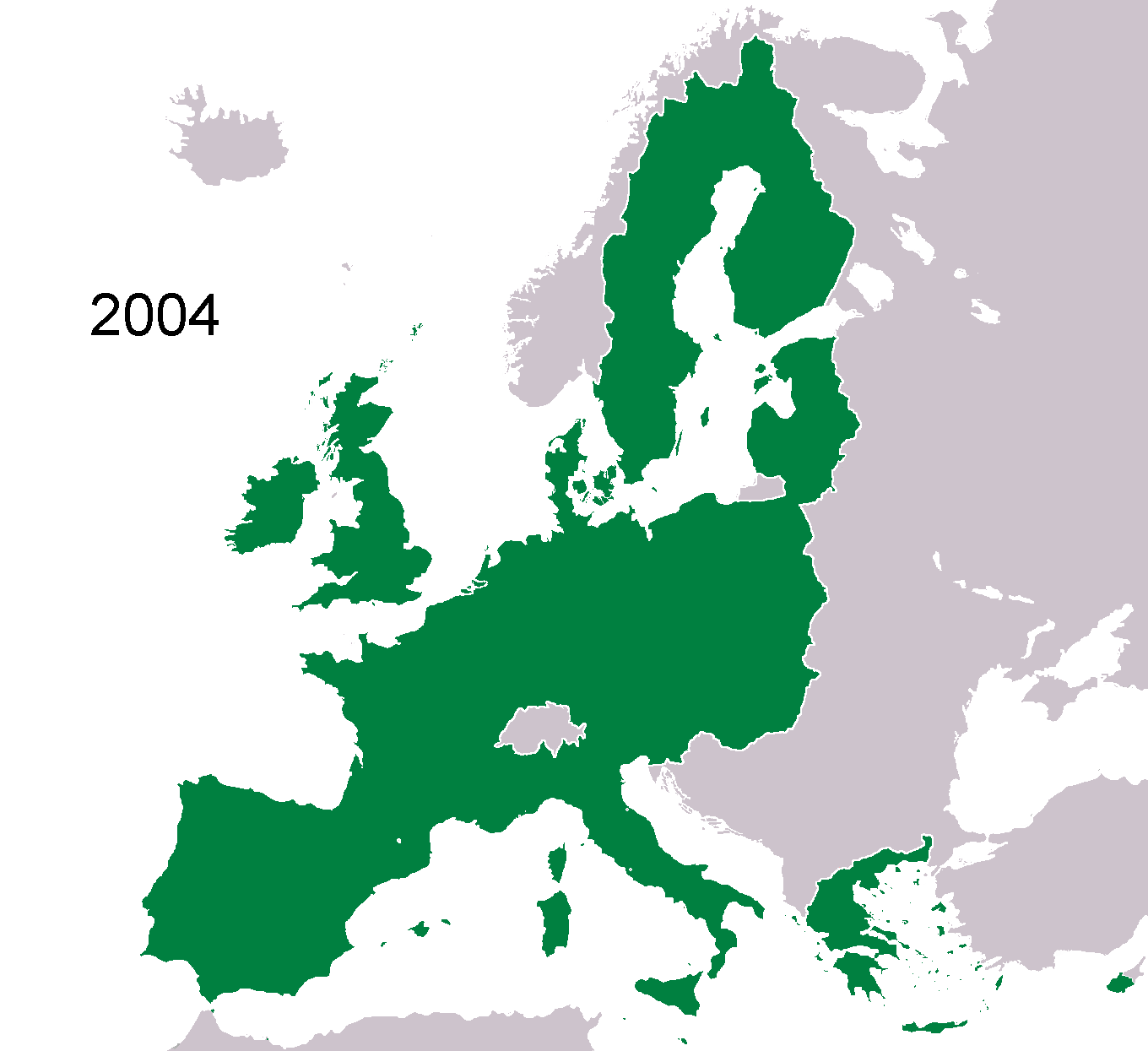
The EU25 in 2004

Member countries	Population	Area (km^{2})	GDP (billion US$)	GDP per capita (US$)
Cyprus	775,927	9,250	11.681	15,054
Czech Republic	10,246,178	78,866	105.248	10,272
Estonia	1,341,664	45,226	22.384	16,684
Hungary	10,032,375	93,030	102,183	10,185
Latvia	2,306,306	64,589	24.826	10,764
Lithuania	3,607,899	65,200	31.971	8,861
Malta	396,851	316	5.097	12,843
Poland	38,580,445	311,904	316.438	8,202
Slovakia	5,423,567	49,036	42.800	7,810
Slovenia	2,011,473	20,273	29.633	14,732
Accession countries	74,722,685	737,690	685.123	9,169
Existing members (2004)	381,781,620	3,367,154	7,711.871	20,200
EU25 (2004)	456,504,305 (+19.57%)	4,104,844 (+17.97%)	8,396,994 (+8.88%)	18,394 (−8.94%)

=== 2007 enlargement ===
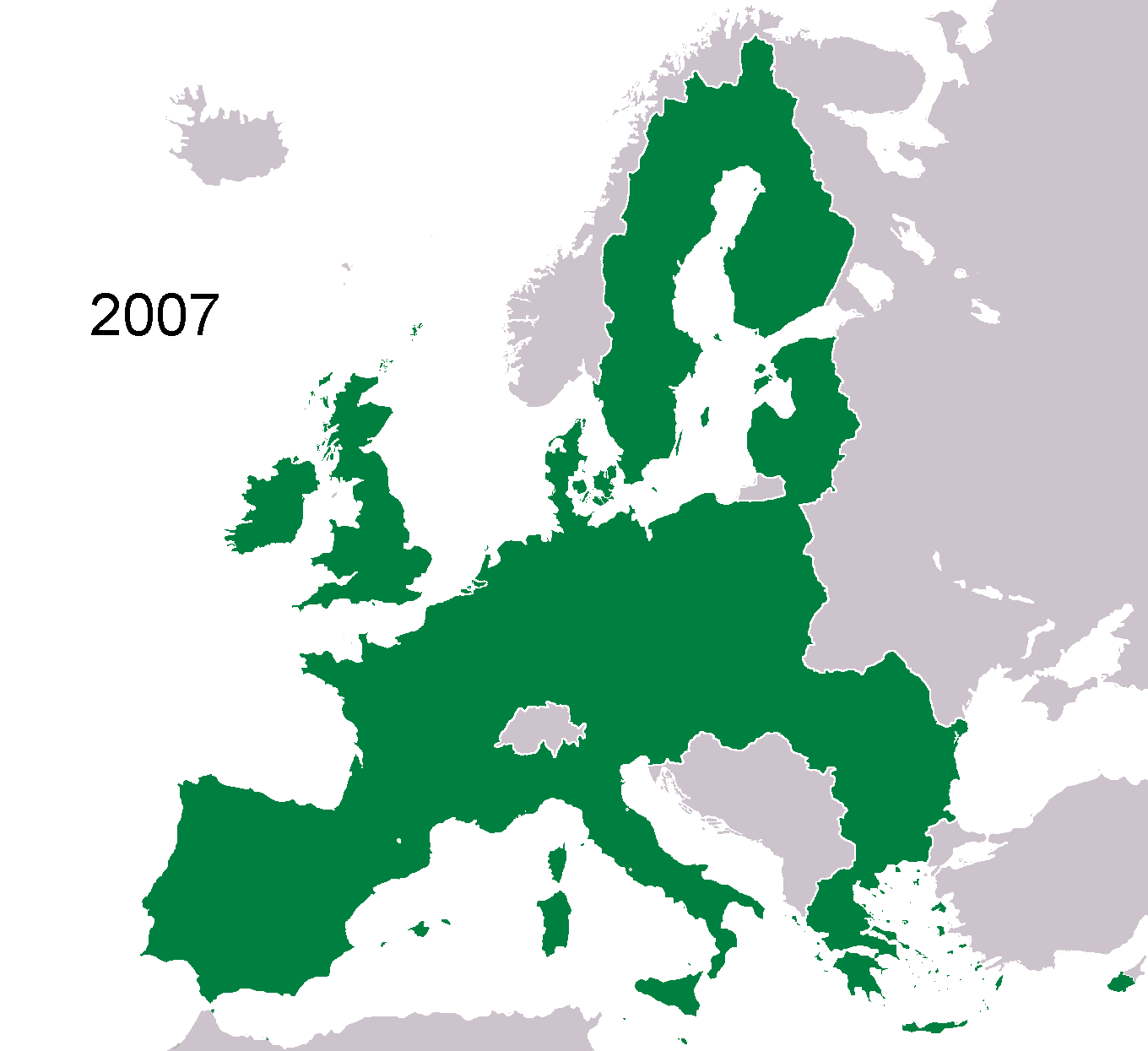
The EU27 in 2007

Member countries	Population	Area (km^{2})	GDP (billion US$)	GDP per capita (US$)
Bulgaria	7,761,000	111,002	62.29	8,026
Romania	22,329,977	238,391	204.4	9,153
Accession countries	30,090,977	349,393	266.69	8,863
Existing members (2007)	464,205,901	4,104,844	12,170.11	26,217
EU27 (2007)	494,296,878 (+6.48%)	4,454,237 (+8.51%)	12,436.80 (+2.04%)	25,160.59 (−4.03%)

=== 2013 enlargement ===
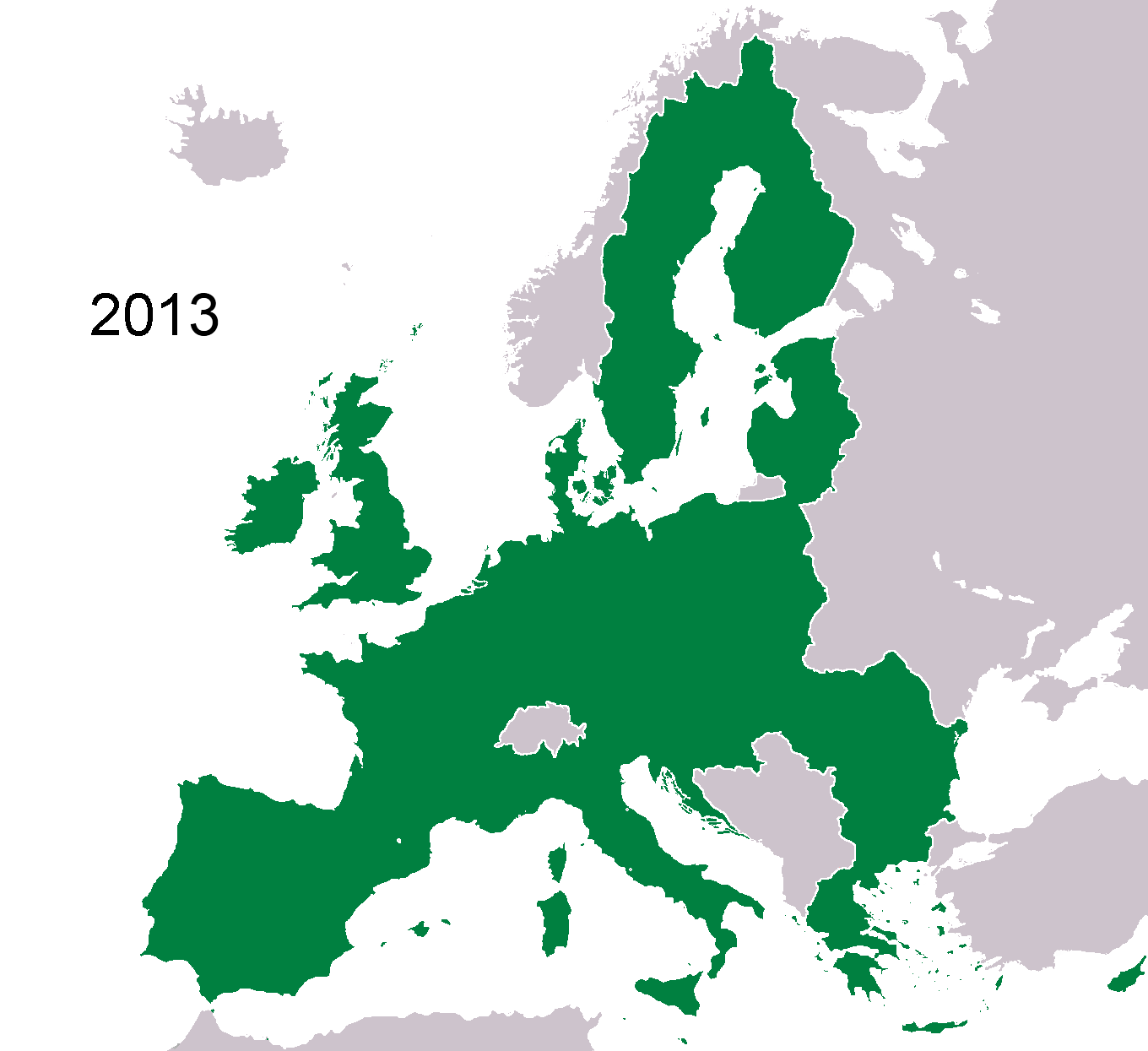
The EU28 in 2013

Member countries	Population	Area (km^{2})	GDP (billion US$)	GDP per capita (US$)
Croatia	4,290,612	56,594	80.983	18,338
Existing members (2013)	503,492,041	4,454,237	15,821.00	31,607
EU28 (2013)	506,777,111 (+0.85%)	4,510,831 (+1.31%)	15,868.983 (+0.51%)	31,313.54 (−0.74%)

=== UK withdrawal ===
The EU27 in 2020

== Candidate countries ==
Member states Candidates: Albania, Moldova, Montenegro, North Macedonia, Serbia, Turkey and Ukraine Potential candidates that submitted a membership application: Bosnia and Herzegovina and Georgia Potential candidates that have not submitted a membership application: Kosovo (status disputed)

=== EU27 ===
	Population	Area (km^{2})	GDP (billion US$)	GDP per capita (US$)
European Union	447,007,596	4,233,262	17,046	38,134

=== Albania ===
Member countries	Population (2024)	Area	GDP (2024)	GDP per capita	Languages
Albania	2,714,617	28,748 km^{2} 11,100 mi^{2}	26.13B USD	US$10,878	Albanian
EU27	449,206,579	4,233,262 km^{2} 1,634,472 mi^{2}	19.403T USD	US$43,194	24
EU27+1	451,608,692 (+0.53%)	4,262,010 km^{2} 1,645,571 mi^{2} (+0.68%)	19.429T USD (+0.135%)	US$43,022 (–0.39%)	25 (+1)

=== Armenia ===
Member countries	Population	Area (km^{2})	GDP (US$)	GDP per capita (US$)	Languages
Armenia	3,033,500	29,743	25.4 billion	8,575	Armenian
EU27	447,007,596	4,233,262	17,046 billion	38,134	24
EU27+1	450,041,096	4,263,005	17,071 billion	37,932	25 (+1)

=== Bosnia and Herzegovina ===
Country	Population	Area (km^{2})	GDP (billion US$)	GDP per capita (US$)	Languages
Bosnia and Herzegovina	3,434,000	51,209	29.08	8,416	Bosnian; Croatian; Serbian
EU27 + Bosnia and Herzegovina	450,441,596 (+0.77%)	4,284,471 (+1.21%)	17,075 (+0.17%)	37,907 (−0.60%)	26 (+2)

=== Georgia ===
Member countries	Population	Area (km^{2})	GDP (US$)	GDP per capita (US$)	Languages
(Georgia (country)) Georgia	3,688,647	69,700	30 billion	8,164	Georgian
EU27	447,007,596	4,233,262	17,046 billion	38,134	24
EU27+1	450,731,931 (+0.83%)	4,302,962 (+1.65%)	17,076 billion (+0.18%)	37,885 (−0.65%)	25 (+1)

=== Montenegro ===
Country	Population	Area (km^{2})	GDP (billion US$)	GDP per capita (US$)	Languages
Montenegro	620,739	13,812	4.79	7,717	Montenegrin
EU27 + Montenegro	449,853,551 (+0.14%)	4,262,010 (+0.33%)	17,063 (+0.03%)	37,930 (-0.11%)	25 (+1)

=== Moldova ===
Member countries	Population	Area (km^{2})	GDP (US$)	GDP per capita (US$)	Languages
Moldova	2,512,758	30,334	16 billion	6,410	Romanian
EU27	447,007,596	4,233,262	17.046 trillion	38,134	24
EU27+1	449,520,896 (+0.56%)	4,263,113 (+0.71%)	17.062 trillion (+0.09%)	37,825 (−0.81%)	24

=== North Macedonia ===
Member countries	Population	Area (km^{2})	GDP (billion US$)	GDP per capita (US$)	Languages
North Macedonia	1,836,713	25,713	12.383	6,143	Macedonian & Albanian
EU27	447,007,596	4,233,262	17,046	38,957	24
EU27+1	448,844,309 (+0.45%)	4,258,975 (+0.61%)	17,277.98 (+0.06%)	38,134 (–0.2%)	25 (+1)

=== Serbia ===
Country	Population	Area (km^{2})	GDP (billion US$)	GDP per capita (US$)	Languages
Serbia	6,871,547	77,474	65.70	9,561	Serbian
EU27 + Serbia	453,879,143 (+1.54%)	4,310,736 (+1.83%)	17,112 (+0.39%)	37,702 (-1.13%)	25 (+1)

=== Turkey ===
Country	Population	Area (km^{2})	GDP (billion US$)	GDP per capita (US$)	Languages
Turkey	84,680,273	783,356	692.38	8,176	Turkish
EU27 + Turkey	531,687,869 (+18.94%)	5,016,618 (+18.50%)	17,739 (+4.06%)	33,363 (-12.51%)	25 (+1)

=== Ukraine ===
Member countries	Population	Area (km^{2})	Population density (/km^{2})	GDP (billion US$)	GDP per capita (US$)	Languages
Ukraine	33,443,000	603,628	55.4	190	5,759	Ukrainian
EU27	449,206,579	4,225,104	106.32	20,287	45,163	24
EU27+1	482,649,579 (▲7.44%)	4,828,732 (▲14.29%)	99.95 (▼5.99%)	20,477 (▲0.94%)	42,427 (▼6.06%)	25 (+1)

=== All Candidates ===
Countries	Population	Area (km^{2})	GDP (billion US$)	GDP per capita (US$)
Albania; Armenia; Bosnia and Herzegovina; Georgia; Moldova; Montenegro; North Macedonia; Serbia; Turkey; Ukraine	147,742,310	1,687,486	1,048	7,093
EU37	594,749,906 (+33.05%)	5,920,748 (+39.86%)	18,094 (+6.15%)	30,423 (-20.22%)

Note: All data sourced from individual country entries on Wikipedia. Populations usually 2021 estimates; historical/future estimates not used. Figures are approximate due to fluctuations in population and economies.

== See also ==
- Demographics of the European Union

== Footnotes ==
1. Algeria was part of France until 1962.
2. German reunification in 1990 led to the inclusion of the territory of the former German Democratic Republic. This enlargement is not explicitly mentioned. Data for Germany in all tables is from current statistics.
3. Greenland left the EC in 1985.
4. Officially the whole of Cyprus lies within the European Union. "In light of Protocol 10 of the Accession Treaty 2003 Cyprus as a whole entered the EU, whereas the acquis is suspended in the northern part of the island ("areas not under effective control of the Government of the Republic of Cyprus"). This means inter alia that these areas are outside the customs and fiscal territory of the EU. The suspension has territorial effect, but does not concern the personal rights of Turkish Cypriots as EU citizens, as they are considered as citizens of the Member State Republic of Cyprus".
