= Single Economic Space of the Eurasian Economic Union =

Single market

Eurasian Economic Space
- Policy of: EAEU
- Type: Single market
- Member states: Armenia; Belarus; Kazakhstan; Kyrgyzstan; Russia
- Establishment: 1 January 2012

Area
  - Total: 20,260,431 km^{2} (7,822,596 sq mi)

Population
  - 2013 estimate: 182,519,270
  - Density: 9.01/km^{2} (23.3/sq mi)
- GDP (PPP): 2013 estimate
  - Total: $4.1 trillion
  - Per capita: $22,000
- GDP (nominal): 2013 estimate
  - Total: $2.4 trillion
  - Per capita: $13,000

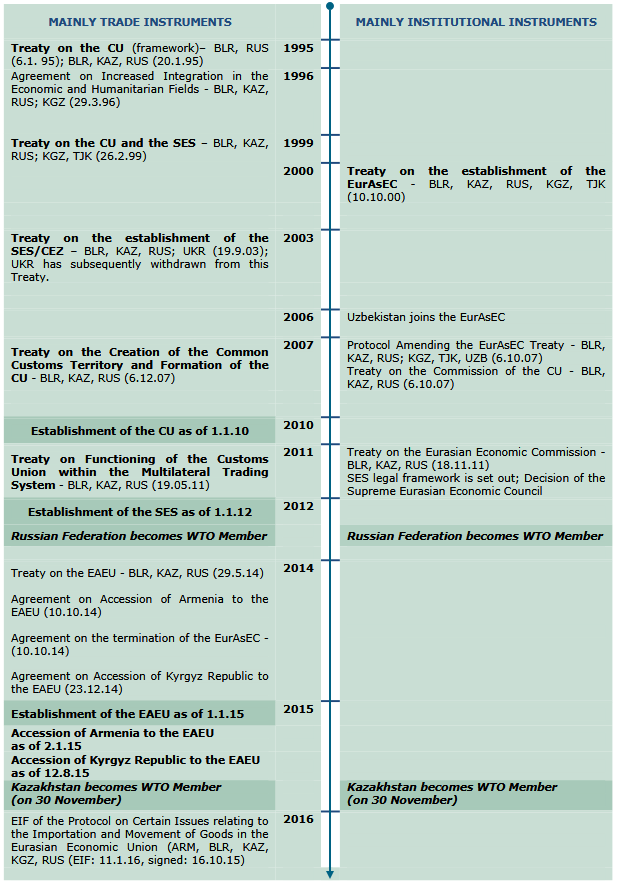
Timeline of EAEU Integration from the World Trade Organization report.

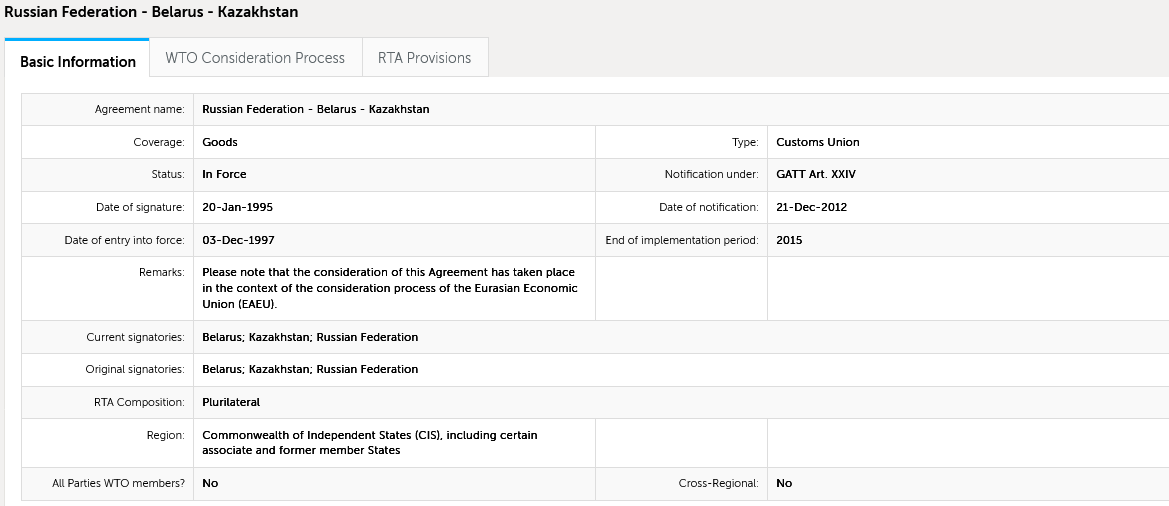
Regional Trade Agreements Database of the World Trade Organization.

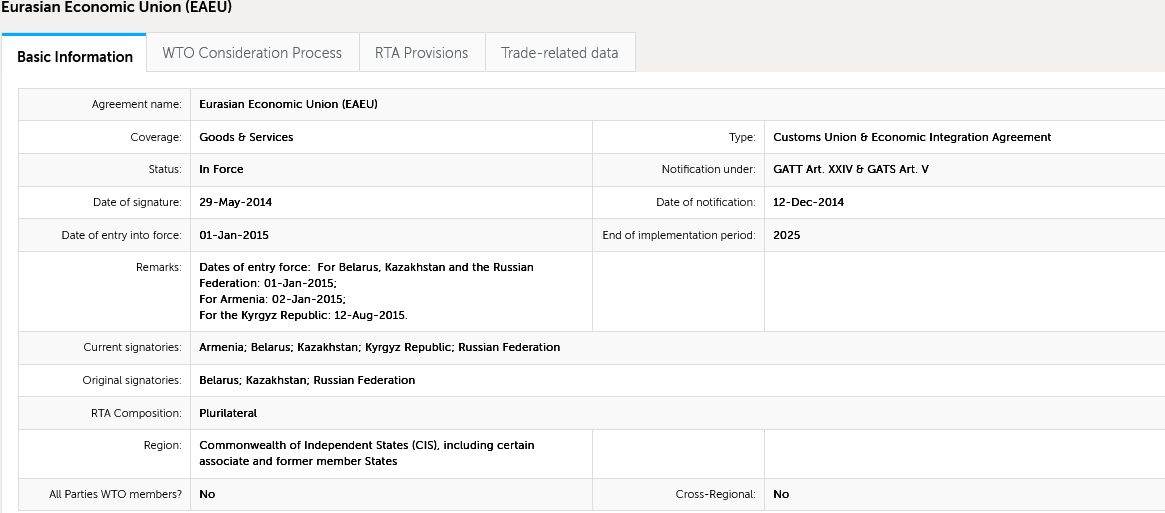
Regional Trade Agreements Database of the World Trade Organization.

The Eurasian Economic Space or Single Economic Space is a single market that provides for the free movement of persons, goods, services and capital within the Eurasian Economic Union. The Single Economic Space was established in 2012 with the goal of creating an integrated single market. It is inspired by the European Internal market and the European Economic Area.

The Eurasian Economic Space initially consisted of Belarus, Kazakhstan, and Russia, and was enlarged to include Armenia and Kyrgyzstan from 1 January 2015. The original treaty establishing the Single Economic Space was terminated by the agreement establishing the Eurasian Economic Union, signed in 2014, which incorporated the economic space into the EEU's legal framework.

The Economic Space was established after Belarus, Kazakhstan and Russia had removed all customs borders in July 2011 through the Eurasian Customs Union. The Single Economic Space aimed to promote further economic integration. The creation of the Eurasian Economic Space was guaranteed by three different treaties. The first treaty in 2003 guaranteeing its creation, the second in 2007 guaranteeing its formation and the third in 2011 announced the establishment of the economic space and the formation of the common market.

== Member states of the Eurasian Economic Space ==
- Armenia (2015)
- Belarus (2012)
- Kazakhstan (2012)
- Kyrgyzstan (2015)
- Russia (2012)

== See also ==
- Eurasian Economic Union
- Eurasian Customs Union
