= Commonwealth of Independent States Agreement on Free Trade in Services, Establishment, Operations and Investment =

The Agreement on Free Trade in Services, Establishment, Operations and Investment (Russian: Соглашение о свободной торговле услугами, учреждении, деятельности и осуществлении инвестиций) is an international agreement on the creation a free trade regime in services and investment signed by 7 post-Soviet states namely Russia, Armenia, Belarus, Kyrgyzstan, Kazakhstan, Tajikistan and Uzbekistan on 8 June 2023, at a meeting of the Commonwealth of Independent States (CIS) in Sochi, Russia to partly integrate Uzbekistan and Tajikistan on the common standards of the WTO (General Agreement on Trade in Services) and the EAEU (some provisions were borrowed from EAEU law) even without their membership in the WTO (Uzbekistan) or the EAEU (Uzbekistan and Tajikistan). It entered into force for Kyrgyzstan, Belarus and Tajikistan on 5 June 2024. It entered into force for Russia on 24 July 2024. On 14 October 2024, Armenia notified of its ratification of the Agreement and it entered into force for Armenia on 13 November 2024. On 22 May 2026, Uzbekistan notified of its ratification of the Agreement and it entered into force for Uzbekistan on 21 June 2026.

On 15 December 2025, Russia notified the World Trade Organization of the Agreement.

The parties to the agreement are guaranteed predictable and understandable conditions of access to the markets of financial, transport, construction, tourism, educational and other service sectors. The Commonwealth countries have been developing the document for 11 years. The Agreement is open for accession by other countries, and not only from the Commonwealth. The document will enter into force one month after its ratification with at least three member states. The document pays special attention to financial services (banking, insurance services, securities-related services), since they are really the "blood of the economy", as well as telecommunications services. Like almost all other CIS agreements, the Agreement does not regulate relations with third countries and does not restrict the conclusion of other agreements. The Information and Analytical Department of the CIS Executive Committee notes in October 2023 that at the moment a kind of pyramid of integration entities has developed in the CIS countries, differing in the depth of economic integration (multi-speed integration), and the implementation of free trade agreements and a number of other documents will lead to the formation of a full-fledged common economic space within the Commonwealth. Within its participant countries, state borders will cease to be an obstacle to the free movement of goods, services, labor and capital. At the moment, there is a simplification of the movement of labor in the CIS countries (see Mobility rights arrangements of the Commonwealth of Independent States), but complete freedom of movement without a work permit exists only in the EAEU.

== Negotiations ==
Andrey Kushnirenko, Deputy Head of the Economic Development Department of the CIS Executive Committee, stated in 2021 that the Agreement would provide for the liberalization of trade in services as much as possible today and would determine the procedure for CIS companies to operate in the markets of other CIS countries and investment protection, as well as establish dispute settlement procedures. The parties also fix the restrictions on trade in services existing in national legislation and undertake not to tighten them for each other (ratchet effect). Then the countries participating in the agreement will gradually remove these restrictions. "Nine countries are participating in the negotiations on the new agreement. Ukraine is among them, but it is only formally present. Kiev, one of the initiators of the negotiations on free trade in services, actively worked in this direction until 2014. Then they appeared irregularly, in recent years they did not indicate his position at all. Negotiations are quite difficult. The CIS countries that participate in the negotiations, but are not members of the EAEU, want the degree of opening of the services market to be similar to the "Eurasian" one, but for this they must join the Union. Other CIS countries, having joined the WTO, have already opened their market of services to its members very significantly." he said. Not all CIS participants are members of the World Trade Organization and members of the Eurasian Economic Union. Until now, there has not been a common document that would regulate trade in services among countries. The EAEU Treaty regulates the provision of services among its members (only 5 CIS participants), and the WTO GATS regulates the provision of services among its members (only 7 CIS participants).

"We are confident that after the entry into force of the agreement, the number of companies operating in the service sector will increase, which will establish their subsidiaries in the CIS countries, and the volume of cross-border trade in services will increase. Preferential conditions will be created for companies of the Commonwealth countries, so competition for other countries will become tougher. We do not exclude that eventually prices for services in the CIS countries will become lower. If, relatively speaking, only Tajik notaries provided notary services in the Tajik market, this is one picture. When interested notaries from all CIS countries will be able to come to this country, it's completely different. In this case, tougher competition will lead to the fact that the services themselves will become cheaper." Andrey Kushnirenko said.

== Signing ==
The agreement was signed by the heads of governments of Russia, Armenia, Belarus, Kyrgyzstan, Kazakhstan, Tajikistan and Uzbekistan on 8 June 2023 in Sochi, Russia.

Maxim Reshetnikov, the Minister of Economic Development of the Russian Federation, said “Today's agreements should naturally complement the preferences for trade in goods and stimulate the growth of trade turnover between our countries. On the one hand, the document directly regulates services, and on the other – the development of two important sectors of economy: industry and agriculture. Such regulation will stimulate the growth of mutual investments, the development of industrial relations, and the formation of new value chains. Working conditions for investors will be no worse than those for local entrepreneurs or investors from third countries. At the same time, we have identified a list of sensitive sectors in which each of the countries can maintain restrictions for foreign companies. For our states, these are opportunities to strengthen integration and attract more investment. For business – the most transparent and understandable rules for working in the markets of the Commonwealth countries. For citizens – better services for a lower price against the background of increased competition among companies”.

Russia will retain the right to apply the current legislation to restrict foreign investment in strategic companies. Tajikistan will retain the right to restrict foreign investment in the mining industry. Uzbekistan – in the field of electricity, nuclear energy, mechanical engineering and others. Experts expect that the new agreements in the service and investment sector will increase the trade turnover of the CIS countries by 1.1% in the short term – about 81.3 billion rubles, and mutual trade in services of the parties to the agreement – by 8% or 78.8 billion rubles.

“In addition, in order to deepen trade and economic ties with the CIS partners, we have also included a number of EAEU law provisions in the Agreement. This document is of particular importance in the context of cooperation with the countries that are not EAEU members – such as Tajikistan and Uzbekistan. We expect to get the most tangible results from the implementation of the Agreement with these countries.” - said Alesya Abramenko, Deputy Minister of Economy of the Republic of Belarus.

== See also ==
- Commonwealth of Independent States
- Economic integration
- Eurasian Economic Union
- Free trade areas in Europe
- Post-Soviet states
- Trade bloc
- Rules of Origin
- Market access
- Free-trade area
- Tariff
