= Economy of Kazakhstan =

- Capital city Astana is the economic centre of Kazakhstan
- Currency: Tenge (KZT, ₸)
- Fiscal year: Calendar year
- Trade organizations: WTO, CIS, EAEU, EACU, ECO, SCO, CISFTA
- Country group: Developing/Emerging; Upper-middle income economy

Statistics
- Population: ▲20,590,000 (2026)
- GDP: ▲$403.527 billion (nominal, 2026f); ▲$996.311 billion (PPP, 2026f)
- GDP rank: 48th (nominal, 2026); 36th (PPP, 2026)
- GDP growth: 4.8% (2024); 5.6% (2025)
- GDP per capita: ▲$19,311 (nominal, 2026f); ▲$48,351 (PPP, 2026f)
- GDP per capita rank: 67th (nominal, 2026); 49th(PPP, 2026)
- GDP per capita growth: 5.2% (real; 2025)
- GDP by sector: agriculture: 4.7%; industry: 34.1%; services: 61.2%; (2017 est.)
- Inflation (CPI): ▼9.3% (2026f)
- Population below national poverty line: 2.5% (2017); ▼4.5% on less than $6.85/day (2021)
- Gini coefficient: ▲29.2 low (2021)
- Human Development Index: ▲0.859; very high (2026)
- Corruption Perceptions Index: ▲39 out of 100 points (2023, 93rd rank)
- Labor force: ▲9,262,539 (2019); ▲95.4% employment rate (2026)
- Labor force by occupation: agriculture: 18.1%; industry: 20.4%; services: 61.6%; (2017 est.)
- Unemployment: ▼4.6% (2026 est.); 5% (2017 est.)
- Average gross salary: ₸ 473 158 (US$1,003) per month
- Average net salary: ₸ 387 600 (US$821) per month
- Main industries: oil, coal, iron ore, manganese, chromite, lead, zinc, copper, titanium, bauxite, gold, silver, phosphates, information technology, sulfur, uranium, iron and steel; tractors and other agricultural machinery, electric motors, construction materials

External
- Exports: ▼$87.2 billion (2024)
- Export goods: oil and oil products, natural gas, ferrous metals, chemicals, machinery, grain, wool, meat, coal
- Main export partners: EU 37.29%; Italy 7.08%; Netherlands 6.05%; Greece 4.46%; China 17.2%; EEU 12.65%; Russia 10.9%; Kyrgyzstan 1.49%; United Kingdom 6.73%; Switzerland 4.25%; Turkey 4.24%; Uzbekistan 3.28% (2024)
- Imports: ▲$70 billion (2024)
- Import goods: machinery and equipment, metal products, foodstuffs
- Main import partners: China 31.7%; EEU 27.92%; Russia 26.1%; Belarus 1.06%; EU 17.47%; Germany 4.43%; France 2.24%; Turkey 4.72%; South Korea 3.55%; United States 2.41%; Uzbekistan 1.83% (2024)
- FDI stock: ▲US$4.58 Billion (31 December 2017 est.)
- Current account: ▲ −US$7.86 billion (2021 est.)
- Gross external debt: ▲$165.8 billion (31 December 2020 est.)

Public finance
- Government debt: ▼11.4% of GDP (2024 est.)
- Foreign reserves: ▲$45 billion (February 2025 est.)
- Budget balance: −2.7% (of GDP) (2025)
- Revenue: US$40.95 billion (2025 est.)
- Spending: US$48.2 billion (2025 est.)
- Credit rating: Standard & Poor's: BBB-; Outlook: Negative; (2011); Moody's: Baa2; Outlook: Stable; (2011); Fitch: BBB; Outlook: Stable; (2022)
- All values, unless otherwise stated, are in US dollars.

Kazakhstan has a developing economy that is considered upper-middle income. It is the largest in Central Asia in both absolute and per capita terms. As of 2023, the nation has attracted more than US$370 billion of foreign investments since becoming an independent republic after the dissolution of the former Soviet Union. It possesses oil reserves as well as minerals and metals. Almost every known element on the periodic table can be found in Kazakhstan. It also has considerable agricultural potential, with its vast steppe lands accommodating both livestock and grain production. The mountains in the south are important for apples and walnuts; both species grow wild there. Kazakhstan's industrial sector rests on the extraction and processing of these natural resources.

The dissolution of the Soviet Union and the collapse of demand for Kazakhstan's traditional heavy industry products have resulted in a sharp decline of the economy since 1991, with the steepest annual decline occurring in 1994. In 1995–97 the pace of the government program of economic reform and privatization quickened, resulting in a substantial shifting of assets into the private sector. Kazakhstan was granted "market economy country" status by the European Union and the United States, in 2000 and 2002 respectively.

GDP per capita shrank by 26% in the 1990s. Kazakhstan's economy turned downward in 1998 with a 2.5% decline in GDP growth due to slumping oil prices and the August financial crisis in Russia. In the 2000s, Kazakhstan's economy grew sharply, aided by increased prices on world markets for Kazakhstan's leading exports: oil, metals and grain. GDP grew 9.6% in 2000, up from 1.7% in 1999. In 2006, extremely high GDP growth had been sustained, and grew by 10.6%. The increased economic growth also led to a turn-around in government finances, with the budget moving from a cash deficit of 3.7% of GDP in 1999 to 0.1% surplus in 2000. The country experienced a slowdown in economic growth from 2014, sparked by falling oil prices and the effects of the Russo-Ukrainian War.

== History ==
Before Soviet times, there was barely any industry or large-scale agriculture in the country. Most residents were either steppe nomads or pastoralists. While the USSR managed to create thriving industries and brought agriculture to Kazakhstan, these developments came at great costs. Forced collectivization of farms, bureaucratic restrictions, highly centralized economic planning and an excessive focus on heavy industry caused both structural and workforce issues for the Kazakh economy.

Stalin's push for greater industrialization throughout the Soviet Union was heeded without opposition in the country. During his leadership, Central Asia experienced rapid yet chaotic industrial growth and agricultural restructuring, including the Kazakh SSR. In the 1930s and 1940s, major investments were poured into the Kazakh SSR to build transportation networks to link the country via road and rail. Many industrial manufacturing plants were built throughout the country, pertaining to metallurgy, oil and gas production, chemical processing, defense equipment and wheat processing. Upon the start of the Second World War, many large factories located on the Eastern Front (World War II) were shifted to the Kazakh SSR, to protect the USSR's industrial lifelines. This would prove vital for the USSR's victory as well as for the Kazakh economy. The Semipalatinsk Nuclear Test Site and Baikonur Cosmodrome were also built here, with Baikonur being the iconic launch site for many prominent Soviet space explorations.

After the war, the Virgin Lands Campaign was started in 1953. This was led by Nikita Khrushchev, with the goal of developing the previously uncultivated lands of the republic and helping to boost Soviet agricultural yields. However, since it did not work as promised, the campaign was eventually abandoned in the 1960s. The Kazakh SSR did eventually become a key regional producer of wheat, beet and cotton.

The Kazakh SSR arguably saw its best days under Dinmukhamed Kunaev, who not only brought significant economic expansion but also managed to foster political autonomy from Moscow. He oversaw a rapid expansion in the country's material prosperity, industrial capacity and social status. The Kazakh SSR became an efficient exporter of valuable raw and processed goods, eventually becoming the third largest economy of the USSR. During the tumultuous era of Gorbachev's policies of Perestroika and Glasnost, the economy stagnated and left many citizens disappointed. The economic discontent, coupled with growing nationalism among the elites and youth, would lead to the downfall of Soviet rule in Kazakhstan.

== Macro-economic trend ==
Kazakhstan's GDP (PPP) per capita

In the 2014 Economic Freedom Index published by The Heritage Foundation in Washington, D.C., Kazakhstan has gained 22 points over the past 17 years, which is noted by the authors as among the 20 best improvements recorded by any country. Kazakhstan's economic freedom score is 69.1, equalling "moderately free". Its overall score has increased by 0.1 point, with significant improvements in investment freedom and government integrity offsetting steep declines in fiscal health and monetary freedom. Kazakhstan is ranked 11th among 43 countries in the Asia–Pacific region, and its overall score is above the regional and world averages.

According to the World Bank’s latest Kazakhstan economic update – Economic Recovery During Challenging Times (spring, 2023), the economy is set to experience a moderate growth acceleration, with real GDP forecast to rise by 3.5 percent in 2023 and 4 percent in 2024 supported largely by the hydrocarbons sector as oil production increases. In the 2023 Economic Freedom Index published by The Heritage Foundation in Washington, D.C., Kazakhstan ranks 71st out of 176 countries, falling in the group of "moderately free" countries. Kazakhstan's economic freedom score is 62.1. Kazakhstan ranks 13th out of 39 countries in the Asia–Pacific region, and its overall score is above the world and regional averages.

This chart shows trends in the gross domestic product of Kazakhstan at market prices estimated by the International Monetary Fund, with figures in millions of tenge.

Year	Gross domestic product (millions ₸)	US$ exchange rate	Inflationindex (2000=100)	Per capita income (as % of USA)
1995	78,014,200	T 61.11	64	3.81
2000	102,599,902	T 142.26	100	3.53
2005	147,453,000	T 132.88	140	9.01
2017	159,406,930	₸344.18		

The following table shows the main economic indicators in 1980–2023. Inflation under 5% is in green.

Year	GDP (in bn. US$ PPP)	GDP per capita (in US$ PPP)	GDP (in bn. US$ nominal)	GDP growth (real)	Inflation rate (in Percent)	Unemployment (in Percent)	Government debt (in % of GDP)
1992	120.2	7,052	2.9	n/a	n/a	n/a	n/a
1993	▼111.8	▼6,613	▲5.2	▼−9.2%	▲1,662.3%	n/a	n/a
1994	▼99.8	▼6,315	▲11.9	▼−12.6%	▼1,402.0%	10.1%	n/a
1995	▼93.5	▼5,966	▲16.6	▼−8.2%	▼176.3%	▲11.0%	n/a
1996	▲95.7	▲6,183	▲21.0	▲0.5%	▼39.1%	▲13.0%	n/a
1997	▲99.0	▲6,519	▲22.2	▲1.7%	▼17.4%	13.0%	n/a
1998	▼98.2	▲6,568	▼22.1	▼−1.9%	▼7.3%	▲13.1%	n/a
1999	▲102.3	▲6,865	▼16.9	▲2.7%	▲8.4%	▲13.5%	n/a
2000	▲114.9	▲7,727	▲18.3	▲9.8%	▲13.3%	▲12.8%	n/a
2001	▲133.3	▲8,977	▲22.2	▲13.5%	▼8.4%	▼10.4%	n/a
2002	▲148.7	▲9,999	▲24.6	▲9.8%	▼5.9%	▼9.3%	17.6%
2003	▲165.7	▲11,082	▲30.8	▲9.3%	▲6.5%	▼8.8%	▼15.0%
2004	▲186.5	▲12,370	▲43.2	▲9.6%	▲6.9%	▼8.4%	▼11.4%
2005	▲211.0	▲13,862	▲57.1	▲9.7%	▲7.5%	▼8.1%	▼8.1%
2006	▲240.8	▲15,637	▲81.0	▲10.7%	▲8.6%	▼7.8%	▼6.7%
2007	▲269.3	▲17,293	▲104.9	▲8.9%	▲10.8%	▼7.3%	▼5.9%
2008	▲283.5	▲17,737	▲133.4	▲3.3%	▲17.1%	▼6.6%	▲6.8%
2009	▲288.7	▲17,819	▼115.3	▲1.2%	▼7.3%	6.6%	▲10.2%
2010	▲313.5	▲19,071	▲148.0	▲7.3%	▼7.1%	▼5.8%	▲10.7%
2011	▲344.0	▲20,634	▲192.6	▲7.5%	▲8.3%	▼5.4%	▼10.1%
2012	▲369.9	▲21,878	▲208.0	▲5.0%	▼5.1%	▼5.3%	▲12.1%
2013	▲417.5	▲24,326	▲236.6	▲5.9%	▲5.8%	▼5.2%	▲12.6%
2014	▲427.5	▲24,545	▼221.4	▲4.3%	▲6.7%	▼5.0%	▲14.5%
2015	▼407.4	▼23,057	▼184.4	▲1.0%	6.7%	5.0%	▲21.9%
2016	▲423.8	▲23,654	▼137.3	▲0.9%	▲14.6%	▼4.9%	▼19.6%
2017	▲448.5	▲24,699	▲166.8	▲3.9%	▼7.4%	4.9%	▲19.9%
2018	▲478.1	▲25,989	▲179.3	▲4.1%	▼6.0%	▼4.8%	▲20.2%
2019	▲508.6	▲27,295	▲181.7	▲4.5%	▼5.2%	4.8%	▼19.9%
2020	▼501.8	▼26,582	▼171.1	▼−2.6%	▲6.8%	▲4.9%	▲26.4%
2021	▲545.8	▲27,987	▲197.1	▲4.1%	▲8.0%	▼4.9%	▼25.1%
2022	▲603.3	▲30,523	▲225.5	▲3.3%	▲15.0%	4.9%	▼23.5%
2023	▲654.1	▲32,712	▲259.3	▲4.6%	15.0%	▼4.8%	▼23.4%
2024	▲783.6	▲39,379	▲291.4	▲5.0%	▼8.7%	4.8%	▲24.4%
2025	▲923.4	▲45,310	▲306.2	▲6.5%	▲11.4%	4.8%	▲25.2%

== Economic growth and GDP ==
According to the World Bank, Kazakhstan's economy grew by 5.1% in H1 2023, driven by exports and fiscal stimulus. GDP is projected to grow by 4.5% in 2023 and subsequent years, aided by new oil production coming on-stream.

Kazakhstan's economy recorded an average real GDP growth rate of 3.0% in the decade to 2022, above the 2.5% average for Eastern Europe. In 2022, real GDP growth was 3.3%. The official estimate for Kazakhstan's GDP was $512 billion at the end of 2022 in purchasing power parity terms.

The country devalued its currency by 19% in February 2014. The country experienced a slowdown in economic growth from 2014 sparked by falling oil prices and the effects of the 2014 Russo-Ukrainian War.

The Government of Kazakhstan signed a Framework Partnership Agreement with IBRD, IFC, MIGA on 1 May 2014; according to this Agreement the World Bank will allocate US$2.5 billion to Kazakhstan, for the diversification of the economy and reaching the sustainable development.

The World Bank report shows that Kazakhstan, as of 2015, reached the level of an upper-middle-income country with a GDP of US$170 billion.

Another 22% devaluation occurred in August 2015.

Foreign direct investment increased 30 percent in 2015 in Kazakhstan's agricultural industry and 80 percent in the country's petroleum products sector.

In 2016 Kazakhstan's economy started to recover from the crisis caused by low oil prices and the tenge devaluation. According to the Minister of National Economy of Kazakhstan, in nine months of 2016 the GDP growth reached 0.4%. Sectors of economy that experienced the highest growth included construction (6.9%), agriculture (4.9%), and transport sector (4.0%).

The GDP per capita in current US$ in Kazakhstan declined by about 40% between 2013 and 2017.

Kazakhstan was ranked 25th out of 190 countries in the World Bank's Doing Business 2020 report. The country improved its position by 3 points, from 28 to 25, in the 2020 ranking compared to the previous year. This placed Kazakhstan ahead of countries such as Iceland (26th place), Austria (27th place), Russia (28th place), Japan (29th place), etc.

Kazakhstan has prioritized the development of non-oil sectors of economy, which accounted for 85% of the country's economic growth in 2019.

The biggest growth in 2020 occurred in the automotive industry (+53.6%), pharmaceuticals (+39.7%), processed metal products (+19.5%), mechanical engineering (+16.5%), as well as in light industry (+16.4%). The industries in the service sector that demonstrated growth included construction (+10.7%) and information and communications (+8.2%).

The World Bank reported that Kazakhstan's economy recorded a gross domestic product (GDP) growth of 3.2% in 2022. This was a part of the trend where the economy was projected to grow by 3.9% in 2023, driven mainly by the hydrocarbons sector and increased oil production.

== Sectors of economy ==
=== Primary ===
==== Agriculture ====
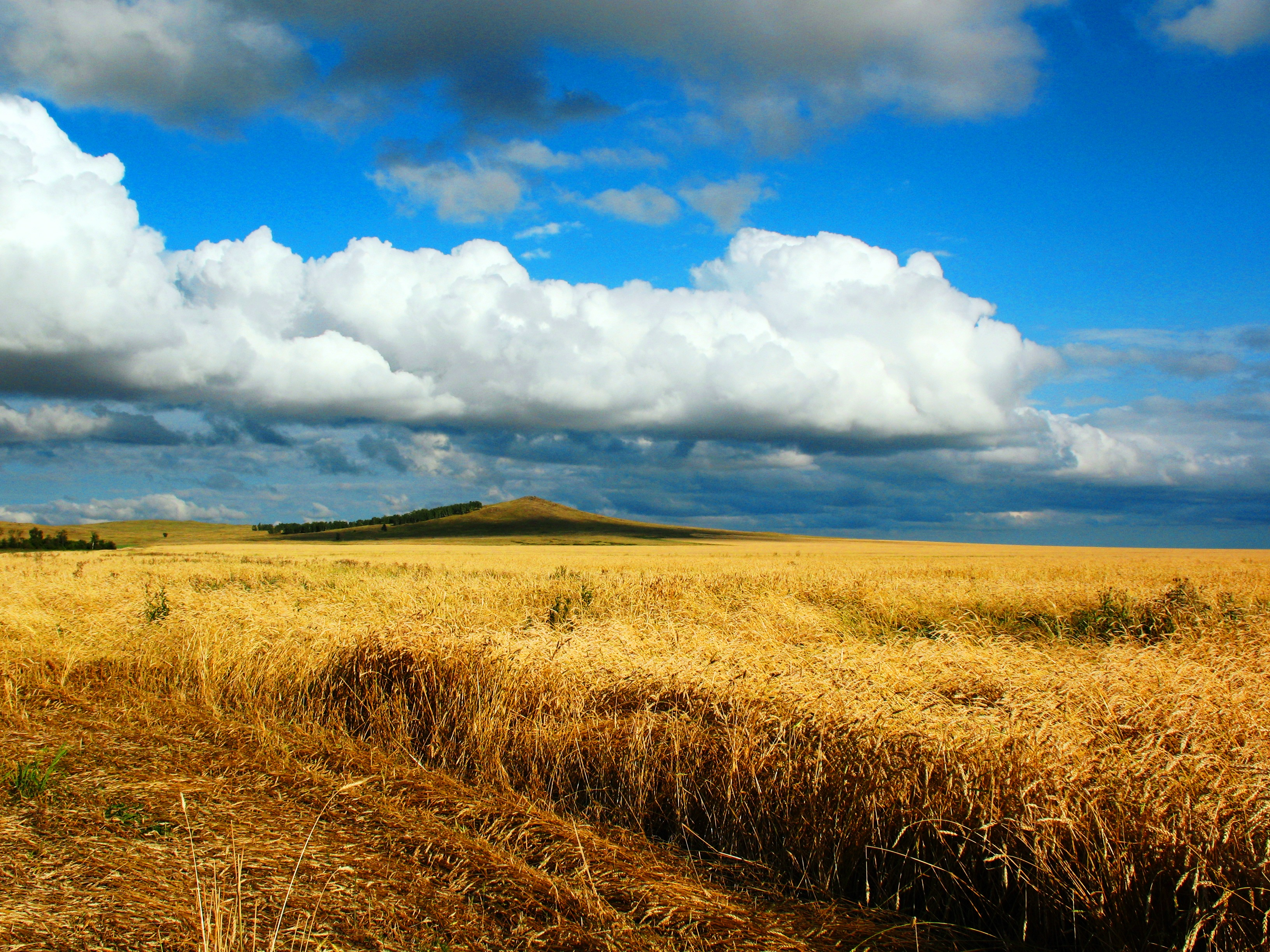
Grain fields near Kokshetau

Agriculture in Kazakhstan remains a small scale sector of Kazakhstan's economy. Agriculture's contribution to the GDP is under 10% – it was recorded as 6.7%, and as occupying only 20% of labor. At the same time, more than 70% of its land is occupied in crops and animal husbandry. Kazakhstan has the highest cropland area per capita in the world, followed by Australia and Canada. Compared to North America, a relatively small percentage of land is used for crops, with the percentage being higher in the north of the country. 70% of the agricultural land is permanent pastureland.

Kazakhstan's largest crop is wheat, which it exports. It ranks as the sixth largest wheat producer in the world. Minor crops include barley, cotton, sugar beets, sunflowers, flax, and rice. Agricultural lands in Kazakhstan were depleted of their nutrients during the Virgin Lands Campaign during the Soviet era. This continues to affect production today. Kazakh wine is produced in the mountains east of Almaty.

In 2011 the country had achieved record grain harvests of 26.9 million tons, exceeding the previous record of 21mn tons recorded in 2009. For 2012, the Kazakh Agriculture Ministry cut the crop forecast to only 14 million tons because of dry weather.

Animals raised in Kazakhstan include cattle, chickens, sheep, pigs, horses and goats (in descending order of numbers). Meat production in tons was highest in cows, pork, mutton, chicken, and "other meat". Wool, cow milk, and eggs are the other major animal products of the country.

In March 2015 the Minister of Agriculture of Kazakhstan said that Kazakhstan had almost doubled agricultural production in the past 5 years. He also noted that the agricultural exports had increased by 1.6 times during that period and had reached US$3 billion.

On July 23, 2015, the Kazakhstan Vice Minister of Agriculture said that within the framework of the law "On Agricultural Cooperation" a special tax regime would be introduced for agricultural cooperatives. This initiative is expected to contribute to the development of the agricultural sector of Kazakhstan.

From 1995 to 2015 Kazakhstan's volume of agricultural production has increased by 41%. Agricultural exports were worth $379 million in 2015, reports the Ministry of Agriculture. Investment in Kazakh agriculture increased 50% in 2016 totaling 228 billion tenge (US$686.96 million) compared to 148 billion tenge (US$445.92 million) a year earlier.

==== Energy ====
Kazakhstan is the leading country in the world for uranium production volumes with 35% of global production, and it has the world's second biggest uranium reserves after Australia.

==== Oil and gas ====
Oil and gas is the leading economic sector. In 2000, Kazakhstan produced 35,252,000 metric tons of oil (700,000 barrels per day), a 17.4% increase over 1999's 30,025,000 tons. It exported 28,883,000 tons of oil in 2000, up 38.8% from 20,813,000 tons in 1999. Production in 2001 has been growing at roughly 20%, on target to meet the government's forecast of 40,100,000 tons of oil (800,000 barrels per day). In 2000, production reached 11.5 km^{3} of natural gas, up from 8.2 km^{3} in 1999.

Kazakhstan has the potential to be a world-class oil exporter in the medium term. The landmark foreign investment in Kazakhstan is the TengizChevroil joint venture, owned 50% by ChevronTexaco, 25% by ExxonMobil, 20% by KazMunaiGas of Kazakhstan, and 5% by LukArco of Russia. The Karachaganak natural gas and gas condensate field is being developed by BG, Agip, ChevronTexaco, and Lukoil. The Agip-led Offshore Kazakhstan Consortium has discovered potentially huge Kashagan oil field in the northern Caspian. Kazakhstan's economic future is linked to oil and gas development. GDP growth will depend on the price of oil, as well as the ability to develop new deposits.

January 2022 began with thousands of people returning to the streets of Kazakhstan to protest against the surging gas prices, recording four straight days of demonstrations, which is claimed to be the biggest protests to have taken place in the oil-rich country in decades. Protesters invaded into government buildings and took over police vehicles despite a strict emergency led by the state being in place.

==== Mining ====
Kazakhstan is a leading producer of many mineral commodities, including salt, uranium, ferrochrome, titanium sponge, cadmium, potash, magnesium, rhenium, copper, bauxite, gallium and zinc.

The country was the world's largest producer of uranium in 2022. In 2019, the country was the world's 10th largest producer of gold; 11th largest world producer of copper; 3rd largest worldwide producer of chromium; 9th largest world producer of bauxite; 9th largest world producer of zinc; 10th largest worldwide producer of antimony; 12th largest world producer of iron ore; 12th largest world producer of lead; 14th largest world producer of manganese; 17th largest world producer of phosphate; 6th largest world producer of bismuth, and the 7th largest world producer of sulfur.

==== Raw materials ====
The main producer of cotton pulp in Kazakhstan is Khlopkoprom. Judging by a number of transactions, its products have been supplied to gunpowder manufacturers in the Russian Federation since 2022. Most of the factories that imported pulp from Kazakhstan for the manufacture of explosives are under US and Ukrainian sanctions. According to OCCRP, Vlast, and iStories, a significant increase in Kazakhstan's exports of cotton pulp and derivatives to the Russian Federation after February 24, 2022, was identified. Exported components are key in the manufacture of explosives and gunpowder. There are contracts for the supply of raw materials to the Kazan Gunpowder Plant from Kazakhstan until 2026, and to the Aleksinsky Chemical Plant (which also produces gunpowder) until 2024.

=== Industry ===
==== Automotive ====
In June 2014, the CKD (Complete Knock-Down) assembly of Toyota Fortuner was launched in Kostanay, Kazakhstan. The expected annual output makes around 3,000 cars.

The Kazakhstan's car industry was developing rapidly in 2014 producing US$2 billion worth of products annually. Unfortunately, the industry experienced a decline despite high hopes, with sales dwindling to only 47,000 in 2016.

In 2020, the Kazakh economy observed the biggest growth in its automotive industry, which saw a 53.6% growth, despite the COVID-19 pandemic.

The ongoing state support for the domestic auto industry, primarily through recycling fees, is a contentious issue. For 20 years, the industry has largely operated as a mere assembly hub, importing spare parts from abroad and performing basic assembly tasks, such as fitting wheels—hardly advancing towards establishing a truly Kazakh brand in the automotive sector. This situation has fostered public dissent, notably from groups like #Нетутильсбору [no recycling fee], who argue that such policies unfairly prioritize industry support over the needs of regular citizens. This has contributed to an increase in the average age of vehicles across Kazakhstan, as newer, affordable options remain inaccessible for many. The group's primary demands include the abolition of these recycling fees and a redirection of support towards more pressing public needs, challenging the continued governmental support that, they argue, effectively "mummifies" an unproductive industry.

==== Manufacturing ====
GE Transportation acquired 50% stake in JSC Lokomotiv in a joint venture with Kazakhstan's national railway company Kazakhstan Temir Joly.

=== Services ===
==== Education ====
Kazakhstan's 1995 constitution provides mandatory, socialized secondary school education. Citizens compete for socialized institutions of higher learning. Private education is increasing in the country, with about 5% of students enrolled in the private schools that remain largely under arbitrary state control.

In 2000, the government of Kazakhstan joined the governments of the Kyrgyz Republic and Tajikistan, and the Aga Khan to establish the world’s first internationally chartered institution of higher education, the University of Central Asia (UCA). The UCA will have three campuses of equal size and stature in each of the founding countries. The Kazakh campus is under construction in Tekeli in the Zhetysu region, 35 minutes east of the regional capital Taldykorgan, and three hours by car from Almaty. The UCA will benefit from the resources of the Aga Khan Development Network to offer an internationally recognized standard of higher education in Central Asia. Currently, the University operates a School of Professional and Continuing Education (SPCE), with a School of Undergraduate Studies and a Graduate School of Development in the process of being established.

In 2002 Asian Development Bank provided technical assistance to Kazakhstan to identify key issues and priorities in the education sector and to contribute to strengthening the government's education sector development strategy. The United States provided 137 Peace Corps members to "work in education and NGO development" in 2004.

Kazakhstan has a 99.1% literacy rate for males and 97.7% for females as of 1999.

When United States Secretary of State Condoleezza Rice visited Kazakhstan from 12–13 October 2006, she said "The future of any state depends on its level of education. This is my fourth visit to Kazakhstan, I have already been to Atyrau and Almaty and I have been able to see for myself the high level of education of your nation, which is a key to success of any country."

The Human Rights Measurement Initiative (HRMI) finds that Kazakhstan is fulfilling only 81.0% of what it should be fulfilling for the right to education based on the country's level of income. HRMI breaks down the right to education by looking at the rights to both primary education and secondary education. While taking into consideration Kazakhstan's income level, the nation is achieving only 62.2% of what should be possible based on its resources (income) for primary education and 99.8% for secondary education.

==== Healthcare ====
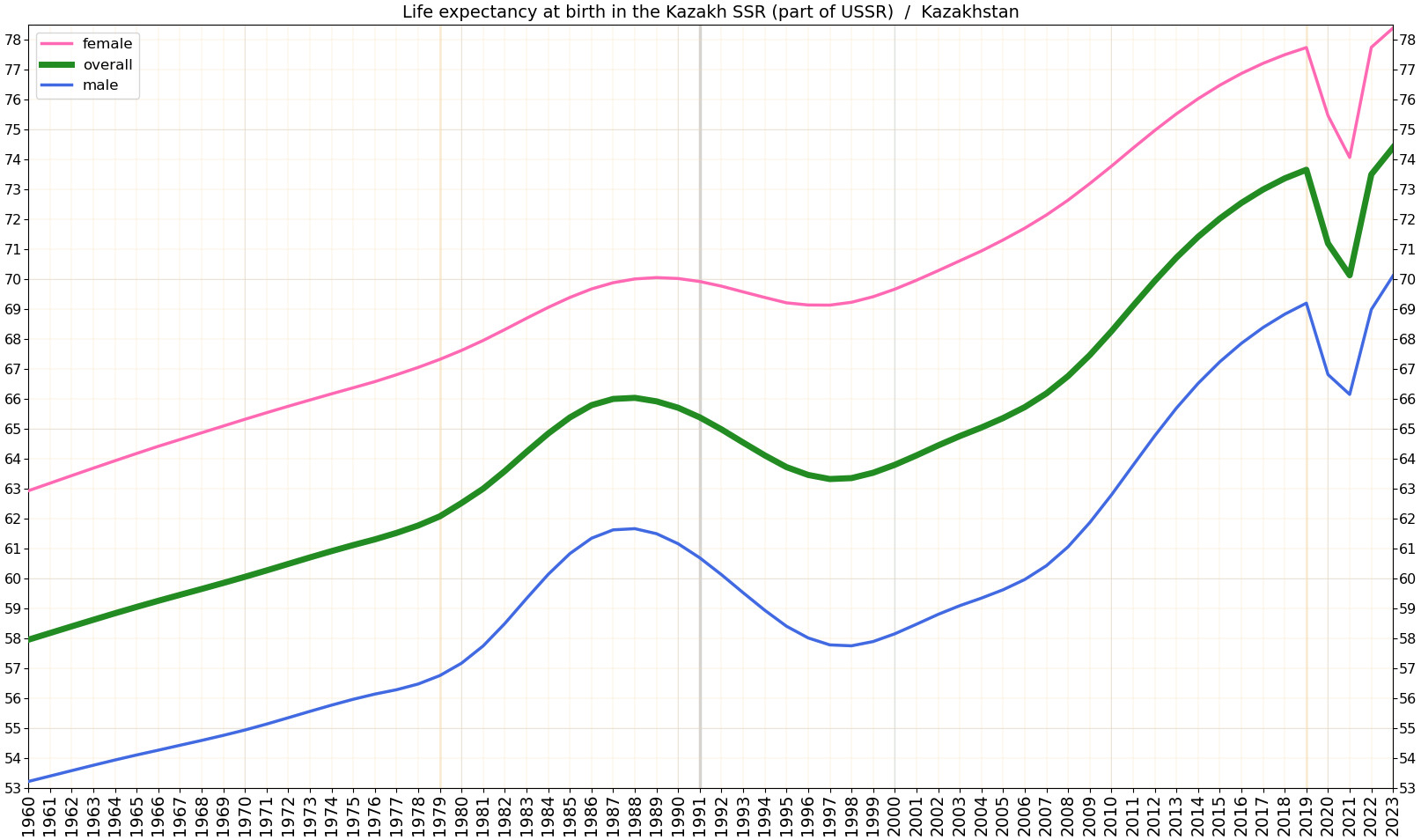
Life expectancy at birth in Kazakhstan

The Healthcare in Kazakhstan is a post-Soviet healthcare system under reform. The World Health Organization (WHO), in 2000, ranked the Kazakhstan's healthcare system as the 64th in overall performance, and 135th by overall level of health (among 191 member nations included in the study).

The country’s recent health reforms aim to progress towards universal health coverage through a strong primary health care and promoting family medicine, particularly in rural and remote areas. Regional and local governments have led these changes, with increased autonomy for primary health facility managers.

There has been two big reform programs since 2000. The National Programme for Healthcare Reform and Development (2005-2010) and the Health Care Development Programme (2011-2015).

The Human Rights Measurement Initiative finds that Kazakhstan is fulfilling 79.7% of what it should be fulfilling for the right to health based on its level of income. When looking at the right to health with respect to children, Kazakhstan achieves 96.1% of what is expected based on its current income. Regarding the right to health among the adult population, the country achieves only 80.9% of what is expected based on the nation's level of income. Kazakhstan falls into the "very bad" category when evaluating the right to reproductive health because the nation is fulfilling only 62.1% of what the nation is expected to achieve based on the resources (income) it has available.

==== Science and technology ====
On 22 December 2014 the World Bank approved a US$88 million loan that would support Kazakhstan's efforts to facilitate commercially and socially viable innovation in technology. The Fostering Productive Innovation Project aims to improve the country in areas that are able to foster and support technological innovation.

Kazakhstan also owned the spaceport Baikonur Cosmodrome, which facilitated International Space Station (ISS) missions.

==== Retail ====
According to A.T. Kearney's 2015 Global Retail Development Index, Kazakhstan ranked 13 out of 30. In the 2016th Index, Kazakhstan ranked as the 4th best developing country for retail investments, scoring 56.5 out of 100.

The largest retail chain in Kazakhstan is Magnum Cash & Carry, which as of 2023, operated more than 180 stores across multiple cities in Kazakhstan. Kazakhstan's market attracted large international retailers, such as French retail chains Carrefour and Leroy Merlin, as well as food giants McDonald's and KFC.

==== Gambling ====
Gambling in Kazakhstan was developing already during the day of Czarist Russia, then lotteries were organized. In 1698, Czar Peter I signed a decree which allowed organized lotteries for the first time. In later years lotteries were organized by the Ministry of Finance of the Union of Soviet Socialist Republics, which included Kazakhstan. The Ministry of Finance of the Republic of Kazakhstan started issuing licenses for gambling activity in 1999.

In 2007 the government of Kazakhstan has introduced a new law which ordered banning gambling on the territory of Kazakhstan besides 2 places which were to become the examples of Russia's special gambling zones. Casinos existing outside these areas had to be closed or moved to places where they could operate legally. The first legal casino opened after the introduction of new law was Casino Flamingo in Kapchagay, which was opened on 1 October 2008.

In 2018, the income of gambling companies in Kazakhstan amounted to ₸19.5 billion. This is 16.1% more than in 2017. Then this amount was at the level of ₸16.8 billion.

==== Housing market ====
As of 2016, the total housing area in Kazakhstan was 342.6 million square metres (3,688 million square feet), an average of 21.4 m^{2} (230 sq ft) per person. The housing area per person increased by 20% in the period from 2005 to 2016, but remained below the UN's recommended standard of 30 square metres (320 square feet) per person.

==== Telecommunications ====
Telecommunications in Kazakhstan include radio, television, fixed and mobile telephones, and the internet.

The largest telecommunications company in Kazakhstan is Kazakhtelecom, which is responsible for infrastructure, such as cables and exchanges, and provides internet, television and telephone connections to individuals and businesses. The state of Kazakhstan is a major shareholder in Kazakhtelecom.

==== Tourism ====
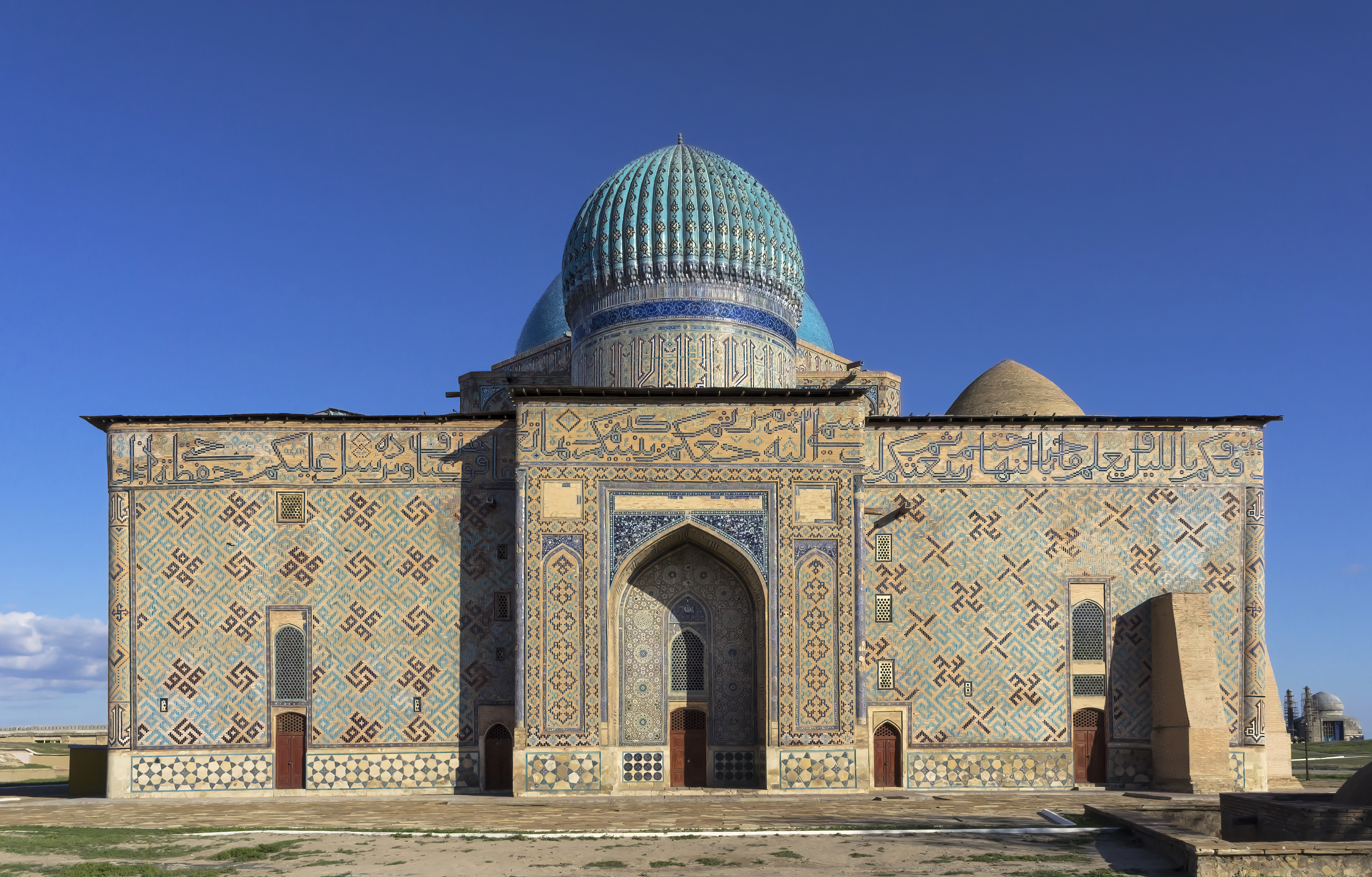
View of Mausoleum of Khoja Ahmed Yasawi

Number of international tourism arrivals in Kazakhstan

Kazakhstan is the ninth-largest country by area and the largest landlocked country in the world. Tourism is not a major component of the economy. As of 2014, tourism has accounted for 0.3% of Kazakhstan GDP, but the government had plans to increase it to 3% by 2020, however due to the COVID-19 pandemic it decreased to 0.34%.

According to the World Economic Forum's Travel and Tourism Competitiveness Report 2017, travel and tourism industry GDP in Kazakhstan is $3.08 billion or 1.6 percent of total GDP. The WEF ranks Kazakhstan 81st in its 2017 report, which is four positions higher compared to the previous period. Kazakhstan received 6.5 million tourists in 2016.

== External trade and investment ==
=== Trade ===
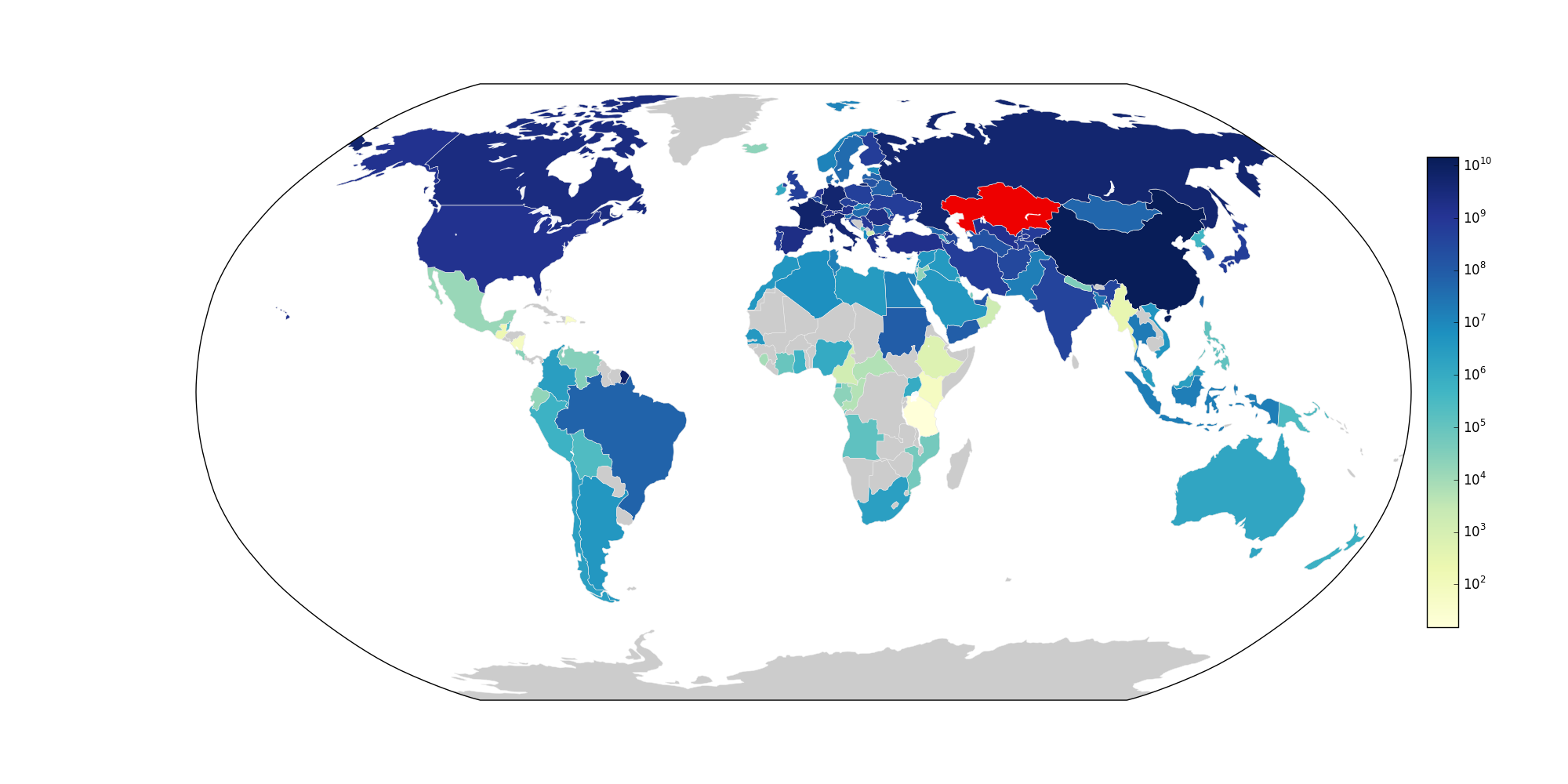
Kazakh export destinations, 2013

Exports of Kazakhstan by product category (2019) Chemical products Transportation Machines Mineral products Plastics and rubbers Metals Foodstuffs Precious metals Textiles Instruments Animal products Vegetable products Paper goods Footwear and headwear Miscellaneous Stone and glass Wood products Animal and vegetable bi-products Animal hides Arts and antiques Weapons

Kazakhstan has 11 transcontinental routes, including rail and road routes, and many oil and gas pipelines. The country's geographic position allows for the transporting of goods from China to Europe three to four times faster than other routes.

Sherin Suzhikova, Counselor of Kazakhstan's Chamber of Commerce and Industry and Chao Yon-chuan, Secretary-General of the Taiwan External Trade Development Council (TAITRA), signed an agreement on 13 October 2006 in Taipei to improve economic relations through "exchanges of market information and visits by trade professionals." TAITRA has an office in Almaty, Kazakhstan.

In 2006, North Dakota's then Lieutenant Governor Jack Dalrymple led an 18-member delegation of the North Dakota Trade Office representing seven North Dakota companies and Dickinson State University on a trip to Kazakhstan, Ukraine and Russia. North Dakota exports mostly machinery to Kazakhstan, the eighth largest destination for North Dakotan exports; machinery exports increased from US$22,000 to US$25 million between 2000 and 2005.

The percentage of high-tech exports (as a share of manufactured exports) from Kazakhstan has grown from just 4.46% in 1995 to 37.17% in 2014. One of the main factors that triggered this growth was the Technology Commercialization Project developed and implemented by the World Bank Group and the Kazakh Government. Through this project, 65 Kazakh tech startups received funding and training helping them get their innovations into markets.

China is Kazakhstan's important trade partner. In late March 2015 the two countries signed 33 deals worth US$23.6 billion. The deals cover different industries, such as oil refining, cars, steel.

Kazakhstan's foreign trade turnover in 2018 comprised $93.5bn that is 19.7% more compared to 2017. The volume of export in the reporting period made $67bn (+25.7%) and import was $32.5bn (+9.9%).

The Government of Kazakhstan has been supporting Kazakhstani exporters operating in foreign markets through their QazTrade incubator. Since September 2019, the program selects businesses and assists them with navigating bureaucracy and connecting to foreign markets the government deems a priority, including Germany, Turkey, the United Arab Emirates, Iran, and China.

=== New economic reforms ===
In his state-of-the-nation address on September 1, 2023, President Kassym-Jomart Tokayev of Kazakhstan unveiled a comprehensive plan focused on economic reforms and the new economic course for the country. Among the key points were industrialization, diversification, a move toward green energy, simplification of tax codes, and a focus on transparency and fairness in governance.

Particular focus will be given to sectors like heavy engineering, uranium enrichment, and automotive components, he noted. Tokayev proposed that in order to support the manufacturing industry, foreign and domestic investors should be exempted from paying taxes and other mandatory payments for the first three years.

On fiscal matters, the President called for a coordination of financial and monetary policies, with the aim of achieving stable economic growth of 6-7 percent. He also emphasized the need to attract foreign banks to boost competition and solve the problem of insufficient corporate lending.

Tokayev further accentuated the need to support small and medium enterprises and accelerate privatization. Changes in legislation will be initiated to encourage consolidation among small businesses, and efforts will be intensified to demonopolize key markets.

In his address, the President also focused on Kazakhstan’s commitment to sustainability and environmental protection. Tokayev highlighted plans to increase renewable energy capacity and develop hydrogen generation. The President proposed to hold a national referendum on the construction of a nuclear power plant.

The Kazakh leader also indicated a vision for Kazakhstan to become an IT-focused country. He directed the government to increase the export of IT services to one billion dollars by 2026. This will be facilitated by partnerships with major foreign IT companies.

In the realm of transportation, President Tokayev outlined plans to establish Kazakhstan as a major transit hub in Eurasia, focusing on key routes like the Trans-Caspian and the international North-South Corridor. He noted that Kazakhstan should eventually become a full-fledged transport and logistics power. The President also pointed out that the realization of the transport potential depends on Kazakhstan’s constructive and good-neighbourly relations with all neighbouring countries, including Russia, China, and our neighbours in Central and South Asia.

Kazakhstan is developing a national plan to provide projects with high-quality infrastructure by 2029 and is introducing new financial incentive mechanisms to facilitate investment flows into complex oil and gas projects.

=== Bond market ===
In October 2014, Kazakhstan introduced its first overseas dollar bonds in 14 years. Kazakhstan issued $2.5 billion of 10- and 30-year bonds on 5 October 2014, in what was the nation's first dollar-denominated overseas sale since 2000. Kazakhstan sold $1.5 billion of 10-year dollar bonds to yield 1.5 percentage points above midswaps and $1 billion of 30-year debt at two percentage points over midswaps. The country drew bids for $11 billion.

=== Foreign direct investment ===
Kazakhstan has concluded a number of Bilateral Investment Treaties (BITs), Treaties with Investment Provisions (TIPs) and Investment Related Instruments (IRIs) according to the database of UNCTAD.

Kazakhstan is the largest recipient of total and annual foreign direct investment of all CIS countries. The OECD has recognized the strides the government has made in opening the country to international investment and in improving the policy framework for investment as part of their efforts to diversify the economy. In 2017 Kazakhstan was invited by OECD to become Adherent to the OECD Declaration on International Investment and Multinational Enterprises.

As of 30 September 2014, total foreign investment in Kazakhstan reached US$211.5 billion. Of that total, net foreign Direct Investment constituted US$129.3 billion, with portfolio and other investments comprising the remaining US$82.2 billion.

The FDI growth in Kazakhstan was largely driven by increased investment in mining, transport, financial services, telecommunication, and energy that compensated for decreasing investment inflows in construction, metallurgy, and trade. The Prime Minister of Kazakhstan, Alikhan Smailov, has stated that Kazakhstan aims to attract foreign direct investment (FDIs) worth around US$25 billion in 2023, adding that 46 projects involving international financial investments were implemented in the country during 2022 in renewable energy, metallurgy, agriculture, mining industry, and engineering. Kazakhstan's top-10 FDI donors in 2022 included the Netherlands, the United States, Switzerland, Belgium, Russia, South Korea, China, France, the United Kingdom, and Turkey.

Kazakhstan established the Astana International Financial Center (AIFC), modelled on the Dubai International Financial Center, in 2018. The AIFC offers foreign investors an alternative jurisdiction for operations, with tax holidays, flexible labor rules, a Common Law-based legal system, and flexibility to carry out transactions in any currency. The Kazakh government recommends that foreign investors use the AIFC for contracts with Kazakh businesses.

Over the past five years, the major foreign investors in Kazakhstan have been the Netherlands ($33.8 billion of investment), the United States ($19.4 billion), Switzerland ($12.5 billion), China ($ 6.2 billion) and France ($ 4.7 billion). Notably, almost 60% of the investment projects are related to non-extractive sectors, including manufacturing, transportation, trade, as well as financial and insurance services. Agriculture is one of Kazakhstan's most important sectors where the country seeks to attract foreign investments to boost the competitiveness of this sector of economy. To that end, in 2017 KazAgro negotiated with the European Investment Bank (EIB) a €200 million loan for a period of 15 years.

13 Kazakhstan's regions out of 14 saw investment growth in 2020, despite the COVID-19 pandemic. High growth of investment was in the construction sector, specifically in Turkestan region and Zhambyl region as well as Shymkent city. The gross foreign direct investment (FDI) inflow in Kazakhstan reached $28 billion in 2022, a record-high in the past ten years. FDI inflow went up by 17.7 percent since 2021 when it reached $23.8 billion. In 2012, this figure stood at $28.9 billion. The Atyrau Region received most of the investment – $8.3 billion (a 48.3 percent increase), followed by Almaty city with $7.6 billion (10.9 percent), Astana – $2.2 billion (107.2 percent), the East Kazakhstan Region – $2.2 billion (3.1 percent), and the Aktobe Region – $1.2 billion (11.2 percent down).

One of the main areas for investment is renewable energy, as Kazakhstan has one of the largest solar and wind potentials in the region. Moreover, it has abundant reserves, amounting to 90% of Central Asia's total, of critical raw materials, which are essential for the deployment of technologies like wind turbines (with rare earth magnets), batteries (lithium and cobalt) and semiconductors (polysilicon). In November 2022, the EU had already recognised Kazakhstan's value for the green transition by signing a strategic partnership for the supply of critical raw materials, as well as green hydrogen.

=== Investor support ===
Kazakhstan's investment environment is defined by the government's support for foreign investors. To increase the FDI inflow, the country established the Kazakh Invest National Company, or Kazakh Invest for short. It is a one-stop shop for investors that facilitates investment projects' implementation process from an idea to implementation, as well as ensures aftercare services. In 2018, Kazakh Invest helped develop more than 70 investment proposals in a variety of industries: metallurgy, petrochemistry, food industry, tourism and other. It included creating a business plan, financial model and teaser development.

Currently, Kazakh Invest is involved in 216 investment projects and initiatives worth $42.5 billion that will create around 47,000 jobs. This year, 4 investment projects worth $217 million have been launched with the support of the organization, while 85 projects worth $12.3 billion are being implemented.

In order to facilitate foreign investment, Kazakhstan launched in 2020 an online portal elicense.kz, which allows to conclude investment contracts online reducing red tape. The first agreement that was concluded via the portal was between Kaz Solar 50 and the German company Solarnet Investment GmbH for a renewable energy project worth ₸5 billion.

To make Kazakhstan more attractive to foreign investors, Kazakhstan established 14 special economic zones. Companies located in these zones receive preferential treatment, including exemptions from corporate income tax, land tax, property tax, VAT and customs duties for up to 25 years,

=== Intellectual property ===
In 2015, Kazakhstan passed a law to regulate Intellectual Property, patent law, and copyright protections and bring its legislation into line with the European Patent Convention (1994 revision) and the 2006 Singapore Treaty.

=== United Arab Emirates ===
In April 2025, Al Khaleej Sugar, a leading sugar company from the United Arab Emirates, announced plans to establish a sugar plant in Kazakhstan’s Almaty Region. The decision was made following a meeting on 27 April between the company’s managing director, Sheikh Jamal Al Ghurair, and the region’s governor, Marat Sultangaziyev. The plant’s location was to be near the city of Konayev, chosen for its logistical advantages. Key considerations for the project included securing a reliable water supply, with alternative irrigation sources being explored, as well as the potential development of wind power plants to ensure the plant’s energy self-sufficiency. Al Khaleej Sugar aimed to minimize environmental impact by relying on renewable energy. The company, which controlled 3% of the global refined sugar market, conducted a detailed hydrological analysis to ensure the success of the project.

== Public policy ==
=== 2015 "Nurly Zhol" economic policy ===
On 11 November 2014 in his address to the nation for 2015, Nazarbayev proclaimed Kazakhstan's New Economic Policy – The Path to the Future (Nurly Zhol). The new economic policy implies large-scale state investment in infrastructure over the next several years. In the short term, the program "Nurly Zhol" will apply the anti-crisis measures to overcome the turbulence in the global economy. The long-term measures of the state program of infrastructure development will help to create a strong platform for new growth.

Kazakhstan has identified five priorities for modernization of the state and the economy to maintain competitiveness in the Fourth Industrial Revolution.

Kazakhstan was ranked 36th in the Ease of Doing Business report released by the World Bank Group in 2018. The report's rankings rate ease of regulations for businesses and strength of property rights.

The Heritage Foundation, a Washington, D.C.–based research center, ranked Kazakhstan 41st in its Index of Economic Freedom 2018. Its overall score has increased by 0.1 point, still being only "moderately free" with significant improvements in investment freedom and government integrity offsetting steep declines in fiscal health and monetary freedom.

Kazakhstan aimed in 2017 to boost its economy by attracting private investors interested in developing national companies. This is the main goal of privatization that is expected to decrease the share of public property to 15% of GDP. Such companies as Kazakhstan Railways, Samruk-Energo, Kazatomprom, Kaspost, KazMunayGas and Air Astana are expected to be sold through IPO.

Kazakhstan fell from 32nd to the 38th place in the 2018 IMD World Competitiveness ranking. The report evaluates business efficiency, public finance and domestic economy.

=== Privatisation 2016–2020 ===
In December 2015, Kazakhstan Government approved new privatization plan for 2016 – 2020. It is a large-scale privatization program that continues the privatization of 2014 and includes 60 major state-owned companies. According to Kazakh Finance ministry, the state budget got ₸6.99 billion (US$20.6 million) from the deals reached within the 2014–2016 privatization program as of 20 Sept. 2016. Kazakhstan's privatization program aims to reduce the state participation in the economy to 15 percent, which is the level set for countries of the OECD.

According to the Kazakh Prime Minister Alikhan Smailov, the implementation of a large-scale privatization plan will reduce the share of state participation in the economy down to 14 percent by 2025.

The privatization list includes 675 facilities in the public and quasi-public sectors, including the shares of 262 national companies that are part of holdings such as the Samruk Kazyna Sovereign Wealth Fund, KazMunayGas, and Kazakhstan Temir Zholy.

According to Minister of National Economy Alibek Kuantyrov, the plan excludes 200 critical social life support systems such as water, power, and heat facilities. These objects will remain under state ownership.

=== Special Economic Zones ===
A Special Economic Zone (SEZ) is a part of Kazakhstan's territory, which has a special legal regime, with all the necessary infrastructure, to carry out priority activities.

Kazakhstan has 14 SEZs with different industry orientations in 12 regions nationwide, particularly in the Khorgos-Eastern Gate logistics hub, Turkistan, a center of international tourism and pilgrimage, and the Aktau Seaport, which has incorporated the ports of Aktau and Kuryk in the summer of 2023.

In March 2023, Kazakhstan created the G4 City special economic zone in the Almaty Region, seeking to attract nearly 3.7 trillion tenge ($8.1 billion) of investments through 2048. The new economic zone with an area of 30,000 hectares is expected to provide favorable conditions for attracting domestic and foreign investment to create an integrated G4 City, which will facilitate the development of the entire region.

Currently, the following SEZs have been established in Kazakhstan:

1. 'Astana, the New City' in Nur-Sultan (the expiry date is in 2027).
2. 'Aktau Sea Port' in Aktau (the expiry date is on 1 January 2028).
3. 'Ontustik' in Sairam district of South-Kazakhstan region (the expiry date is on 1 July 2030).
4. 'National Industrial Petrochemical Park' in Atyrau region (the expiry date is on 31 December 2032)
5. 'Park of Innovative Technologies' (the expiry date is 1 January 2028).
6. ‘Saryarka’ in Karaganda region (the expiry date is 1 December 2036).
7. ‘Horgos - the eastern gates’ in Almaty region (the expiry date is 2035).
8. ‘Pavlodar’ in Pavlodar (the expiry date is 1 December 2036).
9. ’Chemical Park Taraz’ in Taraz (the expiry date is 1 January 2037).
10. ‘International Center for Cross-Border Cooperation Horgos' in Almaty region (the expiry date is 1 January 2041).
11. 'Turkestan' in Turkestan region (the expiry date is 1 January 2043).

=== Small and medium-sized enterprises ===
A new program to support small businesses was launched in Kazakhstan in February 2015. 2015 is expected to be a pilot period of the program. During that period the initiative will be focused on three major areas, notably agribusiness, machinery building and production of construction materials, and is to be further extended to other industries.

In May 2015 the European Bank for Reconstruction and Development (EBRD) agreed to provide €41 million for technical cooperation projects, advisory support to small and medium-sized enterprises (SMEs), and to introduce a Women in Business program.

In 2016, the number of Kazakhstan's telecom start-ups increased by 10% compared to 2015. Around 9,400 small telecom companies are currently registered in the country.

The Kazakh Government provides extensive support to businesses, especially SMEs. The share of small and medium-sized businesses (SMEs) in the country's gross domestic product grew by 7.9 percent between 2015 and 2021 and reached 34.7 percent. Kazakhstan plans to raise this indicator to 50% by 2050.

In 2023, it was reported that the number of small and medium-sized businesses (SMEs) in Kazakhstan has increased by 23.4% to nearly two million. The number of people working in SMEs increased by more than 18% to 4.1 million, accounting for around 40% of everyone employed in the economy.

The share of SMEs in the economy grew from 33.3% to 36.5%, while the volume of output by SMEs increased by 28% to over 59 trillion tenge ($132.4 billion).

To expand SMEs’ access to finance, a number of programmes are in place in the country to provide concessional lending and microfinance, subsidised interest rates, loan guarantees and grants to start a business. The main operator of financial support programmes for SMEs is the Damu Entrepreneurship Development Fund.

Government programme for business support and business development “Business Roadmap 2025”

The “BRM 2025” programme has been in operation since 2010 and is administered by the Ministry of National Economy of the Republic of Kazakhstan. Initially, the focus of the programme was on supporting enterprises in non-extracting and import-substituting sectors. Over time, this was expanded to rural areas, small and single-industry towns’ entrepreneurs, who are not subject to sectoral restrictions. The programme implementation involves both central and local authorities, Damu Entrepreneurship Development Fund, Atameken National Chamber of Entrepreneurs and commercial banks. The types of support that the programme offers include interest rate subsidies, loan guarantees, grants, training and consulting assistance; and meets the basic needs of entrepreneurs, making “BRM 2025” the most popular government programme.

The programmes of Damu Entrepreneurship Development Fund

The Damu Entrepreneurship Development Fund implements a number of its own programmes, which are financed from the company’s own capital or by raising funds from local authorities and international financial organisations. Within the framework of regional programmes, loans are granted at a rate of up to 8.0% in priority sectors, which are determined depending on the specifics of the economy of each region. Within the framework of international programmes, loans are issued on market terms and without sector restrictions.

In terms of its own programmes, Damu Fund and its partner organisations (banks, leasing companies, microfinance organisations) have financed more than 55 112 projects for KZT 837 756 million as of the end of 2020.

In May 2023, Prime Minister Alikhan Smailov said medium-sized businesses should become the engine of progress that drives Kazakhstan’s manufacturing growth with the launch of competitive products and a wide range of services. To enhance the protection of the rights of entrepreneurs, the government is introducing a regulation-from-scratch mechanism to drop 10,000 unwarranted requirements for businesses and automate processes in all areas of state control.

== Recent miscellany ==
Kazakhstan was ranked 54th 2017 Economic Freedom of the World report published by Fraser Institute, but ranks 12 places below on place 66 when adjusted by the Gender Disparity Index, which captures the degree to which women around the world have the same legal rights as men and adjusts the economic freedom score accordingly. This shows a large disadvantage of women in business.

In recent years a trade route has been established between Kazakhstan and the United States. It now makes up 54% of the World's salt imports and exports by volume (350,000 tonnes per year).

In 2021, 14 products developed by Kazakh scientists began being exported to China, Russia, Turkey, Georgia, Kyrgyzstan, and the Czech Republic. These products include, but are not limited to, food & drinks based on milk whey; probiotics; an anti-fungal drug; biological sanitation products.

In 2021, it was reported that the number of young female entrepreneurs in Kazakhstan has increased by 15 percent.

=== Global tariff war ===
On 11 April 2025, President Kassym-Jomart Tokayev stated that Kazakhstan was prepared to face the ongoing global economic crisis, which he described as one of the most severe in recent decades. He cited disruptions in global trade and production chains, price volatility, and intensified competition for investment as key challenges. Despite these pressures, Tokayev affirmed that Kazakhstan would maintain its development agenda and continue funding priority infrastructure projects. The statement followed a government meeting addressing falling global prices for energy and commodities. At the time, the economy had seen a temporary boost from rising export demand and the suspension of certain U.S. tariffs.

== See also ==
- List of companies of Kazakhstan
- List of Kazakhstanis by net worth
- List of regions of Kazakhstan by GDP
- Corruption in Kazakhstan
- Economy of Astana
- Federation of Trade Unions of Kazakhstan
- Kazakhstan and the International Monetary Fund
- Kazakhstan and the World Bank
- Kazakhstan National Fund
- KazKuat (2005), state-owned organization for domestic hydro-electric sector
- Ministry of Finance (Kazakhstan)
- Ministry of Industry and Construction
- Ministry of National Economy (Kazakhstan)
- Ministry of Trade and Integration (Kazakhstan)
- National Bank of Kazakhstan
- Nurly Tau Business Center
- Samruk-Kazyna
- Economy of Central Asia
