= Almaty Emergency Hospital =

Almaty Emergency Hospital Городская больница скорой неотложной помощи

Geography
- Location: Almaty, Kazakhstan
- Coordinates: 43.256227169014345°N 76.92871880232794°E

Services
- Beds: 355

History
- Former names: Almaty district and city hospital of Dzhetysusky regional public health department (1922-1924), Almaty city hospital of Dzhetysusky provincial public health department (1924-1927), city hospital of the Almaty public health department (1927-1947), city joint clinical hospital No. 1 of the Almaty public health department (1947-1975)
- Opened: 1896

Links
- Website: gbsnp.kz
- Lists: Hospitals in Kazakhstan

Almaty Emergency Hospital (also known as Ambulance Hospital of Amaty) was founded in 1896 in Almaty by the Red Cross Society. It then had 15 beds and was the only medical resource in the city. The first head doctor was the graduate of the St. Petersburg army medical college Ieronim Ivanovich Sobolevsky. It has changed its name several times.

The present building was opened on February 14, 2011. It has 355 hospital beds, and an intensive care unit for 12 patients. Dzhuvashev Almaz Bolatovich is the medical director.
