= International Investment Agreements of Kazakhstan =

Kazakhstan has concluded the following Bilateral Investment Treaties (BITs), Treaties with Investment Provisions (TIPs) and Investment Related Instruments (IRIs) according to the database of UNCTAD.

== Overview ==
International organizations such as the World Trade Organization periodically evaluate developments in trade and investment, trends and patterns in FDI and the investment regime for a particular country.

The U.S. government also periodically assesses investment conditions, openness to foreign investment, policies toward foreign direct investment, investment and tax treaties and trade facilitation measures.

== Bilateral Investment Treaties ==
No.	Short title	Status	Parties	Date of signature	Date of entry into force
1	Kazakhstan-Kyrgyzstan BIT (2024)	Signed (not in force)	Kyrgyzstan	24/04/2024	
2	Kazakhstan - Qatar BIT (2022)	Signed (not in force)	Qatar	12/10/2022	
3	Kazakhstan - Singapore BIT (2018)	Signed (not in force)	Singapore	21/11/2018	
4	Kazakhstan - United Arab Emirates BIT (2018)	Signed (not in force)	United Arab Emirates	24/03/2018	
5	Japan - Kazakhstan BIT (2014)	In force	Japan	23/10/2014	25/10/2015
6	Kazakhstan - Macedonia, The former Yugoslav Republic of BIT (2012)	In force	North Macedonia	02/07/2012	21/05/2016
7	Estonia - Kazakhstan BIT (2011)	In force	Estonia	20/04/2011	26/08/2014
8	Kazakhstan - Serbia BIT (2010)	In force	Serbia	07/10/2010	07/12/2015
9	Kazakhstan - Romania BIT (2010)	In force	Romania	02/03/2010	17/07/2013
10	Austria - Kazakhstan BIT (2010)	In force	Austria	12/01/2010	21/12/2012
11	Kazakhstan - Viet Nam BIT (2009)	In force	Viet Nam	15/09/2009	07/04/2014
12	Kazakhstan - Qatar BIT (2008)	Signed (not in force)	Qatar	04/03/2008	
13	Kazakhstan - Slovakia BIT (2007)	In force	Slovakia	21/11/2007	29/06/2016
14	Finland - Kazakhstan BIT (2007)	In force	Finland	09/01/2007	01/05/2018
15	Jordan - Kazakhstan BIT (2006)	In force	Jordan	29/11/2006	01/07/2008
16	Armenia - Kazakhstan BIT (2006)	In force	Armenia	06/11/2006	01/08/2010
17	Kazakhstan - Sweden BIT (2004)	In force	Sweden	25/10/2004	01/08/2006
18	Kazakhstan - Latvia BIT (2004)	In force	Latvia	08/10/2004	21/04/2006
19	Kazakhstan - Pakistan BIT (2003)	In force	Pakistan	08/12/2003	07/12/2009
20	Kazakhstan - Netherlands BIT (2002)	In force	Netherlands	27/11/2002	01/08/2007
21	Greece - Kazakhstan BIT (2002)	Signed (not in force)	Greece	26/06/2002	
22	Kazakhstan - Tajikistan BIT (1999)	In force	Tajikistan	16/12/1999	20/11/2001
23	Bulgaria - Kazakhstan BIT (1999)	In force	Bulgaria	15/09/1999	20/08/2001
24	Kazakhstan - Russian Federation BIT (1998)	In force	Russian Federation	06/07/1998	11/02/2000
25	BLEU (Belgium-Luxembourg Economic Union) - Kazakhstan BIT (1998)	In force	BLEU (Belgium-Luxembourg Economic Union)	16/04/1998	06/02/2001
26	France - Kazakhstan BIT (1998)	In force	France	03/02/1998	21/08/2000
27	Kazakhstan - Kuwait BIT (1997)	In force	Kuwait	31/08/1997	01/05/2000
28	Kazakhstan - Uzbekistan BIT (1997)	In force	Uzbekistan	02/06/1997	08/09/1997
29	Kazakhstan - Kyrgyzstan BIT (1997)	In force	Kyrgyzstan	08/04/1997	01/05/2005
30	India - Kazakhstan BIT (1996)	Terminated	India	09/12/1996	26/07/2001
31	Czech Republic - Kazakhstan BIT (1996)	In force	Czechia	08/10/1996	02/04/1998
32	Georgia - Kazakhstan BIT (1996)	In force	Georgia	17/09/1996	24/04/1998
33	Azerbaijan - Kazakhstan BIT (1996)	In force	Azerbaijan	16/09/1996	30/04/1998
34	Kazakhstan - Malaysia BIT (1996)	In force	Malaysia	27/05/1996	03/08/1997
35	Kazakhstan - Romania BIT (1996)	Terminated	Romania	25/04/1996	05/04/1997
36	Kazakhstan - Korea, Republic of BIT (1996)	In force	Korea, Republic of	20/03/1996	26/12/1996
37	Iran, Islamic Republic of - Kazakhstan BIT (1996)	In force	Iran, Islamic Republic of	16/01/1996	03/04/1999
38	Israel - Kazakhstan BIT (1995)	In force	Israel	27/12/1995	19/02/1997
39	Kazakhstan - United Kingdom BIT (1995)	In force	United Kingdom	23/11/1995	23/11/1995
40	Hungary - Kazakhstan BIT (1994)	In force	Hungary	07/12/1994	03/03/1996
41	Kazakhstan - Mongolia BIT (1994)	In force	Mongolia	02/12/1994	13/05/1995
42	Italy - Kazakhstan BIT (1994)	Terminated	Italy	22/09/1994	12/07/1996
43	Kazakhstan - Poland BIT (1994)	In force	Poland	21/09/1994	25/05/1995
44	Kazakhstan - Ukraine BIT (1994)	In force	Ukraine	17/09/1994	04/08/1995
45	Kazakhstan - Lithuania BIT (1994)	In force	Lithuania	15/09/1994	25/05/1995
46	Kazakhstan - Switzerland BIT (1994)	In force	Switzerland	12/05/1994	13/05/1998
47	Kazakhstan - Spain BIT (1994)	In force	Spain	23/03/1994	22/06/1995
48	Egypt - Kazakhstan BIT (1993)	In force	Egypt	14/02/1993	08/08/1996
49	Finland - Kazakhstan BIT (1992)	Terminated	Finland	29/09/1992	14/02/1998
50	Germany - Kazakhstan BIT (1992)	In force	Germany	22/09/1992	10/05/1995
51	China - Kazakhstan BIT (1992)	In force	China	10/08/1992	13/08/1994
52	Kazakhstan - United States of America BIT (1992)	In force	United States of America	19/05/1992	12/01/1994
53	Kazakhstan - Turkey BIT (1992)	In force	Türkiye	01/05/1992	10/08/1995

== Treaties with Investment Provisions ==
No.	Short title	Status	Parties	Date of signature	Date of entry into force
1	CIS Agreement on Services and Investment (2023)	In force		08/06/2023	05/06/2024
2	Kazakhstan - Singapore Services and Investment Agreement (2023)	In force	Singapore	22/05/2023	01/03/2025
3	EU - Kazakhstan EPCA (2015)	In force	EU (European Union)	21/12/2015	01/03/2020
4	Eurasian Economic Union - Viet Nam FTA (2015)	In force	Viet Nam	29/05/2015	05/10/2016
5	Treaty on the Eurasian Economic Union (2014)	In force		29/05/2014	01/01/2015
6	Belarus - Kazakhstan - Russia Agreement on Services and Investment (2010)	In force	Belarus, Russian Federation	09/12/2010	01/01/2012
7	Eurasian Investment Agreement (2008)	In force	Belarus, Kyrgyzstan, Russian Federation, Tajikistan	12/12/2008	11/01/2016
8	ECO Investment Agreement (2005)	Signed (not in force)		07/07/2005	
9	US - Central Asia TIFA (2004)	In force	Kyrgyzstan, Tajikistan, Turkmenistan, United States of America, Uzbekistan	01/06/2004	01/06/2004
10	Common Economic Zone Agreement (2003)	In force	Belarus, Russian Federation, Ukraine	19/09/2003	20/05/2004
11	CIS Investor Rights Convention (1997)	In force	Armenia, Belarus, Kyrgyzstan, Moldova, Republic of, Tajikistan	28/03/1997	21/01/1999
12	EC - Kazakhstan Cooperation Agreement (1995)	Terminated	EU (European Union)	23/01/1995	01/07/1999
13	The Energy Charter Treaty (1994)	In force		17/12/1994	16/04/1998
14	IFD Agreement	In negotiation			

== Investment Related Instruments ==
No.	Short title	Date of adoption	Level	Type
1	Islamic Corporation for the Insurance of Investment Credit	1992	Regional/Plurilateral	Intergovernmental agreements
2	MIGA Convention	1985	Multilateral	Intergovernmental agreements
3	New York Convention	1958	Multilateral	Intergovernmental agreements
4	ICSID Convention	1965	Multilateral	Intergovernmental agreements
5	Draft Supplementary Treaty to the Energy Charter Treaty	1998	Regional/Plurilateral	Draft instruments
6	UN Code of Conduct on Transnational Corporations	1983	Multilateral	Draft instruments
7	World Bank Investment Guidelines	1992	Multilateral	Guidelines, principles, resolutions and similar
8	ILO Tripartite Declaration on Multinational Enterprises	2000	Multilateral	Guidelines, principles, resolutions and similar
9	ILO Tripartite Declaration on Multinational Enterprises	2006	Multilateral	Guidelines, principles, resolutions and similar
10	ILO Tripartite Declaration on Multinational Enterprises	1977	Multilateral	Guidelines, principles, resolutions and similar
11	UN Guiding Principles on Business and Human Rights	2011	Multilateral	Guidelines, principles, resolutions and similar
12	Permanent Sovereignty UN Resolution	1962	Multilateral	Guidelines, principles, resolutions and similar
13	New International Economic Order UN Resolution	1974	Multilateral	Guidelines, principles, resolutions and similar
14	Charter of Economic Rights and Duties of States	1974	Multilateral	Guidelines, principles, resolutions and similar

== See also ==
- Foreign relations of Kazakhstan
- Economy of Kazakhstan
