= Kazakhstan and the World Bank =

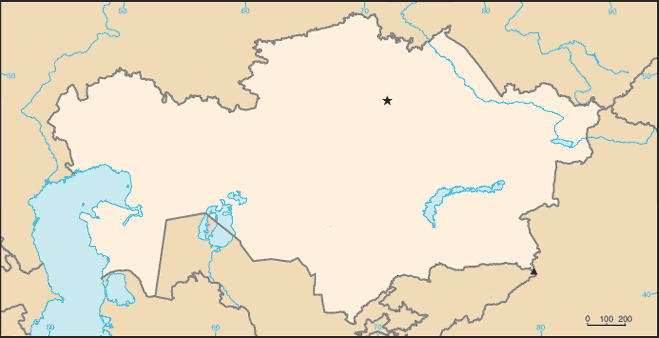
Kazakhstan's location on the world map.

Kazakhstan joined the World Bank in 1992 after it had gained independence from the Soviet Union in 1991. Kazakhstan has one of the fastest growing economies in the world, and as a result had its classification changed from a lower-middle income state to an upper-middle income state in 2006. Because of this, Kazakhstan has begun to rely less on international financing than in than previous decades; however, Kazakhstan still takes out loans from the World Bank, primarily relating to the country's environmental issues.

== History ==
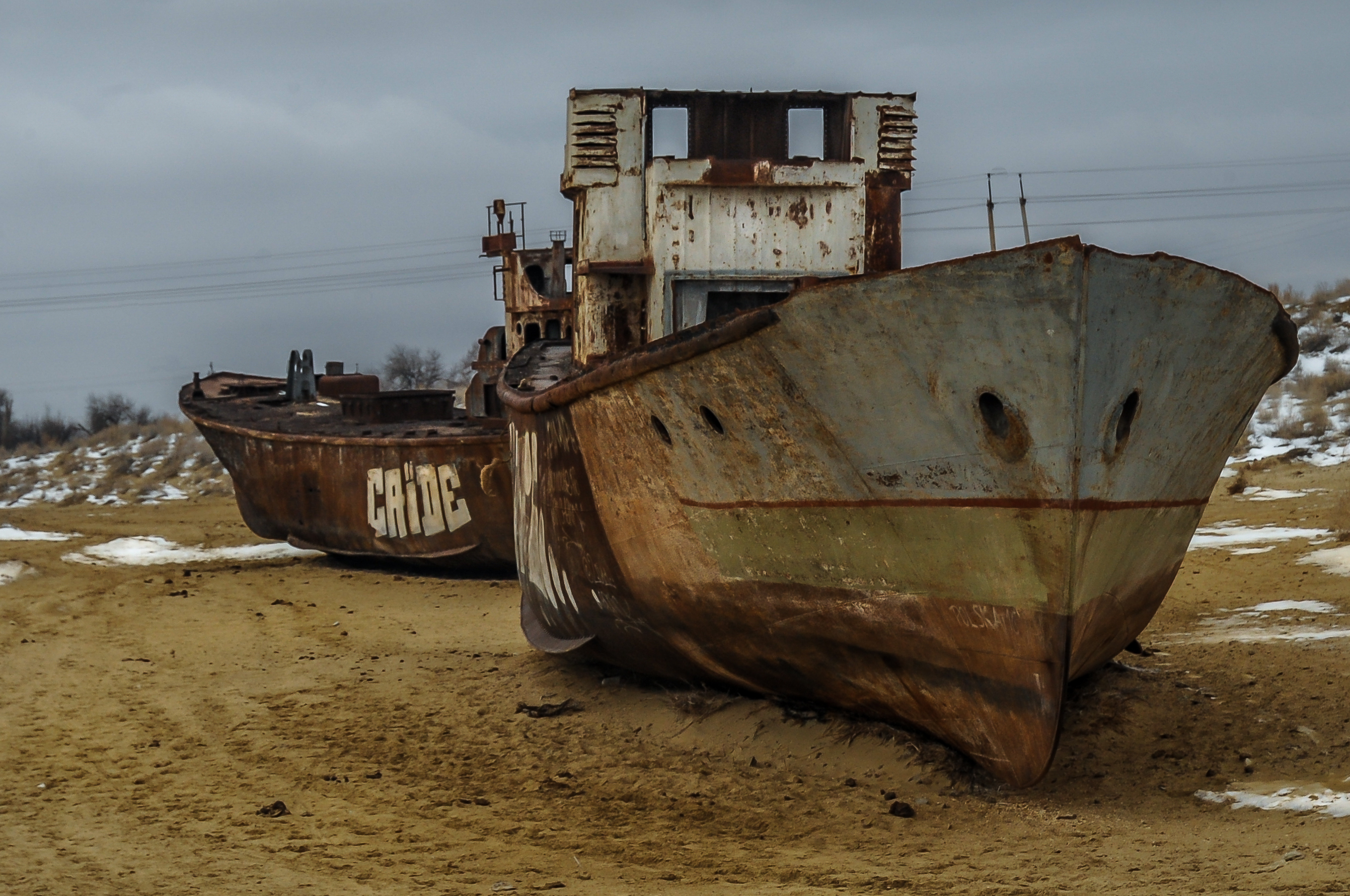
Loss of water in the Aral Sea has left boats stranded in a newly formed desert.

Upon leaving the Soviet Union, Kazakhstan showed impressive growth due to its government's willingness to accept market liberalization and widespread banking reforms. Spearheaded by its booming oil industry, Kazakhstan was able to produce 60% of the GDP of Central Asia while it experienced an average of 10% growth rates from 1996 through 2006. The rapid growth in the economy meant that the World Bank's efforts in Kazakhstan have been primarily focused on the country's dire environmental issues. Specifically, early World Bank efforts targeted replenishing the Aral Sea which had been reduced to nearly 10% of its original size since Soviet irrigation projects had begun in the area in the 1960s. It is in the view of the World Bank that efforts to bring water back to the North Aral Sea have largely been successful thanks to the construction of the Kok-Aral Dam which raised the water levels by 4m. Along with projects to restore the Aral Sea, the World Bank also invested in infrastructure projects. World Bank investments in infrastructure in Kazakhstan were primarily loans given to supplement ongoing projects such as the construction of an electricity grid and thousands of Kilometers of planned roads.

== Current World Bank Loan Efforts ==
=== IBRD ===
Logo of the World Bank

Currently the branch of the World Bank which provides the most funds to Kazakhstan is the IBRD. The IBRD has had 48 projects in Kazakhstan and has committed more than 8 billion USD to infrastructure, developmental, and environmental projects. The most recent major project that has been funded by the IBRD was a 1 billion dollar loan given for programmatic development policy financing. The goal of this major project, contradictory to the World Banks primary goal of environmental reform in Kazakhstan, is to help Kazakhstan reorient its economy so that it is less reliant on the Oil Industry. The loan, which was approved in 2015, is currently being repaid by Kazakhstan.

=== IFC ===
The International Finance Corporation has also had major involvement in Kazakhstan's development efforts. It has directly invested in 26 projects worth over 1 billion dollars, and has been an adviser on 5 projects totaling nearly 10 million dollars. Most recent investment from the IFC have been to financial institutions with the goal of providing support for small enterprise in remote parts of Kazakhstan. Some recent projects have also targeted Agribusiness, in order to increase the countries food production and decrease its reliance on foreign imports.

=== MIGA ===
MIGA has also given two loans to Kazakhstan, although MIGA does not participate much in the growth of Kazakhstan as its focus is primarily on lower-income developing countries. MIGA's only involvement in Kazakhstan was two loans of $190 million given to the ATF Bank in Kazakhstan to alleviate stresses from the 2008 financial crisis. Both of these loans aimed to allow the ATF Bank to diversify its portfolio to include more small and medium enterprises.

== Reception ==
Overall trends for the economy in Kazakhstan indicate that World Bank efforts to help the development of Kazakhstan have been a net positive for the country. This is reflected in the rising life expectancy and decreasing poverty ratio of the country. However, evidence suggests that the World Bank has failed to effectively tackle one of its main goals in Kazakhstan, protecting the environment. Although efforts to revitalize the Aral Sea have largely been successful, Carbon dioxide emission in the country have rapidly increased since the year 2000.

== Recent developments ==
On 20 March 2025, Deputy Prime Minister Serik Zhumangarin emphasized the partnership’s role in structural reforms and sustainable growth, with GDP expected to rise by 5.6% in 2025. Key initiatives include the Kambarata HPP-1, road modernization, innovation, and Aral Sea restoration. World Bank Regional Director Tatiana Proskuryakova highlighted the $2.5 billion project portfolio and the importance of ratifying the Partnership Framework Agreement to expand cooperation.
