= Magnum Cash & Carry =

Kazakh supermarket chain

- Type: Limited liability partnership
- Industry: Retail
- Founded: 14 September 2007; 18 years ago in Almaty, Kazakhstan
- Founder: Alexander Garber
- Headquarters: 90А Ratushnogo Street, Almaty, 050000
- Number of locations: 186 (2023)
- Area served: Kazakhstan
- Key people: Azamat Osmanov (general director)
- Products: Consumer goods, groceries, household items
- Revenue: KZT 350 billion (2021)
- Number of employees: 13,509 (2021)
- Website: www.magnum.kz

Magnum Cash & Carry LLP is a Kazakh retail and wholesale supermarket chain headquartered in Almaty, founded in 2007. It is the largest retail chain in Kazakhstan and one of the country's largest private companies. The company operates hypermarkets, supermarkets, and convenience stores under several formats, including Magnum Cash & Carry, Magnum Hyper, Magnum Super, Magnum Express, and Magnum Daily.

As of 2023, the company operated more than 180 stores across multiple cities in Kazakhstan, including Astana, Karaganda, Shymkent, and Oskemen, as well as one location in Tashkent. The chain serves more than 350,000 customers daily and employs over 13,000 people.

Magnum Cash & Carry's primary business activity is the retail sale of consumer goods. The company reported turnover of approximately KZT 350 billion in 2021.

== History ==
Magnum Cash & Carry was founded on 14 September 2007 with the opening of its first store in Almaty, initially owned by businessman Alexander Garber. The company expanded rapidly during the late 2000s and early 2010s, opening additional hypermarkets and supermarkets in major cities including Astana, Karaganda, Taldykorgan, and Shymkent.

By 2016 the company had expanded from a single store to 19 retail complexes in five cities, reflecting rapid growth in Kazakhstan's modern supermarket sector.

In April 2016, Magnum placed dollar-indexed bonds on the Kazakhstan Stock Exchange, raising 33 billion tenge to support further expansion.

Beginning in the late 2010s, the company shifted part of its strategy toward smaller neighborhood formats such as Magnum Express and Magnum Daily, alongside continued development of hypermarkets and shopping-centre supermarkets. In 2019, Magnum acquired the Realist retail chain and its store locations as part of this expansion into compact-format stores.

In December 2021, the company opened its first hypermarket in Tashkent, marking its entry into the Uzbek market and its first major international expansion. In August 2023, Magnum acquired the Uzbek operations of the Carrefour franchise previously operated by Majid Al Futtaim Uzbekistan. However, by 2024–2025 the company began scaling back its presence in Uzbekistan amid market challenges.

== Activities ==
Magnum Cash & Carry operates a nationwide network of hypermarkets, supermarkets, and convenience stores under several retail formats, including Magnum Hyper, Magnum Super, Magnum Express, and Magnum Daily. The company works directly with domestic and international suppliers and offers a range of private-label and branded consumer goods. As September 2018, approximately half of the products sold in Magnum stores were produced in Kazakhstan.

== Social initiatives ==
Magnum Cash & Carry participates in charitable and social support programs in Kazakhstan, including assistance for children from low-income families and cooperation with government social assistance initiatives. According to Vlast, the company was ranked 14th among the largest corporate philanthropists in Kazakhstan in 2018. The company has reported annual charitable contributions exceeding 100 million tenge.
