= Kazakhstan and the International Monetary Fund =

The Republic of Kazakhstan is a successor state of the former Soviet Union. According to the IMF, Kazakhstan maintains a good balance of payments ratio and looks relatively stable economically. Under Article IV of the IMF's Articles of Agreement, the IMF has the obligation to "exercise surveillance" over its policy members. This means that they look after the economic, financial, and exchange rate policies of its members, including Kazakhstan and meet approximately once a year with Kazakh government and national bank officials.

== History ==
After the dissolution of the Soviet Union in 1991, the Republic of Kazakhstan officially became a member of the IMF on July 15, 1992. The first project in Kazakhstan was made with the goal to restructure the banking system, first by licensing and tightening regulations, and second by making the necessary regulatory and institutional structural reforms. The IMF states that from the start of this project in 1996 to the end of 1997, the major goals were accomplished and a major financial collapse was avoided.

As a result of the 2014 drop in oil prices, Kazakhstan was affected significantly, especially with the oil and gas trade. Central Asia and Caucasus region suffered an economic decline of 5.5%. Kazakhstan's inability and delay to open new oil and gas fields exacerbated the problem. Another effect of the collapse of oil prices is that the currency, the tenge, has seen a drop in value of 50% of the dollar as of January 2016. While the national bank was printing more money and causing inflation to occur at 7.4% and 13.6% in 2014 and 2015, respectively, the national bank has since lowered inflation to 6.8% in 2016. This was within the target range for the National Bank of Kazakhstan (NBK).

== Current Issues ==
=== Buffer Zone ===
As a result of the oil price drop, Kazakhstan had to adjust. Announced by President Nursultan Nazarbayev in November 2014, Nurly Zhol (Bright Path) was a program meant to stimulate the economy by investing in infrastructure, energy projects, tourism, etc. The project will total around $9 billion (USD). Under the 2015 Consultation the IMF had with Kazakh officials, the IMF believed that the stimulus package was justified and had enough buffers to keep it from being affected by other economic factors, including the fall in oil prices. The IMF also suggested, however, there needs to be reforms to increase the revenue base by medium-term fiscal accommodation, such as reforming the tax code to gain more revenue. They also propose that the NBK focuses their monetary policy on controlling inflation. The IMF reports that if the NBK can manage and lower the expected inflation would allow the NBK to ease and ensure price stability.

=== Response to the price drop ===
11% of all exports go to Russia, making it the second-biggest trading partner in terms of exports after China (14%). However, 33% of all of Kazakh imports come from Russia. When Russia was affected by the 2014 fall of oil prices, oil became cheaper to import from Russia and as a result, the Kazakh economy suffered. Kazakhstan responded with the depreciation of the tenge by looking into the non-oil economic sector. For example, aiding car manufacturers because or farmers for having sustained losses due to the imports of cheaper Russian goods. Kazakhstan is also vulnerable to social unrest, particularly in regions like Mangyshlak and Atyrau which depend on oil. Clashes between oil workers in western Kazakhstan and riot police in 2011 left several dead, and the Kazakh government continues to worry about this issue.

The IMF has made a positive economic forecast to the Kazakh economy, expecting its GDP to grow 3.4%, which is lower than previous years, but is climbing again along with the non-oil economy which is expected to rise 4%. While the 2017 consultation ended with the praise of Kazakh officials for being able to respond quickly and gauge effectively the impacts of the situation, the IMF also believes that structural changes do need to be made in order to keep Kazakhstan from becoming too vulnerable from swinging commodity prices and loss in oil revenue.
