= List of Kazakhstanis by net worth =

This is a list of Kazakhstani billionaires based on an annual assessment of wealth and assets compiled and published by Forbes magazine in 2026.

== 2026 Kazakhstani billionaires list ==
World Rank	Rank	Name	Citizenship	Residence	Net worth (USD)	Source of wealth
477	1	Vyacheslav Kim	Kazakhstan	Almaty	7.8 billion	fintech
712	2	Vladimir Kim	Kazakhstan	Almaty	5.9 billion	mining
780	3	Timur Kulibaev	Kazakhstan	Almaty	5.4 billion	banking
780	4	Dinara Kulibaeva	Kazakhstan	Almaty	5.4 billion	banking
780	5	Bulat Utemuratov	Kazakhstan	Astana	5.4 billion	mining, banking, hotels
823	6	Timur Turlov	Kazakhstan	Almaty	5.2 billion	stock brokerage
2858	7	Smagulov Nurlan	Kazakhstan	Almaty	1.3 billion	automotive
3185	8	Aidyn Rakhimbayev	Kazakhstan	Astana	1.1 billion	real estate and construction

== See also ==
- The World's Billionaires
- List of countries by the number of billionaires
