= Healthcare in Kazakhstan =

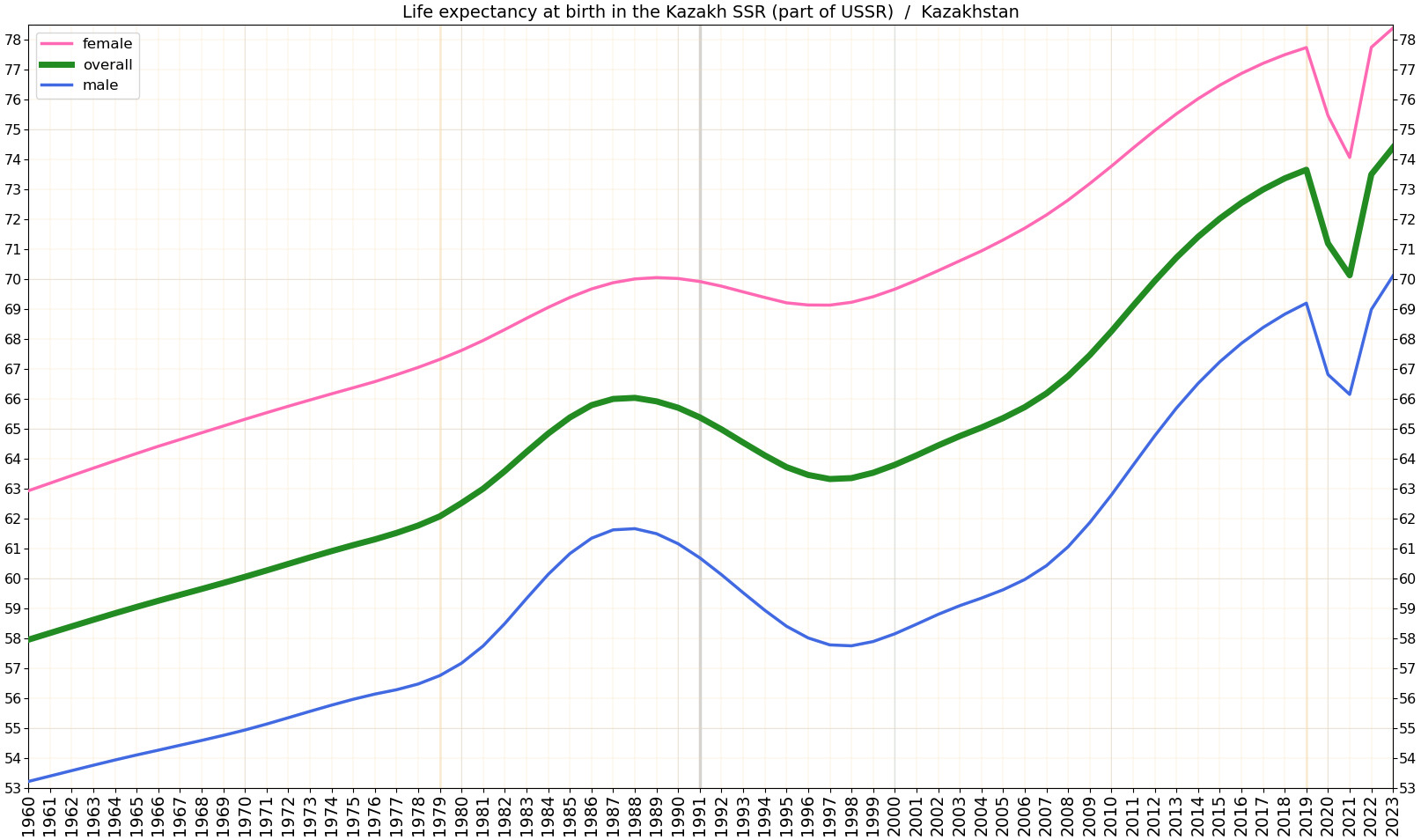
Life expectancy at birth in Kazakhstan

The Healthcare in Kazakhstan is a post-Soviet healthcare system under reform. The World Health Organization (WHO), in 2000, ranked the Kazakhstan's healthcare system as the 64th in overall performance, and 135th by overall level of health (among 191 member nations included in the study).

The country’s recent health reforms aim to progress towards universal health coverage through a strong primary health care and promoting family medicine, particularly in rural and remote areas. Regional and local governments have led these changes, with increased autonomy for primary health facility managers.

There has been two big reform programs since 2000. The National Programme for Healthcare Reform and Development (2005-2010) and the Health Care Development Programme (2011-2015).

The Human Rights Measurement Initiative finds that Kazakhstan is fulfilling 79.7% of what it should be fulfilling for the right to health based on its level of income. When looking at the right to health with respect to children, Kazakhstan achieves 96.1% of what is expected based on its current income. Regarding the right to health among the adult population, the country achieves only 80.9% of what is expected based on the nation's level of income. Kazakhstan falls into the "very bad" category when evaluating the right to reproductive health because the nation is fulfilling only 62.1% of what the nation is expected to achieve based on the resources (income) it has available.

== Burden of Disease ==
The most common diseases are cardiovascular conditions, respiratory infections, and neoplasms. Being cardiovascular diseases the leading cause of death. Since 2000, the incidence of human immunodeficiency virus (HIV) has increased, as has the incidence of environment-linked cancers. In 2024 an estimated 43,000 citizens had HIV. In 2024 there was 70 people with tuberculosis for every 100,000 people in Kazakhstan. There has also been very high numbers of suicides in Kazakhstan, which has been worsening since 2018, with an estimate of 18 people per 100,000 population. Mortality due to air pollution is improving since 2010, with 82 deaths per 100,000 people in 2019.

10 mothers died per 100,000 live births, and 8 children per 1,000 live births in 2023. Which indicates a constant reduction in deaths since 1971, with the exception on a spike in maternal mortality in 2021, attributed to COVID-19. Life expectancy was of 74.4 years old in 2023.

High blood pressure, poor nutrition and smoking are major causes of deaths and ill-health. Kazakhstan has initiated policies targeting these factors, including initiatives to reduce salt consumption and tobacco use and a ban on vaping products.

== Healthcare System ==
Healthcare in Kazakhstan is provided by a network of primary, secondary and tertiary care facilities. Healthcare facilities are largely owned and operated by the public sector represented by the Ministry of Health. As an ex-Soviet country, Kazakhstan comes from a hospital centered health care system.

Kazakhstan transitioned to a social health insurance system in 2020. Residents have access to two packages: a government-guaranteed package for all and a social health insurance package with a wider package of benefits for those who pay contributions or for whom the government pays on their behalf. Both packages are administered by the Social Insurance System but with distinct funding pools. On behalf of employed individuals, employers contribute 3% of the monthly wage (not exceeding 10 minimum wages annually). In contrast, self-employed or self-paying individuals pay a flat fee of 5950 tenge (equivalent to approximately €12 in 2024) per month. The state covers contributions for specific groups such as children, unemployed people, pregnant women, those on parental leave, caregivers and pensioners. At the beginning of 2024, over 84% of the population had SHIF coverage. Non-covered groups of the population include undocumented migrants and those working in the informal sector.

The state-guaranteed benefits package includes emergency medical services, primary health care services and specialized outpatient and inpatient services for acute cases, as well as prevention and treatment of HIV, tuberculosis (TB) and other “socially significant diseases”. Outpatient prescription medicines and vaccinations for these diseases are covered by public funds.

The social insurance health package available includes diagnostic and outpatient specialized care through GP referral, chronic disease management programmes, some dental care, rehabilitation services, planned and emergency inpatient care for diseases outside the category of “socially significant diseases” (such as tuberculosis, HIV/AIDS, hepatitis, cancer, diabetes or poor mental health), and a broader range of outpatient prescription medicines. In both benefits packages, out-of-pocket payments are required for specialist services provided without a referral and some of the prescribed medications.

Per capita spending on health increased in recent years to US$ 1114 in 2021. The share of public spending in overall health spending has also increased to 65.3% in 2021 and is now much higher than in the Central Asian countries overall (39.6%). Out-of-pocket (OOP) spending has subsequently declined, from 33.9% of health spending in 2019 to 25.0% in 2021.

Primary Health Care services are provided by general practitioners or a combination of district internists (for adults) and paediatricians (for children), working in primary health care units (polyclinics), which may be standalone or located within rayon (rural) hospitals (owned privately or by the oblast or city health department). Specialized care is available in large polyclinics, ambulatory care centres, rural hospitals, city hospitals, and regional, specialized and national hospitals.

The latest health reforms include mobile care units to improve service delivery in rural areas. Telemedicine services were expanded for remote consultations during COVID-19-related isolation measures.

There are no linkages between primary and secondary healthcare and many services are organized in parallel vertical structures

== Ministry of Health ==
The Ministry of Health of Kazakhstan is one of executive branches in Kazakh government to control, regulate and organize the delivery of social services in public health and medical care. One of the office head was Salidat Kayirbekova. The Oblast Health Departments play an important role in managing all publicly owned health facilities within their territories.

The Ministry of Healthcare owns national level health facilities (mainly tertiary care hospitals). The oblast or city health departments of the country’s regional authorities (17 oblasts and 3 cities – Almaty, Astana and Shymkent) own all publicly run health facilities in their respective territories, regardless of city or rural location.

== Facilities ==
There is a nationwide system of government-owned medical facilities open to the general public. A big share of medical health care is delivered through a vast network of primary care facilities called ambulatories and policlinics.

Secondary and tertiary care is provided in more than 522 public (482 hospitals under the Ministry of Healthcare and 40 hospitals under other ministries) and 316 private hospitals across the country, including national centres, research institutes, university clinics, regional (oblast) hospitals, city hospitals and district (rural) hospitals. There is still an imbalance between specialist services and primary health care centers.

== Hospitals ==
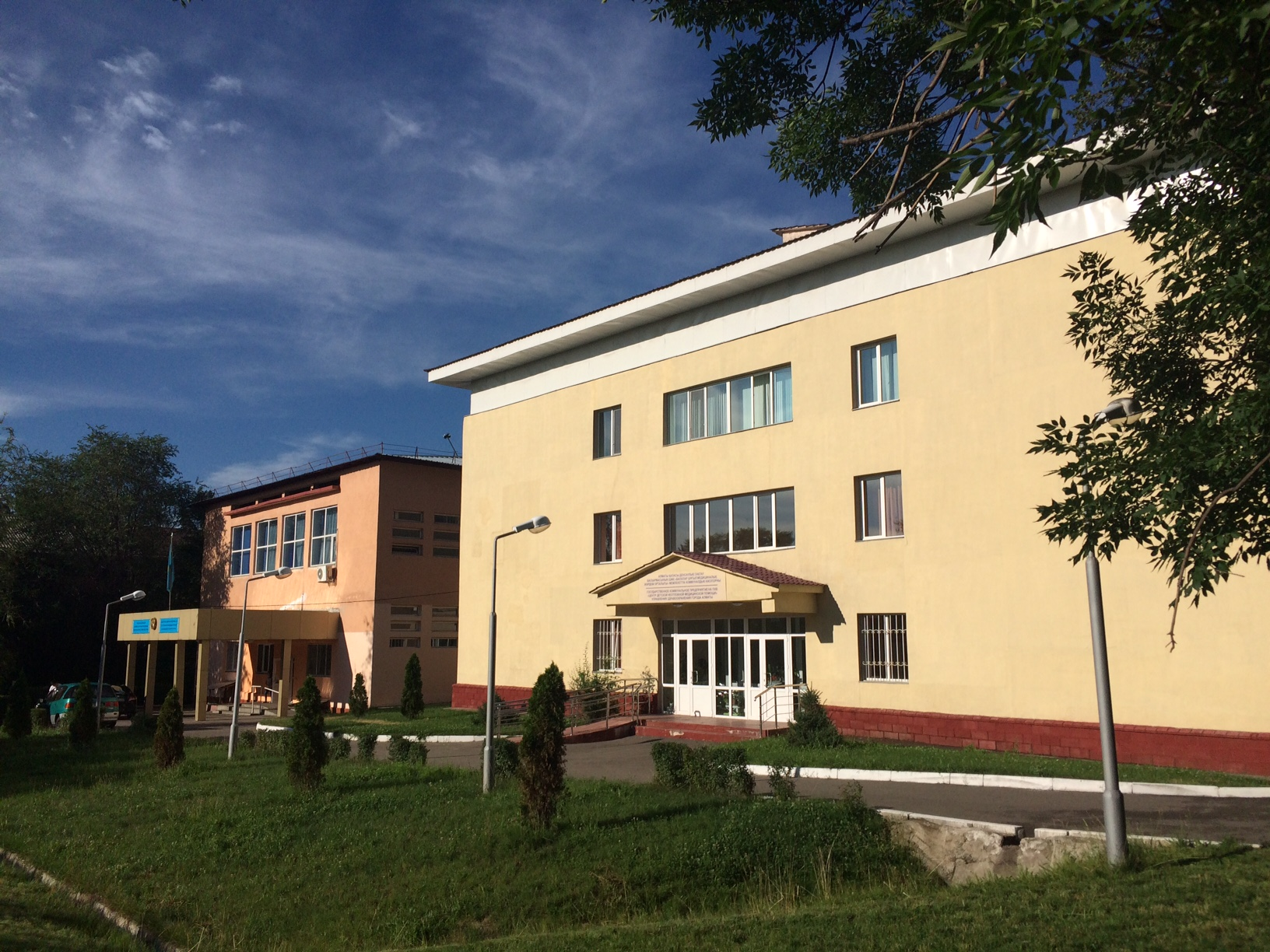
Children's Hospital in Almaty

Kazakhstan has an extensive hospital network, with most hospitals being focused on a single specialty. As many other Soviet countries, their hospitals are oversized and the country is transitioning into a more primary care health focus. The public hospitals share of total hospital capacity has remained relatively stable (about 70%) for decades. There are also privately owned for-profit hospitals as well as government hospitals in some locations, mainly owned by county and city governments.

Hospitals provide some outpatient care in their emergency rooms and specialty clinics, but primarily exist to provide inpatient care. Hospital emergency departments and urgent care centers are sources of sporadic problem-focused care. Hospice services for the terminally ill who are expected to live six months or less are most commonly subsidized by charities and government. Prenatal, family planning care is government-funded obstetric and gynaecological specialty and provided in primary care facilities, and are usually staffed by nurse practitioners (midwives).

The number of hospital beds per 100 000 population decreased in Kazakhstan between 2006 (752) and 2019 (513). However, between 2019 and 2020 there was a large increase due to the response to the COVID-19 pandemic, reaching 672 hospital beds per 100 000 population in 2020, which was almost on par with the ratio of hospital beds in 2000. In addition to existing hospitals, some modular hospitals were built and some public buildings were temporarily turned into hospitals.

The national Department of Defense of Kazakhstan operates field hospitals as well as permanent hospitals (the Military Health System), to provide military-funded care to active military personnel.

Hospitals in Kazakhstan include the following:

- Almaty Emergency Hospital
- Children's Hospital in Almaty

== Medical Pofessionals ==
Kazakhstan has 407 professionally active staff per 100 000 population, but rural areas face shortages on staff, with 82.8% of physicians working in urban areas. . The number of nurses increased from 566 per 100 000 population in 2000 to 747 in 2012, but it was still at 741 per 100 000 population in 2022. . After years of reform, currently nurses’ education is offered at bachelor’s level and the country also offers master and PhD degrees in nursing.

Over the years numerous initiatives have been introduced to attract health professionals to work in rural and remote areas. These include start-off funds for transportation, housing and land. Young doctors are also required to work in their assigned health facility for three years after graduation, if their studies were fully covered by the government (which applies to about 70% of students). Despite these initiatives, retention of young health professionals in rural areas is low. The absence of infrastructure for their families – such as job opportunities, childcare facilities and extracurricular activities has shown to be a significant obstacle for working in rural and remote areas.

== National Medical Holding ==
National Medical Holding is an experimental health system located in capital city Nur-Sultan. Its purpose is to be "medical cluster", so new health technologies could be acquired, developed and disseminated across the nation. It comprises several hospitals under centralized management, and as of 2012 is subordinated to Nazarbayev University.

- National Research Center for Maternal and Child Health
- Republican Diagnostic Center
- National Research Cardiac Surgery Center
- Republican Research Center for Neurosurgery
- Republican Research Center for Emergency Care
- National Children's Rehabilitation Center

== Non-governmental organizations ==
Multiple domestic and international health NGOs conduct their work in Kazakhstan. The World Health Organization has a country office in Nur-Sultan and works with the Ministry of Healthcare and healthcare providers on initiatives for treatment, prevention and education.

== Health Train ==
Salamatty Kazakhstan is a State Healthcare Development Programme. In Kazakhstan three trains equipped with modern diagnostic and treatment equipment, such as ultrasound and fluorography, counselling facilities, a small operating room, a laboratory and communication facilities follow scheduled routes every year. The trains provide remote populations with free examination and treatment by qualified medical specialists, such as therapists, dentists, ophthalmologists, otolaryngologists (ENTs), surgeons, urologists, mammologists and paediatricians. Between 2010 and 2019, their teams of health care professionals examined 488 880 inhabitants in remote areas of Kazakhstan, including 101 614 children.
