= List of bilateral free trade agreements =

A bilateral free trade agreement is between two sides, where each side could be a country (or other customs territory), a trade bloc or an informal group of countries, and creates a free trade area.

Note that every customs union, common market, economic union, customs and monetary union and economic and monetary union is also a free trade area, and there are several fully multilateral free trade agreements not included below.

== Operating agreements ==
List of agreements between two states, two blocs or a bloc and a state.

=== Afghanistan ===
Afghanistan has bilateral agreements with the following countries:

- India
- Pakistan

=== Armenia ===
Armenia has bilateral agreements with the following countries and blocs:

- Commonwealth of Independent States
  - Belarus
  - Kazakhstan
  - Kyrgyzstan
  - Moldova
  - Russia
  - Turkmenistan
  - Tajikistan
  - Uzbekistan
- Eurasian Economic Union
  - Eurasian Customs Union members
    - Vietnam free trade agreement
    - China trade and economic agreement
    - Iran free trade agreement
    - Serbia free trade agreement
    - Singapore free trade agreement
- European Union Armenia qualifies to export its products under the EU's Generalized System of Preferences (GSP)
- Georgia
- Ukraine
- United States Armenia qualifies to export its products under the U.S. Generalized System of Preferences (GSP) program

=== ASEAN ===
ASEAN Free-trade areas

ASEAN has bilateral agreements with the following countries:

- ASEAN–China Free Trade Area (ACFTA), in effect as of 1 January 2010
- ASEAN–Hong Kong, China Free Trade Area (AHKFTA)
- ASEAN–India Free Trade Area (AIFTA), in effect as of 1 January 2010
- ASEAN–Japan Comprehensive Economic Partnership (AJCEP), in effect as of 1 December 2008
- ASEAN–Korea Free Trade Area (AKFTA), in effect as of 1 January 2010
- ASEAN–Australia–New Zealand Free Trade Area (AANZFTA), in effect as of 1 January 2010

=== Australia ===
Australia Free trade agreements in force

Australia has bilateral agreements with the following countries and blocs:

- ASEAN
- Canada
- Chile
- China
- Hong Kong
- India
- Indonesia (Separate from ASEAN Free Trade Agreement)
- Japan
- Malaysia (Separate from ASEAN Free Trade Agreement)
- Mexico
- New Zealand
- Papua New Guinea
- Peru
- Singapore (Separate from ASEAN Free Trade Agreement)
- South Korea
- Thailand
- United Kingdom
- United States

=== Azerbaijan ===
Azerbaijan has bilateral agreements with the following countries:

- Georgia
- Kazakhstan
- Moldova
- Pakistan
- Russia
- Turkey
- Turkmenistan
- Ukraine
- Uzbekistan
- United States: Azerbaijan is a beneficiary country of the U.S. Generalized System of Preferences (GSP) program.

=== Bhutan ===
Bhutan has bilateral agreements with the following countries:

- India
- Thailand

=== Brunei ===
Brunei has bilateral agreements with the following countries:

- Japan
- Singapore (Separate from ASEAN Free Trade Area)

=== CARICOM ===
Caribbean Community (CARICOM) has bilateral agreements with the following countries and blocs:

- Costa Rica
- Dominican Republic
- Chile
- Australia
- Bolivia
- Canada
- Central America (Costa Rica, El Salvador, Honduras. Guatemala and Nicaragua)
- Colombia
- Cuba
- Ecuador
- EFTA (Iceland, Liechtenstein, Norway and Switzerland)
- European Union Member States
- MERCOSUR (Argentina, Brazil, Paraguay, Uruguay and Venezuela)
- Panama
- Peru
- Turkey
- United Kingdom
- United States

=== Canada ===
Canada Countries and territories with free trade agreements

Canada has bilateral trade agreements with the following countries and blocs:

- Australia
- Chile
- Colombia
- Costa Rica
- Honduras
- Indonesia
- Israel
- Japan
- Jordan
- Malaysia
- Mexico
- New Zealand
- Panama
- Peru
- South Korea
- United Kingdom
- United States
- Vietnam
- The European Free Trade Association
- The European Union

=== Cambodia ===
Cambodia has bilateral trade agreements with the following countries:

- China (2023) (Separate from ASEAN Free Trade Agreement)

=== China ===
Mainland China Free-trade areas

China has bilateral trade agreements with the following blocs, countries, and its two special administrative regions:

- Hong Kong (Mainland and Hong Kong Closer Economic Partnership Arrangement) (CEPA) (2003)
- Macau (Mainland and Macau Closer Economic Partnership Arrangement) (CEPA) (2003)
- Chile (China-Chile Free Trade Agreement) (2006)
- Pakistan (China-Pakistan Free Trade Agreement) (2006)
- New Zealand (China-New Zealand Free Trade Agreement) (2008)
- Singapore (China-Singapore Free Trade Agreement) (2009)
- ASEAN (China–ASEAN Free Trade Area) (2010)
- Republic of China (Taiwan), Economic Cooperation Framework Agreement (ECFA) (2010)
- Peru (China-Peru Free Trade Agreement) (2010)
- Costa Rica (China-Costa Rica Free Trade Agreement) (2011)
- Iceland (China-Iceland Free Trade Agreement) (2014)
- Switzerland (China–Switzerland free trade agreement) (2014)
- Australia (China–Australia Free Trade Agreement) (2015)
- South Korea (China–South Korea Free Trade Agreement) (2015)
- Georgia (China–Georgia Free Trade Agreement) (2017)
- Cambodia (China-Cambodia Free Trade Agreement) (2023)

=== Colombia ===
Colombia has bilateral agreements with the following countries and blocs (date it took effect):

- Canada (15 August 2011)
- CARICOM (1 May 1995)
- Chile (8 May 2009)
- Costa Rica (1 August 2016)
- EFTA:
  - Iceland (1 October 2014)
  - Liechtenstein-Switzerland (1 July 2011)
  - Norway (1 September 2014)
- European Union (5 November 2014)
- Israel (11 August 2020)
- South Korea (30 June 2016)
- Mexico (1 January 1995)
- Northern Triangle:
  - Guatemala (12 November 2009)
  - El Salvador (1 February 2010)
  - Honduras (27 March 2010)
- Pacific Alliance (1 May 2016)
- United States, United States–Colombia Free Trade Agreement (15 May 2012)

=== Costa Rica ===
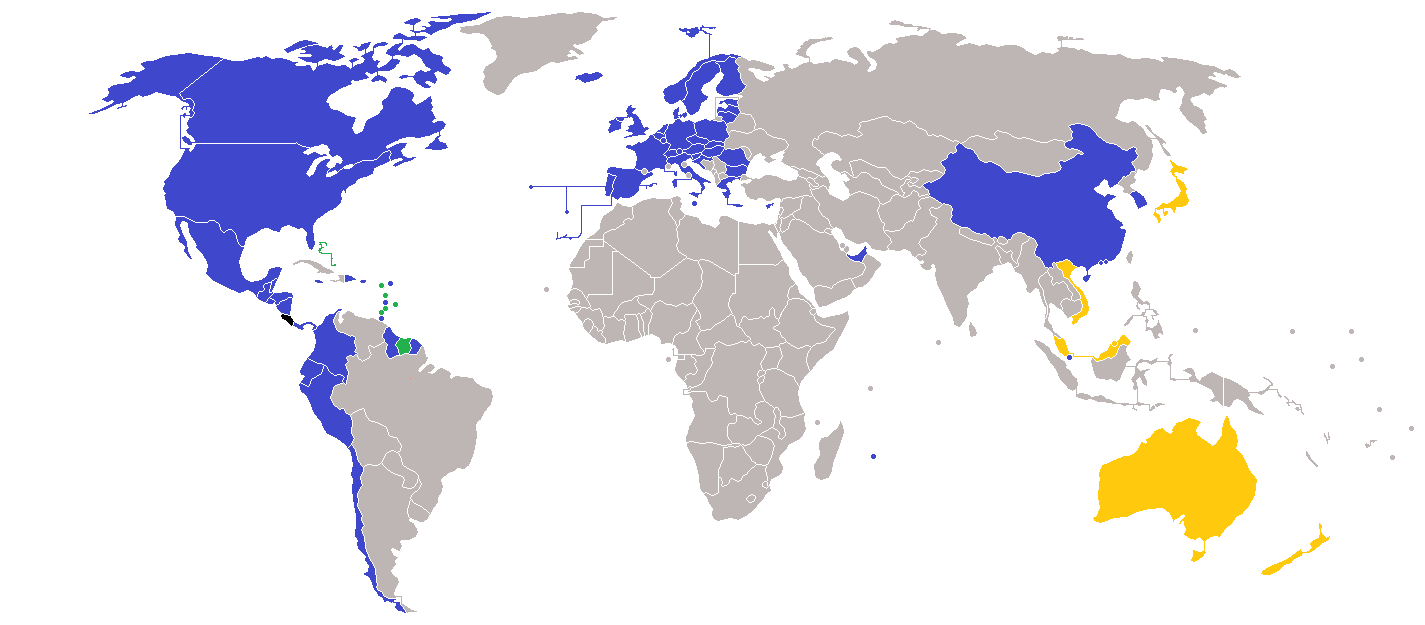
FTA Costa Rica has approved (blue) / is negotiating (yellow)

Costa Rica has bilateral agreements with the following countries and blocs (date it took effect):

- Canada (1 November 2002)
- Chile (15 February 2002)
- China (1 August 2011)
- Colombia (1 August 2016)
- Dominican Republic (7 March 2002)
- Ecuador (1 October 2024)
- EFTA Member States (5 May 2014)
- El Salvador Customs union, (1963, re-launched on 29 October 1993)
- European Union Member States (October 1, 2013)
- Guatemala Customs union, (1963, re-launched on 29 October 1993)
- Honduras Customs union, (1963, re-launched on 29 October 1993)
- Mexico (January 1, 1995)
- Nicaragua Customs union, (1963, re-launched on 29 October 1993)
- Panama (31 July 1973, renegotiated and expanded for (1 January 2009)
- Peru (1 June 2013)
- Singapore (16 May 2013)
- South Korea (6 March 2019)
- United Arab Emirates (1 April 2025)
- United Kingdom (6 March 2019)
- United States (1 January 2009 as part of CAFTA)
- Caribbean Community (CARICOM) (15 November 2005)
  - Trinidad and Tobago (15 November 2005)
  - Guyana (30 April 2006)
  - Barbados (1 August 2006)
  - Belize (10 March 2011)
  - Jamaica (1 June 2015)
  - Antigua and Barbuda
  - Dominica
  - Grenada
  - Saint Kitts and Nevis
  - Saint Lucia
  - Saint Vincent and the Grenadines

=== Eurasian Economic Union ===
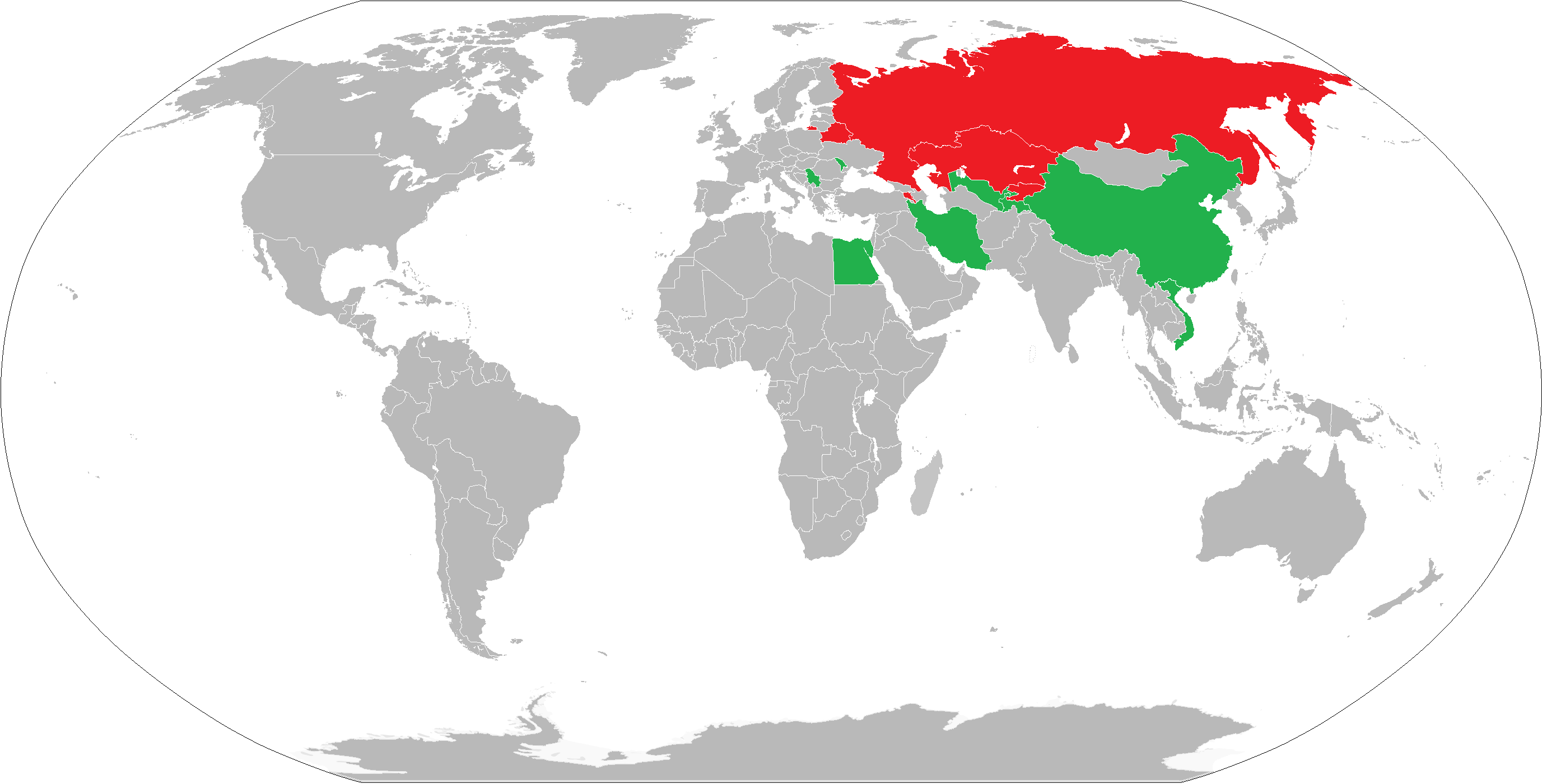
Free trade agreements of EEU. Red – EEU. Green – Countries that have FTA with EEU.

The Eurasian Economic Union consisting of Russia, Belarus, Kazakhstan, Armenia and Kyrgyzstan has following free trade agreements, see further here.

- China (2019)
- Egypt (2015)
- Indonesia (2025)
- Iran (2021)
- Moldova (2013)
- Serbia (2019)
- Singapore (2019)
- Tajikistan (2016)
- Uzbekistan (2014)
- Vietnam (2016)

=== European Free Trade Association ===
EFTA Free-trade areas

EFTA has bilateral agreements with the following countries – including dependent territories – and blocs:

- Albania
- Canada
- Chile
- Colombia
- Costa Rica
- Georgia
- Gulf Cooperation Council (GCC)
- Faroe Islands (autonomous entity of Denmark)
- Egypt
- Hong Kong
- India
- Indonesia
- Israel
- Jordan
- Lebanon
- North Macedonia
- Mexico
- Morocco
- Philippines
- Palestinian Authority
- Serbia
- Singapore
- South Korea
- Southern African Customs Union
- Thailand
- Tunisia
- Turkey
- Ukraine

=== European Union ===
EU Free trade agreements European Union Agreement in force Agreement (in part) provisionally applied

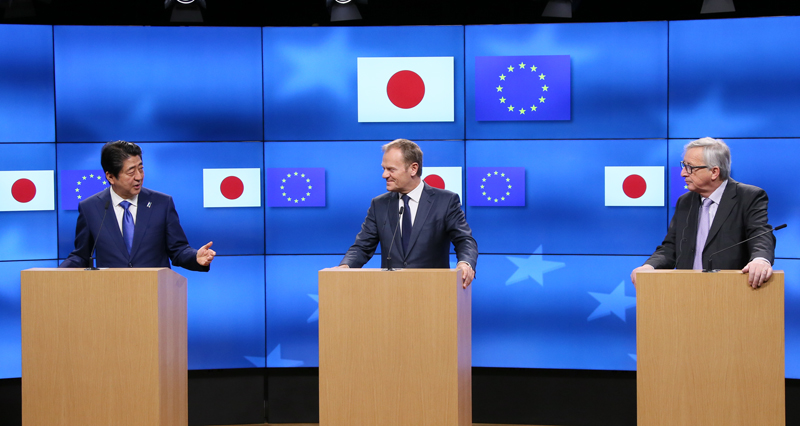
Shinzō Abe, Donald Tusk and Jean-Claude Juncker in 2017

The European Union has bilateral agreements with the following countries and blocs:

- Albania SAA (2009)
- Algeria AA (2005)
- Andorra CU (1991)
- Bosnia and Herzegovina SAA (2015)
- Canada: Comprehensive Economic and Trade Agreement (provisionally applied)
- Central America AA
- Chile AA (2003)
- Egypt AA (2004)
- Faroe Islands, autonomous entity of Denmark (1997)
- Georgia AA/DCFTA (2014)
- India FTA (2027)
- Indonesia CEPA (2027)
- Israel AA (2000)
- Japan EU-Japan Economic Partnership Agreement (2019)
- Jordan AA (2002)
- Lebanon AA (2006)
- Macedonia SAA (2004)
- Mexico AA (2000)
- Montenegro SAA (2010)
- Monaco CU (1958, Franco-Monegasque Treaties)
- Morocco AA (2000)
- Palestinian Authority interim AA (1997)
- San Marino CU (2002)
- Serbia SAA (signed 2008, entry into force on 1 September 2013)
- South Africa AA (2000)
- South Korea: European Union–South Korea Free Trade Agreement (entered in to force on 13 December 2015)
- Switzerland FTA (1973)
- Tunisia AA (1998)
- Turkey CU (1996)
- EU Overseas Countries and Territories
- Vietnam: European Union-Vietnam Free Trade Agreement (2020)
- United Kingdom: European Union-United Kingdom Trade and Cooperation Agreement (entry into force 1 May 2021)

=== Faroe Islands ===
The Faroe Islands have bilateral agreements with the following countries and blocs:

- EFTA Member States (The Hoyvík Agreement)
- European Union Member States
- Turkey (October 1, 2017)

=== Georgia ===
Georgia Countries with whom Georgia signed Free Trade Agreement (FTA). Countries with whom Georgia has General Schemes of Preference (GSP).

Georgia has bilateral free trade agreements with the following countries and blocs:

- Armenia
- Azerbaijan
- China
- EFTA (Iceland, Lichtenstein, Norway, Switzerland)
- EU
- Russia
- Turkey
- Turkmenistan
- Ukraine
- United Arab Emirates
- Uzbekistan
- United States: Georgia is a beneficiary country of the U.S. Generalized System of Preferences (GSP) program.

=== Gulf Cooperation Council ===
The Gulf Cooperation Council (GCC) has bilateral agreements with the following countries and blocs:

- Lebanon (Entry into force: November 2005)
- Singapore (Entry into force: 1 September 2013)
- EFTA (Entry into force: 1 July 2014)
- South Korea (Agreement date: 28 December 2023)

=== Hong Kong ===
Hong Kong has bilateral free trade agreements with the following countries and blocs:

- ASEAN
- Australia
- Chile
- China
- EFTA (Iceland, Lichtenstein, Norway, Switzerland)
- Macau
- New Zealand
- Singapore (Separate from ASEAN Free Trade Agreement)

=== India ===
India Free-trade areas Agreement under negotiation

India has bilateral trade agreement with the following countries and blocs:

- Afghanistan
- ASEAN
- Asia–Pacific
- Australia
- Bhutan
- European Free Trade Association
- European Union
- Japan
- Malaysia
- Mauritius
- Nepal
- New Zealand
- Oman
- SAARC
- Singapore
- South Korea
- Sri Lanka
- United Arab Emirates
- United Kingdom

=== Indonesia ===
Indonesia has bilateral agreements with the following countries and blocs:

- Australia (Indonesia–Australia Comprehensive Economic Partnership Agreement)
- Canada (Indonesia–Canada Comprehensive Economic Partnership Agreement)
- Chile (Indonesia–Chile Comprehensive Economic Partnership Agreement)
- EAEU (Indonesia–EAEU Free Trade Agreement)
- EFTA (Indonesia–EFTA Comprehensive Economic Partnership Agreement)
- EU (Indonesia–EU Comprehensive Economic Partnership Agreement)
- Iran (Indonesia–Iran Preferential Trade Agreement)
- Japan (Indonesia–Japan Economic Partnership Agreement)
- Mozambique (Indonesia–Mozambique Preferential Trade Agreement)
- Pakistan (Indonesia–Pakistan Preferential Trade Agreement)
- Palestine (Indonesia–Palestine Trade Facilitation for Certain Products)
- Peru (Indonesia–Peru Comprehensive Economic Partnership Agreement)
- South Korea (Indonesia–Korea Comprehensive Economic Partnership Agreement)
- United Arab Emirates (Indonesia–UAE Comprehensive Economic Partnership Agreement)

=== Israel ===
Free trade agreements of Israel Israel Agreement in force Agreement signed and waiting for approval Agreement in negotiations Potential agreement QIZ Agreement only Custom union with the Palestinian Authority (Area A and B)

Israel has bilateral agreements with the following countries and blocs:

- Canada – Canada–Israel Free Trade Agreement
- Colombia
- European Free Trade Association
- European Union
- Guatemala
- Jordan
- Mexico
- Mercosur
- Panama
- South Korea
- Turkey
- Ukraine
- United Arab Emirates
- United Kingdom
- United States – Israel–United States Free Trade Agreement
- Vietnam

=== Japan ===
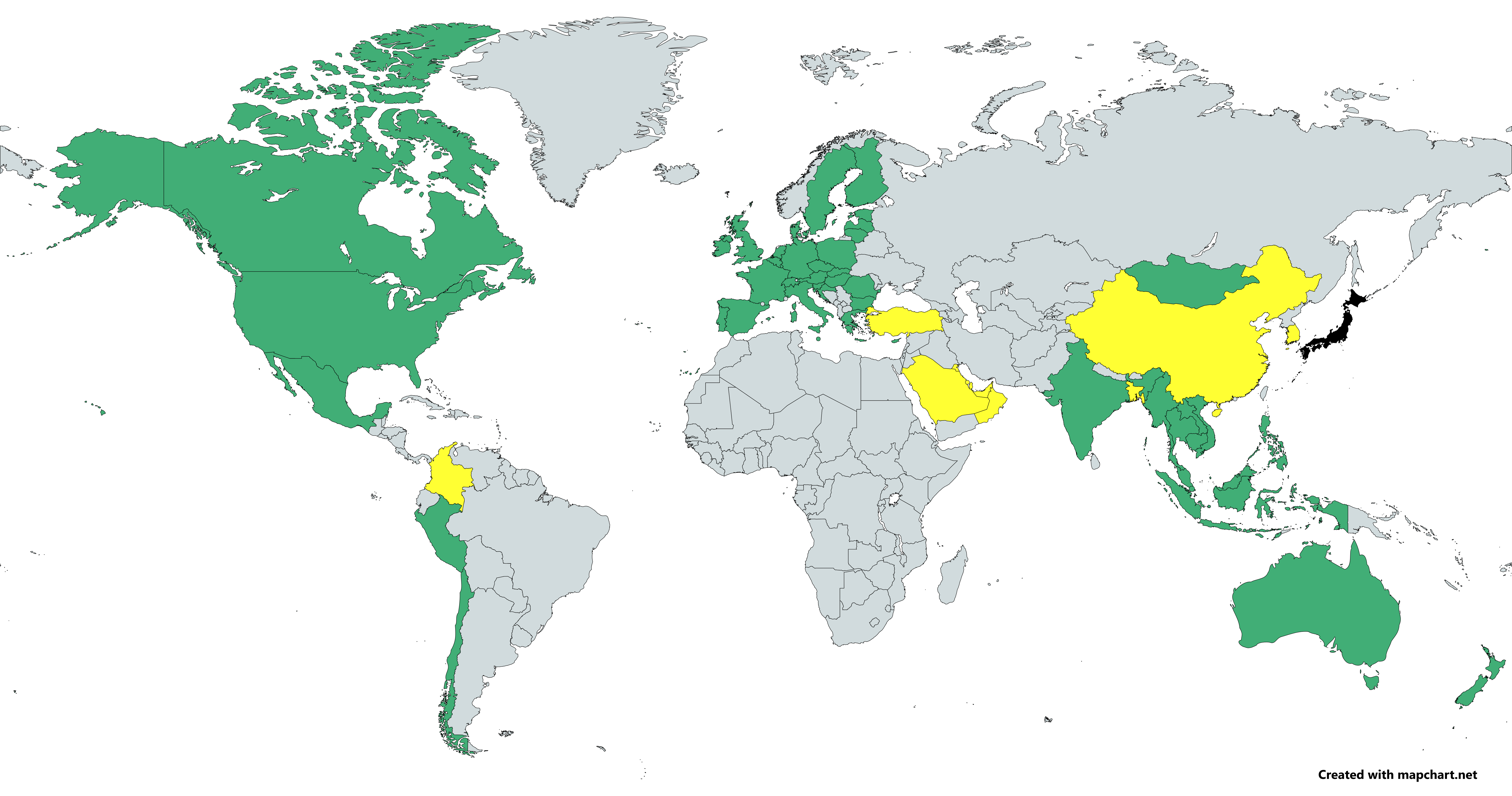
Japan Agreement in force Agreement under negotiation

Japan has bilateral agreements with the following countries and blocs:

- ASEAN (Entry into force 2009)
- Australia (Entry into force 2015)
- Brunei (Entry into force 2009)
- European Union (EU–Japan Economic Partnership Agreement) (Entry into force in 2019)
- India (Entry into force in 2011)
- Indonesia (Japan–Indonesia Economic Partnership Agreement) (Entry into force in 2008)
- Malaysia (Entry into force in 2006)
- Mexico (Entry into force in 2005)
- Mongolia (Entry into force in 2016)
- Peru (Entry into force in 2012)
- Philippines (Entry into force in 2008)
- Singapore (Entry into force in 2003)
- Switzerland (Entry into force in 2009)
- Thailand (Japan–Thailand Economic Partnership Agreement) (Entry into force in 2007)
- Vietnam (Entry into force in 2009)
- United Kingdom (signed in 2020)
- United States (Entry into force in 2020)

=== Jordan ===
Jordan has bilateral agreements with the following countries and blocs:

- Bahrain
- Canada
- Iraq
- Israel
- Kuwait
- Morocco
- Saudi Arabia
- Singapore
- Sudan
- Syria
- Tunisia
- United Arab Emirates
- United Kingdom
- United States (United States–Jordan Free Trade Agreement)
- The Palestinian Territories
- The European Free Trade Association
- The European Union

=== Kazakhstan ===
Kazakhstan has bilateral agreements with the following countries:

- Armenia
- Russia
- Ukraine
- Uzbekistan
- United States: Kazakhstan is a beneficiary country of the U.S. Generalized System of Preferences (GSP) program.

=== Kyrgyzstan ===
The Kyrgyzstan has bilateral agreements with the following countries:

- Kazakhstan (Entry into force: 11 November 1995)
- Moldova (Entry into force: 21 November 1996)
- Russian Federation (Entry into force: 24 April 1993)
- Ukraine (Entry into force: 19 January 1998)
- Uzbekistan (Entry into force: 20 March 1998)
- United States: Kyrgyzstan is a beneficiary country of the U.S. Generalized System of Preferences (GSP) program.

=== Lebanon ===
Lebanon has bilateral agreements with the following international blocs:

- Gulf Cooperation Council (GCC) (2004)
- European Free Trade Association (EFTA) (2008)
- European Union (EU) (2008)
- Southern Common Market (Mercosur / Mercosul) (2016)

=== Malaysia ===
Malaysia has bilateral agreements with the following countries:

- Australia (Separate from ASEAN Free Trade Agreement)
- India (Separate from ASEAN Free Trade Agreement)
- Japan (Separate from ASEAN Free Trade Agreement)
- New Zealand (Separate from ASEAN Free Trade Agreement)
- Pakistan
- Singapore (Separate from ASEAN Free Trade Area)
- Turkey

=== Marshall Islands ===
Marshall Islands has signed bilateral agreements with the following countries:

- Micronesia (1986)
- Palau (1994)
- United States (1986)
- Taiwan (2023, Not yet in effect)

In addition, Marshall Islands and Taiwan have signed the agreement in 2019, approved it in 2023 and will take effect at a future date:

=== Mercosur ===
Mercosur has signed bilateral agreements with the following countries:

- Israel
- Egypt
- Lebanon
- The Palestinian Territories

=== Mexico ===
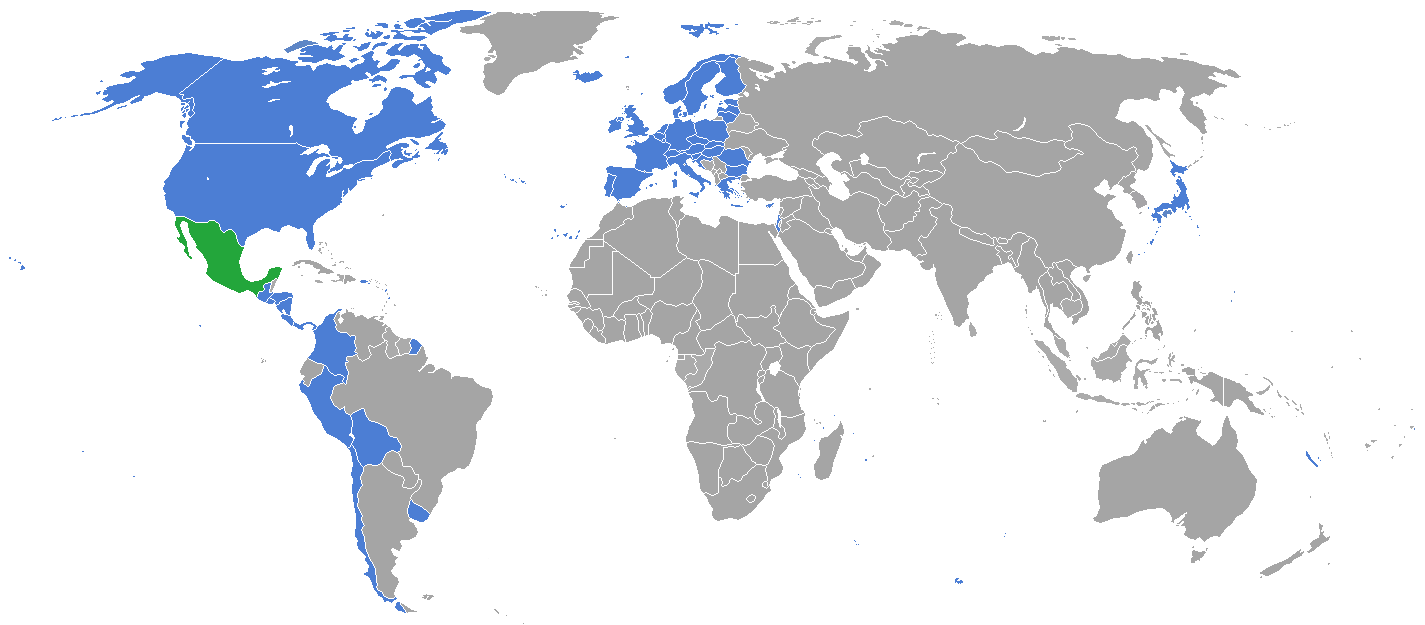
Mexico free trade agreements

Mexico has bilateral agreements with the following countries and blocs:

- Free trade agreements
  - USMCA
  - CPTPP
  - Chile (Chile–Mexico Free Trade Agreement)
  - Colombia (Colombia–Mexico Free Trade Agreement)
  - Costa Rica (Costa Rica–Mexico Free Trade Agreement)
  - EFTA (EFTA-Mexico Free Trade Agreement) (Iceland, Liechtenstein, Norway, Switzerland)
  - European Union (EU-Mexico Economic Partnership)
  - Israel (Israel–Mexico Free Trade Agreement)
  - Japan (Japan–Mexico Economic Association Agreement)
  - Nicaragua (Nicaragua–Mexico Free Trade Agreement)
  - Northern Triangle (El Salvador, Honduras and Guatemala)
  - Panama
  - Uruguay (Uruguay-Mexico Free Trade Agreement)
- Framework agreements
  - MERCOSUR–Mexico Economic Association (Argentina, Brazil, Paraguay, Uruguay, Venezuela)
- Preferential trade agreements
  - Argentina
  - Brazil
  - Ecuador
  - Paraguay
  - Panama
  - Peru

=== Micronesia ===
Micronesia has bilateral agreements with the following countries:

- Marshall Islands (1986)
- Palau (1994)
- United States (1986)

=== Morocco ===
Morocco has bilateral agreements with the following countries and blocs:

- European Free Trade Association
- European Union
- Jordan
- Tunisia
- Turkey
- United Arab Emirates
- United States

=== New Zealand ===
New Zealand Free trade agreements in force FTA concluded but not in force

New Zealand has bilateral agreements with following countries and blocs:

- ASEAN
- Australia
- Brunei
- Canada
- Chile
- China
- EU
- Hong Kong
- Japan
- Malaysia
- Mexico
- Peru
- Singapore
- South Korea
- Taiwan
- Thailand
- United Arab Emirates
- United Kingdom

=== Pakistan ===
Pakistan has bilateral free trade agreements with:

- Afghanistan
- Azerbaijan
- China
- Indonesia
- Malaysia
- Turkey
- Sri Lanka

=== Panama ===
Panama has bilateral agreements with the following countries:

- Chile
- Costa Rica
- El Salvador
- Guatemala
- Honduras
- Israel
- Mexico
- Nicaragua
- Peru
- Republic of China (Taiwan)
- Singapore
- South Korea
- United States

=== Peru ===
Peru has bilateral agreements with the following countries and blocs:

- Canada
- Costa Rica
- EFTA
- People's Republic of China
- Indonesia
- Japan
- Mexico
- Panama
- Singapore
- Thailand
- United States
- EU

=== Serbia ===
Serbia has bilateral agreements with the following countries and blocs:

- EU (SAA)
- EFTA
- CEFTA
- China
- Egypt
- Russia
- Belarus
- Turkey
- Kazakhstan
- United Arab Emirates
- United States (GSP)

=== Singapore ===
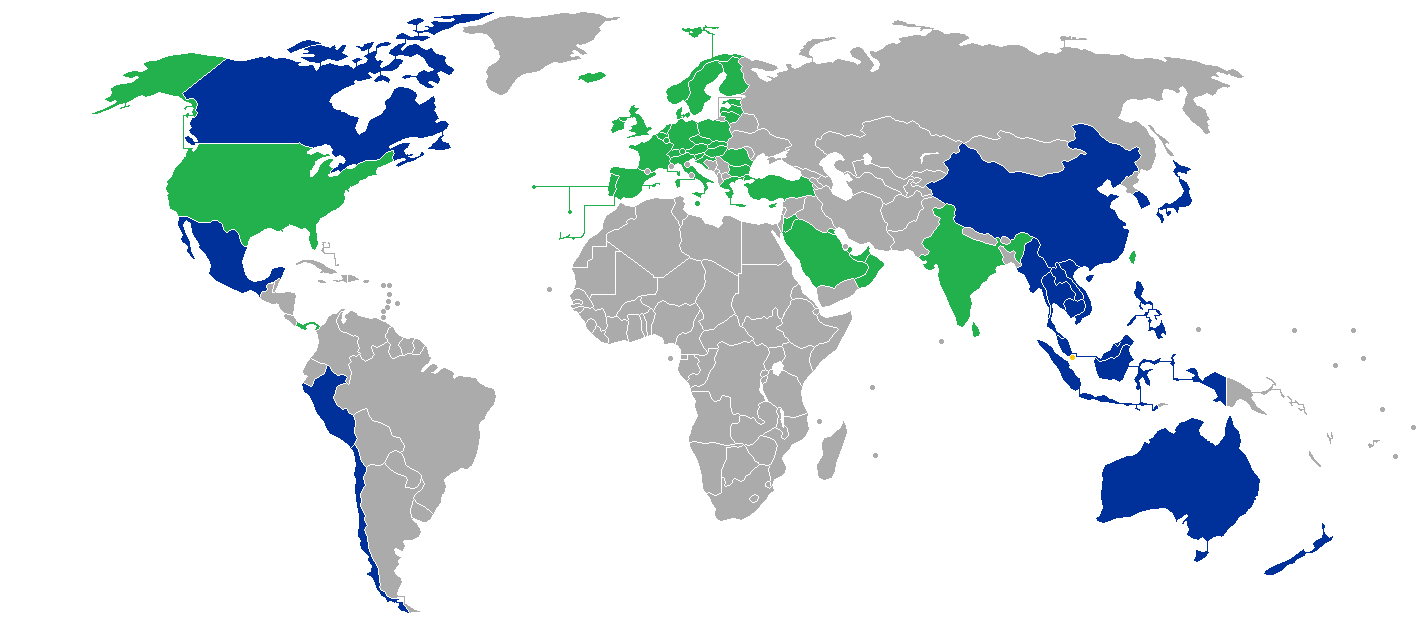
Singapore Bilateral Free Trade Agreements Multilateral Free Trade Agreements

Singapore has bilateral agreements with the following countries and blocs:

- Australia
- Brunei (Separate from ASEAN Free Trade Area)
- Chile
- Costa Rica
- People's Republic of China (Separate from ASEAN Free Trade Agreement)
- European Free Trade Association (EFTA)
- European Union (EU)
- Gulf Cooperation Council (GCC)
- Hong Kong (Separate from ASEAN Free Trade Agreement)
- India (Separate from ASEAN Free Trade Agreement)
- Japan (Separate from ASEAN Free Trade Agreement)
- Jordan
- New Zealand (Separate from the Trans-Pacific Strategic Economic Partnership and is still in force)
- Panama
- Peru
- South Korea (Separate from ASEAN Free Trade Agreement)
- Sri Lanka
- Republic of China (Taiwan)
- Turkey
- United Kingdom
- United States
- European Union

=== South Korea ===
South Korea Free-trade areas

South Korea has bilateral agreements with the following countries and blocs:

- ASEAN (entered in to force on 1 June 2007)
- Australia (see Korea–Australia Free Trade Agreement KAFTA) (entered in to force on 12 December 2014)
- Canada (see South Korea–Canada Free Trade Agreement) (entered in to force on 1 January 2015)
- Central America (Costa Rica, El Salvador, Honduras, Nicaragua, Panama) (entered in to force on 1 March 2021)
- China (see South Korea–China Free Trade Agreement) (entered in to force on 20 December 2015)
- Chile (entered in to force on 1 April 2004)
- Colombia (entered in to force on 15 July 2016)
- Ecuador (signed on 11 October 2023)
- European Free Trade Association (entered in to force on 1 September 2006)
- European Union (European Union–South Korea Free Trade Agreement) (entered in to force on 13 December 2015)
- Guatemala (signed on 9 January 2024)
- Gulf Cooperation Council (signed on 28 December 2023)
- India (see Comprehensive Economic Partnership Agreement) (entered in to force on 1 January 2010)
- Indonesia (entered in to force on 1 January 2023)
- Israel (see South Korea–Israel Free Trade Agreement) (entered in to force on 1 January 2023)
- New Zealand (entered in to force on 20 December 2015)
- Peru (see South Korea–Peru Free Trade Agreement) (entered in to force on 1 August 2011)
- Philippines (signed on 7 September 2023)
- Singapore (entered in to force on 2 March 2006)
- Turkey (entered in to force on 1 May 2013)
- United Arab Emirates (signed on 14 October 2023)
- United Kingdom (see South Korea–United Kingdom Free Trade Agreement) (entered in to force on 1 January 2021)
- United States (see South Korea–US Free Trade Agreement) (entered in to force on 1 March 2012)
- Vietnam (entered in to force on 20 December 2015)

=== Switzerland ===
Switzerland (which has a customs union with Liechtenstein, sometimes included in agreements) has bilateral agreements with the following countries and blocs:

- Albania (Signed: 17.12.2009: Entry into force: 01.11.2010)
- Bosnia-Herzegovina (Entry into force: 01.01.2015)
- Canada (Entry into force 01.07.2009)
- Chile (Entry into force: 01.12.2004)
- People's Republic of China (Entry into force: July 1, 2014)
- Colombia (Signed: 25.11.2008. Entry into force: 01.07.2011)
- Costa Rica (Entry into force: 29.08.2014)
- Ecuador (Entry into force: 01.11.2020)
- Egypt (Entry into force: 01.09.2008)
- European Union (Entry into force: 01.01.1973; bilateral CH–EU)
- Faeroe Islands (Entry into force: 01.03.1995; bilateral CH–Faeroe)
- GCC (Entry into force: 01.07.2014)
- Georgia (Entry into force: 01.05.2018)
- Hong Kong (Entry into force: 01.10.2012)
- Indonesia (Entry into force: 01.11.2021)
- Israel (Entry into force: 01.07.1993)
- Japan (Entry into force: 01.09.2009. Bilateral CH–Japan)
- Jordan (Entry into force: 01.09.2002)
- Republic of Korea (Entry into force: 01.09.2006)
- Lebanon (Entry into force: 01.01.2007)
- North Macedonia (Entry into force: 01.05.2002)
- Mexico (Entry into force: 01.07.2001)
- Morocco (Entry into force: 01.12.1999)
- Palestinian Authority (Entry into force: 01.07.1999)
- Panama (Entry into force: 29.08.2014)
- Peru (Signed: 24.06.2010 (EFTA) and 14.07.2010 (Peru). Entry into force on 01.07.2011)
- Philippines (Entry into force: 01.06.2018)
- Serbia (Signed: 17.12.2009: Entry into force: 01.10.2010)
- Singapore (Entry into force: 01.01.2003)
- SACU (Entry into force: 01.05.2008)
- Tunisia (Entry into force: 01.06.2006)
- Turkey (Entry into force: 01.04.1992)
- Ukraine (Signed 24.06.2010. Entry into force 01.06.2012)
- United Kingdom (Entry into force: 01.01.2021; bilateral CH–UK)

=== Taiwan ===
Taiwan has bilateral agreements with the following countries:

- Panama (2004)
- Guatemala (2006)
- People's Republic of China, Economic Cooperation Framework Agreement (2010)
- New Zealand (2013)
- Singapore (2014)
- Paraguay (2018)
- Eswatini (2018)
- Belize (2022)
- Marshall Islands (Signed in 2019 and approved in 2023, not yet in effect)

=== Tajikistan ===
Tajikistan has bilateral agreements with the following countries and blocs:

- Belarus
- Ukraine
- Uzbekistan

=== Thailand ===
Thailand has bilateral agreements with the following countries and blocs:

- Australia
- Bhutan
- Chile
- European Free Trade Association
- Japan (Japan–Thailand Economic Partnership Agreement signed in 2007)
- New Zealand
- Peru
- Sri Lanka
- United Arab Emirates

=== Tunisia ===
Tunisia has bilateral agreements with the following countries and blocs:

- Morocco
- European Free Trade Association
- Jordan
- Senegal
- Egypt
- Algeria
- Libya
- Mauritania
- Turkey

=== Turkey ===
Turkey Free trade agreements Turkey Agreement in force Agreement in force, provisionally applied Agreement signed, but not applied Agreement being negotiated

Turkey has bilateral and multilateral agreements with:

- European Free Trade Association (September 1, 1992, updated June 25, 2018)
- European Union (December 31, 1995)
- Organization of the Black Sea Economic Cooperation
- Economic Cooperation Organization Trade Agreement
- Albania (May 1, 2008)
- Azerbaijan (February 25, 2020)
- Bosnia-Herzegovina (July 1, 2003)
- Chile (March 1, 2011)
- Egypt (March 1, 2007)
- Faroe Islands (October 1, 2017)
- Georgia (November 1, 2008)
- Israel (May 1, 1997)
- Kosovo (September 1, 2019)
- Macedonia (September 7, 1999)
- Malaysia (August 1, 2015)
- Mauritius (June 1, 2013)
- Moldova (November 1, 2016)
- Montenegro (March 1, 2010)
- Morocco (January 1, 2006)
- Palestinian Authority (July 20, 2004)
- North Macedonia (September 1, 2000)
- Serbia (September 1, 2010, updated June 1, 2019)
- Singapore (October 1, 2017)
- South Korea (May 1, 2013, updated August 1, 2018)
- Tunisia (July 1, 2005)
- Ukraine (February 3, 2022)
- United Kingdom (December 29, 2020)
- Venezuela (May 17, 2018)

=== United Kingdom ===
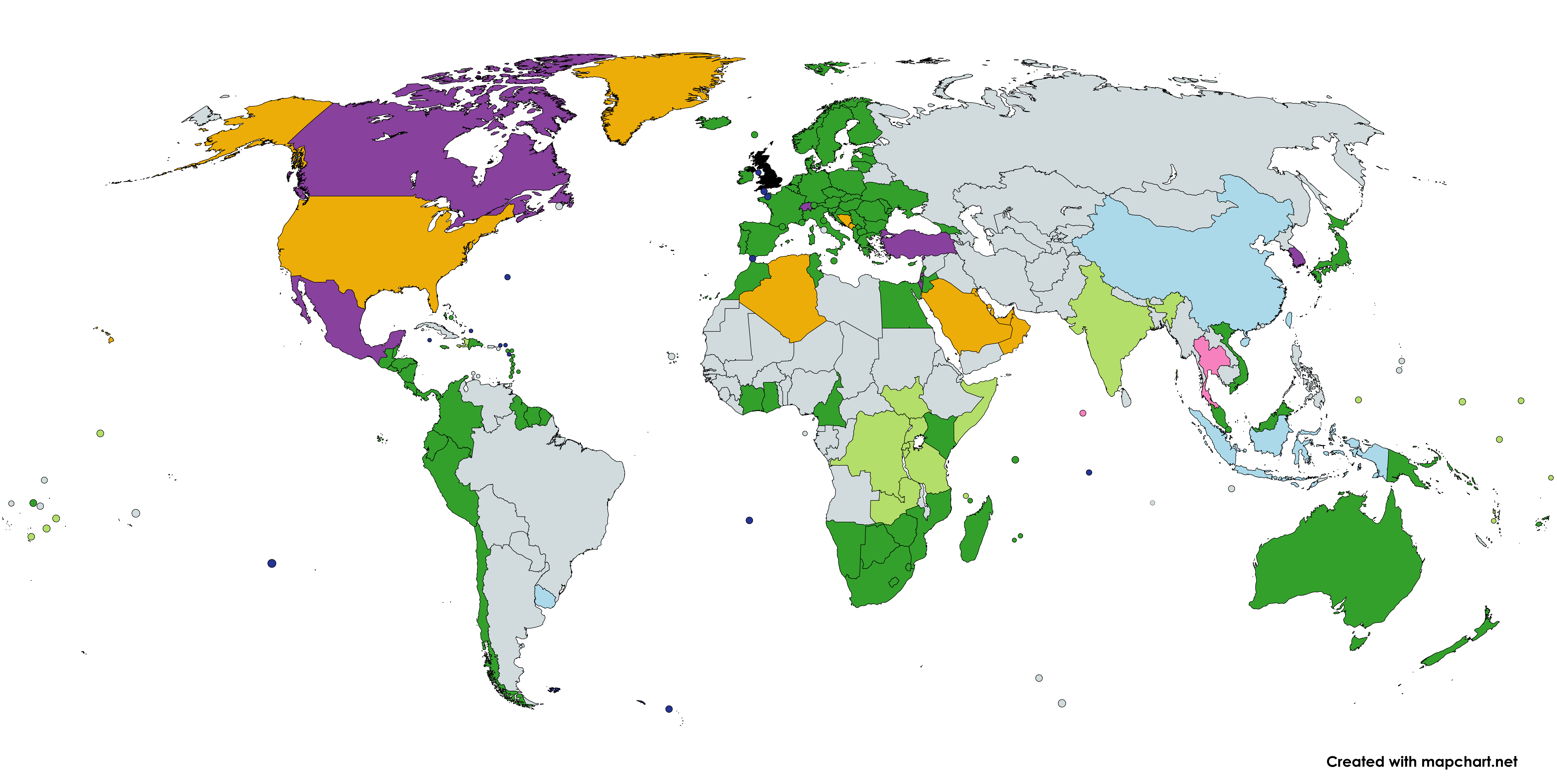
Free trade agreements of the United Kingdom United Kingdom Crown Dependencies and Overseas Territories Active agreements Renegotiating active agreements Agreement in principle Negotiations ongoing Discussions ongoing

The United Kingdom has bilateral and multilateral agreements with:

- Albania (2021)
- Andean Community (2021)
- Australia (2023)
- Cameroon (2021)
- Canada (2021)
- CARIFORUM (2021)
- Central America (2021)
- Chile (2021)
- Comprehensive and Progressive Agreement for Trans-Pacific Partnership (2024)
- East African Community (2021)
- Egypt (2021)
- European Union (2021)
- Faroe Islands (2021)
- Georgia (2021)
- Ghana (2021)
- Iceland (2021)
- Israel (2021)
- Ivory Coast (2021)
- Japan (2021)
- Jordan (2021)
- Kenya (2021)
- Kosovo (2021)
- Lebanon (2021)
- Liechtenstein (2021)
- Mexico (2021)
- Moldova (2021)
- Morocco (2021)
- New Zealand (2023)
- North Macedonia (2021)
- Norway (2021)
- Pacific States (2021)
- Palestinian Authority (2021)
- Serbia (2021)
- Singapore (2021)
- South Korea (2021)
- Southern Africa Customs Union and Mozambique (2021)
- Switzerland (2021)
- Tunisia (2021)
- Turkey (2021)
- Ukraine (2021)
- Vietnam (2021)

=== United States ===
United States Countries with U.S. free-trade agreements (bilateral, USMCA, and CAFTA-DR)

United States has bilateral agreements with the following countries and blocs:

- Australia
- Bahrain
- Canada
- Chile
- Colombia
- Costa Rica
- Dominican Republic
- El Salvador
- Guatemala
- Honduras
- Israel
- Japan
- Jordan
- Marshall Islands (Compact of Free Association)
- Mexico
- Micronesia (Compact of Free Association)
- Morocco
- Nicaragua
- Oman
- Panama
- Palau (Compact of Free Association)
- Peru
- South Korea
- Singapore

=== Vietnam ===
Vietnam has bilateral free trade agreements with the following countries and blocs:

- Japan (Entry into force in 2009)
- Chile (Entry into force in 2014)
- South Korea (Entry into force in 2015)
- European Union (Entry into force in 2020)
- United Kingdom (Entry into force in 2021)
- Israel (Entry into force in 17 November 2024)

=== Table (to be merged) ===
Agreement	Country	Country	Date
UK – South Korea Free Trade Agreement	UK	South Korea	August 22, 2019
UK – Central America Recognition Agreement	UK	Central America	July 18, 2019
UK – Andean Free Trade Agreement	UK	ANDEAN	May 15, 2019
UK – Iceland & Norway	UK	Iceland & Norway	April 2, 2019
UK – Liechtenstein Additional Agreement	UK	Liechtenstein	February 11, 2019
UK–Chile association agreement	UK	Chile	January 30, 2019
UK–New Zealand mutual recognition agreement	UK	New Zealand	January 21, 2019
UK–Australia Mutual Recognition Agreement	UK	Australia	January 18, 2019
UK–US mutual recognition agreement	UK	US	February 14, 2019
UK–PLO(Palestine Liberation Organization) Free Trade and Economic Partnership	UK	PLO (Palestine Liberation Organization)	February 18, 2019
UK–Pacific States economic partnership	UK	Pacific States (Block)	March 14, 2019
UK–ESA (Trade Block) economic partnership	UK	ESA (Trade Block)	January 31, 2019
UK–CARIFORUM (Trade Block) Economic Partnership	UK	CARIFORUM (Trade Block)	March 22, 2019
UK–Denmark (Faroe Islands) free trade agreement	UK	Denmark (Faroe Islands)	January 31, 2019
UK–Israel free trade agreement	UK	Israel	February 18, 2019
UK–Switzerland free trade agreement	UK	Switzerland	February 11, 2019
Armenia–Kazakhstan free trade agreement	Armenia	Kazakhstan	December 25, 2001
Armenia–Kyrgyzstan free trade agreement	Armenia	Kyrgyzstan	October 27, 1995
Armenia–Moldova free trade agreement	Armenia	Moldova	December 21, 1995
Armenia–Turkmenistan free trade agreement	Armenia	Turkmenistan	July 7, 1996
ASEAN–China Free Trade Area	Association of Southeast Asian Nations	People's Republic of China	January 1, 2010
Closer Economic Relations	Australia	New Zealand	1983
Australia–Chile Free Trade Agreement	Australia	Chile	2009
Korea–Australia FTA	Australia	Korea	2014
Australia–Singapore free trade agreement	Australia	Singapore	2016
Australia–Thailand free trade agreement	Australia	Thailand	2005
Australia–United States Free Trade Agreement	Australia	United States	2004
Australia–Japan Free Trade Agreement	Australia	Japan	2015
Australia–China Free Trade Agreement	Australia	People's Republic of China	2015
Canada–Chile Free Trade Agreement	Canada	Chile	
Canada–Colombia Free Trade Agreement	Canada	Colombia	August 15, 2011
Canada–Costa Rica Free Trade Agreement	Canada	Costa Rica	
Canada–Israel Free Trade Agreement	Canada	Israel	
Canada–Peru free trade agreement	Canada	Peru	
Chile–El Salvador free trade agreement	Chile	El Salvador	June 3, 2002
Chile–El Salvador free trade agreement	Chile	Costa Rica	
Chile–Costa Rica free trade agreement	Chile	Costa Rica	
Chile–Mexico Free Trade Agreement	Chile	Mexico	
Thailand–Chile Free Trade Agreement	Chile	Thailand	2013
Chile–Japan free trade agreement	Chile	Japan	September 3, 2007
Chile–South Korea free trade agreement	Chile	South Korea	April 1, 2004
China–Chile free trade agreement	Chile	People's Republic of China	October 1, 2006
China–Peru Free Trade Agreement	People's Republic of China	Peru	
China–Pakistan Free Trade Agreement	People's Republic of China	Pakistan	
China–Thailand free trade agreement	People's Republic of China	Thailand	
Mainland and Hong Kong Closer Economic Partnership Arrangement	People's Republic of China	Hong Kong	
Mainland and Macau Closer Economic Partnership Arrangement	People's Republic of China	Macau	
China–Singapore free trade agreement	People's Republic of China	Singapore	
Chile–Panama free trade agreement	Chile	Panama	March 7, 2008
Egypt–Turkey free trade agreement	Egypt	Turkey	
European Free Trade Association–Chile free trade agreement	European Free Trade Association	Chile	December 1, 2004
European Free Trade Association–Canada free trade agreement	European Free Trade Association	Canada	
European Free Trade Association–Israel free trade agreement	European Free Trade Association	Israel	
European Free Trade Association–Turkey free trade agreement	European Free Trade Association	Turkey	
European Union–Canada free trade agreement	European Union	Canada	
European Union–Chile free trade agreement	European Union	Chile	
Israel–Turkey free trade agreement	Israel	Turkey	
Morocco–Turkey free trade agreement	Morocco	Turkey	
New Zealand–China Free Trade Agreement	New Zealand	People's Republic of China	
Russia–Armenia free trade agreement	Russia	Armenia	March 25, 2003
Serbia–EU Free Trade Agreement (SAA)	Serbia	EU	2008
Serbia–EFTA Free Trade Agreement	Serbia	EFTA	2009
Serbia–CEFTA Free Trade Agreement	Serbia	CEFTA	2007
Serbia–Russia Free Trade Agreement	Serbia	Russia	2000
Serbia–Belarus Free Trade Agreement	Serbia	Belarus	2009
Serbia–Turkey Free Trade Agreement	Serbia	Turkey	2009
Serbia–Kazakhstan Free Trade Agreement	Serbia	Kazakhstan	2010
Turkey–Bosnia and Herzegovina free trade agreement	Turkey	Bosnia and Herzegovina	
Turkey–North Macedonia free trade agreement	Turkey	North Macedonia	
Pakistan–Turkey Free Trade Agreement	Turkey	Pakistan	
Turkey–Palestinian Authority free trade agreement	Turkey	Palestinian Authority	
Turkey–Tunisia free trade agreement	Turkey	Tunisia	
Ukraine–Armenia free trade agreement	Ukraine	Armenia	
United States–Israel Free Trade Agreement	United States	Israel	1985
United States–Jordan Free Trade Agreement	United States	Jordan	2001
United States–Chile Free Trade Agreement	United States	Chile	2004
United States–Singapore Free Trade Agreement	United States	Singapore	2004
United States–Bahrain Free Trade Agreement	United States	Bahrain	2006
United States–Morocco Free Trade Agreement	United States	Morocco	2006
United States–Oman Free Trade Agreement	United States	Oman	2006
United States–Peru Trade Promotion Agreement	United States	Peru	2007
Japan–Vietnam free trade agreement	Japan	Vietnam	

== Signed agreements ==
Agreements that have been negotiated and signed by the respective heads of states of each country, but not yet ratified by the country's legislative body.

Agreement	Country	Country	Date
Chile–Peru Free Trade Agreement	Chile	Peru	August 22, 2006
Chile–Honduras Free Trade Agreement	Chile	Honduras	
Colombia–Panama Free Trade Agreement	Colombia	Panama	September 13, 2013
Economic Partnership Agreement	European Union	Caribbean Community	November 1, 2008
Malaysia–New Zealand Free Trade Agreement	Malaysia	New Zealand	October 26, 2009
Peru-Australia Free Trade Agreement	Peru	Australia	February 12, 2018
European Union–Vietnam Free Trade Agreement	Vietnam	European Union	August 1, 2020

== Proposed bilateral agreements ==
List of agreements being in negotiations and being proposed to be signed by the respective parties involved:

- Afghanistan
  - Iran
  - Uzbekistan
- Association of Southeast Asian Nations (ASEAN)
  - African Union
  - Bangladesh
  - Canada
  - European Union
  - Eurasian Economic Union
  - Gulf Cooperation Council
  - Pakistan
  - United Kingdom
- Australia
  - Brunei (Separate from ASEAN - Australia Free Trade Agreement)
  - Colombia
  - European Union
  - Gulf Cooperation Council
  - United Arab Emirates
- Azerbaijan
  - Turkey
- Bangladesh
  - ASEAN
  - Bhutan
  - Brazil
  - India
  - Nepal
  - Pakistan
  - Sri Lanka
  - Turkey
- Bhutan
  - Bangladesh
  - Nepal
  - Pakistan
  - Sri Lanka
- Brunei
  - Australia (Separate from ASEAN - Australia Free Trade Agreement)
  - United States
- Cambodia
  - Eurasian Economic Union
  - Japan
  - South Korea
- Canada
  - Andean Community
  - CARICOM
  - Chile
  - Guatemala, El Salvador, Honduras, and Nicaragua (Canada Central American Free Trade Agreement)
  - Dominican Republic
  - European Union
  - Singapore (negotiations concluded, to be signed)
  - United Kingdom
- Caribbean Community (CARICOM)
  - Canada (Negotiations for the Free Trade Agreement is currently ongoing)
  - European Union (On-going negotiation on the EPA) ("Economic Partnership Agreement")
  - MERCOSUR (Open for discussions since May 2005)
- Chile
  - Australia
  - Canada
  - Guatemala
  - India
  - Nicaragua
- Mainland China
  - Gulf Cooperation Council (GCC) – China–GCC Free Trade Agreement
  - Israel – China–Israel Free Trade Agreement
  - Japan and South Korea: China–Japan–Korea Free Trade Agreement
  - Norway – China–Norway Free Trade Agreement
  - Sri Lanka – China–Sri Lanka Free Trade Agreement
- Costa Rica
  - Australia
  - Japan
  - Malaysia
  - New Zealand
  - Vietnam
- Colombia
  - Australia
  - Japan
  - New Zealand
  - Turkey
- Eurasian Economic Union
  - ASEAN
  - Cambodia
  - India
  - Israel
  - MERCOSUR
  - Mongolia
  - Tunisia
- European Union
  - ACP countries via Economic Partnership Agreements (EPA)
    - European Union Economic Partnership Agreement with the Pacific ACP Countries (EU–PACP)
  - Andean Community (Exclude Bolivia) (Only applies to Colombia, Ecuador and Peru) (AA)
  - Angola (SIFA: Sustainable Investment Facilitation Agreement)
  - CACM + Panama
  - Kenya (Economic Partnership Agreement) (EPA)
  - Kosovo (Stabilisation and Association Agreement) (SAA)
  - Moldova (Association Agreement) (AA)
  - New Zealand (Free Trade Agreement) (FTA)
  - United States (Transatlantic Trade and Investment Partnership)
  - Russia (EU–Russia Common Economic Space)
  - Andean Community
  - South Korea (European Union–Korea Free Trade Agreement)
  - European Union Central American Association Agreement (EU–CAAA)
- European Free Trade Association
  - Albania
  - Ukraine
- Gulf Cooperation Council (GCC)
  - ASEAN
  - India
  - New Zealand
  - Turkey
- India
  - Bangladesh
  - BIMSTEC
  - Canada (under negotiation)
  - Chile (under negotiation)
  - Eurasian Economic Union
  - Gulf Cooperation Council (under negotiation)
  - Israel (under negotiation)
  - Peru
  - South Africa
  - United States (negotiations concluded, to be signed)
- Israel
  - China
  - Eurasian Economic Union
  - Guatemala
  - India
  - Vietnam
- Japan
  - Gulf Cooperation Council
  - Australia (Conducting feasibility study as of 19 September 2006)
  - New Zealand – (Conducting feasibility study as of 14 May 2008)
- Jordan
  - Iraq
  - Palestinian Authority
  - Pakistan
- New Zealand
  - United States
  - South Korea
  - Japan
  - Hong Kong
  - Cooperation Council for the Arab States of the Gulf
  - Association of Southeast Asian Nations
  - Peru
  - Vietnam
  - India
  - Russia
- Peru
  - Mexico
  - Costa Rica
- Republic of China (Taiwan)
  - Dominican Republic
  - European Union
  - India
  - United States
- Russia
  - European Union
  - New Zealand
- Serbia is negotiating bilateral free trade agreements with the following countries and blocs:
  - Ukraine
- Singapore is negotiating bilateral free trade agreements with the following countries and blocs:
  - EU (negotiations concluded, to be signed)
  - Singapore – Canada
  - Egypt
  - Mexico
  - Pakistan
  - Panama
  - Sri Lanka
- South Korea (Source: Ministry of Foreign Affairs and Trade, Minister for Trade – Free Trade Agreement Department) is negotiating or is planning bilateral agreements with the following countries and blocs:
  - Mexico (SECA 3rd round of talks in 14~16 June 2006)
  - Canada(10th round of talks in 23 April ~ 27 April 2007, Seoul)
  - MERCOSUR (preparation study)
  - People's Republic of China: China–South Korea Free Trade Agreement (preparation study)
  - Gulf Cooperation Council (GCC) (preparation study)
  - Japan (negotiations at standstill)
- Switzerland is negotiating or is planning bilateral agreements with the following countries and blocs:
  - Russia/Belarus/Kazakhstan (Negotiations in preparation 2010, suspended)
  - MERCOSUR (In negotiations 2019)
  - Algeria (In negotiations 2010, suspended)
  - Thailand (In negotiations 2010)
  - Vietnam (Joint feasibility study 2010)
  - India (In negotiations 2010)
  - Guatemala (In negotiations 2014)
  - Honduras (In negotiations 2014, suspended)
  - Malaysia (In negotiations 2010)
- Ukraine
  - Canada
  - European Union
  - Israel
  - Singapore
- United Kingdom
  - Algeria
  - ASEAN
  - Bangladesh
  - Belarus
  - Bosnia and Herzegovina
  - Brazil
  - Cambodia
  - Canada
  - China
  - Greenland
  - Gulf Cooperation Council
  - Hong Kong
  - India
  - Indonesia
  - Israel
  - Kazakhstan
  - Maldives
  - Mercosur
  - Mexico
  - Montenegro
  - Pakistan
  - Philippines
  - Russia
  - South Korea
  - Sri Lanka
  - Switzerland
  - Taiwan
  - Thailand
  - Turkey
  - United States
- United States :
  - Colombia Trade Promotion Agreement (2008?)
  - Panama – United States Trade Promotion Agreement (2008?)
  - United States–Thailand Free Trade Agreement (on hold since the 2006 Thai coup d'état)
  - United States–New Zealand Free Trade Agreement
  - United States–Ghana Free Trade Agreement
  - United States–Indonesia Free Trade Agreement
  - United States–Kenya Free Trade Agreement
  - United States–Kuwait Free Trade Agreement (Expert-level trade talks held in February 2006) (part of US–MEFTA initiative)
  - United States–Malaysia Free Trade Agreement (next meeting on January 14, 2008 in Kuala Lumpur)
  - United States–Mauritius Free Trade Agreement
  - United States–Mozambique Free Trade Agreement
  - United States–United Arab Emirates Free Trade Agreement (5th round of talks are yet to be scheduled) (part of US–MEFTA initiative)
  - United States–Southern African Customs Union Free Trade Agreement (on hold since 2006 due to US demands on intellectual property rights, government procurement rights and investment)
  - United States–Ecuador Free Trade Agreement
  - United States–Qatar Free Trade Agreement (on hold since 2006) (part of US–MEFTA initiative)

== Obsolete agreements ==
The following bilateral free trade agreements are no longer active.

Parties	Signed	Effective	Obsolete	Superseded by	Ref.
France; United Kingdom	23 January 1860	23 January 1860	1 January 1892	—N/a	
Belgium; United Kingdom	23 July 1862	23 July 1862	1 August 1897	—N/a	
South Africa; Southern Rhodesia	6 December 1948	1 April 1949	1 January 1955	—N/a	
Ghana; Upper Volta	28 June 1962	9 May 1962	31 December 1966	—N/a	
Australia; New Zealand	31 August 1965	1 January 1966	1 January 1983	ANZCERTA	
Ireland; United Kingdom	19 December 1965	1 July 1966	1 January 1973	European Economic Community	
Canada; United States	2 January 1988	1 January 1989	1 January 1994	NAFTA; Canada; Mexico; United States	
EFTA; Turkey	10 December 1991	1 April 1992	1 October 2021	Revised FTA between the two parties.	
Armenia; Russia	30 September 1992	25 March 1993	17 October 2012	Commonwealth of Independent States Free Trade Area	
Kyrgyzstan; Russia	8 October 1992	24 April 1993	13 December 2013	Commonwealth of Independent States Free Trade Area	
Croatia; European Union	29 October 2001	1 March 2002	1 July 2013	European Union	
Croatia; EFTA	21 June 2001	1 April 2002	24 November 2013	European Union	
Croatia; Turkey	13 March 2002	1 July 2003	1 July 2013	European Union	
Bulgaria; Serbia and Montenegro	13 November 2003	1 June 2001	1 January 2007	—N/a	
Romania; Serbia and Montenegro	23 December 2003	1 July 2004	1 January 2007	—N/a	
Croatia; Serbia and Montenegro	14 June 2004	1 July 2004	1 May 2007	—N/a	
Albania; Serbia and Montenegro	13 November 2003	1 September 2004	1 May 2007	—N/a	
Moldova; Serbia and Montenegro	13 November 2003	1 September 2004	1 May 2007	—N/a	
Jordan; Turkey	22 December 2004	1 December 2009	22 November 2018	—N/a	
Nicaragua; Taiwan	16 June 2006	1 January 2008	1 July 2022	—N/a	
Colombia; United Kingdom	18 October 2019	1 January 2021	28 June 2021	Andean Countries; United Kingdom	

== See also ==
- Free-trade area

For an interactive list of bilateral and multilateral free trade instruments see the TREND-Analytics website.
