= Free trade agreements of the United States =

United States Countries with U.S. free trade agreements (bilateral, USMCA, and CAFTA-DR)

The United States is party to many free trade agreements (FTAs) worldwide.

Beginning with the Theodore Roosevelt administration, the United States became a major player in international trade, especially with its neighboring territories in the Caribbean and Latin America. The United States helped negotiate the General Agreement on Tariffs and Trade (later the World Trade Organization).

== Active agreements ==
The following agreements are currently in effect, signature and entry into force dates are as listed by the World Trade Organization.

Nation (s)	No of nations represented	Signed	Effective	Treaty	Ref.
Australia	1	May 18, 2004	January 1, 2005	Australia–United States Free Trade Agreement	
Bahrain	1	September 14, 2005	August 1, 2006	Bahrain–United States Free Trade Agreement	
CAFTA-DR; Costa Rica; Dominican Republic; El Salvador; Guatemala; Honduras; Nicaragua	6	August 5, 2004	March 1, 2006	Dominican Republic–Central America Free Trade Agreement	
Chile	1	June 6, 2003	January 1, 2004	Chile–United States Free Trade Agreement	
Colombia	1	November 20, 2006	May 15, 2012	United States–Colombia Free Trade Agreement	
Israel; Palestine Authority	2	April 22, 1985	August 19, 1985	Israel–United States Free Trade Agreement	
Jordan	1	October 24, 2000	December 17, 2001	Jordan–United States Free Trade Agreement	
Morocco	1	June 15, 2004	January 1, 2009	Morocco–United States Free Trade Agreement	
Oman	1	November 15, 2004	January 1, 2006	Oman–United States Free Trade Agreement	
Panama	1	June 28, 2007	October 31, 2012	Panama–United States Trade Promotion Agreement	
Peru	1	April 12, 2006	February 1, 2009	Peru–United States Trade Promotion Agreement	
Singapore	1	May 6, 2003	January 1, 2004	Singapore–United States Free Trade Agreement	
South Korea	1	June 30, 2007	March 15, 2012	United States–Korea Free Trade Agreement	
USMCA; Canada; Mexico	2	November 30, 2018	July 1, 2020	United States–Mexico–Canada Agreement	

== Negotiations ==
The following agreements have begun negotiations since 2020.

Nation (s)	No of nations represented	Status	Note	Treaty	Ref.
Kenya	1	Negotiations ongoing	Eighth round of negotiations took place in September 2024.	Kenya–United States Free Trade Agreement	
United Kingdom	1	Negotiations stagnated	Fifth round of negotiations took place in October 2020.	United Kingdom–United States Free Trade Agreement	

== Obsolete agreements ==
Nation (s)	No of nations represented	Signed	Effective	Obsolete	Treaty	Superseded by	Ref.
Canada	1	January 2, 1988	January 1, 1989	January 1, 1994	Canada–United States Free Trade Agreement	NAFTA; Canada; Mexico	
NAFTA; Canada; Mexico	2	December 17, 1992	January 1, 1994	July 1, 2020	North American Free Trade Agreement	USMCA; Canada; Mexico	

== Failed proposals ==
Free Trade Area of the Americas

- Antigua and Barbuda
- Argentina
- Bahamas
- Barbados
- Belize
- Bolivia
- Brazil
- Canada
- Chile
- Colombia
- Costa Rica
- Dominica
- Dominican Republic
- Ecuador
- El Salvador
- Grenada
- Guatemala
- Guyana
- Haiti
- Honduras
- Jamaica
- Mexico
- Nicaragua
- Panama
- Paraguay
- Peru
- Saint Kitts and Nevis
- Saint Lucia
- Saint Vincent and the Grenadines
- Suriname
- Trinidad and Tobago
- United States
- Uruguay
- Venezuela

United States–Thailand Free Trade Agreement

- Thailand

Trans-Pacific Partnership

- Australia
- Brunei
- Canada
- Chile
- Japan
- Malaysia
- Mexico
- New Zealand
- Peru
- Singapore
- Vietnam

Transatlantic Trade and Investment Partnership

- European Union

== See also ==
- Bilateral Investment Treaty
- European Union free trade agreements
- Free trade agreements of the United Kingdom
- List of free trade agreements
- Trade and Investment Framework Agreement
- List of the United States treaties
