= Foreign and intergovernmental relations of Puerto Rico =

The foreign and intergovernmental relations of Puerto Rico are governed by the Commerce and Territorial Clause of the Constitution of the United States. Because of this, Puerto Rico is subject to the plenary powers of Congress. Nonetheless, Puerto Rico has established relations with foreign nations, particularly with Hispanic American countries such as Colombia and Panama. The establishment of such relations, however, requires permission from the U.S. Department of State or Congress itself. (Note: Caribbean Business (2013) "In 2003, then-U.S. Secretary of State Colin Powell [...] reportedly warned of any commonwealth gesture to join international organisms as an independent entity without the approval of the U.S. State Department.") Still, most relations are already set by existent laws or trade agreements established beforehand by the United States that supersede the relation pursued by Puerto Rico.

At the local level, Puerto Rico established through a domestic law that its foreign affairs must be managed by the Department of State of Puerto Rico, an executive department. The executive officer of this department is known as the Secretary of State of Puerto Rico.

In a similar fashion, the Puerto Rico Federal Affairs Administration, along with the Office of the Resident Commissioner, manage all the intergovernmental affairs of Puerto Rico before entities of, or in, the United States. These entities include the federal government of the United States, local and state governments of the United States, and public or private entities in the United States. Both offices frequently assist the Department of State of Puerto Rico in engaging with Washington, D.C.–based ambassadors and federal agencies that handle Puerto Rico's foreign affairs, such as the U.S. Department of State and the Agency for International Development (USAID).

In terms of leadership, the Administration is headed by a director while the Office is headed by the Resident Commissioner of Puerto Rico. Politically, the resident commissioner possesses a higher rank as she is the delegate elected by Puerto Ricans to represent them in Congress, specifically within the U.S. House of Representatives. Her rank stems from the right to serve on congressional committees, a right she exercises in every aspect like that of any other legislator, except being denied a vote on the final disposition of legislation on the House floor.

== History ==
Prior to the arrival of Spaniards, the natives of Puerto Rico, the Taíno, had direct foreign relations with other tribes of the Caribbean. For example, they were known to have amicable relations with the tribes settled in the Greater and the Lesser Antilles, while it is widely believed that they were historical enemies of the Carib. It is unknown, however, if this applied to the Taíno of Puerto Rico, as archeologists believe they may have been allies with the Carib at some point. Findings so far have been inconclusive.

Upon the arrivals of Spaniards in 1493, Puerto Rico opened up to both the New and the Old World, establishing trading routes with North, Central and South America, as well as routes with Spain, Portugal and Africa. Trading of vegetables, fruits, slaves, and minerals became an integral part of Puerto Rico's international development afterwards.

After Puerto Rico was ceded to the United States as part of the Treaty of Paris, the United States and Puerto Rico began a long-standing metropolis-colony relationship. It is at this time that Puerto Rico became subject to the Commercial and Territory Clause of the U.S. Constitution, clauses that restrict how and with whom can Puerto Rico engage internationally. (Note: Caribbean Business (2013) "An internal agency memo from a decade ago said: 'Under the U.S. Constitution, the federal government has the sole responsibility for the conduct of U.S. foreign relations, and this includes the foreign relations that relate to U.S. territories.'") The territory also became, as a byproduct, subject to the different treaties and trade agreements ratified by the United States.

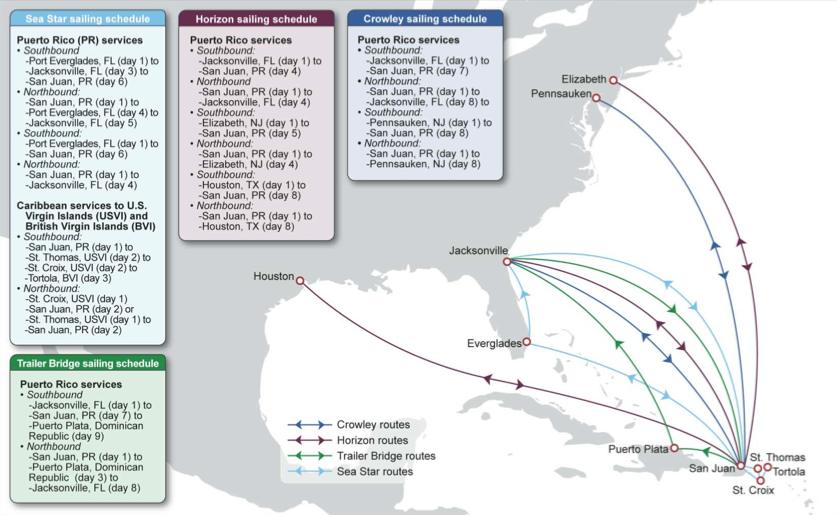
Map of Jones Act carrier routes for Puerto Rico.

In 1920, after the enactment of the Merchant Marine Act of 1920 (also known as the Jones Act), Puerto Rico became restricted on which merchant marine it can use to import and export products. This is because the Jones Act prevents foreign-flagged ships from carrying cargo between two American ports (a practice known as cabotage). Under the Jones Act, foreign ships inbound with goods from Central and South America, Western Europe, and Africa cannot stop in Puerto Rico, offload Puerto Rico-bound goods, load mainland-bound Puerto Rico-manufactured goods, and continue to U.S. ports. (Note: 46 App. U.S. Code § 883. "No merchandise, including merchandise owned by the United States Government, a State [...], or a subdivision of a State, shall be transported by water [...] between points in the United States, including Districts, Territories, and possessions thereof embraced within the coastwise laws, either directly or via a foreign port, or for any part of the transportation, in any other vessel than a vessel built in and documented under the laws of the United States and owned by persons who are citizens of the United States [...]") Instead, they must proceed directly to U.S. ports, where distributors break bulk and send Puerto Rico-bound manufactured goods to Puerto Rico across the ocean by U.S.-flagged ships. (Note: Gutierrez. "The “cabotage” laws impose significant restrictions on commerce between Puerto Rico and the U. S. mainland by requiring that merchandise and produce shipped by water between U.S. ports be shipped only on U.S.-built, U.S.- manned, U.S.-flagged, and U.S.-citizen owned vessels.") In February 2025, Governor Jennifer Gonzalez-Colón announced a request by the government of Puerto Rico for a permanent exemption from air cabotage laws in Puerto Rico.

In modern times, Puerto Rico has been able to establish several trade agreements mostly with Hispanic American nations due to their cultural and linguistic similarities. Today, Puerto Rico has trade agreements with Colombia and Panama, along with strong ties with its neighbors in the Caribbean Sea, particularly with the Dominican Republic and the United States Virgin Islands.

In March 2025, the Connecticut State Commerce Commission approved a bill introduced by Connecticut's Latino legislators, Bill 5008, to establish a Connecticut-Puerto Rico Trade Commission. The commission would be charged with promoting trade and academic exchanges between the state and Puerto Rico, initiating action on policy issues of mutual interest, and encouraging mutual investment in the infrastructure of both states. Commission members would serve without compensation but would be entitled to reimbursement for necessary expenses.

== International organizations ==
Puerto Rico is restricted to join international organizations without the consent of the United States due to its current political status. However, due to its geographical and cultural nature, the U.S. Department of State allows Puerto Rico to be an observer in most international organizations to which it would potentially belong to if Puerto Rico were a sovereign state. (Note: Caribbean Business (2013) "The U.S. State Department has previously given the green-light to Puerto Rico's active participation in limited international forums.")

Name	Abbreviation	Category	Status	Headquartered
Caribbean Community	CARICOM	regional	observer	Georgetown, Guyana
Caribbean Tourism Organization	CTO	tourism	observer	Bridgetown, Barbados
International Olympic Committee	IOC	sports	full member	Lausanne, Switzerland
Organization of American States	OAS	continental	observer	Washington, D.C., United States
United Nations Economic Commission for Latin America and the Caribbean	ECLAC	regional	associate member (Note: ECLAC defines an 'associate member' as a non-independent territory.)	Santiago, Chile

Puerto Rico was denied observer status by the U.S. Department of State within the Community of Latin American and Caribbean States (CELAC) due to the anti-American rhetoric of some of its founders, namely Bolivia, Cuba, and Venezuela. However, on January 9, 2014, Venezuelan President Nicolas Maduro announced a proposed plan to incorporate Puerto Rico into CELAC, without waiting for required U.S. federal consent.

== Trade agreements ==
Countries with whom Puerto Rico can freely engage in trade without diplomatic restrictions
Country	Region	Agreement	Established trade promotion office in foreign country
Australia	Oceania	AUSFTA	No
Bahrain	Western Asia	USBFTA	No
Canada	North America	NAFTA	No
Chile	South America	ChFTA	No
Colombia	South America	CFTA	Yes
Costa Rica	Central America	CAFTA	No
Dominican Republic	Caribbean	CAFTA	Yes
El Salvador	Central America	CAFTA	No
Guatemala	Central America	CAFTA	No
Honduras	Central America	CAFTA	No
Israel	Western Asia	USIFTA	No
Jordan	Western Asia	USJFTA	No
Mexico	North America	NAFTA	No
Morocco	North Africa	USMFTA	No
Nicaragua	Central America	CAFTA	No
Oman	Western Asia	OFTA	No
Panama	Central America	PTPA	Yes
Peru	South America	USPTPA	Yes
Singapore	Southeast Asia	USSFTA	No
South Korea	East Asia	KFTA	No
United States	North America	NAFTA	Yes

== Military conflicts ==
The federal government of the United States is responsible for the military protection of Puerto Rico. Residents of Puerto Rico who are either citizens or permanent residents can serve in the United States armed forces. At the local level, Puerto Rico has its own national guard, namely the Puerto Rico National Guard. The governor of Puerto Rico is the local commander-in-chief, while the national commander-in-chief is the President of the United States. Puerto Ricans have served in the U.S. armed forces in every conflict since World War I and, most recently, have been part of the war on terror including the War in Afghanistan and the Iraq War.

== See also ==
- Foreign relations of the United States
