= Fast track (trade) =

Power of POTUS to negotiate trade deals

The fast track authority for brokering trade agreements was the authority of the President of the United States to negotiate international agreements in an expedited manner and with limited congressional oversight. Renamed the trade promotion authority (TPA) in 2002, the TPA was an impermanent power granted by Congress to the President. It remained in effect from 1975 to 1994, pursuant to the Trade Act of 1974 and from 2002 to 2007 pursuant to the Trade Act of 2002. Although it technically expired in July 2007, it remained in effect for agreements that were already under negotiation until their passage in 2011. In June 2015, a third renewal passed Congress and was signed into law by President Barack Obama, which expired in 2021 and was not renewed.

Under the TPA, the President's trade negotiations followed guidelines and negotiating objectives set by Congress. If the negotiations followed the negotiating objectives, the implementing bill could pass Congress on majority votes instead of the three-fifths threshold normally needed in the Senate to conclude debate on a bill or the two-thirds threshold for the Senate to ratify a treaty. Congress could not amend or filibuster the implementing bill. The TPA was the mechanism used by the U.S. government to pass the North American Free Trade Agreement as well as other congressional-executive agreements. It was praised for allowing the government to negotiate trade deals which would otherwise have been impossible to complete. However, it was also criticized for usurping congressional powers and for lacking transparency.

== Content and scope ==
The TPA had the effect of delegating congressional power to the executive branch with limitations. Fast track agreements were enacted as "congressional-executive agreements" (CEAs), which were negotiated for by the executive branch following set guidelines from Congress, and were approved by a majority in both chambers of Congress. Without the TPA legislation, the President's power to negotiate trade deals is restricted by Article II, Section 2, of the U.S. Constitution which states that: "[The President] shall have Power, by and with the Advice and Consent of the Senate, to make Treaties, provided two thirds of the Senators present concur."

If a trade agreement that reduces tariffs or non-tariff barriers to trade negotiated by the executive branch met the guidelines set by Congress, the TPA allowed Congress to "consider the required implementing bill under expedited procedures pursuant to which the bill may come to the floor without action by the leadership." The implementing bill was guaranteed an up-or-down vote with no amendments. An implementing bill could go through the expedited process if it followed the congressional guides and: (1) the trade agreement was negotiated during a set time period for which the TPA is in effect; (2) the agreement follows negotiation objectives set by the statute; and (3) during the negotiation process, the executive branch sent required notifications and conducted consultations with Congress and other stakeholders. The 2002 version of the authority created an additional requirement for 90-day notice to Congress before negotiations could begin.

The 1979 version of the authority changed the name of the STR to the U.S. Trade Representative.

=== Congressional procedure ===
If the President transmitted a fast track trade agreement to Congress, then the majority leaders of the House and Senate or their designees must have introduced the implementing bill submitted by the President on the first day on which their House was in session. (19 U.S.C. § 2191(c)(1).) Senators and Representatives could not amend the President's bill, either in committee or in the Senate or House. (19 U.S.C. § 2191(d).) The committees to which the bill had been referred had 45 days after its introduction to report the bill, or they were automatically discharged, and each House must have voted within 15 days after the bill was reported or discharged. (19 U.S.C. § 2191(e)(1).)

In the likely case that the bill was a revenue bill (as tariffs are revenues), the bill must have originated in the House (see U.S. Const., art I, sec. 7). After the bill passed in the House, it was sent to the Senate where the Senate Finance Committee had jurisdiction. (19 U.S.C. § 2191(e)(2).) On the House and Senate floors, each body could debate the bill for no more than 20 hours, and thus Senators could not filibuster the bill and it would pass with a simple majority vote. (19 U.S.C. § 2191(f)-(g).) Thus, it was possible that the entire Congressional consideration of a bill took no longer than 90 days.

=== Negotiating objectives ===
According to the Congressional Research Service, Congress categorized trade negotiating objectives in three ways: overall objectives, principal objectives, and other priorities. The broader goals encapsulated the overall direction trade negotiations take, such as enhancing the United States' and other countries' economies. Principal objectives were detailed goals that Congress expected to be integrated into trade agreements, such as "reducing barriers and distortions to trade (e.g., goods, services, agriculture); protecting foreign investment and intellectual property rights; encouraging transparency; establishing fair regulatory practices; combating corruption; ensuring that countries enforced their environmental and labor laws; providing for an effective dispute settlement process; and protecting the U.S. right to enforce its trade remedy laws". Consulting Congress was also an important objective.

Principal objectives included:

- Market access: These negotiating objectives sought to reduce or eliminate barriers that limit market access for U.S. products. "It also calls for the use of sectoral tariff and non-tariff barrier elimination agreements to achieve greater market access."
- Services: Services objectives "require that U.S. negotiator strive to reduce or eliminate barriers to trade in services, including regulations that deny nondiscriminatory treatment to U.S. services and inhibit the right of establishment (through foreign investment) to U.S. service providers."
- Agriculture: There were three negotiating objectives regarding agriculture. One laid out in greater detail what U.S. negotiators should achieve in negotiating robust trade rules on sanitary and phytosanitary (SPS) measures. The second called for trade negotiators to ensure transparency in how tariff-rate quotas are administered that may impede market access opportunities. The third sought to eliminate and prevent the improper use of a country's system to protect or recognize geographical indications (GI). These were trademark-like terms used to protect the quality and reputation of distinctive agricultural products, wines and spirits produced in a particular region of a country. This new objective was intended to counter in large part the European Union's efforts to include GI protection in its bilateral trade agreements for the names of its products that U.S. and other country exporters argue are generic in nature or commonly used across borders, such as parma ham or Parmesan cheese.”
- Investment/Investor rights: “The overall negotiating objectives on foreign investment are designed “to reduce or eliminate artificial or trade distorting barriers to foreign investment, while ensuring that foreign investors in the United States are not accorded greater substantive rights with respect to investment protections than domestic investors in the United States, and to secure for investors important rights comparable to those that would be available under the United States legal principles and practices."

The 2002 and 2015 versions of the TPA set trade negotiation objectives on worker rights, labor issues, and environmental standards. The 2002 version stated a country which the executive branch negotiated a trade agreement with had to follow their own labor and environmental standards, while the 2015 version added that the country had to follow their own set standards but also had to follow "internationally recognized" core labor standards and environmental standards.

== Enactment and history ==
Congress started the fast track authority in the Trade Act of 1974, § 151–154 (19 U.S.C. § 2191–2194). This authority was set to expire in 1980, but was extended for eight years in 1979. By that grant of authority and procedure, Congress then enacted implementing legislation for the U.S.-Israel Free Trade Area and the U.S.-Canada Free Trade Agreement. TPA authority was renewed from 1988 to 1993 to allow for negotiation of the North American Free Trade Agreement (NAFTA), and the commencement of the Uruguay Round, of the General Agreement on Tariffs and Trade (GATT). With this grant of authority, Congress eventually enacted legislation implementing NAFTA. TPA authority was then further extended to April 16, 1994, the day after the Uruguay Round concluded in the Marrakech Agreement, transitioning GATT into the World Trade Organization (WTO). Under this authority, Congress ultimately passed the implementing legislation for the Uruguay Round Agreements Act.

In the second half of the 1990s, fast track authority languished due to opposition from House Republicans. Republican Presidential candidate George W. Bush made fast track part of his campaign platform in 2000. In May 2001, as president he made a speech about the importance of free trade at the annual Council of the Americas in New York, founded by David Rockefeller and other senior U.S. businessmen in 1965. Subsequently, the Council played a role in the implementation and securing of TPA through Congress.

At 3:30 a.m. on July 27, 2002, the House passed the Trade Act of 2002 narrowly by a 215 to 212 vote with 190 Republicans and 27 Democrats making up the majority. The bill passed the Senate by a vote of 64 to 34 on August 1, 2002. The Trade Act of 2002, § 2103–2105 (19 U.S.C. § 3803–3805), extended and conditioned the application of the original procedures. Under the second period of fast track authority, Congress enacted implementing legislation for the U.S.–Chile Free Trade Agreement, the U.S.–Singapore Free Trade Agreement, the Australia–U.S. Free Trade Agreement, the U.S.–Morocco Free Trade Agreement, the Dominican Republic–Central America Free Trade Agreement, the U.S.–Bahrain Free Trade Agreement, the U.S.–Oman Free Trade Agreement, and the Peru–U.S. Trade Promotion Agreement. The authority expired on July 1, 2007.

In October 2011, the Congress and President Obama enacted into law the Colombia Trade Promotion Agreement, the South Korea–U.S. Free Trade Agreement, and the Panama–U.S. Trade Promotion Agreement using fast track rules, all of which the George W. Bush administration signed before the deadline. By 2013, the majority of United States free trade agreements were implemented as congressional-executive agreements. Unlike treaties, such agreements only require a majority of the House and Senate to pass. Under the TPA, Congress authorizes the President to negotiate "free trade agreements ... if they are approved by both houses in a bill enacted into public law and other statutory conditions are met."

=== TPP and 2015 reauthorization ===
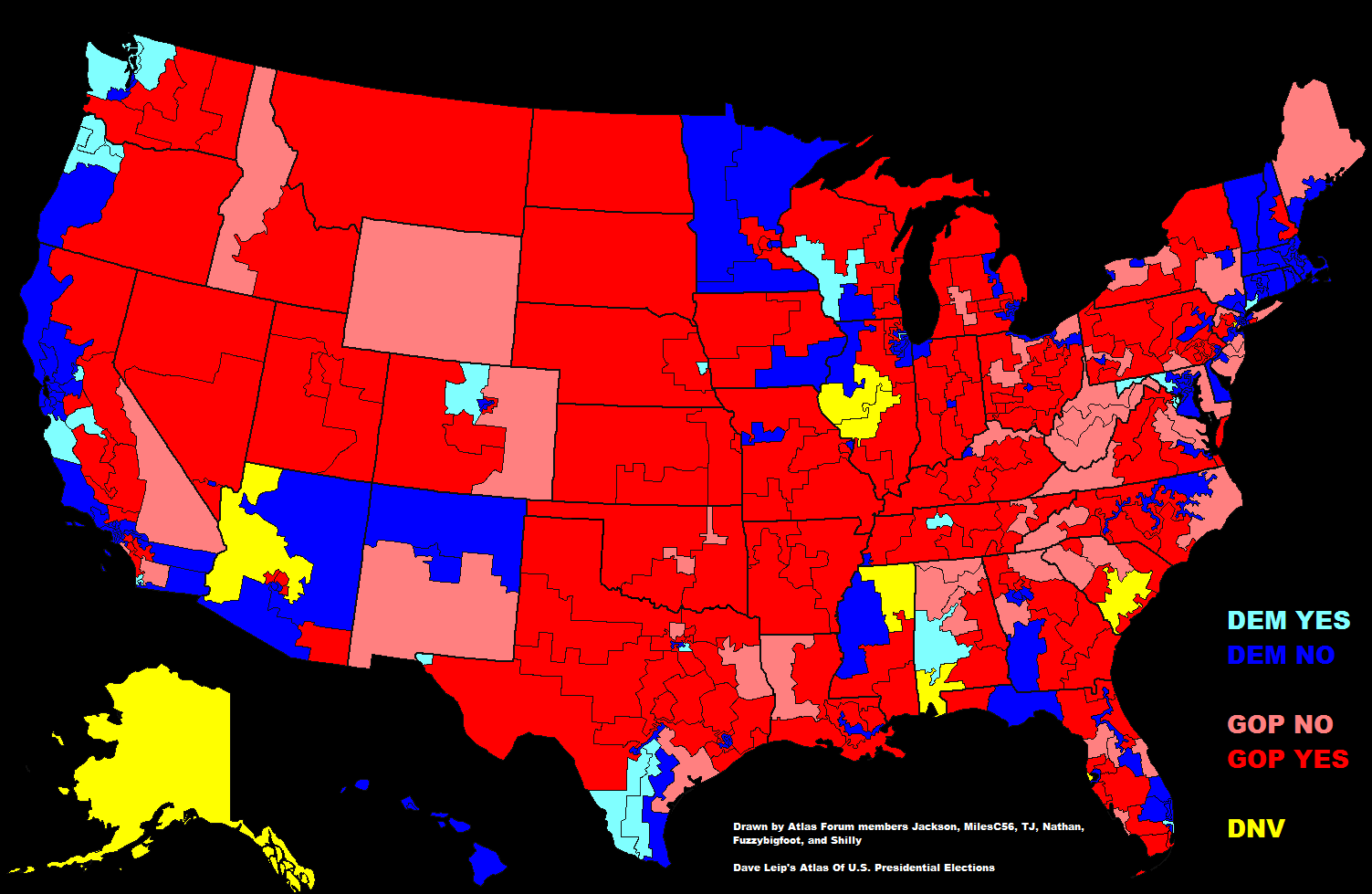
US House Vote on the Trade Promotion Authority Bill, 18 June 2015

In early 2012, the Obama administration indicated that renewal of the authority was a requirement for the conclusion of Trans-Pacific Partnership (TPP) negotiations, which had been undertaken as if the authority were still in effect. In December 2013, 151 House Democrats signed a letter written by Rosa DeLauro (D-CT) and George Miller (D-CA), which opposed the fast track trade promotion authority for the TPP. Several House Republicans opposed the measure on the grounds that it empowered the executive branch. In January 2014, House Democrats refused to put forward a co-sponsor for the legislation, hampering the bill's prospects for passage. On 16 April 2015, several U.S. Senators introduced "The Bipartisan Congressional Trade Priorities and Accountability Act of 2015", which is commonly known as TPA Fast-track legislation. The bill passed the Senate on 21 May 2015, by a vote of 62 to 38, with 31 Democrats, five Republicans and both Independents opposing. The bill went to the U.S. House of Representatives, which narrowly passed the bill 218–208, and also removed the Trade Adjustment Assistance portions of the Senate bill. The TPA was passed by the Senate on 24 June 2015, without the TAA provisions, requiring only the signature of the President before becoming law. President Obama expressed a desire to sign the TPA and TAA together, and did sign both into law on 29 June, as the TAA was able to make its way through Congress in a separate bill. The TPA law was known as the Bipartisan Congressional Trade Priorities and Accountability Act of 2015, and the TAA law was known as the Trade Preferences Extension Act of 2015.

The ultimate approval of this legislation conferred on the Obama administration "enhanced power to negotiate major trade agreements with Asia and Europe." Through the TPA, Obama could "submit trade deals to Congress for an expedited vote without amendments." The successful conclusion of these bilateral talks was necessary before the other ten TPP members could complete the trade deal.

In 2021, the TPA expired once again and was not renewed.

== Political views on the TPA ==
=== Arguments in favor ===
According to AT&T executive chairman Randall L. Stephenson, the TPA was "critical to completing new trade agreements that have the potential to unleash U.S. economic growth and investment". Jason Furman, who was chairman of Obama's Council of Economic Advisers, also said "the United States might become less competitive globally if it disengaged from seeking further trade openings: 'If you're not in an agreement—that trade will be diverted from us to someone else—we will lose out to another country'". According to I.M. Destler of the Peterson Institute for International Economics, fast track "has effectively bridged the division of power between the two branches. It gives executive branch (USTR) negotiators needed credibility to conclude trade agreements by assuring other nations' representatives that Congress won't rework them; it guarantees a major Congressional role in trade policy while reducing members' vulnerability to special interests”. Additionally, according to President Reagan's Attorney General Edwin Meese III, "it is extremely difficult for any U.S. President to negotiate significant trade deals if he cannot assure other nations that Congress will refrain from adding numerous amendments and conditions that must then be taken back to the negotiating table". The very nature of Trade Promotion Authority requires Congress to vote on the agreements before they can take effect, meaning that without TPA, "those agreements might never even be negotiated".

=== Arguments against ===
Groups opposed to Trade Promotion Authority claimed that it placed too much power in the executive branch, "allowing the president to unilaterally select partner countries for ‘trade’ pacts, decide the agreements' contents, and then negotiate and sign the agreements—all before Congress has a vote on the matter. Normal congressional committee processes were forbidden, meaning that the executive branch is empowered to write lengthy legislation on its own with no review or amendments." Article II, Section 2. He (the President) shall have Power, by and with the Advice and Consent of the Senate, to make Treaties, provided two thirds of the Senators present concur... Democratic members of Congress and general right-to-know internet groups were among those opposed to trade fast track on grounds of a lack of transparency. Such Congressional members had complained that fast track forced "members to jump over hurdles to see negotiation texts and blocks staffer involvement. In 2012, Senator Ron Wyden (D-Ore.) complained that corporate lobbyists were given easy access while his office was being stymied, and even introduced protest legislation requiring more congressional input."
