= Wayne Bush =

American diplomat

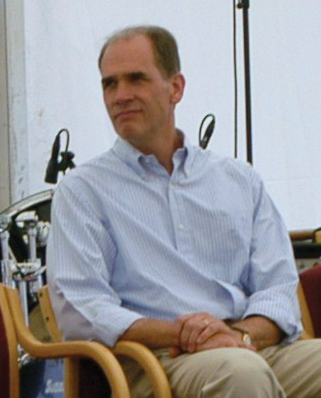
Wayne Bush in 2009

Wayne J. Bush is an American diplomat who was Assistant Secretary General for Executive Management at NATO in 2013.

Prior to working as the Assistant Secretary General at NATO, he was Director of the NATO Office of Resources from 2009 to 2013 facilitating decision-making by NATO's 28 member states on matters related to NATO Military Common Funding.

While working for the United States Foreign Service (rank of Minister-Counselor), Bush was Chargé d’Affaires of the U.S. Embassy in Belgium from January to October 2009 and Deputy Chief of Mission in Belgium from 2007 to 2009.

During his career with the United States Foreign Service, Bush served in Africa and Europe, and spent several terms in Washington DC. While in DC his responsibilities took him to the Middle East and to the former Soviet Union.

== Career ==
Bush graduated in 1981 from the University of Oregon School of Journalism.

From 1997 to 2000, he served at the U.S. Embassy in Paris, coordinating an initiative to establish five prototype U.S. Foreign Service posts in France. He served as Deputy Chief of Mission in Kampala, Uganda from 1994 to 1997. While assigned to Nairobi, Kenya, from 1991 to 1994, Mr. Bush helped establish a U.S. Liaison Office in Somalia to facilitate famine relief efforts.

From 2000 to 2003, Mr. Bush served in senior management roles in the State Department. He led State Department management contingency planning related to Iraq, served as Executive Assistant to the Under Secretary for Management, and directed the U.S. interagency management support program for diplomatic and consular posts world-wide.

From 2003 to 2007, Mr. Bush served as Deputy Chief of Mission at the U.S. Embassy in Rabat, Morocco, where among other activities, he facilitated the negotiation and implementation of the U.S.-Morocco Free Trade Agreement, an early important step towards the US Middle East Free Trade Area Initiative (MEFTA).

As a member of the United States Foreign Service with the rank of Minister-Counselor, Mr. Bush served as Chargé d’Affaires of the U.S. Embassy in Belgium from January to October 2009 and as Deputy Chief of Mission in Belgium from 2007 to 2009.

Bush's other Foreign Service assignments include Victoria, Seychelles; the Bureau of European and Canadian Affairs and the Operations Center in the Department of State; and, the U.S. Embassy in Kingston, Jamaica.

He has received the Presidential Meritorious Service Award; the Superior Honor Award; the Meritorious Honor Award; the State Department's Replogle Award for Management Improvement; and a Group Award for Valor.

He is married to Anna-Marie Saunders Bush; they have two children.
