= OFTA =

OFTA may refer to:

- Office of the Telecommunications Authority, part of the Telecommunications Authority in Hong Kong, dissolved in 2012
- Oman–United States Free Trade Agreement, trade agreement signed in 2006
- Online Film & Television Association, recognizing achievements in entertainment
