= CSKFTA =

CSKFTA or CKFTA can refer to:

- Canada–South Korea Free Trade Agreement (also known as the Canada–Korea Free Trade Agreement)
- China–South Korea Free Trade Agreement (also known as the China–Korea Free Trade Agreement)
