= Industrial design law of Oman =

Industrial design law in Oman is governed by the Industrial Property Law issued by Royal Decree No 67/2008 which was later amended by Royal Decree No 131/2008.

== History of Design Law in Oman ==
The first design related law was issued in 2000 as part of the process of Oman's accession to the World Trade Organization (WTO). This law was later repealed by the current comprehensive Industrial Property Law issued in 2008 as part of Oman's prerequisites for the entry into force of the Free Trade Agreement signed with the United States.

== Industrial Design Protection ==
=== Definition of Industrial Design ===
Article 1 of the Industrial Property Law states that an industrial design is any formation of lines, colors, or 3D shapes, whether connected by lines and colors or not, that adds a unique look to an industrial or handicraft good and may be recognized by the naked eye.

=== Requirement for Registration ===
In order for a design to be protected such a design must:

- Be novel in the sense that it has not been disclosed the public prior to the date of the application for registration.
- Have an individual character that distinguishes the design to a sufficient degree from all designs disclosed the public anywhere in the world.

=== Exemptions from Protection ===
The Omani Industrial Property Law does not allow for the protection of the following:

- Any aspect of the design which is solely dictated by a technical character.
- Designs which are contrary to public order and morals.

=== Duration of the Protection ===
The law grants the owner of the design a protection that initially lasts for 5 years, which can be renewed for up to a maximum of 15 years.

=== Rights of a Registered Design Owner ===
The owner of a registered design has the right to stop others from manufacturing, selling, or importing, goods that include or portray a design that is copied in part of whole from the registered design. This right is only related to commercial uses and does not cover non-commercial uses of the design.
