= China–Costa Rica Free Trade Agreement =

2011 trade pact between China and Costa Rica

The China-Costa Rica Free Trade Agreement is a bilateral free trade agreement signed between China and Costa Rica in 2010 August 1, 2011.

Among the issues addressed are the use of geographical indications.
