= U.S.–Middle East Free Trade Area =

Bush-era tariff agreement proposal

The U.S.–MEFTA initiative started in 2003 with the purpose of creating a U.S.–Middle East Free Trade Area by 2013.

The U.S. objective with this initiative has been to gradually increase trade and investment in the Middle East, and to assist the Middle East countries in implementing domestic reforms, instituting the rule of law, protecting private property rights (including intellectual property), and creating a foundation for openness, economic growth, and prosperity.

Among the stated objectives are:

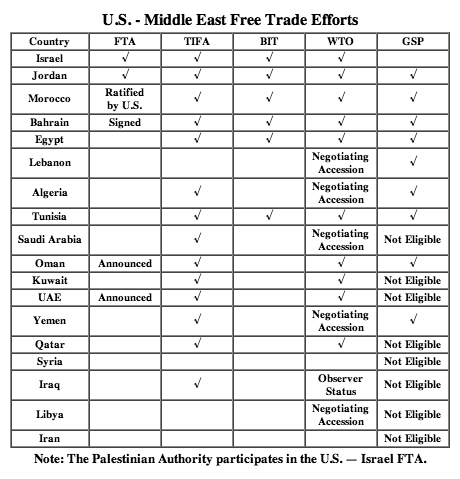
Screenshot from official US–MEFTA website, 15-11-2004

- Actively supporting WTO membership of countries in the Middle East and Maghreb
- Expanding the Generalized System of Preferences that currently provides duty-free entry to the U.S. market for some 3,500 products from 140 developing economies
- Negotiating Trade and Investment Framework Agreements that establish a framework for expanding trade and resolving outstanding disputes
- Negotiating bilateral investment treaties with interested countries by obligating governments to treat foreign investors fairly and offering legal protection equal to domestic investors
- Negotiating comprehensive free trade agreements with willing countries that demonstrate a commitment to economic openness and reform
- Helping to target more than $1 billion of annual U.S. funding and spur partnerships with private organizations and businesses that support trade and development

U.S.–Middle East Free Trade Efforts
Country	FTA	TIFA	BIT	WTO	GSP
Israel	Yes	Yes	Yes	Yes	
Jordan	Yes	Yes	Yes	Yes	Yes
Morocco	Yes	Yes	Yes	Yes	Yes
Bahrain	Yes	Yes	Yes	Yes	Yes
Egypt		Yes	Yes	Yes	Yes
Lebanon				Negotiating; Accession	Yes
Algeria		Yes		Negotiating; Accession	Yes
Tunisia		Yes	Yes	Yes	Yes
Saudi Arabia		Yes		Yes	Not Eligible
Oman	Yes	Yes		Yes	Yes
Kuwait		Yes		Yes	Not Eligible
UAE	Announced	Yes		Yes	Not Eligible
Yemen		Yes		Negotiating; Accession	Yes
Qatar		Yes		Yes	Not Eligible
Syria					Not Eligible
Iraq		Yes		Observer Status	Not Eligible
Libya				Negotiating; Accession	Not Eligible
Iran					Not Eligible
Note: The Palestinian Authority participates in the U.S.–Israel FTA.

== Active agreements ==
=== US agreements ===
The United States currently has several bilateral free trade agreements with nations in the region.

- Bahrain Bahrain–United States Free Trade Agreement
- Jordan Jordan–United States Free Trade Agreement
- Morocco Morocco–United States Free Trade Agreement
- Oman Oman–United States Free Trade Agreement
- Israel Israel-United States Free Trade Agreement

=== Middle Eastern agreements ===
Additionally many potential MEFTA states are already members of the multilateral Greater Arab Free Trade Area.

- Algeria
- Bahrain
- Egypt
- Iraq
- Jordan
- Kuwait
- Lebanon
- Libya
- Morocco
- Oman
- Palestine
- Qatar
- Saudi Arabia
- Sudan
- Syria
- Tunisia
- United Arab Emirates
- Yemen

Other states are members of the multilateral Arab Maghreb Union.

- Algeria
- Libya
- Mauritania
- Morocco
- Tunisia

The following, expected to constitute MEFTA, are not members of existing Middle Eastern agreements:

- Cyprus
- Iran

== See also ==
- Greater Middle East
- Middle East Partnership Initiative
- Lists of free trade agreements
- List of trade blocs
- Middle East economic integration
