= Middle East Partnership Initiative =

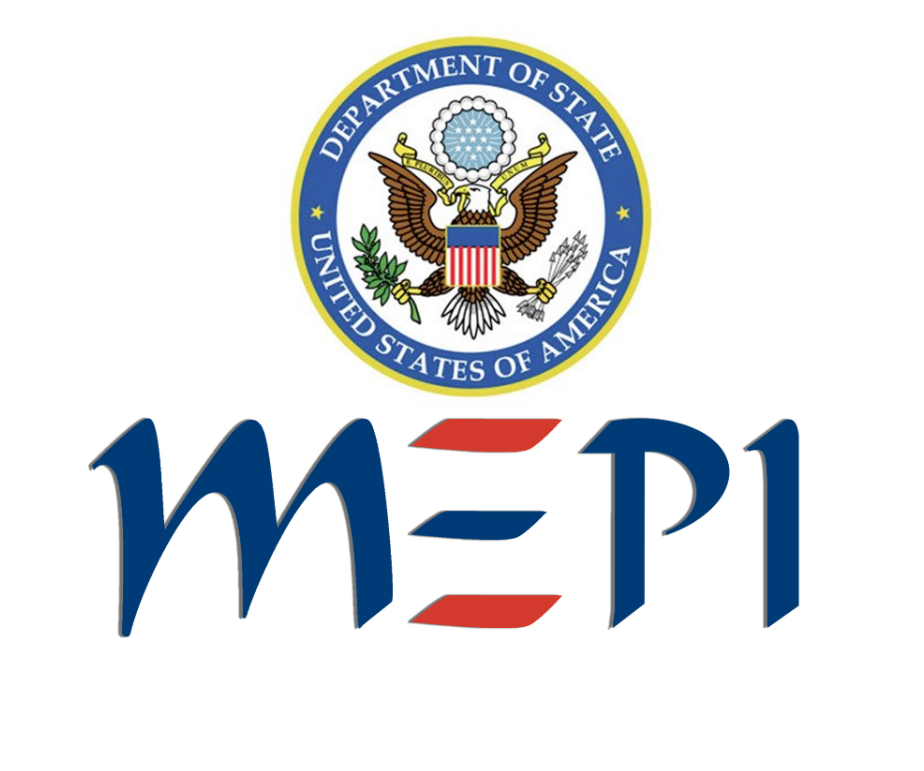
Logo

The Middle East Partnership Initiative (MEPI) is a United States State Department program that fosters meaningful and effective partnerships between citizens, civil society, the private sector, and governments in the Middle East and North Africa (MENA) region to resolve local challenges and promote shared interests in the areas of participatory governance and economic opportunity and reform.

Focusing on promoting stability and prosperity in the region, MEPI supports partnerships through projects that are responsive to emerging opportunities by being field-driven, applying evidence-based decision-making, and designing results-oriented projects.

Four of MEPI's most prominent leadership programs are its annual Student Leaders program that brings students from all over the MENA region to participate in an intensive leadership training course of approximately 5 weeks in the United States, its Leaders for Democracy Fellowship program that provides early and mid-career professionals from the MENA region with the opportunity to complete training in participatory governance, conflict resolution, and political mobilization and communication, and its Tomorrow's Leaders undergraduate and graduate program which provides scholarships to promising, under-served students from the MENA region through accredited regional institutions.

== Assistance objectives ==
=== Participatory governance ===
MEPI advances participatory governance in viewing citizens' role as direct deliberative engagement with decision-makers and processes. Broader citizen participation in governance ensures inclusive decision-making and transparent political processes, promotes stability and enhances citizen confidence in government. MEPI empowers citizens to engage with governments in shaping their demands for services and opportunities on the local, regional, and national levels. MEPI bolsters civil society to effectively interact with government officials to increase their responsiveness to citizen needs and with citizens to channel their participation in decision-making. MEPI supports government officials' efforts to increase their engagement with and responsiveness to citizens to resolve issues of shared concern.

1. Increase citizens' civic engagement to foster partnership and mutually beneficial dialogue with civil society and public officials.
2. Strengthen individuals, including youth, with knowledge and skills to advocate for their interests at all levels of government.
3. Utilize MEPI leadership training programs to provide economically disadvantaged individuals the opportunities to build their leadership skills to effectively engage with civil society, the private sector, or government actors.
4. Professionalize civil society organizations and build their organizational and communication capacity to connect effectively with decision makers or citizens.
5. Strengthen civil society's ability to act as a credible mediator between governments and citizens, and channel citizens' concerns in an effective manner.
6. Enhance governments' efforts to be representative of, responsive to, and trusted by their citizens.
7. Support governments' efforts to increase their transparency, access, and accountability.
8. Increase women's representation in government institutions, and promote their civic and political participation.

=== Economic opportunity ===
Economic opportunity and reforms are cornerstones for fostering partnership between citizens, civil society, the private sector, and governments. MEPI partners with the U.S. private sector in areas of mutual interest to promote business enabling environments, entrepreneurship, and a skilled labor force to help cultivate broad-based opportunities.

1. Improve business-enabling environments through economic reform, especially in higher-income and non-traditional development countries. 2.2. Support governments’ efforts to increasing financial transparency and implement economic reforms.
2. Improve government policies and procedures that expand opportunities for entrepreneurs and small and medium enterprises for economic growth and job creation.
3. Bolster social entrepreneurship initiatives that develop, fund, and implement solutions to social issues, and facilitate their collaboration with citizens, civil society and governments.
4. Partner with investors, entrepreneurs, and consumers to create institutions, and craft regulations that encourage broad-based economic growth.
5. Increase workforce employability and skill level, and improve citizens', including youth, access to higher value opportunities through demand-driven vocational training and targeted, localized job placement, primarily in the private sector.
6. Promote economic growth through increasing women's participation in economic activities and reducing the gender income and employment gap. In addition to these core objectives, MEPI’s Tomorrow's Leaders program prepares future community and business leaders in the MENA region. The Congressionally-directed program supports scholarships for underserved and qualified students at select U.S.-accredited universities and emphasizes a strong civic engagement component.

== History ==
U.S. Secretary of State Colin Powell, serving under President George W. Bush, announced the creation of MEPI in a December 2002 speech at The Heritage Foundation in Washington, D.C., declaring that the goal of MEPI was to create "a long-term prospect" for reform, "not something that is going to be done in one year or five years.". MEPI was designed to target areas not served by USAID, the United States' main foreign aid and development program. Initially dependent on USAID in support of its mission, MEPI has come into its own and targets short-term programs addressing political change in order for USAID longer-term development programs to be successful.

In 2002, Elizabeth Cheney and daughter of Vice-President Dick Cheney, was appointed U.S. Deputy Assistant Secretary for Near Eastern Affairs and tasked with supervising MEPI. Cheney explained that under MEPI, the US administration funded programs as diverse as training Arab journalists to revising current teaching methods from rote learning to more child-oriented teaching methods. Additionally, MEPI supported countries seeking to sign Free Trade Agreements with the United States to meet President Bush’s goal to establish a joint Middle East Free Trade zone by 2013.

In March 2003, William J. Burns, Assistant Secretary, Bureau of Near Eastern Affairs, U.S. Department of State, and Wendy Chamberlin, Assistant Administrator for Asia and the Near East, U.S. Agency for International Development, testified before the House Subcommittee on the Middle East and Central Asia on the operational aspects of MEPI and how they reflected U.S. policy of the war on terrorism. Rep. Steve Chabot, R- OH and Rep. William Janklow, R-SD, questioned how reforms would be enacted to deal with textbooks that taught Arab children "anti-Jewish sentiment" and "racist" hatred. Burns responded that "detoxification" would be encouraged by MEPI, particularly in the Palestinian school system. Chamberlin stated that USAID would attempt to address this through teacher training programs. A February 2, 2010, article in the Jerusalem Post reported that a UK watchdog group, The Taxpayer's Alliance, has tracked European taxpayer-funded aid to the Palestinians. In recently released reports, the Alliance found that anti-Semitic and anti-Israel narratives continue to persist in Palestinian textbooks in violation of the 1994 Oslo Accords.

In a November 2003 speech given at the National Endowment for Democracy, also known as the NED, President Bush stressed the need to spread democracy to the Arab and Muslim-majority countries of the Middle East to address the deficits of freedom. Carl Gershman, president of the NED, in his remarks delivered at the December 12, 2003, Conference on Mideast Regional Security V, reinforced President Bush's words with his own, "By any category that is meaningful in the world today, there is only one set of countries that is completely undemocratic: the Arab world." Mr. Gershman stated further that "democracy will not come about if people dwell on the past or are obsessed with blame-placing, but only if they seek practical solutions to real problems. If this is true, it follows that a change in political culture – replacing attitudes of victimization with a readiness to engage in self-criticism and to take responsibility for one's own fate – can only come from within the Arab world." MEPI's original mandate was to address four deficits in the Arab world identified by the 2002 Arab Human Development Report—deficits in political freedom, economic freedom, knowledge, and women's rights. In that same U.N. report, Arab scholars wrote that a choice had to be made between "inertia…[and] an Arab renaissance that will build a prosperous future for all Arabs."

== Organization ==
MEPI is located within the Bureau of Near Eastern Affairs in the U.S. State Department. In addition to its headquarters in Washington, D.C., MEPI has regional offices in the MENA region.

== Public diplomacy ==
Soft power, a phrase coined by political theorist and author, Joseph S. Nye Jr., is used as a complement to America's military strength, or hard power, in a post 9-11 world. Nye believes that by incorporating soft power in U.S. national strategy, America is able to utilize "the ability to get what you want through attraction rather than coercion or payments. It arises from the attractiveness of a country's culture, political ideals, and policies. When our policies are seen as legitimate in the eyes of others, our soft power is enhanced.".

In a June 2007 article for The Stanley Foundation, Francis Fukuyama and Michael McFaul endorsed American soft power as a means to implement democracy in foreign policy, "The war in Iraq has fostered the false impression that military force is the only instrument of regime change, when in fact it is the rarest used and least effective way to promote democratic change abroad. A wiser, more effective, and more sustainable strategy must emphasize nonmilitary tools aimed at changing the balance of power between democratic forces and autocratic rulers and, only after there has been progress toward democracy, building liberal institutions."

== Critics ==
Critics have charged that MEPI hinders reform by working too closely within the limitations set by the Arab governments in the regions it serves. MEPI has addressed these concerns through its small grants programs shifting away from Arab government agencies to work directly with civil society activists.

MEPI critics in the Arab world saw the initiative as the U.S. means to impose reforms on the Middle East following 9-11 and complained that the Israeli occupation of the Palestinian Arab territories and the U.S. occupation in Iraq needed to be resolved before reforms could be introduced. Liz Cheney refuted those critics by stating that the U.S. administration believed without reform, the region would continue to generate "ideologies of hate and violence." Cheney believed that reforms as well as resolutions to regional issues could occur concurrently. Economic and political reforms would influence the future of the Middle East. Cheney offered that court systems needed to be reformed in order to instill investor confidence in the region.

Although there is increasing debate over the need for Arab countries to reform politically and economically, most of these Arab countries are suspicious when such reform is called for by the U.S. government. Thomas Carothers, an authority on democracy promotion at the Carnegie Endowment for International Peace, suggested in February 2005, that MEPI should be reestablished as the Middle East Foundation (MEF), a private foundation that would be eligible for funding in a line-item grant in the foreign affairs account of the federal budget. If freed from the constraints of an aid program affiliated with the State Department, Carothers argued, such a foundation would enjoy the autonomy necessary to develop political reform projects that would be viewed as separate from the U.S. government. Moreover, it would be more likely that MEPI would increase the possibility of attracting funding from sources outside the U.S. government.

== See also ==
- Greater Middle East
- U.S.–Middle East Free Trade Area
