= Canada–Israel Free Trade Agreement =

The Canada–Israel Free Trade Agreement (CIFTA) is a free trade agreement between Canada and Israel.

== History ==
It was signed on July 31, 1996, and came into effect on January 1, 1997. It was Canada's first free trade agreement outside of the Western Hemisphere. 80% Tariffs on most manufactured and agricultural goods were eliminated. However, CIFTA does not affect certain agriculture sectors like poultry, dairy and eggs.

CIFTA was amended in 2002, 2003 and 2015. On May 27, 2019, Bill C-85 went before parliament to amend CIFTA and received royal assent. This most recent amendment was in force from September 1, 2019. The first amendment allows certain products like textiles to undergo some levels of processing in the United States without losing their status while in transit. The second amendment further reduced agricultural tariffs.

CIFTA's main goals include:

- The elimination of trade barriers and tariffs
- Promotion of fair competition
- The increase of investments between the two nations

While Israel is not one of Canada's major trading partners, the Canadian government sought to put Canadian businesses on the same footing as US businesses, who were benefiting from the US-Israel Free Trade Agreement. Bilateral trade increased to $1.24 billion by 2005.

== History of trade balances ==
Trade Type	2010	2011	2012	2013	2014
Total Canadian Exports	385,007	399,878	265,631	379,773	449,875
Total Canadian Imports	1,006,448	982,437	1,144,827	1,059,010	1,107,296
Trade Balance	-621,441	-582,559	-879,197	-679,237	-657,420

Amounts in thousands of Canadian dollars ($CDN).

== Exploratory discussions for the modernization ==
There are a number of ongoing discussions for the modernization of the agreement.
