= Indonesia–European Union trade relations =

Diplomatic relations between the Republic of Indonesia and European Union trade

The European Union and Indonesia have built robust commercial relations, with bilateral trade amounting to approximately €25 billion in 2012 resulting in a sizeable €5.7 billion trade surplus for Indonesia with the EU. As of 2012, EU and Indonesia trade has been marked by an upward trend. Whereas total trade was worth almost €16 billion in 2009, by 2011 it had already reached €23.5 billion.

As of 2024, bilateral trade in goods between the European Union and Indonesia reached approximately €27.3 billion, with EU exports valued at €9.7 billion and imports at €17.5 billion, indicating a continued expansion in trade relations.

For the EU, Indonesia is the 24th largest import source (share 0.9%) and the 30th largest export destination (share 0.6%). Inside the ASEAN region, Indonesia ranks fourth in terms of total trade.

By 2024, Indonesia had become the European Union’s 33rd largest trading partner globally and its fifth-largest trading partner within the ASEAN region. The EU accounted for around 6.4% of Indonesia’s total trade.

The EU is Indonesia's 4th largest trading partner after Japan, China and Singapore, representing almost 10% of its total external trade. The EU is the second-largest investor in the Indonesian economy. In the past years, approximately 1000 European companies have invested about €130 billion in the economy and directly generated employment for 1.1 million Indonesians. EU investment in Indonesia is mostly allocated to mining, infrastructure and manufacturing.

== Trade in figures ==
Despite the positive trend, the EU's share of Indonesia's trade with main partners diminished, from 9.2% in 2010 to 8.7% in 2011 and to 8,1% in 2012. Even at a record high of EUR 25 billion, overall Indonesia–EU bilateral trade is well below some of the other neighbours in the region, even though Indonesia is the largest economy in ASEAN. Trade value between Singapore and EU is recorded at US$52 billion, while trade value between Malaysia and Thailand with the EU is recorded at US$35 billion and US$32 billion, respectively.

The share of Indonesia's exports shipped to the European market has declined considerably, from 18 per cent to 14 per cent over the last decade. Most of the decline in Indonesia's exports to Europe's markets has been redirected to the ASEAN regional market.

The EU is Indonesia's second-largest source of FDI, however, during the period 2004–2010, Indonesia received only 1.6% of all EU FDI going into Asia, and only 6% of all EU investments flowing into the ASEAN region.

Indonesia mostly exports to the EU agricultural products and processed resources, mainly palm oil, fuels and mining products, textiles and furniture. EU exports to Indonesia consist mainly of high-tech machinery and transport equipment, chemicals and various manufactured goods. Essentially, trade flows between Indonesia and the EU complement each other.

== Trade in timber ==
Wood and paper products are a key export area for Indonesia, with the total average annual value of timber and paper exports from Indonesia reaching US$1.2 billion, which is around 15% of Indonesia's exports. The main timber products destined for the EU are paper, paper board, wooden furniture and plywood. Indonesia has suffered from severe illegal logging and rapid deforestation since the 1990s, and steps have been taken to strengthen control against the import of illegal timber products from Indonesia.

After six years of intensive negotiations, Indonesian Forestry Minister Zulkifli Hasan, European Commissioner for the Environment Janez Potočnik and the Lithuanian Minister of Environment Valentinas Mazuronis signed the Indonesia–European Union (EU) Voluntary Partnership Agreement on Forest Law Enforcement Governance and Trade (FLEGT–VPA) in October 2013. This was hailed as an important milestone in Indonesia–EU trade relations. The FLEGT-VPA aims to prevent the trade of illegal timber and ensure that only verified legal timber and timber products are imported to the EU from Indonesia.

Having signed the agreement, Indonesia and the EU will proceed to the ratification phase of the agreement through their respective processes. Eventually, this will lead to the implementation of the FLEGT-VPA, which will take place when both sides assess the licensing is ready.

== Trade in palm oil ==
According to the EU statistics (Eurostat) Indonesia's exports of crude palm oil (CPO) have been surging over the last five years from €265 million in 2008 to €1.1 billion in 2012. The EU is Indonesia's second-largest palm oil market after India. Indonesia's exports of biodiesel have also increased sharply, from only €116 million in 2008 to €993 million in 2012.

Given that there are concerns in Indonesia on the impact of EU's environmental regulations, there is a strong dialogue on the issue. An anti-dumping investigation was initiated in August 2012 as there was evidence of dumping by companies from both Indonesia and Argentina of biodiesel on the EU market. Provisional measures were imposed in May 2013. As of 27 November 2013 the EU will impose definitive anti-dumping duties on imports of biodiesel from Indonesia.

== Free Trade Agreement/CEPA ==
In December 2009, the EU decided to pursue negotiations towards free trade agreements with individual ASEAN countries, beginning with Singapore and followed by Malaysia and Vietnam. Indonesia and the European Union (EU) have agreed to commence talks on a Comprehensive Economic Partnership Agreement (CEPA) as both parties seek to enhance two-way trade and the EU's investments in Indonesia.

The decision was informed by the Indonesia–EU Vision Group, established in late 2009 based on an initiative from Indonesian President Susilo Bambang Yudhoyono and European Commission President Jose Manuel Barroso, calling for the early launch of talks for a Comprehensive Economic Partnership Agreement (CEPA). Besides a FTA, CEPA also envisages capacity-building and trade facilitation. Negotiations started in July 2016, and the 9th round of talks is scheduled for early December 2019.

In July 2025 a senior Indonesian official said the country was speeding up the talks as a hedge against United States tariffs. Negotiations on the agreement were concluded in Bali on 23 September 2025. On 29 June 2026 the European Commission sent the CEPA and a separate Investment Protection Agreement to the Council of the European Union for signature and conclusion. Both agreements also need the consent of the European Parliament before they can enter into force.

== Trade facilitation ==
Indonesia currently enjoys trade preferences with the EU under the generalized scheme of preferences which grants product imports into the European Union either duty-free access or tariff reductions. At present, almost 40 per cent of Indonesia's 13 billion Euros exports to the EU market are eligible for preferential treatment.

The EU also carries out a number of projects aimed at improving bilateral trade. The Trade Support Programme, for instance focuses on technical elements affecting the Indonesia–EU trade flows: Capacity building in WTO for Indonesian officials, harmonisation of EU Standards, improving of technical laboratories.

There is also a yearly business-to-business forum with the goal of increasing trade and investment between Indonesia and the EU. The EU–Indonesia Business Dialogue (EIBD) started in 2009 and since then, inputs and recommendations developed by EIBD have helped to improve the climate for doing business between Indonesia and the EU. Sector regulations have been eased, enabling market access on both sides. The overall objective is to facilitate open dialogue between Indonesian and European business communities.
