= Indonesia–Japan Economic Partnership Agreement =

- Type: Trade agreement
- Effective: 2008; 18 years ago
- Parties: Indonesia; Japan

The Indonesia–Japan Economic Partnership Agreement is a bilateral agreement signed between Indonesia and Japan on 20 August 2007 and having been in force since 1 July 2008. Initiated by Japanese Prime Minister Junichiro Koizumi, it was Indonesia's first bilateral free trade agreement. Since 2013, Indonesia has requested a review of the terms of the agreement, and negotiations are currently underway.

== Agreements ==
The agreement contained clauses related to free trade of goods and services between the two countries through the removal of tariffs, while adjusting investment regulations to attract Japanese investors to Indonesia. It also covered specific topics such as intellectual property, customs procedures, and energy/mineral resources. The agreement also allowed some Indonesian nurses to work in Japan.

== History ==
A trade agreement between Japan and Southeast Asian countries (including Indonesia) had been floated as an idea by then Japanese Prime Minister Junichiro Koizumi during his visit to Jakarta in January 2002, when he briefed Indonesian President Megawati Sukarnoputri. Further talks were conducted between the two when Megawati visited Tokyo in June 2003. Following a brief interruption due to the 2004 Indonesian presidential election which saw Megawati's replacement with Susilo Bambang Yudhoyono, the agreement's progress continued in December 2004 when both countries agreed to form a "study group" to explore a potential free trade agreement. Findings of the study group were published in May 2005, and it recommended negotiations to be conducted in parallel with the agreement between Japan and the ASEAN.

A joint communique following a meeting by Yudhoyono and Koizumi on 2 June 2005 announced the initiation of negotiations. By November 2006, both governments announced that an agreement has been reached "in principle", though the seventh and final round of negotiations would only occur in June 2007. Japan's cabinet approved the terms of the bilateral agreement on 10 August, and the agreement was signed on 20 August 2007 in Jakarta. The treaty came into force on 1 July 2008. It was Indonesia's first bilateral free trade agreement.

=== Renegotiations ===
As part of the agreement, a general review is mandated within five years, and the Indonesian government called for one in 2013. Starting in 2015, both countries agreed to renegotiate the terms of the agreement, with the Indonesian side (under President Joko Widodo) intending for Japanese investors to increase investments in Indonesian infrastructure. Negotiations continued throughout 2018 and 2019, with an initial target of completing negotiations by the end of 2019. As of January 2020, negotiations still continued on a renewed agreement.
