= China–South Korea Free Trade Agreement =

The China–South Korea Free Trade Agreement (CSKFTA; also known as CKFTA - China–Korea Free Trade Agreement) is a free trade agreement between China and South Korea signed in 2014 and active since the following year.

== Background ==
By 2014, the People's Republic of China had become the largest trading partner of the Republic of Korea, the largest exporter, and the largest source of imports.

The Republic of Korea has become the People's Republic of China's largest importer and one of the most important sources of investment.

In 2013, bilateral trade volume between China and South Korea reached $274.2 billion.

China accounted for 24.8 percent of South Korea's total exports in 2018, according to the Korea International Trade Association (KITA).

== History ==
Negotiations on the agreement started in May 2012. By July 2014 there had been 12 rounds of talks.

On November 10, 2014, the Agreement was made official. South Korean president Park Geun-hye stated that her government would make efforts to enter the agreement into force as soon as possible.

On June 1, 2015, China and South Korea signed a free trade agreement, which went into force on December 20, 2015.

On August 3, 2020, the third joint committee of the China-Korea Free Trade Agreement was held through video conference. The Chinese delegation composed of the Ministry of Commerce, the Development and Reform Commission, the Ministry of Finance, the Ministry of Agriculture and Rural Affairs, the General Administration of Customs, the General Administration of Market Supervision, the Council for the Promotion of International Trade, Weihai City, Shandong Province, etc., and the Ministry of Industry, Trade and Energy, the Ministry of Finance and Economy, A Korean delegation composed of the Ministry of Agriculture, Food and Rural Affairs attended the meeting.

== Agreement scope ==
The China–South Korea Free Trade Agreement covers 17 areas of goods trade, service trade, investment and rules, including e-commerce, competition policy, government procurement, environment and other.

"21st century economic and trade issues." In terms of tariff concessions, after the China-Korea Free Trade Agreement is reached, after a transition period of up to 20 years, China's products with zero tariffs will reach 91% of the tax target and 85% of imports, and South Korea's products with zero tariff will To achieve 92% of the tax objective, 91% of the import value. In addition, a total of 310 items including products produced in North Korea's Kaesong Industrial Park have obtained the qualification of Korean origin, and can enjoy tariff preferences immediately after the entry into force of the China-Korea Free Trade Agreement.

In terms of market opening, China and South Korea will provide reciprocal treatment to each other's financial companies entering their own capital markets, which means that the relevant approval process will be simplified and the barriers to entry into the financial markets of both sides are expected to be lowered. The agreement also includes that Korean construction companies in the Shanghai Pilot Free Trade Zone can contract cooperative projects in Shanghai without being restricted by the proportion of foreign investment (foreign investment accounts for more than 50%). The Chinese side is considering allowing Korean travel agencies to recruit and visit South Korea in China.

In addition, China and South Korea also promised that after the signing of the agreement, they will continue to carry out service trade negotiations in the negative list model, and carry out investment negotiations based on the pre-access national treatment and the negative list model.

== Influence ==
Republic of Korea

After the China-Korea Free Trade Zone takes effect, 91 percent of Korea's exports to the People's Republic of China will be subject to tariff elimination in 20 years, amounting to 141.7 billion dollars.

Japan

Japan is less interested in China–South Korea Free Trade Agreement. One reason is the lackluster political ties between China and Japan, and the other is that Japan concentrates on the U.S.-led Trans-Pacific Strategic Economic Partnership.

Taiwan

The Chinese Kuomintang (KMT) believes that China–South Korea Free Trade Agreement poses a great threat to Taiwan's economy because of the overlapping of industries between Taiwan and the Republic of Korea.

Vice Minister of Economic Affairs Zhuo Shi Zhao quoted the report from the Chung-Ang Institute of Economic Research, saying, "With the implementation of the FTA, the export of industrial products (24.7 percent of the total value of industrial products) in Taiwan will be affected by high tariffs, particularly in the industries such as steel, machinery, automobiles, panels, petrochemicals, textiles, and glass."

The coming into effect of the China-Korea Free Trade Zone has raised concerns among the island's interior officials and large and medium-sized enterprises. In an interview with Chen Wen-si, Honghai Group Chairman Guo Taiming said: "I am an economic voter, and I am concerned about the marginalization of the Taiwan region as a whole of global liberalization and internationalization."

Chen Deok-Myung, president of the China Sea Association, said on December 10, 2014, that the mainland will open up its "financial and telecommunications" markets to the Republic of Korea two years later, and that China and South Korea will open up to each other 90 percent, the mainland will open to Taiwan 90 percent, and Taiwan should open to 60 percent.
