= United States–Thailand Free Trade Agreement =

Unfinished free trade agreement

President George W. Bush and Prime Minister Thaksin Shinawatra announced the intention to negotiate a US-Thailand free trade agreement on October 19, 2003, during President Bush's state visit to Thailand on the event of the APEC Leaders' meeting in Bangkok. Mr. Thaksin was deposed in the 2006 Thai coup d'état without having finished negotiating the agreement.

== See also ==
- Siamese-American Treaty of Amity and Commerce of 1833, proclaimed June 24, 1837, a free-trade agreement except for munitions of war and opium, or to export rice, but without reciprocity
- Reciprocity (international relations)
- Rules of Origin
- Market access
- Free-trade area
- Tariffs
