= Jordan–United States Free Trade Agreement =

FTA between US and Jordan

Agreement between the United States of America and the Hashemite Kingdom of Jordan on the Establishment of a Free Trade Area
United States–Jordan Free Trade Agreement (JOFTA) (American English); اتفاقية التجارة الحرة بين الولايات المتحدة الأمريكية والأردن (Arabic)
- Type: Free trade agreement
- Drafted: 24 October 2000
- Signed: 24 October 2000
- Location: Washington, D.C., United States
- Effective: 17 December 2001
- Condition: 2 months after notification of each state that all internal procedures have been completed
- Ratifiers: Jordan; United States
- Languages: English; Arabic

The United States–Jordan Free Trade Agreement is the first free trade agreement (FTA) between the United States and an Arab country (and the United States' fourth FTA overall behind Israel, Canada, and Mexico). It is Jordan's second free trade agreement, after the 1997 Greater Arab Free Trade Agreement. The agreement, which grants duty-free status to nearly all Jordanian exports to the United States, was signed on 24 October 2000 and went into force on 17 December 2001. Rules of origin require that goods be composed of a minimum of 35 percent Jordanian content to be eligible for duty-free entry.

As a result of the agreement, Jordan became a "magnet for apparel manufacturing," as American companies such as Walmart, Target and Hanes established factories so they could cut costs by eliminating tariffs. In 2019, U.S. exports to Jordan were $1.5 billion, while imports were $2.2 billion, about 80 percent of which were apparel and textile goods.

== Support in the United States ==
United States-Jordan Free Trade Area Implementation Act
- Long title: To implement the agreement establishing a United States-Jordan free trade area.
- Enacted by: the 107th United States Congress

Citations
- Public law: Pub. L. 107–43 (text) (PDF)

Legislative history
- Introduced in the House of Representatives as H.R. 2603 by Bill Thomas (R-CA) on July 24, 2001; Committee consideration by House Ways and Means and House Judiciary; Passed the House of Representatives on July 31, 2001 (Voice Vote); Passed the Senate on September 24, 2001 (Voice Vote); Signed into law by President George W. Bush on September 28, 2001

The U.S. House of Representatives ratified the FTA on 31 July 2001 and the U.S. Senate ratified it on 24 September 2001; both were by voice vote, an indication of its widespread support. President George W. Bush signed the United States–Jordan Free Trade Area Implementation Act into law on 28 September 2001. It went into effect on 17 December 2001, and was fully implemented on 1 January 2010.

=== Economic rationale ===
Unlike many trade agreements, the U.S.–Jordan Free Trade Agreement enjoyed widespread, bipartisan, and multisectoral support. Proponents pointed to the reduction of customs duties and other trade barriers as a boon for exports.

=== Political rationale ===
More importantly, the U.S. government looked to the political gains to make the FTA worthwhile; economic gains for U.S. businesses, if any, were expected to be small. Ideally, the "economic linkages" generated by the FTA would "normalize strained relationships and offer institutional mechanisms to resolve and prevent political disputes." This, in turn, would act as the "turning point in which hope begins to replace the despair on which violent extremists breed," as Assistant Secretary for the Bureau of Near Eastern Affairs William Burns put it. The assumption was that in the course of jointly controlling and valuating rules of origin, Jordanian and Israeli customs officers would engage in interpersonal interactions resulting in understanding if not friendship.

In other words, the U.S. government has adopted a neoliberal worldview that believes stronger economic relations will bring about peace and stability in the Middle East.

== Impact ==
Jordanian exports to the U.S., 1995-2010

=== Textile industry ===
Jordan became a "magnet for apparel manufacturing," as American companies such as Walmart, Target and Hanes established factories so they could cut costs by eliminating tariffs. In the FTA's first year, Jordan had increased exports by 213% and created 30,000 jobs. By 2002 Jordan enjoyed a marginal trade surplus with the United States.

Five years after the FTA came into effect, Jordanian exports to the United States had increased twentyfold; Jordan's apparel exports to the United States in 2005 amounted to $1.2 billion. Most of Jordan's exports to the United States come from one of 114 companies.

=== Labor conditions ===
In 2006, the National Labor Committee, an American non-governmental organization, released a series of reports on Jordanian sweatshops, whose conditions according to the NLC's executive director were "the worst:" 20-hour workdays, not being paid for months, and physical abuse. Most laborers are not Jordanians; they are contracted guest workers from countries such as Bangladesh, Sri Lanka and China who pay a lump sum of about $2,000 to $3,000 to get hired by a garment factory. However, some factories then confiscate their passports, subjecting them to de facto involuntary servitude bordering on human trafficking. Many members of Congress expressed concern, especially because the Jordan FTA was lauded as "historic and progressive" for including labor and environmental provisions "directly within the agreement as opposed to being in a side agreement".

== See also ==
- Rules of origin
- Market access
- Free trade area
- Tariff
