= Morocco–United States Free Trade Agreement =

The US-Morocco Free Trade Agreement (or Morocco FTA) is a bilateral trade agreement between the United States and Morocco. The agreement was signed on June 15, 2004, followed by U.S. President George W. Bush's signing of the USMFTA Implementation Act on August 17, 2004. The United States House of Representatives ratified the pact on July 22, 2004 by a 323–99 vote. The United States Senate passed the bill by unanimous consent on July 21, 2004. The Morocco FTA came into effect on January 1, 2006.

It was, as of 2011, one of nine free trade agreements entered into by the U.S. since 1985. The agreement is aimed at increasing trade and creating new investment opportunities between the two countries. In relation to the huge U.S. economy, the free trade agreement is expected to have a positive, but small overall effect on the U.S. The Office of the U.S. Trade Representative (USTR) has said that the agreement with Morocco is the "best market access package to date of any U.S. free trade agreement signed with a developing country." Passage of this bill strengthened Morocco – United States relations economically.

== Key economic trade facts ==
Morocco joins Israel and Jordan as the third nation state in North Africa/Middle East to sign a free trade agreement with the U.S. This agreement was a positive move towards President Bush's Middle East Free Trade Initiative set forth in May 2003.

As of 2005, in terms of U.S. dollars, Morocco was ranked 89th among U.S. trading importers and 79th among U.S. exporters. This translates to U.S. trade with Morocco at less than .1% of its total imports and exports. As of 2003, Morocco exported approximately 2.9% of its total exports to the U.S., while it imported approximately 4.1% of its total imports from the U.S.. These numbers show that U.S. trade with Morocco is almost nil when compared with Moroccan trade with the U.S. Therefore, the USMFTA will potentially have a much larger effect on the Moroccan government.

== Details of the agreement ==
The US - Middle East Free Trade Area (USMFTA) is expected to bring about new market access for U.S. consumer and industrial products; opportunities for farmers and ranchers; banks, insurance, securities; telecommunications; and e-commerce. The agreement also includes assurances for U.S. businesses in regards to corruption, intellectual property, trademarks, copyright, patents and trade secrets. In order to prevent exploitation by either party, there are also provisions regarding protection of the environment and workers rights. It also makes the legal framework in which disputes are to be settled more transparent to help reduce risk for U.S. businesses. Since the U.S., for the most part, has these mechanisms already in place, the bulk of the updating and reforming will be done by the Moroccan government. For example, just prior to the agreement (signed in 2004), a news release by the Office of the U.S. Trade Representative announced major revisions in Moroccan labor laws spurred by the proposed signing of the agreement.

The FTA does not include services or goods originated in the Western Sahara, due its status of non-self governing territory.

== Benefits of the USMFTA ==
U.S. companies that build production facilities in Morocco today will have an added advantage of exporting industrial products duty-free to Europe by way of the Moroccan-E.U. Association Agreement signed in 2000. In addition, once the EU's Euro-Mediterranean Free Trade Area (EMFTA) is complete in 2010, additional duty-free access will flow down to U.S. companies. This duty-free access to the European market is of commercial and financial interest to U.S. businesses.

As of November 2006, 92 U.S. companies, 12 franchises, 9 liaison offices, and 22 NGO's schools, and USAID contractors have opened for business in Morocco. Most of the companies are large ones such as 3M, BF Goodrich, American Express, Caterpillar, just to name a few.

The benefits to accrue to Moroccan government, business, and consumers by way of the USMFTA are access to a large and rich U.S. market. With an inflow of U.S. direct investment, they will be able to build up a much needed infrastructure. Also, expanding business with the U.S. "broadens and diversifies" the trade options for Morocco and opens up opportunities for technology transfer and "commercial know-how". Further, if U.S. companies decide to open plants in Morocco, this will create job opportunities and boost domestic employment.

While there has been a lot of favorable press about the USMFTA, not all consider it a sound agreement. Most notably, in Morocco, there has been concern regarding the reduction in tariffs for agricultural products and the increase in intellectual property and patent standards. The reduction of tariffs on agricultural products to zero threatens domestic farms and employment. With approximately 40–50% of the Moroccan workforce in agriculture, the fall-out of the USMFTA is of great concern. In addition, Moroccan pharmaceutical companies have voiced concerns over increased penalties for intellectual property and patent violations. The industry says these penalties could "undermine access to cheap medicines" for Moroccans.

== See more ==
- Rules of Origin
- Market access
- Free-trade area
- Tariffs
