= Israel–United States Free Trade Agreement =

1985 international trade pact

The United States–Israel States Free Trade Agreement (FTA) is a trade pact between the State of Israel and the United States of America established in 1985 to lower trade barriers in some goods. The agreement reduces rates of duty, and in some case eliminates all duties, on merchandise exported from Israel to the United States. The agreement also covers merchandise exported from the Gaza Strip and the West Bank.

The U.S.–Israel FTA was the first such free trade agreement entered into by the United States. It is the only FTA the United States has signed that does not include a chapter on intellectual property rights, which have become a staple of all subsequent U.S. trade treaties.

== History ==
Negotiations for the pact began January 1, 1984, and concluded February 1, 1985. The pact was signed on April 22, 1985. Implementing legislation was introduced into the U.S. Congress on April 29 by Rep. James C. Wright, Jr. (D–Texas). This legislation was approved by the U.S. House of Representatives on May 7 by a 422–0 vote, and by the U.S. Senate on May 23 by a voice vote. The pact was signed into law by President Ronald Reagan on June 11, and implemented on September 1.

On January 1, 1995, all products produced in Israel that were eligible for reduced duty under the agreement became duty-free.

== Israel-United States bilateral economic relationship ==
The FTA between Israel and the United States was signed to set an example to the rest of the world to move forward with trade liberalization. The United States goals were to create bilateral economic relations with Israel beyond military support, reduce Israel's dependence on U.S. assistance, and strengthen the Israeli economy. Israel’s goals of the FTA were to secure a large trading market outside of the Arab boycotting region due to political conflicts, build trade with higher income countries to reduce debt, and to strengthen ties between the United States beyond economic means.

Under the bilateral economic relationship, the United States is Israel’s largest trading partner and Israel is the United States's 24th largest trading partner. With an $8 billion U.S. goods trade deficit in 2014, the United States' total goods imported were $23 billion and total goods exported were $15 billion. The top United States-Israel imports and exports are precious stones/diamonds, machinery, pharmaceutical products, medical investments, and agriculture products. United States leading imports from Israel in 2014 were $9.4 billion in diamonds and $4.6 billion in pharmaceuticals. Machinery, electric machinery, and optic/medical instruments imports were all around $1.5 billion in 2014.
