= Oman–United States Free Trade Agreement =

Agreement between the Government of the United States of America and the Government of the Sultanate of Oman on the Establishment of a Free Trade Area
United States–Oman Free Trade Agreement (OFTA) (American English); اتفاقية التجارة الحرة بين الولايات المتحدة الأمريكية وسلطنة عمان (Arabic)
- Type: Free trade agreement
- Drafted: 19 January 2006
- Signed: 19 January 2006
- Location: Washington, D.C., United States
- Effective: 1 January 2009
- Condition: 2 months after notification of each state that all internal procedures have been completed
- Ratifiers: Oman; United States
- Languages: English; Arabic

United States-Oman Free Trade Agreement Implementation Act
- Long title: To implement the United States-Oman Free Trade Agreement.
- Enacted by: the 109th United States Congress

Citations
- Public law: Pub. L. 109–283 (text) (PDF)

Legislative history
- Introduced in the House of Representatives as H.R. 5684 by John Boehner (R-OH) on June 26, 2006; Committee consideration by House Ways and Means; Passed the House of Representatives on July 20, 2006 (221-205); Passed the Senate on September 19, 2006 (62-32); Signed into law by President George W. Bush on September 26, 2006

The U.S.-Oman Free Trade Agreement is a trade pact between Oman and the United States. On November 15, 2004, the George W. Bush administration notified the U.S. Congress of its intent to sign a trade agreement with the Middle Eastern Sultanate of Oman. On January 19, 2006 the two countries signed the U.S.-Oman Free Trade Agreement (OFTA), which is part of the Bush administration's strategy to create a US - Middle East Free Trade Area (MEFTA) by 2013.

On June 29, 2006, the U.S. Senate passed OFTA by a vote of 60-34, the fewest "aye" votes in the Senate of any trade bill other than CAFTA. On July 20, 2006, the U.S. House of Representatives passed OFTA by a vote of 221-205, with 7 abstentions. For procedural reasons, the Senate took a second vote on September 19, 2006, and the bill's implementing bill was passed 62-32, with 6 abstentions. In all, the Senate approved the bill 63-37, since all senators voted either "aye" or "nay" in one of the two votes.

George W. Bush signed the bill into law on September 26, 2006. And on December 29, 2008 signed the proclamation to implement the agreement with effective date of January 1, 2009.

== Views in favor of OFTA ==
According to the U.S. Trade Representative's office and other proponents of the pact, OFTA is an important step towards reducing barriers to trade in goods and services in Oman.

- USTR Site on OFTA
- Emergency Committee for American Trade Site on OFTA
- House Ways and Means Committee's Republican Leadership's Site on OFTA

== See more ==
- Rules of Origin
- Market access
- Free-trade area
- Tariffs
