= Fiscal union =

Integration of the fiscal policy of nations or states

Fiscal union is the integration of the fiscal policy of nations or states. In a fiscal union, decisions about the collection and expenditure of taxes are taken by common institutions, shared by the participating governments. A fiscal union does not imply the centralisation of spending and tax decisions at the supranational level. Centralisation of these decisions would open up not only the possibility of inherent risk sharing through the supranational tax and transfer system but also economic stabilisation through debt management at the supranational level. Proper management would reduce the effects of asymmetric shocks that would be shared both with other countries and with future generations. Fiscal union also implies that the debt would be financed not by individual countries but by a common bond.

In the European Union, fiscal union has been mooted as a next step forward into deeper European integration but, as of July 2022, remains largely just a proposal. If fiscal union were to happen, national expenditure and tax rates would be set at European Council level. There would be Eurobonds instead of individual national bonds that would finance collective Euro debt.

Stages of economic integration around the World (each country colored according to the most integrated multilateral agreement that it participates in): Economic and monetary union (ECCU/XCD, Eurozone/EUR, Switzerland–Liechtenstein/CHF) Economic union (CSME, EAEU, EU, GCC, Mercosur, SICA) Common market (EEA–Switzerland) Customs and monetary union (CEMAC/XAF, UEMOA/XOF) Customs union (CAN, EAC, EUCU, SACU) Multilateral free-trade area (AANZFTA, ASEAN, CEFTA, CISFTA, COMESA, CPTPP, EFTA, GAFTA, PAFTA, RCEP, SADCFTA, SAFTA, USMCA)

== European Union ==
It is often proposed that the European Union should adopt a form of fiscal union. Most member states of the EU participate in economic and monetary union (EMU), based on the euro currency, but most decisions about taxes and spending remain at the national level. Therefore, although the European Union has a monetary union, it does not have a fiscal union.

Laruffa describes the European economic governance as "an economic constitution made by rules, policies and institutional practices aimed to establish the a fiscal-monetary policy mix, competition rules, financial markets regulations, the single market and international trade policies. When the euro was created, monetary policy was established as a centralized policy, while fiscal policy remained in the hands of national authorities under some institutional arrangements for sound budgetary policy and an ex-ante control by the European Commission."

Control over fiscal policy is considered central to national sovereignty, and in the world today there is no substantial fiscal union between independent nations. However the EU has certain limited fiscal powers. It has a role in deciding the level of VAT (consumption taxes) and tariffs on external trade. It also spends a budget of many billions of euros. There is furthermore a Stability and Growth Pact (SGP) among members of the Eurozone (common currency area) intended to co-ordinate the fiscal policies of member states. Under the SGP, member states report their economic plans to the European Commission and explain how they are to achieve medium-term budgetary objectives. Then the Commission evaluates these plans and the report is sent to the Economic and Financial Committee for comments. Finally, the Council of Economic and Finance Ministers decides by qualified majority whether to accept the Commission's recommendation to the member state or to rewrite the text. However, under the SGP, no countries have ever been fined for not meeting the objectives and the effort to punish France and Germany in 2003 was not fulfilled.

On 2 March 2012, all members of the European Union, except the Czech Republic (who joined later) and the United Kingdom, signed the European Fiscal Compact, which was ratified on 1 April 2014. The treaty is designed to implement stricter caps on government spending and borrowing, including automatic sanctions for countries breaking the rules. The results of the treaty on the Eurozone economy, are yet to be known.

With the crisis of the euro area deepening, more and more attention has been put by scholars on completing the fiscal side of the monetary union. Marzinotto, Sapir and Guntram Wolff (2011), for example, were among the first to call for proper fiscal resources at the federal level that would allow to stabilize the financial system and if necessary help individual countries (What kind of fiscal union?).

== Advantages of fiscal union ==
In the view of some economists, European fiscal union with strong institutions would be able to manage the EU economy as a whole more appropriately. The benefits from this union would be seen both in the short and in the long term. In case of a future crisis, the probability of its appearance would decrease, and in case of occurrence it would be less severe. The emergence of fiscal union would ensure more creditability towards developing European countries because risks will be shared among all the state members. Weaker Euro countries would benefit from sharing the same Euro bonds as more creditworthy countries. Also, a centralised fiscal policy will introduce more tools for a particular policy implementation rather than national policies. By transferring some fiscal responsibilities to the centre, it would offset the decrease of some stabilisation capacity at the country level resulted from active control of national budgets.

== See also ==
- Criticisms of globalization
- Fiscal policies in the Eurozone
- Fiscal federalism
- European integration
