= Lists of free trade agreements =

Free trade agreements or free trade areas are listed as follows:

- List of multilateral free trade agreements
- List of bilateral free trade agreements

== See also ==
- Customs union
- Single market
- Economic union
- Customs and monetary union
- Economic and monetary union
