= Cross-national cooperation and agreements =

Integration is a political and economic agreement among countries that gives preference to member countries to the agreement. General integration can be achieved in three different approachable ways: through the World Trade Organization (WTO), bilateral integration, and regional integration. In bilateral integration, only two countries economically cooperate with one another, whereas in regional integration, several countries within the same geographic distance become joint to form organizations such as the European Union (EU) and the North American Free Trade Agreement (NAFTA). Indeed, factors of mobility like capital, technology and labour are indicating strategies for cross-national integration along with those mentioned above.

== The World Trade Organization ==
The WTO is one of the most effective trade agreements among nations. The WTO replaced the General Agreement on Tariffs and Trade (GATT) in 1995 and has 125 member nations. Currently 164 member are part of WTO. Many believe GATT initiated rampant liberalization in trade in 1947 and its move contributed to the expansion of trade all over the world by eliminating tariff and quotas. Moreover, WTO continued GATT's principle with more multilateral forum, which enables governments to settle agreements or to dispute them regarding trade.

Rapid growth of trade among nations has forced the agreement to be acknowledged as a fundamental basis for the member nations to follow certain rules and regulations as the signatories of the agreement. As a result, WTO expanded its mission to include trade in services, investments, intellectual property, sanitary measures, plant health, agriculture, and textiles, as well as technical barriers to trade.

== The European Union (EU) ==
The largest and most comprehensive regional economic group is the EU. It began as a free trade agreement with the goal to become a customs union and to integrate in other ways. The formation of the European Parliament and the establishment of a Euro the common currency make EU the most ambitious in comparison to other regional trade groups. It progressed from being the European Economic Community (EEC) to the European Community (EC) to finally the European Union. Iceland, Liechtenstein, Norway, and Switzerland who decided not to leave European Free Trade Area are linked together with the EU as a customs union. The EU comprises 28 countries, including 12 countries from mostly Central and Eastern Europe that joined since 2004. The EU abolished trade barriers on intra-zonal trade, instituted a common external tariff, created a common currency, the euro.

The implications of the EU for corporate strategy are:

- Companies need to determine where to produce products.
- Companies need to determine what their entry strategy will be.
- Companies need to balance the commonness of the EU with national differences.

== North American Free Trade Agreement (NAFTA) ==
NAFTA is designed to eliminate tariff barriers and liberalize investment opportunities and trade in services. NAFTA includes Canada, Mexico, and the United States, where went into effect in 1994. The United States and Canada historically have had various forms of mutual economic cooperation. They signed the Canada-United States Free Trade Agreement effective January 1, 1989, which eliminated all tariffs on bilateral trade by January 1, 1998. In February 1991, Mexico approached the United States to establish a free trade agreement. The formal negotiations that began in June 1991 included Canada. The resulting North American Free Trade Agreement became effective on January 1, 1994.

The main provisions in NAFTA are:

- the harmonization of trade rules,
- the liberalization of restrictions on services and foreign investment,
- the enforcement of intellectual property rights,
- a dispute settlement process,
- regional labour laws and standards, and
- strengthened environmental standards.

== Regional economic integration in the Americas ==
There are six major regional economic groups in the Americas and they can be further divided into Central America and South America. The major reason for these different groups in Central and South America entering into collaboration was market size. The Caribbean Community and Common Market (CARICOM) and the Central American Common Market (CACM) are both found in Central America. The two major blocs in South America are the Andean Community (CAN) and the Southern Common Market (MERCOSUR) which is the major trade group. MERCOSUR comprises Brazil, Argentina, Paraguay, and Uruguay. It generates 75 percent of South America's GDP and this makes MERCOSUR the fourth largest trade bloc in the world after the EU, NAFTA, and the Association of Southeast Asian Nations (ASEAN).

Since August 23, 2008, there exists another integration initiative, the Union of South American Nations (UNASUR). It includes all independent states of South America with about 400 Million people and intends to create a level of integration similar to the European Union by 2025.

== Regional economic integration in Asia ==
Regional economic integration has not been as successful in Asia as in the EU or NAFTA because most Asian countries have relied on U.S. and European markets for their exports. The Association of Southeast Asian Nations (ASEAN), formed in 1967, consisted of the following countries: Brunei, Cambodia, Indonesia, Laos, Malaysia, Myanmar, Philippines, Singapore, Thailand, and Vietnam. The ASEAN Free Trade Area (AFTA), formed officially in 1993, was for the purpose of cutting tariffs on inter-regional trade to a maximum of 5% by 2008. ASEAN is the third largest free trade agreement in the world after the EU and NAFTA and above MERCOSUR. The Asia Pacific Economic Cooperation (APEC), founded in 1989, was to promote multilateral economic cooperation in trade and investment in the Pacific Rim. APEC is composed of 21 countries that border the Pacific Rim; progress toward free trade is hampered by size and geographic distance between member countries and the lack of a treaty.

== Regional economic integration in Africa ==
There are several regional trade groups in Africa that are registered with the WTO, including:

- the Southern Africa Development Community (SADC)
- the Common Market for Eastern and Southern Africa (COMESA)
- the Economic and Monetary Community of Central Africa
- the West African Economic and Monetary Union (WAEMU)

Created in 2002 by 53 African nations, the African Union took the place of the Organization of African Unity (OAU). The OAU was established in 1963 and focuses its energy and resources on political issues in Africa (notably colonialism and racism) and the pursuit of market liberalization and economic growth in Africa.
