= Trade bloc =

Intergovernmental open trading group

A trade bloc is a type of intergovernmental agreement, often part of a regional intergovernmental organization, where barriers to trade (tariffs and others) are reduced or eliminated among the participating states.

Trade blocs can be stand-alone agreements between several states (such as the USMCA) or part of a regional organization (such as the European Union). Depending on the level of economic integration, trade blocs can be classified as preferential trading areas, free-trade areas, customs unions, common markets, or economic and monetary unions.

== Use ==
Stages of economic integration around the world (each country colored according to the most integrated multilateral agreement that it participates in): Economic and monetary union (ECCU/XCD, Eurozone/EUR, Switzerland–Liechtenstein/CHF) Economic union (CSME, EAEU, EU, GCC, Mercosur, SICA) Common market (European single market) Customs and monetary union (CEMAC/XAF, UEMOA/XOF) Customs union (CAN, EAC, EUCU, SACU) Multilateral free-trade area (AANZFTA, ASEAN, CEFTA, CISFTA, COMESA, CPTPP, EFTA, GAFTA, PAFTA, RCEP, SADCFTA, SAFTA, USMCA)

Historic trading blocs include the Hanseatic League, a Northern European economic alliance between the 12th and 17th centuries, and the German Customs Union, formed on the basis of the German Confederation and subsequently the German Empire from 1871. Surges of trade bloc formation occurred in the 1960s and 1970s, as well as in the 1990s after the collapse of Communism. By 1997, more than 50% of all international commerce was conducted within regional trade blocs. Economist Jeffrey J. Schott of the Peterson Institute for International Economics notes that members of successful trade blocs usually share four common traits: similar levels of per capita GNI, geographic proximity, similar or compatible trading regimes, and political commitment to regional organization.

Some advocates of global free trade are opposed to trading blocs. Trade blocs are seen by them to encourage regional free trade at the expense of global free trade. Those who advocate for it claim that global free trade is in the interest of every country, as it would create more opportunities to turn local resources into goods and services that are both currently in demand and will be in demand in the future by consumers. However, scholars and economists continue to debate whether regional trade blocs fragment the global economy or encourage the extension of the existing global multilateral trading system.

== Terminology ==
A common market is seen as a stage of economic integration towards an economic union or possibly towards the goal of a unified market.

A single market is a type of trade bloc in which most trade barriers have been removed (for goods) with some common policies on product regulation, and freedom of movement of the factors of production (capital and labour) and of enterprise and services.

== Statistics ==
Selection of GDP PPP data (top 10 countries and blocs) in no particular order

This list is based on the data obtained from United Nations Statistics Division.
Trade bloc	Population	Gross domestic product (USD)				Members
Trade bloc	Population	2006	2007	growth	per capita	Members
Economic and monetary unions
EMU	324,879,195	10,685,946,928,310	12,225,304,229,686	14.41%	37,630	17: Austria; Belgium; Cyprus; Estonia; Finland; France; Germany; Greece; Ireland; Italy; Luxembourg; Malta; Netherlands; Portugal; Slovakia; Slovenia; Spain
OECS (sovereign states)	593,905	3,752,679,562	3,998,281,731	6.54%	6,732	6: Antigua and Barbuda; Dominica; Grenada; Saint Kitts and Nevis; Saint Lucia; Saint Vincent and the Grenadines
OII	504,476	12,264,278,329	14,165,953,200	15.51%	28,081	3: French Polynesia; New Caledonia; Wallis and Futuna
CCCM	6,418,417	39,616,485,623	43,967,600,765	10.98%	6,850	12: 6 OECS members; Barbados; Belize; Guyana; Jamaica; Suriname; Trinidad and Tobago
Customs and monetary unions
CEMAC	39,278,645	51,265,460,685	58,519,380,755	14.15%	1,490	6: Cameroon; Central African Republic; Chad; Republic of the Congo; Equatorial Guinea; Gabon
UEMOA	90,299,945	50,395,629,494	58,453,871,283	15.99%	647	8: Benin; Burkina Faso; Ivory Coast; Guinea-Bissau; Mali; Niger; Senegal; Togo
Customs unions
CAN	96,924,486	281,269,141,372	334,172,968,648	18.81%	3,448	4: Bolivia; Colombia; Ecuador; Peru
EAC	127,107,838	49,882,030,443	61,345,180,041	22.98%	483	5: Burundi; Kenya; Rwanda; Tanzania; Uganda
EUCU	574,602,745	15,331,827,900,202	17,679,376,474,719	15.31%	30,768	33: 30 EEA members; Andorra; San Marino; Turkey
GCC	36,154,528	724,460,151,595	802,641,302,477	10.79%	22,200	6: Bahrain; Kuwait; Oman; Qatar; Saudi Arabia; United Arab Emirates
MERCOSUR	271,304,946	1,517,510,000,000	1,886,817,000,000	12.44%	9,757	5: Argentina; Brazil; Paraguay; Uruguay
SACU	58,000,000	1,499,811,549,187	1,848,337,158,281	23.24%	6,885	5: Botswana; Lesotho; Namibia; South Africa; Eswatini
Preferential trade areas and Free trade areas
AANZFTA-ASEAN+3	2,085,858,841	10,216,029,899,764	11,323,947,181,804	10.84%	5,429	15: 10 ASEAN members; Australia; China; (Hong Kong); (Macau); Japan; New Zealand; South Korea
ALADI	499,807,662	2,823,198,095,131	3,292,088,771,480	16.61%	6,587	12: 4 CAN members; 5 MERCOSUL members; Chile; Cuba; Mexico
AFTZ	553,915,405	643,541,709,413	739,927,625,273	14.98%	1,336	26: 5 EAC members; 5 SACU members; Angola; Comoros; Democratic Republic of the Congo; Djibouti; Egypt; Eritrea; Ethiopia; Libya; Madagascar; Malawi; Mauritius; Mozambique; Seychelles; Sudan; Zambia; Zimbabwe
APTA	2,714,464,027	4,868,614,302,744	5,828,692,637,764	19.72%	2,147	6: Bangladesh; China; (Hong Kong); (Macau); India; Laos; Sri Lanka; South Korea
CARIFORUM-EUCU-OCTs	592,083,950	15,437,771,092,522	17,798,283,524,961	15.29%	30,060	67: 12 CCCM members; 33 EUCU members; 3 OII members; Anguilla; Aruba; Bahamas; British Antarctic Territory; British Indian Ocean Territory; British Virgin Islands; Cayman Islands; Dominican Republic; Falkland Islands; French Southern and Antarctic Lands; Greenland; Mayotte; Montserrat; Netherlands Antilles; Pitcairn Islands; Saint Helena, Ascension and Tristan da Cunha; South Georgia and the South Sandwich Islands; Saint Pierre and Miquelon; Turks and Caicos Islands
CACM	37,388,063	87,209,524,889	97,718,800,794	12.05%	2,614	5: Costa Rica; El Salvador; Guatemala; Honduras; Nicaragua
CEFTA	27,968,711	110,263,802,023	135,404,501,031	22.80%	4,841	8: Albania; Bosnia and Herzegovina; Croatia; Kosovo; North Macedonia; Moldova; Montenegro; Serbia
CISFTA	272,897,834	1,271,909,586,018	1,661,429,920,721	30.62%	6,088	11: 6 EAEC members; Armenia; Azerbaijan; Georgia; Ukraine; Moldova
DR-CAFTA-US	356,964,477	13,345,469,865,037	14,008,686,684,089	4.97%	39,244	7: 5 CACM members; Dominican Republic; United States; (Puerto Rico)
ECOWAS	283,096,250	215,999,071,943	255,784,634,128	18.42%	904	15: 8 UEMOA members; Cape Verde; Gambia; Ghana; Guinea; Liberia; Nigeria; Sierra Leone
EEA (EU + EFTA)	499,620,521	14,924,076,504,592	17,186,876,431,709	15.16%	34,400	30: 27 EU members; Iceland; Liechtenstein; Norway
EFTA-SACU	68,199,991	1,021,509,931,918	1,139,385,636,888	11.54%	16,707	9: 4 EFTA members; 5 SACU members
EAEC	207,033,990	1,125,634,333,117	1,465,256,182,498	30.17%	7,077	6: Belarus; Kazakhstan; Kyrgyzstan; Russia; Tajikistan; Uzbekistan
USMCA	449,227,672	15,337,094,304,218	16,189,097,801,318	5.56%	36,038	3: Canada; Mexico; United States; (Puerto Rico)
TPP	25,639,622	401,810,366,865	468,101,167,294	16.50%	18,257	4: Brunei; Chile; New Zealand; Singapore
SAARC	1,567,187,373	1,162,684,650,544	1,428,392,756,312	22.85%	911	8: Afghanistan; Bangladesh; Bhutan; India; Maldives; Nepal; Pakistan; Sri Lanka
SPARTECA	35,079,659	918,557,785,031	1,102,745,750,172	20.05%	31,435	21: 3 OII members; 12 PICTA members; Australia; Marshall Islands; New Zealand; Palau; Timor-Leste; Tokelau
Pacific Alliance	218,649,115	1,371,197,216,140	1,525,825,175,045	11.28%	6,978	4: Colombia; Chile; Peru; Mexico

== Comparison between regional trade blocs ==
		Activities
Regional bloc		Free Trade Area	Economic and monetary union			Free Travel		Political pact	Defence pact	Other
Regional bloc		Free Trade Area	Customs union	Single market	Currency union	Visa-free	Border-less	Political pact	Defence pact	Other
EU		in force	in force^{7}	in force^{2}	in force^{1}	in force	in force (Schengen^{1, 7}, NPU and CTA^{1})	in force	in force (CFSP/ESDP^{1})	ESA^{1, 7}
EFTA		in force		in force^{2, 7}		in force	in force^{1, 7}		in force^{1, 7}	ESA^{1, 7}
CARICOM		in force	in force	in force ^{1}	in force^{1} and proposed common	in force^{1}	proposed	proposed		NWFZ
AU	ECOWAS	in force^{1, 3}	in force^{1}	proposed	in force^{1} and proposed for 2012^{1} and proposed common	in force^{1}	proposed	proposed	in force	NWFZ^{1}
AU	ECCAS	in force^{1}	African Continental Free Trade Agreement (AfCFTA)^{1}	in force^{1}	proposed	in force^{1}	in force		in force	NWFZ^{1}
AU	EAC	in force	in force	proposed for 2020s	proposed for 2024	proposed	?	proposed for 2023		NWFZ^{1}
AU	SADC	in force^{1}	in force^{1}	proposed for 2015	de facto in force^{1} and proposed common for 2016	proposed				NWFZ^{1}
AU	COMESA	in force^{1}	proposed for 2010	?	proposed for 2018					NWFZ^{1}
AU	Common	in force^{1}	proposed for 2019	proposed for 2023	proposed for 2028			proposed for 2028		NWFZ^{1}
Pacific Alliance		in force				in force				NWFZ
USAN	MERCOSUR	in force	in force	proposed for 2015		in force		proposed for 2014		NWFZ
USAN	CAN	in force	in force^{1}	proposed^{1}		in force				NWFZ
USAN	Common	proposed for 2014^{4}	proposed for not after 2019	proposed for 2019	proposed for 2019	in force	proposed for 2019	proposed	in force	NWFZ
EEU		in force	in force^{1}	in force	proposed	in force			in force^{1}
AL	GCC	in force	in force	proposed	proposed^{1}	in force			in force
AL	Common	in force^{1}	proposed for 2015	proposed for 2020	proposed			proposed
ASEAN		in force^{5}		proposed for 2015	proposed^{8}	in force		proposed for 2015	proposed for 2020	NWFZ
CAIS		in force^{1}	proposed	?		in force^{1}	in force^{1}	proposed		NWFZ
CEFTA		in force								RCC^{7}
USMCA		in force				in force ^{1}			in force^{1, 7}
SAARC		in force^{1, 6}	proposed	proposed		in force^{9}
PIF		proposed for 2021^{1}								NWFZ^{1}

^{1} not all members participating
^{2} involving goods, services, telecommunications, transport (full liberalisation of railways from 2012), energy (full liberalisation from 2007)
^{3} telecommunications, transport and energy - proposed
^{4} sensitive goods to be covered from 2019

^{5} least developed members to join from 2012
^{6} least developed members to join from 2017
^{7} Additionally some non member states also participate (the European Union, EFTA have overlapping membership and various common initiatives regarding the European integration).
^{8} Additionally some non member states also participate (ASEAN Plus Three)
^{9} Limited to "entitled persons" and duration of one year.

=== Lists of trade blocs ===
- List of preferential trade areas
- Lists of free trade agreements
  - List of bilateral free trade agreements
  - List of multilateral free trade agreements
- List of customs unions
- List of common markets
- List of economic unions
- List of monetary unions
- List of customs and monetary unions
- List of economic and monetary unions
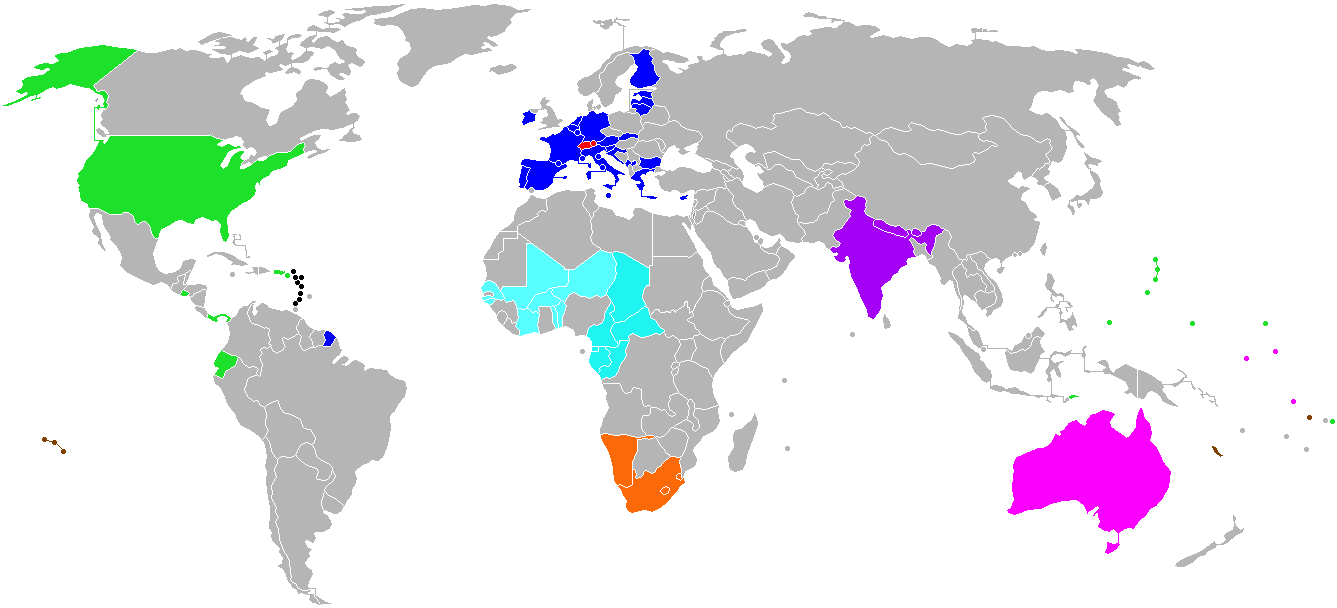
Monetary unions

Customs unions worldwide

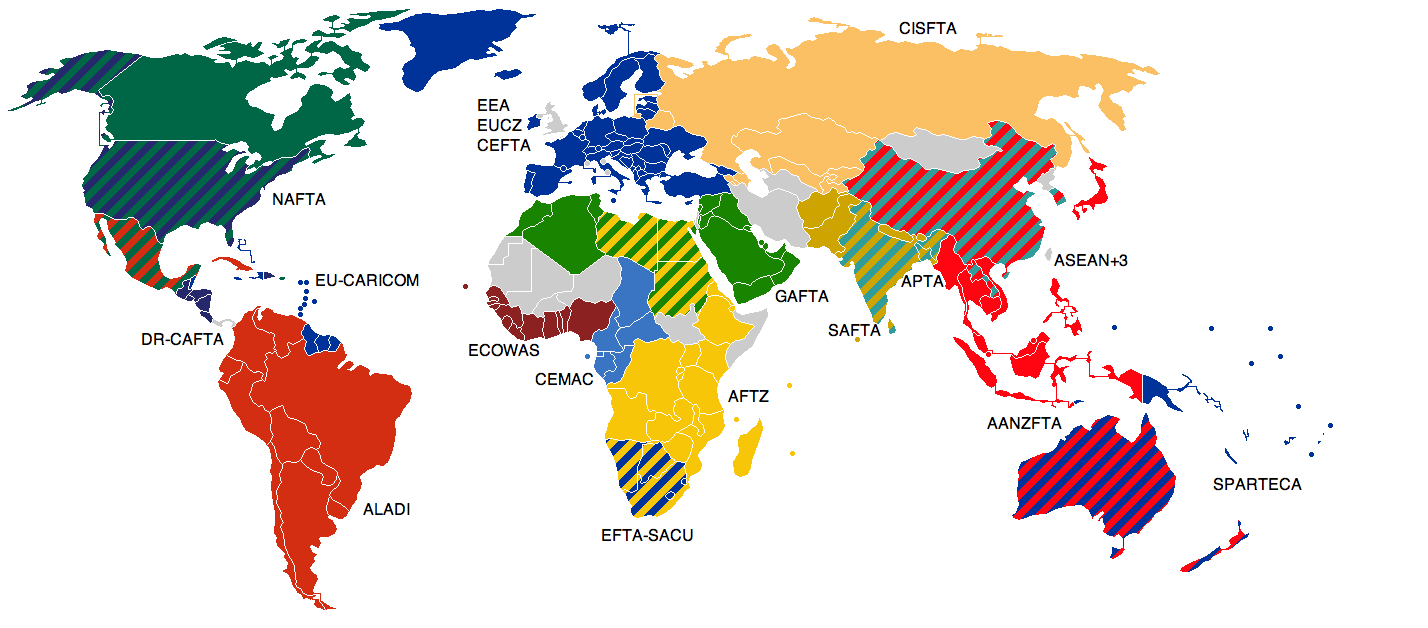
Free trade areas worldwide

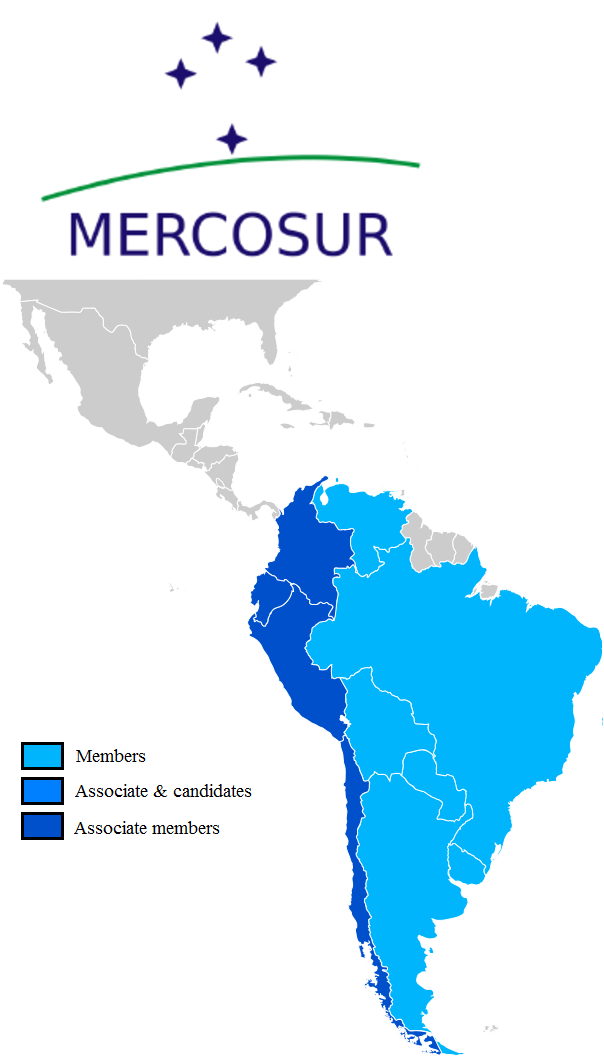
Mercosur

== See also ==
- Regional integration
- Continental union

== Bibliography ==
- Mansfield, Edward D. and Helen V. Milner, "The New Wave of Regionalism" in Diehl, Paul F. (2005). The Politics of Global Governance: International Organizations in an Interdependent World. Boulder: Lynne Rienner Publishers. ISBN 978-1-55587-654-8.
- Milner, Helen V., "International Trade" in Carlsnaes, Walter; Thomas Risse; Beth A. Simmons (2002). Handbook of International Relations. London: SAGE Publications. ISBN 978-0-7619-6304-2.
- O'Loughlin, John; Luc Anselin (1996). "Geo-Economic Competition and Trade Bloc Formation: United States, German, and Japanese Exports, 1968–1992". Economic Geography. 72 (2): 131–160. doi:10.2307/144263. JSTOR 144263.
- Schott, Jeffrey J. (1991). "Trading blocs and the world trading system". World Economy. 14 (1): 1–17. doi:10.1111/j.1467-9701.1991.tb00748.x.
