= Free area =

Free area could refer to:

- Free trade area
- Unincorporated area (municipality-free areas)
- Pedestrian zone (Car-free area)
- Taiwan Area (free area of the Republic of China)
