= Comtel =

Comtel may refer to:

- Comtel Air, a former Austrian airline
- COMTEL Project, an African telecom project
- Comtel, a former UK Cable TV company, see Telecential
