= Trade agreement =

Wide ranging taxes, tariff and trade treaty

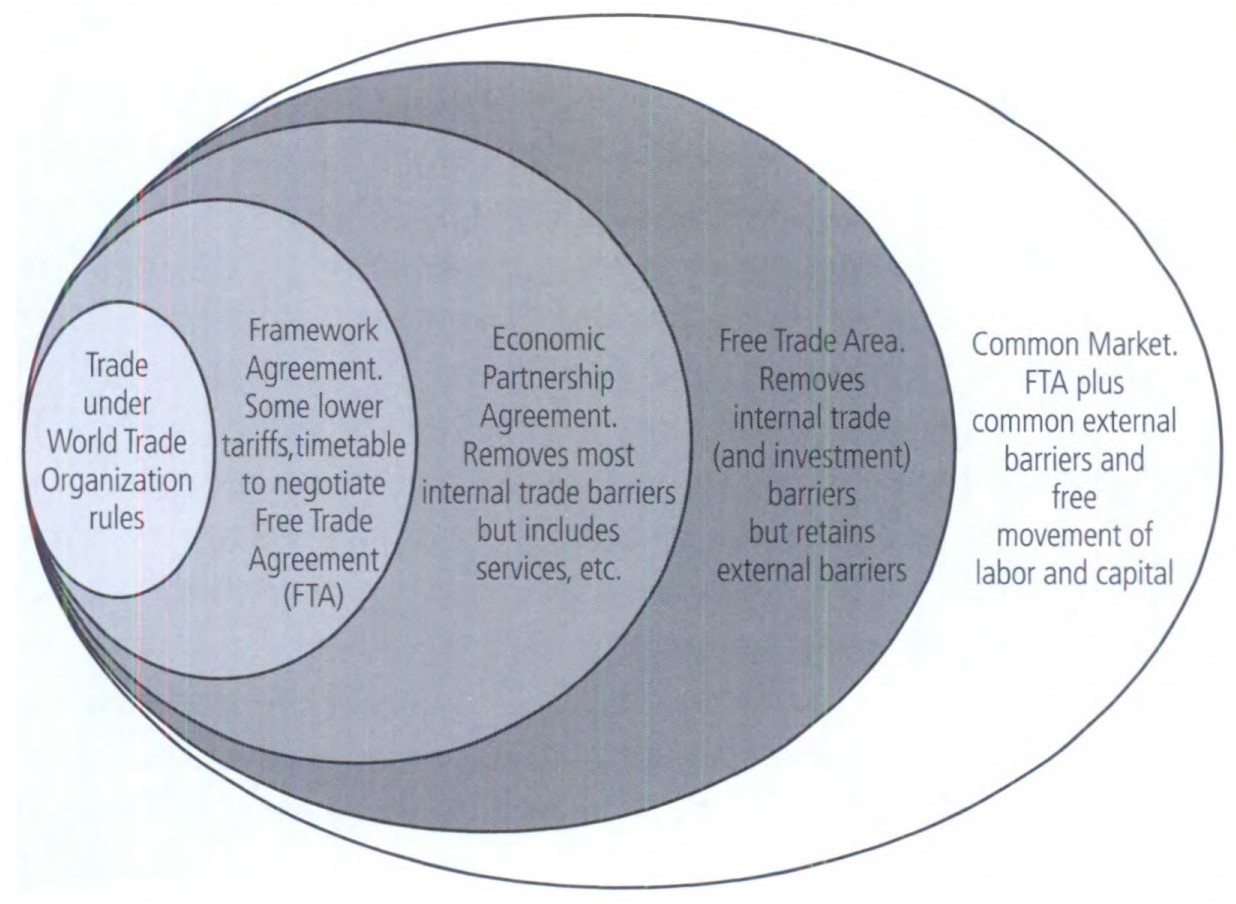
Types of trading arrangements (arranged by intensity of economic integration)

A trade agreement (also known as trade pact) is a wide-ranging taxes, tariff and trade treaty that often includes investment guarantees. It exists when two or more countries agree on terms that help them trade with each other. The most common trade agreements are of the preferential and free trade types, which are concluded in order to reduce (or eliminate) tariffs, quotas and other trade restrictions on items traded between the signatories.

The logic of formal trade agreements is that they outline what is agreed upon and specify the punishments for deviation from the rules set in the agreement. Trade agreements therefore make misunderstandings less likely, and create confidence on both sides that cheating will be punished; this increases the likelihood of long-term cooperation. An international organization, such as the IMF, can further incentivize cooperation by monitoring compliance with agreements and reporting third countries of the violations. Monitoring by international agencies may be needed to detect non-tariff barriers, which are disguised attempts at creating trade barriers.

Trade pacts are frequently politically contentious, as they might pit the winners and losers of an agreement against each other. Aside from their provisions on reducing tariffs, contentious issues in modern free trade agreements may revolve around regulatory harmonization on issues such as intellectual property regulations, labour rights, and environmental and safety regulations. Increasing efficiency and economic gains through free trade is a common goal.

The anti-globalization movement opposes trade agreements almost by definition, although some groups normally allied within that movement, such as leftist parties, might support fair trade or safe trade provisions that moderate real and perceived ill effects of globalization. In response to criticism, free trade agreements have increasingly over time come with measures that seek to reduce the negative externalities of trade liberalization.

== Classification of trade pacts ==
=== By number and type of signatories ===
There are three different types of trade agreements. The first is unilateral trade agreement, this is what happens when a country wants certain restrictions to be enforced but no other countries want them to be imposed. This also allows countries to decrease the amount of trade restrictions. That is also something that does not happen often and could impair a country.

The second type is a bilateral trade agreement, when signed by two parties, where each party may be a country (or other customs territory), a trade bloc or an informal group of countries (or other customs territories). Both countries loosen their trade restrictions to help businesses, so that they can prosper better between the different countries. This definitely helps lower taxes and it helps them converse about their trade status. Usually, this revolves around subsided domestic industries. Mainly the industries fall under automotive, oil, or food industries.

A trade agreement signed between more than two sides (typically neighboring or in the same region) is classified as multilateral. These face the most obstacles- when negotiating substance, and for implementation. The more countries that are involved, the harder it is to reach mutual satisfaction. Once this type of trade agreement is settled on, it becomes a very powerful agreement. The larger the GDP of the signatories, the greater the impact on other global trade relationships. The largest multilateral trade agreement is the North American Free Trade Agreement, involving the United States, Canada, and Mexico.

=== By geographical region ===
These are between countries in a certain area. The most powerful ones include a few countries that are near each other in a geographical area. These countries often have similar histories, demographics and economic goals.

The North American Free Trade Agreement (NAFTA) was established on January 1, 1989, between the United States, Canada, and Mexico. This agreement was designed to reduce tariff barriers in North America.

The Eurasian Economic Union (EAEU) was established in 2015 and currently consists of five member states: Armenia, Belarus, Kazakhstan, Kyrgyzstan, and Russia. It is designed to foster economic integration among its member states and promote economic growth in the region.

The Association of Southeast Asian Nations (ASEAN) was formed in 1967 between the countries of Indonesia, Malaysia, the Philippines, Singapore, and Thailand. It was established to promote political partnership and maintain economic stability throughout the region.

=== By level of integration ===
Stages of economic integration around the world (each country colored according to the most integrated multilateral agreement that it participates in): Economic and monetary union (ECCU/XCD, Eurozone/EUR, Switzerland–Liechtenstein/CHF) Economic union (CSME, EAEU, EU, GCC, Mercosur, SICA) Common market (European single market) Customs and monetary union (CEMAC/XAF, UEMOA/XOF) Customs union (CAN, EAC, EUCU, SACU) Multilateral free-trade area (AANZFTA, ASEAN, CEFTA, CISFTA, COMESA, CPTPP, EFTA, GAFTA, PAFTA, RCEP, SADCFTA, SAFTA, USMCA)

There are a variety of trade agreements; with some being quite complex (European Union), while others are less intensive (North American Free Trade Agreement). The resulting level of economic integration depends on the specific type of trade pacts and policies adopted by the trade bloc:

1. Separate
  - Trade and Investment Framework Agreement (TIFA)
  - Bilateral Investment Treaty (BIT)
  - Preferential Trade Arrangement (PTA)–limited scope and depth of tariffs reduction between the customs territories.
    - Free Trade Agreement establishing a Free Trade Area (FTA)–extensive reduction or elimination of tariffs on substantially all trade allowing for the free movement of goods and in more advanced agreements also reduction of restrictions on investment and establishment allowing for the free movement of capital and free movement of services
      - Common market–FTA with significantly reduced or eliminated restrictions on the freedom of movement of all factors of production, including free movement of labour and of enterprise; and coordination in economic policy
  - Currency union–sharing the same currency
2. Composite
  - Customs union–FTA with common external tariffs of all signatories in respect to non-signatory countries
    - Customs and monetary union–Customs union with Currency union
    - Economic union–Customs union with Common market
      - Economic and monetary union (EMU)–Economic union with Currency Union
        - Fiscal union–common coordination of substantial parts of the fiscal policies (proposed step between EMU and Complete economic integration)

=== Special agreements ===
- World Trade Organization treaty
  - agreements in the WTO framework (Textile Agreement and others)
- the now defunct Multilateral Agreement on Investment (in the OECD framework)

=== By the World Trade Organization ===
Typically the benefits and obligations of the trade agreements apply only to their signatories.

In the framework of the World Trade Organization, different agreement types are concluded (mostly during new member accessions), whose terms apply to all WTO members on the so-called most-favored basis (MFN), which means that beneficial terms agreed bilaterally with one trading partner will apply also to the rest of the WTO members.

All agreements concluded outside of the WTO framework (and granting additional benefits beyond the WTO MFN level, but applicable only between the signatories and not to the rest of the WTO members) are called preferential by the WTO. According to WTO rules, these agreements are subject to certain requirements such as notification to the WTO and general reciprocity (the preferences should apply equally to each of the signatories of the agreement) where unilateral preferences (some of the signatories gain preferential access to the market of the other signatories, without lowering their own tariffs) are allowed only under exceptional circumstances and as temporary measure.

The trade agreements called preferential by the WTO are also known as regional (RTA), despite not necessarily concluded by countries within a certain region. There are currently 205 agreements in force as of July 2007. Over 300 have been reported to the WTO. The number of FTA has increased significantly over the last decade. Between 1948 and 1994, the General Agreement on Tariffs and Trade (GATT), the predecessor to the WTO, received 124 notifications. Since 1995 over 300 trade agreements have been enacted.

The WTO is further classifying these agreements in the following types:

- Goods covering:
  - basic preferential trade agreement (a.k.a. partial scope agreement)
  - free trade agreement
  - customs union
- Services covering:
  - Economic Integration Agreement–any agreement, including a basic PTA, that covers also services

== See also ==
- Trade and development
- Trade creation
- Trade preference
- Permanent Normal Trade Relations (PNTR)

Lists:

- List of international trade topics
- List of free trade agreements
- List of trade blocs
