= Alliance marketing =

Alliance marketing is joining two or more organizations on the purpose of sharing marketing strategy, promoting concepts, services or products. Basically, alliance marketing can imply to any business as long as it finds an organization that has a mutual goal.

Alliance Marketing is similar to Joint Venture Marketing. Except it does not always involve the creation of a new company or brand in the right to sell its product or service.

Alliance marketing is also used where a group of companies often in new technology areas come together to sell the technology concept. An alliance will always have a common theme which all stakeholders can benefit from. Stakeholders stands for are groups of individuals within whom the organisation has interacts and has interdependency.

== History ==
Alliance marketing is built for controlling organisation's marketing cost. Distinctive from coexisting marketing, which is based on the game, alliance marketing is based on strategic perspective considering organisation marketing operation, from the interior to exterior resources. Exterior resources can be, for example, organisation's public relation, environmental resources, supplier, political environment.

The role of alliance marketing is to provide the organisation a way to promote its product while producing, advertising and making pricing strategy. The earliest alliance marketing is in the form of marketing economic union, price alliance and service alliance.

== Types of alliance ==
=== Alliances of non-competitive businesses. ===
This is alliance form when two or more organisation join together to offer end-to-end service to the same customer. For example, auto-repair business joins together to serve the customer.

=== Destination alliances ===
This is where tourism industry organisation merge marketing resources to promote their location or destination to tourism. For example, the tourism industry in South Pacific where individual organisation have weak marketing resources, corporate to promote eco-tourism.

=== Technology alliances ===
This is a form to advertise new devices or concept, and to join resources and marketing power together. The alliance used to avoid failure to compete with alternative technology and ensure they have the chance to research and develop the technology.

=== Alliances to expand into new markets ===
It is useful when an organisation requires a huge investment of resources and to develop new distribution channels. For example, organisation establish an international market needs an alliance to a local company to enter the new foreign market.

=== Domestic expansion ===
This forms of alliance help the organisation expand domestically by having more resources and marketing power. For example, the alliance between Pepsi and Starbucks create a bigger distribution network for ready-to-drink beverage, which gives revenue to both organisations without direct competition. Another example can be an alliance by the Japanese company between Sony and Ericsson corporation to sell mobile phones together.

== Why use alliance marketing ==
1. Gain access to different customer by combining the marketing resources, which include targeting consumers together.
2. Gain specialist knowledge and marketing methods.
3. Reduce cost by sharing resources
4. Share idea and responsibility.
5. Gain access to new market, for example, entering a new market in another country.

== Marketing economic alliance ==
Marketing economic alliance is a union that aims to units and organise marketing elite from a different region. To condense internet resources, organisation resources and personal resources all together, consequently, alliance marketing.

Marketing economic alliance is in forms of combining industry or regional marketing method with resources and regional advantages. It is combining marketing knowledge, marketing examples, marketing practice, marketing idea together.

Marketing alliance is the outcome of marketing economic alliance, it helps to better adapt to changing market environment, raise marketing power.
