= Tripartite Free Trade Area =

Proposed trade agreement

The Tripartite Free Trade Area (TFTA) is a partially implemented African free trade agreement between the Common Market for Eastern and Southern Africa (COMESA), Southern African Development Community (SADC) and East African Community (EAC). The 29 tripartite member/partner countries represent 53% of the African Union's membership, more than 60% of continental GDP ($1.88 trillion), and a combined population of 800 million.

The TFTA is intended to enhance the framework of the African Continental Free Trade Area (AfCFTA) which has the vision of bringing all 54 member states of the African Union into one single market. The TFTA is also an AfCFTA, which means that it works towards a greater purpose of boosting trade within Africa, increasing industrial development, and achieving balanced and sustainable economic growth in Africa.

A significant step forward in Africa's regional integration efforts, the TFTA's successful implementation gives member nations a platform to work together more efficiently, draw in investments, and raise the standard of living for their citizens through additional economic opportunities.

Using the Global Trade Analysis Project's (GTAP) computable general equilibrium model, a Journal from the Journal of African Trade suggests that the TFTA's tariff removals might increase intraregional trade by about 29%. Notably, industries including processed foods and light and heavy manufacturing are expected to increase significantly, indicating a favorable effect on member countries' industrialization.

== Key Milestones ==
June 10, 2015: The TFTA agreement was officially signed in Sharm El Sheikh, Egypt, marking a pivotal step towards regional economic integration.

July 25, 2024: The agreement came into force after reaching the required threshold of ratification by at least 14 member states. The initial countries that ratified the agreement include Angola, Botswana, Burundi, Egypt, Eswatini, Kenya, Lesotho, Malawi, Namibia, Rwanda, South Africa, Uganda, Zambia, and Zimbabwe. These nations account for approximately 75% of the tripartite GDP as of 2022

The TFTA is intended to become part of the African Continental Free Trade Area (AfCFTA), which was kickstarted in 2015 at the 25th African Union Summit in Johannesburg, South Africa and is to include all 54 African Union states as members of the free trade area.

== Challenges ==
Despite its potential benefits, the TFTA faces several challenges, including the need for harmonization of trade policies among diverse economies, addressing infrastructure deficits, and ensuring political commitment from all member states to implement agreed-upon protocols effectively.

Inadequate infrastructure, including transportation networks, energy supply, and digital connectivity, impedes the efficient movement of goods and services. Improving infrastructure is essential to facilitate trade and enhance competitiveness within the TFTA region. The implementation of the AfCFTA may lead to transitional challenges for member countries. These could involve (1) a decline in tax revenue due to reduced import tariffs; (2) increased income inequality; and (3) higher unemployment, particularly in regions where trade liberalization is not paired with labor market reforms that allow workers to adapt and seize new job opportunities. However, as the agreement envisions a gradual reduction in trade barriers, countries should have sufficient time to address and manage these potential issues.

== Partner states ==
Country	Current Trade Zone(s)
Angola	SADC
Botswana	SADC
Burundi	COMESA & EAC
Comoros	COMESA
Djibouti	COMESA
Democratic Republic of the Congo	COMESA & SADC
Egypt	COMESA
Eritrea	COMESA
Eswatini	COMESA & SADC
Ethiopia	COMESA
Kenya	COMESA & EAC
Lesotho	SADC
Libya	COMESA
Madagascar	COMESA & SADC
Malawi	COMESA & SADC
Mauritius	COMESA & SADC
Mozambique	SADC
Namibia	SADC
Rwanda	COMESA & EAC
Seychelles	COMESA & SADC
Somalia	COMESA & EAC
South Africa	SADC
South Sudan	EAC
Sudan	COMESA
Tanzania	SADC & EAC
Tunisia	COMESA
Uganda	COMESA & EAC
Zambia	COMESA & SADC
Zimbabwe	COMESA & SADC
