= Free trade area =

Regional trade agreement

Stages of economic integration around the world (each country colored according to the most integrated multilateral agreement that it participates in): Economic and monetary union (ECCU/XCD, Eurozone/EUR, Switzerland–Liechtenstein/CHF) Economic union (CSME, EAEU, EU, GCC, Mercosur, SICA) Common market (European single market) Customs and monetary union (CEMAC/XAF, UEMOA/XOF) Customs union (CAN, EAC, EUCU, SACU) Multilateral free-trade area (AANZFTA, ASEAN, CEFTA, CISFTA, COMESA, CPTPP, EFTA, GAFTA, PAFTA, RCEP, SADCFTA, SAFTA, USMCA)

A free trade area is the region encompassing a trade bloc whose member countries have signed a free trade agreement (FTA). Such agreements involve cooperation between at least two countries to reduce trade barriers and tariffs, and to increase trade of goods and services with each other. If natural persons are also free to move between the countries, in addition to a free trade agreement, it would also be considered an open border. It can be considered the second stage of economic integration.

Customs unions are a special type of free trade area. All such areas have internal arrangements which parties conclude in order to liberalize and facilitate trade among themselves. The crucial difference between customs unions and free trade areas is their approach to third parties. While a customs union requires all parties to establish and maintain identical external tariffs with regard to trade with non-parties, parties to a free trade area are not subject to this requirement. Instead, they may establish and maintain whatever tariff regime applying to imports from non-parties as deemed necessary. In a free trade area without harmonized external tariffs, to eliminate the risk of trade deflection, parties will adopt a system of preferential rules of origin.

The term free trade area was originally meant by the General Agreement on Tariffs and Trade (GATT 1994) to include only trade in goods. An agreement with a similar purpose, i.e., to enhance liberalization of trade in services, is named under Article V of the General Agreement on Trade in Services (GATS) as an "economic integration agreement". However, in practice, the term is now widely used to refer to agreements covering not only goods but also services and even investment.

== Legal aspects of free trade areas ==
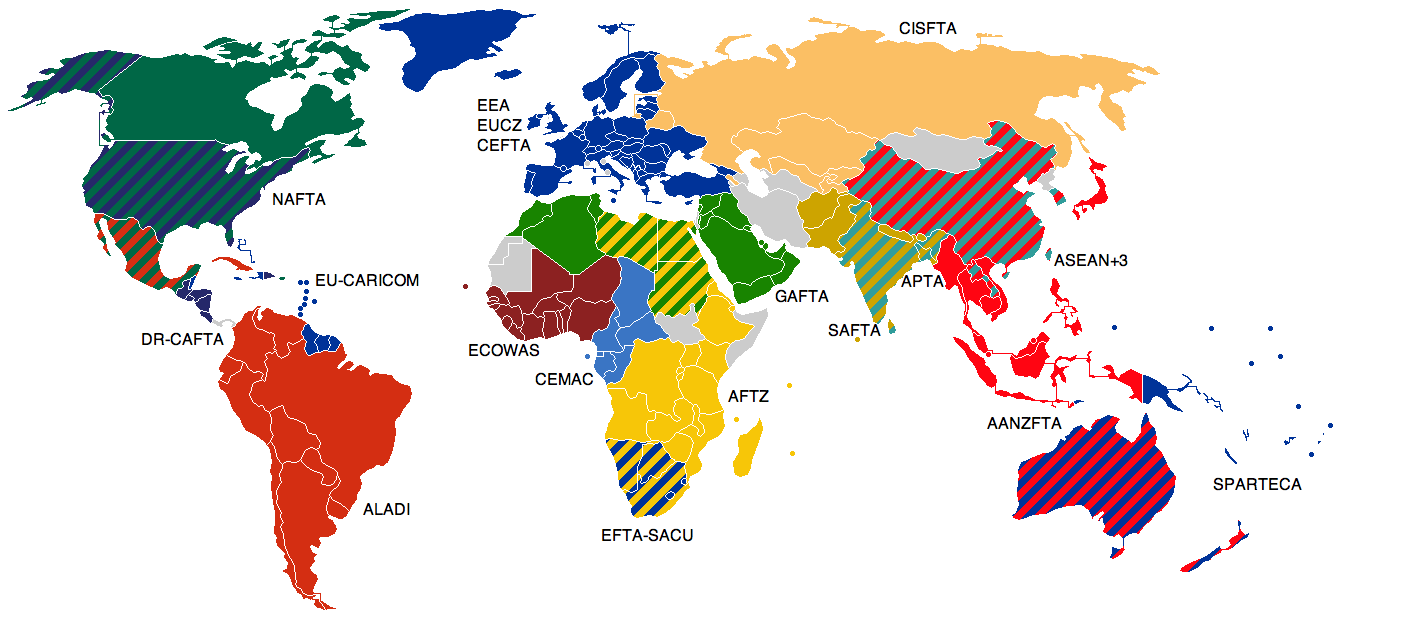
Free-trade zones

The formation of free trade areas is considered an exception to the most favored nation (MFN) principle in the World Trade Organization (WTO) because the preferences that parties to a free trade area exclusively grant each other go beyond their accession commitments. Although Article XXIV of the GATT allows WTO members to establish free trade areas or to adopt interim agreements necessary for the establishment thereof, there are several conditions with respect to free trade areas, or interim agreements leading to the formation of free trade areas.

Firstly, duties and other regulations maintained in each of the signatory parties to a free trade area, which are applicable at the time such free trade area is formed, to the trade with non-parties to such free trade area shall not be higher or more restrictive than the corresponding duties and other regulations existing in the same signatory parties prior to the formation of the free trade area. In other words, the establishment of a free trade area to grant preferential treatment among its member is legitimate under WTO law, but the parties to a free trade area are not permitted to treat non-parties less favorably than before the area was established. A second requirement stipulated by Article XXIV is that tariffs and other barriers to trade must be eliminated to substantially all the trade within the free trade area.

Free trade agreements forming free trade areas generally lie outside the realm of the multilateral trading system. However, WTO members must notify to the Secretariat when they conclude new free trade agreements and in principle the texts of free trade agreements are subject to review under the Committee on Regional Trade Agreements. Although a dispute arising within free trade areas is not subject to litigation at the WTO's Dispute Settlement Body, "there is no guarantee that WTO panels will abide by them and decline to exercise jurisdiction in a given case".

== Economic aspects of free trade areas ==
Trade diversion and trade creation

In general, trade diversion means that a free trade area would divert trade away from more efficient suppliers outside the area towards less efficient ones within the areas. Whereas, trade creation implies that a free trade area creates trade which may not have otherwise existed. In all cases trade creation will raise a country's national welfare.

Both trade creation and trade diversion are crucial effects found upon the establishment of a free trade area. Trade creation will cause consumption to shift from a high-cost producer to a low-cost one, and trade will thus expand. In contrast, trade diversion will lead to trade shifting from a lower-cost producer outside the area to a higher-cost one inside the area. Such a shift will not benefit consumers within the free trade area as they are deprived the opportunity to purchase cheaper imported goods. However, economists find that trade diversion does not always harm aggregate national welfare: it can even improve aggregate national welfare if the volume of diverted trade is small.

Free trade areas as public goods

Economists have made attempts to evaluate the extent to which free trade areas can be considered public goods. They firstly address one key element of free trade areas, which is the system of embedded tribunals which act as arbitrators in international trade disputes. This system as a force of clarification for existing statutes and international economic policies is affirmed within the trade treaties.

The second way in which free trade areas are considered public goods is tied to the evolving trend of them becoming "deeper". The depth of a free trade area refers to the added types of structural policies that it covers. While older trade deals are deemed "shallower" as they cover fewer areas (such as tariffs and quotas), more recently concluded agreements address a number of other fields, from services to e-commerce and data localization. Since transactions among parties to a free trade area are relatively cheaper as compared to those with non-parties, free trade areas are conventionally found to be excludable. Now that deep trade deals will enhance regulatory harmonization and increase trade flows with non-parties, thus reduce the excludability of FTA benefits, new generation free trade areas are obtaining essential characteristics of public goods.

== Qualifying for preferences under a free trade area ==
Unlike a customs union, parties to a free trade area do not maintain common external tariffs, which means they apply different customs duties, as well as other policies with respect to non-members. This feature creates the possibility of non-parties may free riding preferences under a free trade area by penetrating the market with the lowest external tariffs. Such risk necessitates the introduction of rules to determine originating goods eligible for preferences under a free trade area, a need that does not arise upon the formation of a customs union. Basically, there is a requirement for a minimum extent of processing that results in "substantial transformation" to the goods so that they can be considered originating. By defining which goods are originating in the PTA, preferential rules of origin distinguish between originating and non-originating goods: only the former will be entitled to preferential tariffs scheduled by the free trade area, the latter must pay MFN import duties.

It is noted that in qualifying for origin criteria, there is a differential treatment between inputs originating within and outside a free trade area. Normally inputs originating in one FTA party will be considered as originating in the other party if they are incorporated in the manufacturing process in that other party. Sometimes, production costs arising in one party is also considered as that arising in another party. In preferential rules of origin, such differential treatment is normally provided for in the cumulation or accumulation provision. Such clause further explains the trade creation and trade diversion effects of a free trade area mentioned above, because a party to a free trade area has the incentive to use inputs originating in another party so that their products may qualify for originating status.

== Databases on free trade areas ==
Since there are hundreds of free trade areas currently in force and being negotiated (about 800 according to ITC's Rules of Origin Facilitator, counting also non-reciprocal trade arrangements), it is important for businesses and policy-makers to keep track of their status. There are a number of depositories of free trade agreements available either at national, regional or international levels. Some significant ones include the database on Latin American free trade agreements constructed by the Latin American Integration Association (ALADI), the database maintained by the Asian Regional Integration Center (ARIC) providing information agreements of Asian countries, and the portal on the European Union's free trade negotiations and agreements.

At the international level, there are two important free access databases developed by international organizations for policy-makers and businesses:

WTO's Regional Trade Agreements Information System

As WTO members are obliged to notify to the Secretariat their free trade agreements, this database is constructed based on the most official source of information on free trade agreements (referred to as regional trade agreements in the WTO language). The database allows users to seek information on trade agreements notified to the WTO by country or by topic (goods, services or goods and services). This database provides users with an updated list of all agreements in force, however, those not notified to the WTO may be missing. It also displays reports, tables and graphs containing statistics on these agreements, and particularly preferential tariff analysis.

ITC's Market Access Map

The Market Access Map was developed by the International Trade Centre (ITC) with the objectives to facilitate businesses, governments and researchers in market access issues. The database, visible via the online tool Market Access Map, includes information on tariff and non-tariff barriers in all active trade agreements, not limited to those officially notified to the WTO. It also documents data on non-preferential trade agreements (for instance, Generalized System of Preferences schemes). Up until 2019, Market Access Map has provided downloadable links to texts agreements and their rules of origin. The new version of Market Access Map forthcoming this year will provide direct web links to relevant agreement pages and connect itself to other ITC's tools, particularly the Rules of Origin Facilitator. It is expected to become a versatile tool which assists enterprises in understanding free trade agreements and qualifying for origin requirements under these agreements.

== See also ==
- Free trade
- International trade
- Rules of origin
- Customs union
- Open Balkan
- Craiovia Group
- CEFTA
- List of bilateral free trade agreements
- List of multilateral free trade agreements
