= Economic and monetary union =

Trade bloc with a common tariff and currency

An economic and monetary union (EMU) is a type of trade bloc that features a combination of a common market, customs union, and monetary union. Established via a trade pact, an EMU constitutes the sixth of seven stages in the process of economic integration. An EMU agreement usually combines a customs union with a common market. A typical EMU establishes free trade and a common external tariff throughout its jurisdiction. It is also designed to protect freedom in the movement of goods, services, and people. This arrangement is distinct from a monetary union (e.g., the Latin Monetary Union), which does not usually involve a common market. As with the economic and monetary union established among the 27 member states of the European Union (EU), an EMU may affect different parts of its jurisdiction in different ways. Some areas are subject to separate customs regulations from other areas subject to the EMU. These various arrangements may be established in a formal agreement, or they may exist on a de facto basis. For example, not all EU member states use the Euro established by its currency union, and not all EU member states are part of the Schengen Area. Some EU members participate in both unions.

Territories of the United States, Australian External Territories and New Zealand territories each share a currency and, for the most part, the market of their respective mainland states. However, they are generally not part of the same customs territories.

== History ==
Several countries initially attempted to form an EMU at the Hague Summit in 1969. Afterward, a "draft plan" was announced. During this time, the main member presiding over this decision was Pierre Werner, Prime Minister of Luxembourg. The decision to form the Economic and Monetary Union of the European Union (EMU) was accepted in December 1991, which later became part of the Maastricht Treaty (the Treaty on European Union).

== Processes in the European EMU ==
The EMU involves four main activities.

The first responsibility is to be in charge of implementing effective monetary policy for the euro area with price stability. There is a group of economists whose only role is studying how to improve the monetary policy while maintaining price stability. They conduct research, and their results are presented to the leaders of the EMU. Thereafter, the role of the leaders is to find a suitable way to implement the economists' work into their country's policies. Maintaining price stability is a long-term goal for all states in the EU, due to the effects it might have on the Euro as a currency.

Secondly, the EMU must coordinate economic and fiscal policies in EU countries. They must find an equilibrium between the implementation of monetary and fiscal policies. They will advise countries to have greater coordination, even if that means having countries tightly coupled with looser monetary and tighter fiscal policy. Not coordinating the monetary market could result in risking an unpredictable situation. The EMU also deliberates on a mixed policy option, which has been shown to be beneficial in some empirical studies.

Thirdly, the EMU ensures that the single market runs smoothly. The member countries respect the decisions made by the EMU and ensure that their actions will be in favor of a stable market.

Finally, regulations of the EMU aid in supervising and monitoring financial institutions. There is an imperative need for all members of the EMU to act in unison. Therefore, the EMU has to have institutions supervising all the member states to protect the main aim of the EMU.

=== Roles of national governments ===
The economic roles of nations within the EMU are to:

- control fiscal policy that concerns government budgets
- control tax policies that determine how income is raised
- control structural policies that determine pension systems, labor, and capital-market regulations

== List of economic and monetary unions ==
- Economic and Monetary Union of the European Union (EMU) (1999/2002) with the Euro for the Eurozone members
- de facto the sovereign states in the OECS Eastern Caribbean Currency Union with the East Caribbean dollar in the CSME (2006)
- de facto Switzerland–Liechtenstein

=== Proposed ===
Community	Currency	Region	Target date	Notes
Economic and Monetary Community of Central Africa (CEMAC)	Central African CFA franc	Africa		Not yet functioning common market
West African Economic and Monetary Union (UEMOA)	West African CFA franc	Africa		Not yet functioning common market
Gulf Cooperation Council (GCC)	Khaleeji	Middle East		Possibly gold backed, but postponed due to the 2008 financial crisis.
East African Community (EAC)	East African shilling	Africa	2015	To be used by the future East African Federation
Caribbean Single Market and Economy (as part of the CARICOM)		Latin America /Caribbean	2015	To supplement the OECS Eastern Caribbean Currency Union
Southern African Customs Union (SACU)	South African Rand	Africa	2015	de facto for the CMA member when the SADC economic union is established
Southern African Development Community (SADC)	South African Rand (interim proposal)	Africa	2016	To supplement or succeed the CMA and Southern Africa Customs Union
South Asian Association for Regional Cooperation		South Asia	2016	
Union of South American Nations (UNASUR)	Latino	Latin America /Caribbean	2019	
Economic Community of Central African States (ECCAS)		Africa		To supplement the Economic and Monetary Community of Central Africa (CEMAC)
Economic Community of West African States (ECOWAS)		Africa	2020	To succeed UEMOA and WAMZ
African Economic Community		Africa	2028	See African Monetary Union
Union State of Russia and Belarus	Russian ruble	Europe		
Arab League	Arab Dinar	Arab states		Arab Dinar has been proposed ever since the creation of the Arab Monetary Fund, expected for serious plans of doing so, after the creation of the proposed Arab Union.
Eurasian Economic Union	Altyn	Eurasia	2025	Kazakhstani President Nursultan Nazarbayev had first proposed, in 2009, the creation of a common noncash currency called "yevraz" for the Eurasian Economic Community. It would have reportedly helped insulate the countries from the global economic crisis. In 2012, the idea of the new joint currency found support from Vladimir Putin and Dmitry Medvedev and by 2014 proposals were drafted in Eurasian Commission documents for the establishment of a Eurasian Central Bank and a common currency to be called the altyn which is to be introduced by 2025.

=== Previous EMUs ===
Stages of economic integration around the world (each country colored according to the most integrated multilateral agreement that it participates in): Economic and monetary union (ECCU/XCD, Eurozone/EUR, Switzerland–Liechtenstein/CHF) Economic union (CSME, EAEU, EU, GCC, Mercosur, SICA) Common market (European single market) Customs and monetary union (CEMAC/XAF, UEMOA/XOF) Customs union (CAN, EAC, EUCU, SACU) Multilateral free-trade area (AANZFTA, ASEAN, CEFTA, CISFTA, COMESA, CPTPP, EFTA, GAFTA, PAFTA, RCEP, SADCFTA, SAFTA, USMCA)

- Monetary union of the Belgium–Luxembourg Economic Union (1922–2002), superseded by the European EMU

== See also ==
- North American Union and North American Currency Union (Amero)
- Pacific Union (one proposal for Australian dollar)
