= List of multilateral free trade agreements =

Free trade agreements list

A multilateral free trade agreement is between several countries all treated equally, and creates a free trade area. Every customs union, common market, economic union, customs and monetary union and economic and monetary union is also a free trade area, and are not included below.

== World Trade Organization agreements ==
WTO members and observers: Members Members, dually represented by the European Union Observers Non-members

- General Agreement on Tariffs and Trade of 1994
  - Agreement on Agriculture
  - Agreement on the Application of Sanitary and Phytosanitary Measures
  - Agreement on Technical Barriers to Trade
  - Agreement on Trade Related Investment Measures
  - Agreement on Anti-Dumping
  - Agreement on Customs Valuation
  - Agreement on Preshipment Inspection
  - Agreement on Rules of Origin
  - Agreement on Import Licensing Procedures
  - Agreement on Subsidies and Countervailing Measures
  - Agreement on Safeguards
  - Agreement on Trade Facilitation
- General Agreement on Trade in Services
- Agreement on Trade-Related Aspects of Intellectual Property Rights
- Dispute Settlement Understanding
- Trade Policy Review Mechanism
- Agreement on Trade in Civil Aircraft
- Agreement on Government Procurement
- Arrangement regarding Bovine Meat, this agreement was terminated end 1997
- International Dairy Agreement, this agreement was terminated end 1997
- Information Technology Agreement
- Bali Package

== Active agreements ==
Stages of economic integration around the world (each country colored according to the most integrated multilateral agreement that it participates in): Economic and monetary union (ECCU/XCD, Eurozone/EUR, Switzerland–Liechtenstein/CHF) Economic union (CSME, EAEU, EU, GCC, Mercosur, SICA) Common market (European single market) Customs and monetary union (CEMAC/XAF, UEMOA/XOF) Customs union (CAN, EAC, EUCU, SACU) Multilateral free-trade area (AANZFTA, ASEAN, CEFTA, CISFTA, COMESA, CPTPP, EFTA, GAFTA, PAFTA, RCEP, SADCFTA, SAFTA, USMCA)

- European Union Customs Union (EUCU) - 1958
- European Free Trade Association (EFTA) - 1960
- Andean Community - 1969
- Asia-Pacific Trade Agreement (APTA) - 1975
- Southern African Development Community Free Trade Area (SADCFTA) - 1980
- Gulf Cooperation Council (GCC) - 1981
- Southern Common Market (MERCOSUR) - 1991
- ASEAN Free Trade Area (AFTA) - 1992
- Central European Free Trade Agreement (CEFTA) - 1992
- Organization of the Black Sea Economic Cooperation (BSEC) - 1992
- Central American Integration System (SICA) - 1993
- Common Market for Eastern and Southern Africa (COMESA) - 1994
- European Economic Area (EEA) - 1994
- G-3 Free Trade Agreement (G-3) - 1995
- International Grains Agreement - 1995
- Greater Arab Free Trade Area (GAFTA) - 1997
- Dominican Republic–Central America Free Trade Agreement (DR-CAFTA) - 2004
- South Asian Free Trade Area (SAFTA) - 2004
- East African Community (EAC) - 2005
- ASEAN–Australia–New Zealand Free Trade Area (AANZFTA) - 2010
- Pacific Alliance Free Trade Area (PAFTA) - 2012
- Comprehensive and Progressive Agreement for Trans-Pacific Partnership (CPTPP) - 2018
- African Continental Free Trade Area - 2019
- United States–Mexico–Canada Agreement (USMCA) - 2020
- Regional Comprehensive Economic Partnership (RCEP) - 2022

=== Post-Soviet States only ===
- Commonwealth of Independent States Agreement on the Establishment of a Free Trade Area - Multilateral Free Trade Area established on 24 November 1999 - multilateral free trade regime is in force among 10 countries as of 2023
- Eurasian Customs Union of the Eurasian Economic Union (EAEU) - 2010 as EurAsEC Customs Union of Russia, Kazakhstan and Belarus - 5 countries as of 2023
- Commonwealth of Independent States Free Trade Area (CISFTA) - 2011 - among 9 countries as of 2023
- GUAM Organization for Democracy and Economic Development (GUAM) FTA - unclear application, the WTO was notified in only 2017 - multilateral free trade regime among 4 countries (International Trade Centre says there is no free trade area in operation with distinct rules from an Agreement on Creation of CIS Free Trade Area, was signed on 15 April 1994 by 12 CIS countries.)

== Proposed agreements ==
- African Free Trade Zone (AFTZ) between SADC, EAC and COMESA
- Arab Maghreb Union (UMA)
- Association of Caribbean States (ACS)
- Bay of Bengal Initiative for Multi-Sectoral Technical and Economic Cooperation (BIMSTEC)
- Canada, Australia, New Zealand and United Kingdom Union (CANZUK)
- China–Japan–South Korea Free Trade Agreement
- Community of Sahel-Saharan States (CEN-SAD)
- Commonwealth Free Trade Area (CFTA)
- Economic Community of Central African States (ECCAS)
- Economic Community of West African States (ECOWAS)
- Economic Partnership Agreements (EU-ACP)
- Euro-Mediterranean free trade area (EU-MEFTA)
- Free Trade Area of the Americas (FTAA)
- Free Trade Area of the Asia Pacific (FTAAP), proposed APEC FTA
- Intergovernmental Authority on Development (IGAD)
- Open Balkan
- Pacific Agreement on Closer Economic Relations (PACER and PACER Plus)
- 2021 Pacific Island Countries Trade Agreement (PICTA)
- Shanghai Cooperation Organisation (SCO)
- Transatlantic Free Trade Area (TAFTA)
- Tripartite Free Trade Area (T-FTA)
- Union of South American Nations (USAN)
- Economic Cooperation Organization Trade Agreement (ECOTA)

== Obsolete agreements ==
- International Tin Agreement (1956–1985)
- Caribbean Free Trade Association (1968–1974)
- Association of Iron Ore Exporting Countries (1974–1999)
- International Bauxite Association (1974–1992)
- Multi Fibre Arrangement (1974–1994)
- North American Free Trade Agreement (1994–2020)

== Abandoned agreement ==
- Trans-Pacific Partnership (TPP) — signed 2016, signature withdrawn by the United States in 2017 thus rendering the agreement unratifiable.

== See also ==
- Free trade areas in Europe (with maps)
- List of bilateral free trade agreements
- List of country groupings
