= Customs and monetary union =

Multinational alliance with common trade and currency policies

A customs and monetary union is a type of trade bloc which is composed of a customs union and a currency union. The participant countries have both common external trade policy and share a single currency.

Customs and monetary union is established through trade pact.

== List of customs and monetary unions ==
Stages of economic integration around the World (each country colored according to the most integrated multilateral agreement that it participates in): Economic and monetary union (ECCU/XCD, Eurozone/EUR, Switzerland–Liechtenstein/CHF) Economic union (CSME, EAEU, EU, GCC, Mercosur, SICA) Common market (EEA–Switzerland) Customs and monetary union (CEMAC/XAF, UEMOA/XOF) Customs union (CAN, EAC, EUCU, SACU) Multilateral free-trade area (AANZFTA, ASEAN, CEFTA, CISFTA, COMESA, CPTPP, EFTA, GAFTA, PAFTA, RCEP, SADCFTA, SAFTA, USMCA)

- Economic and Monetary Union of the European Union (1999/2002) with the Euro for the Eurozone members
  - de facto San Marino – European Union
  - de facto Andorra – European Union
  - de facto Monaco – European Union
- de facto Switzerland–Liechtenstein
- de facto the OECS Eastern Caribbean Currency Union with the East Caribbean dollar in the CSME (2006)
- Economic and Monetary Community of Central Africa (CEMAC)
- West African Economic and Monetary Union (UEMOA)
- de facto the Common Monetary Area (CMA) in the Southern Africa Customs Union (SACU)

Note: Every economic and monetary union has also a customs and monetary union.

Additionally the autonomous and dependent territories, such as some of the EU member state special territories, are sometimes treated as separate customs territory from their mainland state or have varying arrangements of formal or de facto customs union, common market and currency union (or combinations thereof) with the mainland and in regards to third countries through the trade pacts signed by the mainland state.

=== Proposed ===
- 2012 East African Community (EAC)
- 2018 Common Market for Eastern and Southern Africa (COMESA)
- Economic Community of Central African States (ECCAS)
- Economic Community of West African States (ECOWAS)
- Gulf Cooperation Council
- 2023 African Economic Community (AEC)
