= Single market =

Type of trade bloc with most trade barriers removed

A single market, sometimes called common market or internal market, is a type of trade bloc in which most trade barriers have been removed (for goods) with some common policies on product regulation, and freedom of movement of the factors of production (capital and labour) and of enterprise and services. The goal is that the movement of capital, labour, goods, and services between the members is as easy as within them. The physical (borders), technical (standards) and fiscal (taxes) barriers among the member states are removed to the maximum extent possible. These barriers obstruct the freedom of movement of the four factors of production (goods, capital, services, workers).

A common market is usually referred to as the first stage towards the creation of a single market. It usually is built upon a free trade area with no tariffs for goods and relatively free movement of capital, workers and services, but not so advanced in reduction of other trade barriers.

A unified market is the last stage and ultimate goal of a single market. It requires the total free movement of goods and services, capital and people without regard to national boundaries.

== Integration phases ==
Stages of economic integration around the world (each country colored according to the most integrated multilateral agreement that it participates in): Economic and monetary union (ECCU/XCD, Eurozone/EUR, Switzerland–Liechtenstein/CHF) Economic union (CSME, EAEU, EU, GCC, Mercosur, SICA) Common market (European single market) Customs and monetary union (CEMAC/XAF, UEMOA/XOF) Customs union (CAN, EAC, EUCU, SACU) Multilateral free-trade area (AANZFTA, ASEAN, CEFTA, CISFTA, COMESA, CPTPP, EFTA, GAFTA, PAFTA, RCEP, SADCFTA, SAFTA, USMCA)

A common market allows for the free movement of capital and services but large amounts of trade barriers remain. It eliminates all quotas and tariffs – duties on imported goods – from trade in goods within it. However non-tariff barriers to trade remain, such as differences between the Member States' rules on product safety, packaging requirements and national administrative procedures. These prevent manufacturers from marketing the same goods in all member states. The objective of a common market is most often economic convergence and the creation of an integrated single market. It is sometimes considered as the first stage of a single market. The European Economic Community was the first large-scale example of a common market. (Note: Benelux, a customs union between Belgium, the Netherlands and Luxembourg that preceded the EEC, had many of the characteristics of a common market.)

A single market allows for people, goods, services and capital to move around a union as freely as they do within a single country – instead of being obstructed by national borders and barriers as they were in the past. Citizens can study, live, shop, work and retire in any member state. Consumers enjoy a vast array of products from all member states and businesses have unrestricted access to more consumers. A single market is commonly described as "frontier-free". However, several barriers remain such as differences in national tax systems, differences in parts of the services sector and different requirements for e-commerce. In addition separate national markets still exist for financial services, energy and transport. Laws concerning the recognition of professional qualifications also may not be fully harmonized. The Eurasian Economic Union, the Gulf Cooperation Council, CARICOM and the European Union are current examples of single markets, although the GCC's single market has been described as "malfunctioning" in 2014. The European Union is the only economic union whose objective is "completing the single market".

A completed, unified market usually refers to the complete removal of barriers and integration of the remaining national markets. Complete economic integration can be seen within many countries, whether in a single unitary state with a single set of economic rules, or among the members of a strong national federation. For example, the sovereign states of the United States do to some degree have different local economic regulations (e.g. licensing requirements for professionals, rules and pricing for utilities and insurance, consumer safety laws, environmental laws, minimum wage) and taxes, but are subordinate to the federal government on any matter of interstate commerce the national government chooses to assert itself. Movement of people and goods among the states is unrestricted and without tariffs.

== Benefits and costs ==
A single market has many benefits: with full freedom of movement for all the factors of production between the member countries, the factors of production become more efficiently allocated, further increasing productivity.

For both business within the market and consumers, a single market is a competitive environment, making the existence of monopolies more difficult. This means that inefficient companies will suffer a loss of market share and may have to close down. However, efficient firms can benefit from economies of scale, increased competitiveness and lower costs, as well as expecting profitability to increase as a result. This is true especially for companies selling goods and services easily distributed all around the countries of single market. In theory, consumers can benefit from the single market as the competitive environment might result in cheaper, more accessibly and higher quality products.

Single market can play a role in improving the prosperity of a nation. For example, the European single market contributed to an annual GDP growth of 2.2% p.a. between 1992 and 2006, increased job creation, and reduced unemployment.

However, transitioning to a single market can have a negative impact on some economic sectors due to increased international competition. Enterprises that would have previously enjoyed national market protection and national subsidies may struggle to survive against more efficient international competitors. Ultimately, if the enterprise fails to improve its organization and methods, it will fail. The consequence may be national unemployment or migration.

National participation into single market opens political debates, about skills loss through worker migration from less developed countries, and wage suppression in countries to which they migrate.

== List of common markets ==
Common market: Mercosur.

Every economic union and economic and monetary union includes a common market.

- European Single Market (European Economic Area – Switzerland)
- Central American Common Market (CACM)
- Single Economic Space of the Eurasian Economic Union (overlapping with the Common Economic Space of the Commonwealth of Independent States)
- Southern Common Market (Mercosur)

=== Partly launched ===
- Common Economic Space of the Commonwealth of Independent States (overlapping with the Single Economic Space of the Eurasian Economic Union)

=== Proposed ===
- ASEAN Economic Community (AEC) – established, but common market integration target is 2025
- East African Community (EAC)
- African Economic Community (AEC)
- (Caribbean Community) CARICOM Single Market and Economy (CSME) – Originally envisioned to be complete by 2008, it has since been delayed and is now envisioned to have free movement of people between willing member states by 2021.
- (Cooperation Council for the Arab States of the Gulf) Gulf Cooperation Council (GCC) – Not yet a common market, though integration is continuing
- Latin American Integration Association (ALADI)
- Commonwealth free trade area – proposed by politicians in Australia, Canada, New Zealand and the United Kingdom but never implemented
- Free Trade Area of the Americas – proposed trade bloc at the Summit of the Americas intended to be implemented across the Western Hemisphere (excluding Cuba) by 2005

== See also ==
- Four Economic Freedoms – Free movement of goods, services, capital and labour
- Regional integration – International cooperation within a region of the world
- Multi-speed integration – Form of regional integration
