= COMTEL Project =

COMTEL Project was a program of the Common Market for Eastern and Southern Africa (COMESA) aimed at creating a regional telecommunications infrastructure for the 21 member states via a fiber backbone. This would have helped member states to get rid of satellite links they used for their transit traffic between themselves going via Europe, America and Asia.

== Implementation ==
COMESA had allegedly entered into an agreement with the Anderberg-Ericsson Consortium of Mauritus as a strategic equity partner; however, it was subsequently reported that Ericsson would not participate as an equity partner. On February 26, 2007, it was announced that the COMTEL Project had encountered delays, leading to individual member countries developing their own regional telecommunication infrastructures. After failing to take-off following 20 years of trial, the project was officially scrapped in 2021 following a meeting of the ICT ministers of COMESA member countries.
