= African Free Trade Zone =

Free trade zone

- Map of Africa indicating AFTZ members: Member states
- Type: Trade bloc
- Membership: 26 member states
- Establishment: Agreement
  - Signed: 2008

The African Free Trade Zone (AFTZ) is a free trade zone announced at the EAC-SADC-COMESA Summit on 22 October 2008 by the heads of Southern African Development Community (SADC), the Common Market for Eastern and Southern Africa (COMESA) and the East African Community (EAC). The African Free Trade Zone is also referred to as the African Free Trade Area in some official documents and press releases.

In May 2012 the idea was extended to also include ECOWAS, ECCAS and AMU.

In June 2015, at the African Union Summit in South Africa, negotiations were launched to create a Continental Free Trade Area (CFTA) with all 55 African Union states by 2017.

== Signing ==
The leaders of the three AFTZ trading blocks, COMESA, EAC, and SADC, announced the agreement, with the aim of creating a single free trade zone to be named the African Free Trade Zone, consisting of 26 countries with a GDP of an estimated US$624bn (£382.9bn). It was hoped that the African Free Trade Zone agreement would ease access to markets within the AFTZ zone and end problems due to several of the member countries in the AFTZ belonging to multiple regional groups.

The African Free Trade Zone announced at the EAC-SADC-COMESA Summit (also known the AFTZ Summit and Tripartite Summit) effectively is the realization of a dream more than a hundred years in the making, a trade zone spanning the length of African continent from Cape to Cairo, from North African Egypt all the way to the southernmost tip of Africa in South Africa (Cape Town). The Cape to Cairo dream was envisioned by Cecil Rhodes and other British imperialists in the 1890s and was expressed in different contexts and versions including, but not limited to, the following ideals: Cape to Cairo Road, Cape to Cairo Railway, Cape to Cairo Telegraph, and Cape to Cairo Trade Union.

While other powers, notably Germany and Portugal had colonies or spheres of influence in the Cape to Cairo trade zone contemplated, the primary benefactor of the Cape to Cairo union would have been Great Britain and the British Empire. The biggest difference in the idea of the original Cape to Cairo zone and its current incarnation is that the African Free Trade Zone is the creation of African Countries for the mutual benefit and development of the AFTZ member countries, their peoples and the whole of continent of Africa rather than a trade zone for the benefit of Great Britain. Ultimately, it is hoped the AFTZ would serve as a key building block to African Unity and the realization of a united Africa under the auspices of the African Union.

Another important difference between the original and current ideal is that the AFTZ encompasses an area greater than the one even Cecil Rhodes could have imagine. The original Cape to Cairo idea in Cecil Rhodes' time and now under the AFTZ is a free trade zone spanning the whole continent from Cape Town in South Africa to Cairo in Egypt. Cecil Rhodes' Cape to Cairo would have involved at most a dozen countries. The current rendition of the Cape to Cairo zone actualized by the AFTZ encompasses most of Africa, almost half of the countries (26 out of 54), more than half of the production, trade, population, land mass and resources. If it actualizes its potential and becomes a truly integrated economic union, the AFTZ could actually rival any other economic union with its vast natural resources, huge markets, young population, and great technical know-how (mostly courtesy of SADC in general and the Republic of South Africa in particular).

In addition to eliminating duplicative membership and the problem of member states also participating in other regional economic cooperation schemes and regional political and security cooperation schemes that may compete with or undermine each other, the African Free Trade Zone further aims to strengthen the AFTZ block's bargaining power when negotiating international deals.

Analysts believe that the African Free Trade Zone agreement will help intra-regional trade and boost growth.

The AFTZ is considered a major step in the implementation of the AEC, an organization of African Union states establishing grounds for mutual economic development among the majority of African states. The stated goals of the AEC organization include the creation of free trade areas, customs unions, a single market, a central bank, and a common currency thus establishing an economic and monetary union for the African Union.

== The trade blocs ==
The image above contains clickable links Euler diagram showing the relationships among various multinational African entities

The three trade blocs that agreed to and make up the AFTZ, the COMESA, the EAC and the SADC, are already well-established in their own right and cover varying swathes of land, economic systems, political systems and a varied number of peoples (which includes Arabs in the North, multi-racial peoples in the East and South, including significant numbers of Africans of European descent, Asian Africans, including Indians, Chinese and other Asian groups as well as Colored Africans—mixed race Africans numbering millions in South Africa). Many of the membership of the three AFTZ member trade blocks overlap with several countries being a member of more than one of the AFTZ member trade blocks as well as a member of other alliances within and without the three trade blocks.

== Historic significance of the AFTZ ==
The EAC-SADC-COMESA Summit is considered historic because for the first time, since the birth of the African Union, several key building blocks of the EAC have met on how to integrate territories and moving towards deepening and widening integration within the overall Abuja Treaty for the establishment of the AEC. Further, for the first time a truly transcontinental union came into being, ranging from the north to the south of the continent. The AFTZ (EAC, COMESA and SADC) currently have a combined population of 527 million and combined GDP of US$625 billion. In size and capacity, the AFTZ rivals most trade blocks.

The SADC is the largest of the AFTZ member trade blocks and covers a population of some 248 million people and a zone whose cumulative GDP is $379bn in 2006.

COMESA was established in 1994 as a replacement for the Preferential Trade Area. It includes 20 nations, with a combined GDP of US$286.7bn in 2006. Among its members are Zimbabwe, Zambia, Uganda and Sudan.

The EAC, the smallest of the member trade blocks in terms of GDP, had a GDP of US$46.6bn in 2006.

== Member states ==
Map showing the member states of the African Free Trade Zone (AFTZ)

The EAC-SADC-COMESA's African Free Trade Zone membership includes the following countries:

- Angola
- Botswana
- Burundi
- Comoros
- Djibouti
- Democratic Republic of Congo
- Egypt
- Eritrea
- Ethiopia
- Kenya
- Lesotho
- Libya
- Madagascar
- Malawi
- Mauritius
- Mozambique
- Namibia
- Rwanda
- Tanzania
- Seychelles
- Swaziland
- South Africa
- Sudan
- Uganda
- Zambia
- Zimbabwe

=== AFTZ Summit presidents ===
The AFTZ Summit, also referred to as the Tripartite Summit was opened and attended by six African heads of state representing the member trade groups. Attending the opening session on Wednesday were presidents Yoweri Museveni of Uganda, Paul Kagame of Rwanda, Robert Mugabe of Zimbabwe, Kgalema Motlanthe of South Africa, Jakaya Kikwete of Tanzania and Kenya's Mwai Kibaki.

=== Attendance of the AFTZ Tripartite Summit ===
The AFTZ Tripartite Summit was attended by the following Heads of State and Government:

- Yoweri Kaguta Museveni, President of the Republic of Uganda
- Mwai Kibaki, President of the Republic of Kenya
- Kgalema Motlanthe, President of the Republic of South Africa
- Jakaya Mrisho Kikwete, President of the United Republic of Tanzania
- Paul Kagame, President of the Republic of Rwanda
- Robert Gabriel Mugabe, President of the Republic of Zimbabwe
- Pakalitha Mosisili, Prime Minister of the Kingdom of Lesotho
- Gabriel Ntisezerana, Second Vice President of the Republic of Burundi
- Sibusiso Barnabas Dlamini, Prime Minister of the Kingdom of Swaziland.

The following Plenipotentiaries represented the Heads of State and Government of the following countries:

- Olivier Kamitatu Etshou, Minister of Planning, Democratic Republic of Congo;
- Rifki Abdoulkader Bamakhrama Minister of Trade, and Industry, Republic of Djibouti;
- Osman Mohamed, Minister of Economic Development, Arab Republic of Egypt
- Ali Abd Alazziz Alsawi, Secretary General of Economy, Trade and Investment, Great Socialist People's Libyan Arab Jamahiriya
- Joyce Banda, Minister of Foreign Affairs, Republic of Malawi
- Arvind Boolell, Minister of Foreign Affairs, Regional Integration and International Trade, Republic of Mauritius;
- Antonion Fernando, Minister of Trade and Industry, Republic of Mozambique
- Bradford Machila, Minister of Lands and Special Representative of His Honour the Vice President and Acting President of the Republic of Zambia
- Joaquim Duarte da Costa David, Minister of Industry Republic of Angola
- Neo D. Moroka, Minister of Trade and Industry of the Republic of Botswana
- Patrick Pillay, Minister of Foreign Affairs of the Republic of Seychelles
- Hassan Ibrahim Gadkarim, Ambassador of the Republic of Sudan to Republic of Uganda, Republic of Rwanda and Republic of Burundi
- Wilfried I. Emvula, Ambassador and Permanent Delegate to the African Union and the Economic Commission of Africa, Republic of Namibia
- Salih Omar Abdu, Ambassador of the State of Eritrea to Republic of Kenya, Republic of Uganda and United Republic of Tanzania
- Denis Andriamandroso, Ambassador of the Republic of Madagascar to the Republic of South Africa
- Ambassador Clifford Sibusiso Mamba, Permanent Secretary, Ministry of Foreign Affairs and Trade, Kingdom of Swaziland

The following officials represented their organisations at the Tripartite Summit:

- Erastus J.O. Mwencha, Vice Chairperson, African Union Commission;
- Lalla Ben Barka; Deputy Executive Secretary, UNECA;
- Mtchera J. Chirwa, African Development Bank;
- Kasaija Apuuli, IGAD; and Ambassador Liberata Mulamula, Executive Secretary, International Conference on the Great Lakes

Also in attendance were chief executive Officers of the

- COMESA Mr. Sindiso Ngwenya, Secretary General of COMESA
- EAC Amb. Juma Mwapachu
- SADC Dr. Tomaz Augusto Salomao, Executive Secretary, SADC.

=== SA President on AFTZ ===
President Kgalema Motlanthe of South Africa speaking in Kampala, Uganda, at a meeting of Africa's three regional economic communities, argues that the AFTZ is an important step in the integration of African economies and the eventually union of the continent. With the great uncertainty in the global economy following the food and energy price increases and, more recently, the upheavals in the financial markets, Motlanthe suggested that the advent of the AFTZ could not have been any more timely.

While African and other developing countries had marginal influence over the decisions that had brought the international financial system to the brink of collapse, unjustifiably, the poor and vulnerable of these countries would bear the brunt of the economic downturn.

"It is imperative that effective remedial measures are developed to mitigate the negative impact of the crises, and developing countries must now be included in the governance of international financial institutions," Motlanthe said.

At the same time, it was necessary to work towards a more equitable global trade regime that put the concerns of developing countries, including African countries, at its centre.

He also urged that the Common Market for Eastern and Southern Africa (Comesa), the Eastern African Community (EAC), and Southern African Development Community (SADC), increase co-operation towards greater integration.

"The process we embark upon today marks a historic step towards fulfilling our obligations under the African Union and the Abuja Treaty framework of continental integration, which recognises that Regional Economic Communities are the building-blocks for the African Economic Community."

The time had come for Comesa, EAC and SADC to bring together their respective regional integration programmes to further enlarge their markets, unlock productive potential, increase the levels of intra-Africa trade, and enhance developmental prospects.

"As a next step in expanding regional markets in Africa, the process we launch today will place us in a stronger position to respond effectively to intensifying global economic competition and will begin to overcome the challenges posed by multiple memberships of regional organisations.

"Let us therefore take the necessary decisions to work systematically and with determination to establish a single free trade area that will weld together our three regions into one,"
