= United Kingdom–Crown Dependencies Customs Union =

Free trade area

- The British Islands on a map: United Kingdom Crown Dependencies
- Type: Customs union
- Members: List: United Kingdom; Crown Dependencies; Jersey; Guernsey; Isle of Man
- Establishment: 2020

Area
  - Total: 243,263 (Note: This total is a combined area all of the members) km^{2} (93,924 sq mi) (Unranked)

Population
  - Estimate: 69,478,286 (Note: this includes the United Kingdom, Channel Islands and the Isle of Man)
- GDP (PPP): estimate
  - Total: £2,288,612 trillion ($3,185,015 trillion) (Note: This is the combined total of all members (this citation contains links to all members GDP (PPP))
- Currency: Pound sterling (Note: Local issue: Guernsey pound, Jersey pound & Manx pound) (de facto currency union)

The United Kingdom–Crown Dependencies Customs Union (UK-CD Customs Union) or customs arrangements with the Crown Dependencies, is a customs union that covers the British Islands, comprising the United Kingdom and its Crown Dependencies. (Note: Although each of the dependencies signed an individual agreement with the UK, these agreements include provision for the inclusion of the other dependencies creating a single customs area between the members.)

On 1 January 2021, the United Kingdom extended its membership of the World Trade Organization (WTO) to the Channel Islands.

The United Kingdom Government represents the interests of the UK and Crown Dependencies in negotiations. Trade deals that applied to the Crown Dependencies before Brexit continued to apply after due to the United Kingdom’s continuity agreements, new agreement are extendable to the Crown Dependencies by request and agreement of other party/parties to the trade agreement.

== History ==
Prior to the UK's exit from the EU, trade between the UK and Crown Dependencies was governed by protocol 3 of the UK's EU accession treaty.

On 26 November 2018, the UK signed customs agreements with each of the Crown Dependencies to allow free trade to continue to flow across between all the parties by creating a single UK–Crown Dependencies Customs Union.

On 29 December 2020, the UK–Crown Dependencies Customs Agreements took effect and officially created a customs union between the UK and Crown Dependencies.

Though Northern Ireland is considered an integral part of the United Kingdom and is not part of the European Union, to maintain a peaceful resolution of the Northern Ireland conflict, it has an open border with the Republic of Ireland, which is part of the European Union single market. The Northern Ireland Protocol, a protocol to the Brexit withdrawal agreement, regulates inter-island trade to support this arrangement. Internal shipments from Great Britain to Northern Ireland are regulated as imports to the EU, but shipments from Northern Ireland can enter the rest of UK customs union barrier-free.

On 26 September 2023, the UK Treasury made The Customs (Northern Ireland) (EU Exit) (Amendment) Regulations 2023. This is a statutory instrument (2023 No. 958) The new regulations updated the UK's customs duty rules for goods moving between Great Britain and Northern Ireland and created a wider definition to determine whether food is at risk of entering the EU.

== Objectives ==
The customs agreements:

- remove customs duties between members
- prohibit quantitive restrictions (Note: Quantitative restrictions Article XI of the GATT 1994 is the main provision regulating quantitative restrictions (QRs). The scope of this provision includes all prohibitions or restrictions other than tariffs or other taxes applied or maintained by a WTO Member on the importation or exportation of goods, which can be made effective through quotas, import or export licensing procedures, or other measures. Although Article XI of the GATT provides for the general elimination of quantitative restrictions, they are allowed in certain specific circumstances. Members' QR notifications seek to provide transparency on these measures, including on its WTO justification.)
- create a common external tariff
- create a shared safety and security zone
- create a joint customs committee
- create a single customs area.

These agreements also state that they may be terminated at any time by mutual agreement.

== Provisions ==
=== Common Transit Convention ===
On 29 December 2020, the United Kingdom became an independent member of Common Transit Convention; this has been extended to the crown dependencies through the UK–Crown Dependencies customs union and is used as the basis for common transit between members.

=== Customs alignment ===
Paragraphs 10 to 12 provide that members of the customs union will align with the UK in areas of customs laws, rules and procedures.

=== Joint UK-CD Customs Committee ===
The customs agreements created a joint customs committee (UK-CD Customs Committee). This committee will meet at least once a year and will act as a forum for:

- Exchanging views on common interests regarding the agreements
- Reviewing the operation of the agreements
- Seeking appropriate way and methods to avoid problems occurring in regard to areas covered in the agreements
- Mediation should problems occur regarding areas covered in the agreements.

=== External Customs Tariffs ===
In 2020 the UK government passed the Customs (Tariff Quotas)(EU Exit) Regulations 2020. The purpose of this regulation is to update definitions in customs legislation.

== Customs arrangements ==
The customs arrangements establishing the United Kingdom–Crown Dependencies Customs Union were concluded separately with each Crown Dependency.

For Jersey, the Arrangement between the Government of the United Kingdom of Great Britain and Northern Ireland and the government of Jersey concerning the establishment and operation of the United Kingdom–Crown Dependencies Customs Union was given effect in the United Kingdom by the Crown Dependencies Customs Union (Jersey) (EU Exit) Order 2019 and in Jersey by the EU Legislation (Customs Union, Import and Export Control) (Jersey) Regulations 2018.

For Guernsey, the Arrangement between the Government of the United Kingdom of Great Britain and Northern Ireland and the government of Guernsey concerning the establishment and operation of the United Kingdom–Crown Dependencies Customs Union was given effect in the United Kingdom by the Crown Dependencies Customs Union (Guernsey) (EU Exit) Order 2019 and in Guernsey by the Customs Excise (Import)(Customs Declaration) Regulations 2020.

For the Isle of Man, the Arrangement between the governments of the United Kingdom and the Isle of Man further amending the agreement between those governments on customs and excise and associated matters dated 15 October 1979 was given effect in United Kingdom by the The Crown Dependencies Customs Union (Isle of Man) (EU Exit) Order 2019 and in the Isle of Man by the Taxation (Cross-border Trade) Act 2018 (Application) Order 2019 which amends the long-standing Customs and Excise Management Act 1979.

== See also ==
- Accession of the United Kingdom to CPTPP
- Common Travel Area
- Free trade agreements of the United Kingdom
- Local border traffic
- United Kingdom Internal Market Act 2020
- Common Purse Agreement
