= Customs territory =

Geographic territory with uniform customs regulations

A customs territory is a territory with uniform customs regulations and there are no internal customs or similar taxes within the territory. Customs territories may fall into several types:

- A sovereign state, including a federation
- A trade bloc that has a customs union
- An autonomous or dependent territory that is granted by the sovereign government some degree of independence in foreign trade and customs policy.

There are also some unregulated lands (usually uninhabited) not part of any customs territory.

As of 2010, most customs unions rarely operate as a single entity and are represented in relations with other customs territories either jointly by their member state governments and the union institutions or by only the member states. Thus, in practice, they rarely appear as a single customs territory and instead they operate as a multiple separate customs territories that have the same or similar customs tariffs. The European Union (EU) is the only trade bloc in which the union institutions have exclusive competence over the common external tariff and thus sign and ratify agreements with foreign states without direct participation of the EU member states. The EU is also the only trade bloc member of the World Trade Organization, but the EU member states also continue their own separate memberships, as not all of the WTO issues fall within the scope of exclusive EU competences.

The governing organs (government or other responsible administrative entity for the states and territories, secretariat or similar international organization body for the trade blocs) of the customs territories negotiate and sign trade agreements. In some cases the negotiations are conducted by a trade bloc secretariat, but the actual agreement is signed by the member states of the trade bloc. It is also possible for a group of customs territories, that do not form a customs union (regardless if they cooperate as a different type of trade bloc), to negotiate trade agreements together and to sign the resulting agreement individually (for example, the European Free Trade Association).

A customs territory usually has inspection stations at its borders. There can also be border checks between two parts of the same customs territory. For example, there are border checks between the Schengen Area portions of the EU customs territory and those portions in the Common Travel Area formed by the United Kingdom, Crown Dependencies, and Ireland. Another example is the border checks between Israel and the Palestinian Territories, which are in a customs union. The European Union example is particularly complicated, since it also has different boundaries for EU VAT area, the EU excise duty area, the area where EU law applies, and the area considered by the EU statistics agency.

A customs territory is a fundamental concept in international trade law, distinct from political sovereignty. It is authoritatively defined in the General Agreement on Tariffs and Trade (GATT) 1994 as "any territory with respect to which separate tariffs or other regulations of commerce are maintained for a substantial part of the trade of such territory with other territories". This definition establishes two core principles: first, that a customs territory is a defined geographical area capable of conducting its own commercial policy, and second, that this policy autonomy is demonstrated through its own tariff schedules and trade regulations.

== List of customs territories ==
=== Unions ===
Countries which are members of a customs union, which in some cases may be considered a single customs territory:

- Andean Community of Nations (CAN)
  - Bolivia
  - Colombia
  - Ecuador
  - Peru
- Caribbean Community (CARICOM)
  - Antigua and Barbuda
  - Barbados
  - Belize
  - Dominica
  - Grenada
  - Guyana
  - Jamaica
  - Montserrat
  - Saint Kitts and Nevis
  - Saint Lucia
  - Saint Vincent and the Grenadines
  - Suriname
  - Trinidad and Tobago
  - Other CARICOM member states, The Bahamas and Haiti are not a part of the customs union arrangement although Haiti is in the process of acceding.
- East African Community (EAC)
  - Burundi
  - Kenya
  - Rwanda
  - Tanzania
  - Uganda
- Eurasian Customs Union
  - Armenia
  - Belarus
  - Kazakhstan
  - Kyrgyzstan
  - Russia
  - Russia unilaterally negotiated a free trade agreement (excluding sugar, alcohol, and tobacco) with Abkhazia and South Ossetia. These areas are claimed by Georgia, which is not a member of the customs union.
- European Union Customs Union (internal border checks) - includes the territory of European Union member countries, excepting many areas outside of continental Europe, and some exclaves and border areas. (See Special member state territories and the European Union for a detailed list.) Various treaties extend the EU customs area to include the non-EU states of:
  - Akrotiri and Dhekelia
  - Andorra (excluding agricultural produce)
  - Monaco
  - San Marino
  - Turkey (excluding agricultural produce)
- Israel — Palestinian Authority customs union (internal border checks)
- Southern Common Market (MERCOSUR)
  - Argentina
  - Brazil
  - Paraguay
  - Uruguay
  - Venezuela
  - Bolivia
- Southern African Customs Union (SACU)
  - Botswana
  - Eswatini
  - Lesotho
  - Namibia
  - South Africa
- Switzerland — Liechtenstein — Büsingen am Hochrhein customs union (no external border checks)
- United Kingdom–Crown Dependencies Customs Union
  - Isle of Man
  - Guernsey
  - Jersey
  - United Kingdom

=== Exclusions for external territories ===
Countries with external territories variously put them inside or outside the main domestic customs area.

==== Australia ====
External territories of Australia are outside its main customs zone, but the inhabited ones get preferential tariff treatment.

==== China ====
The following customs territories are outside the customs territory of the People's Republic of China:

- Special Administrative Region of the People's Republic of China
  - Hong Kong, autonomous territory of PR China
  - Macau, autonomous territory of PR China
- Hainan

==== Europe ====
Treatment of special territories of members of the European Economic Area varies.

==== New Zealand ====
Tokelau is in a separate customs zone from the North and South Islands of New Zealand, as are the freely associated states of Niue and the Cook Islands.

==== United Kingdom ====
Though Northern Ireland is considered an integral part of the United Kingdom and is not part of the European Union, to maintain a peaceful resolution of the Northern Ireland Conflict, it has an open border with the Republic of Ireland, which is part of the European Union customs union. Under the Northern Ireland Protocol, internal shipments from Great Britain to Northern Ireland are regulated as imports to the EU, but shipments from Northern Ireland can enter the rest of UK customs union barrier-free.

==== United States ====
The customs territory of the United States includes the fifty states, the District of Columbia, and U.S Commonwealth of Puerto Rico. The following dependent United States territories are outside the customs territory and most administer customs separately:

- American Samoa - Government of American Samoa
- Guam - Government of Guam
- Northern Mariana Islands - Government of the Commonwealth of the Northern Mariana Islands
- United States Minor Outlying Islands
  - Wake Island - Department of the Air Force General Counsel
  - Midway Islands - Department of the Navy
  - Johnston Atoll - none
  - (Other islands are uninhabited, although Palmyra Atoll, administered by the Fish and Wildlife Service, is permanently staffed and has several private land parcels. It has no customs administration or duties.)
- US Virgin Islands - Federal rules as modified by the Virgin Islands legislature, but implemented by U.S. Customs and Border Protection

=== Taiwan ===
Taiwan is officially titled as Separate Customs Territory of Taiwan, Penghu, Kinmen, and Matsu or Chinese Taipei in the WTO.

== See also ==
- List of free economic zones
- Economic integration
- Member states of the World Customs Organization
