= Economic union =

Trading bloc with no internal barriers and common policies on regulation and trade

An economic union is a type of trade bloc which is composed of a common market with a customs union. The participant countries have both common policies on product regulation, freedom of movement of goods, services and the factors of production (capital and labour) as well as a common external trade policy. When an economic union involves unifying currency, it becomes an economic and monetary union.

The purposes for establishing an economic union normally include increasing economic efficiency and establishing closer political and cultural ties between the member countries.

Economic union is established through trade pact.

== List of economic unions ==
Stages of economic integration around the World (each country colored according to the most integrated multilateral agreement that it participates in): Economic and monetary union (ECCU/XCD, Eurozone/EUR, Switzerland–Liechtenstein/CHF) Economic union (CSME, EAEU, EU, GCC, Mercosur, SICA) Common market (EEA–Switzerland) Customs and monetary union (CEMAC/XAF, UEMOA/XOF) Customs union (CAN, EAC, EUCU, SACU) Multilateral free-trade area (AANZFTA, ASEAN, CEFTA, CISFTA, COMESA, CPTPP, EFTA, GAFTA, PAFTA, RCEP, SADCFTA, SAFTA, USMCA)

- CARICOM Single Market and Economy
- Central American Common Market - Common market since 1960, customs union since 2004.
- Eurasian Economic Union - Customs union since 2010, common market since 2012.
- European Union (EU) - Economic union of 27 European states, but only 20 are inside the Eurozone are also part of an economic and monetary union.
- European Economic Area (EEA) - Economic area between European Union and EFTA member states (except Switzerland).
- Gulf Cooperation Council
- Mercosur

Note: Every economic and monetary union includes an economic union.

Additionally the autonomous and dependent territories, such as some of the EU member state special territories, are sometimes treated as separate customs territory from their mainland state or have varying arrangements of formal or de facto customs union, common market and currency union (or combinations thereof) with the mainland and in regards to third countries through the trade pacts signed by the mainland state.

=== Proposed ===
- African Economic Community (AEC) - proposed for 2023
- Andean Community (CAN)
- Arab Customs Union and Common Market - proposed for 2020
- CANZUK
- Central American Common Market (CACM)
- Closer Economic Relations of Australia and New Zealand
- East African Community (EAC) - extension of existing customs union proposed in 2015
- Economic Community of Central African States (ECCAS)
- Economic Community of West African States (ECOWAS)
- Southern African Development Community (SADC) - proposed in 2015
- Union of South American Nations (USAN)

== See also ==
- List of multilateral free-trade agreements
- List of bilateral free-trade agreements
- Supranational union
