= Customs union =

Type of trade bloc with a free trade area and common external tariff

A customs union is generally defined as a type of trade bloc which is composed of a free trade area with a common external tariff.

Customs unions are established through trade pacts where the participant countries set up common external trade policy (in some cases they use different import quotas). Common competition policy is also helpful to avoid competition deficiency.

Reasons for establishing a customs union normally include increasing economic efficiency and establishing closer political and cultural ties between the member countries. It is the third stage of economic integration. Every economic union, customs and monetary union and economic and monetary union includes a customs union.

== WTO definition ==
The General Agreement on Tariffs and Trade, part of the World Trade Organization framework defines a customs union in the following way:

(a) A customs union shall be understood to mean the substitution of a single customs territory for two or more customs territories, so that

(i) duties and other restrictive regulations of commerce (except, where necessary, those permitted under Articles XI, XII, XIII, XIV, XV and XX) are eliminated with respect to substantially all the trade between the constituent territories of the union or at least with respect to substantially all the trade in products originating in such territories, and,

(ii) subject to the provisions of paragraph 9, substantially the same duties and other regulations of commerce are applied by each of the members of the union to the trade of territories not included in the union;

== Historical background ==
The German Customs Union, the Zollverein, which was established in 1834, and gradually developed and expanded, was a customs union organization that appeared earlier and played a role in promoting German economic development and political unification at that time. Before the establishment of the unified German Empire in the 1870s, there were checkpoints between and within the German states, which hindered the development of industry and commerce. In 1818, Prussia took the lead in abolishing the customs duties in the mainland; it was followed by the establishment of the North German Customs Union in 1826. Two years later, two customs unions were established in the states of South Germany. It was brought into action by the initiative of Prussia and joined by most of the German states. Pre-modern conditions ( 30+ currencies, trade barriers etc.) were viewed as an obstacle to economic exchange and growth by the new commercial classes, who argued for the creation of a unified economic territory allowing the unhindered movement of goods, people and capital.

In 1834, 18 states joined to form the German Customs Union with Prussia as the leader. Thereafter, this alliance was further expanded to all German-speaking regions and became the All-German Customs Union. The contents of the alliance convention included: abolishing internal tariffs, unifying external tariffs, raising import tax rates, and allocating tariff income to all states in the alliance in proportion. In addition, there is a customs union between France and Monaco, which was established in 1865.

A customs union was established by Switzerland and Liechtenstein in 1924, by Belgium, the Netherlands, and Luxembourg in 1948, by the countries of the European Economic Community in 1958, and by the Economic Community of Central African States in 1964. At that time, the European Free Trade Association was separate from the European Economic Community Customs Union. Free trade within the former was limited to industrial products, and no uniform tariffs were imposed on countries outside the Union.

== Main features ==
The main features of a customs union is that the member countries not only eliminate trade barriers and implement free trade, but also establish a common external tariff. In other words, in addition to agreeing to eliminate each other's trade barriers, members of a customs union also adopt common external tariffs and trade policies. GATT stipulates that if the customs union is not established immediately, but is gradually completed over a period of time, it should be completed within a reasonable period, which generally does not exceed 10 years.

== Protection measures ==
The exclusive protection measures of a customs union include the following:

- Reduction of tariffs until the tariffs within the union are eliminated. In order to achieve this goal, the union often stipulates that the member countries must transition from their current tariff rates between member countries to the unified tariff rates stipulated by the union in stages within a certain period of time, until finally abolishing tariffs.
- Formulation of a unified foreign trade policy and foreign tariff rates. Members must alter their original foreign tariff rates within the prescribed time, and eventually establish a common external tariff; and gradually unify their foreign trade policies, such as foreign discrimination policies and import quantities.
- Formulation of unified protective measures, such as import quotas, health and epidemic prevention standards, etc.

== Economic effects ==
Economic effects of customs unions can generally be grouped into static effects and dynamic effects.

=== Static effects ===
There are trade creation effects and trade diversion effects. The trade creation effect refers to the benefit generated by the transfer of domestic production to other countries in the union with lower costs. The trade diversion effect refers to the loss incurred when a product had previously been usually imported from a non-member country with lower production costs, but is now usually imported from a member country that has a higher cost, because of the change in tariffs.

The trade creation effect is usually regarded as a positive effect. This is because the domestic production cost of country A is higher than the production cost of country A 's imports from country B. The Customs Union made Country A give up the domestic production of some commodities and change it to Country B to produce these commodities. From a worldwide perspective, this kind of production conversion improves the efficiency of resource allocation.

=== Dynamic effects ===
The customs union does not only bring static effects to member states, but also brings some dynamic effects. Sometimes, these dynamic effects are more important than the static effects, which has an important impact on the economic growth of member countries.

1. One dynamic effect of a customs union is the large market effect (or economies of scale). After the establishment of a customs union, conditions are created for the mutual export of products between member countries. This expansion of the market promotes increases in production, which reduce costs.
2. The establishment of a customs union promotes competition in the market, by allowing companies from across the union to compete on equal terms. As a result, enterprises will tend to increase research and development investment and continuously reduce production costs, thereby creating a strong competitive atmosphere.
3. The establishment of a customs union also helps to attract foreign direct investment, both by increasing the size of the market and putting producers in non-member states at a disadvantage. The establishment of a customs union implies the exclusion of products from non-members.

== Lists of customs unions ==
European Union Customs Union Eurasian Customs Union East African Community West African Economic and Monetary Union Southern African Customs Union Economic and Monetary Community of Central Africa Mercosur Andean Community Caribbean Community Central American Common Market Gulf Cooperation Council Switzerland–Liechtenstein United Kingdom–Crown Dependencies Customs Union

=== Current ===
Agreement	Date (in force)	WTO reference
Andean Community (CAN)	25 May 1988	L/6737
Caribbean Community (CARICOM)	1 January 1991	L/4083
Central American Common Market (CACM)	6 October 2004	L/1425
Common Market for Eastern and Southern Africa (COMESA)	1 January 2005	WT/COMTD/N/3
East African Community (EAC)	1 January 2005	WT/COMTD/N/14
Economic and Monetary Community of Central Africa (CEMAC)	1 June 1999	WT/COMTD/N/13
Eurasian Customs Union (EACU)	1 July 2010	WT/REG358/N/1
European Union Customs Union (EUCU)	1958	L/626
∟ EU–Andorra Customs Union	1 July 1991	WT/REG53/N/1
∟ EU–Gibraltar Customs Union	15 July 2026	
∟ EU–San Marino Customs Union	1 April 2002	WT/REG280/N/1
∟ EU–Turkey Customs Union	1 January 1996	WT/REG22/N/1
(Cooperation Council for the Arab States of the Gulf) Gulf Cooperation Council (GCC)	1 January 2015	WT/REG222/N/1
Israel–Palestinian Authority	1994	
(Mercosur) Southern Common Market (MERCOSUR)	29 November 1991	L/7044
Southern African Customs Union (SACU)	1910	WT/REG231/N/1
Switzerland–Liechtenstein (CH-FL)	1924	
West African Economic and Monetary Union (WAEMU)	10 January 1994	WT/COMTD/N/11
United Kingdom–Crown Dependencies Customs Union (UK-CD)	26 November 2018	UK CD CU

Additionally, the autonomous and dependent territories such as some of the EU member state special territories are sometimes treated as separate customs territories from their mainland states or have varying arrangements of formal or de facto customs union, common market and currency union (or combinations thereof) with the mainland and in regards to third countries through the trade pacts signed by the mainland state.

=== Proposed ===
- 2010 Southern African Development Community (SADC)
- 2011 Economic Community of Central African States (ECCAS)
- 2015 Arab Customs Union (ACU)
- 2023 African Economic Community (AEC)

=== Defunct ===
- The Zollverein in the German states (1834–1919) – Remained in effect after German unification and not dissolved until superseded by the Weimar Constitution of 1919.
- (Austria-Hungary) – Customs union between Austria (later Austria–Hungary) and Liechtenstein from 1852 to 1918.
- Customs and Economic Union of Central Africa (UDEAC) – superseded by CEMAC
- (French Third Republic) 1925 French Customs Union over occupied Territory of the Saar Basin
- (Duchy of Brunswick) (Kingdom of Hanover) (Grand Duchy of Oldenburg) Steuerverein or Tax Union in north-west Germany
- Custom Union between Lebanon and Syria
- Czech Republic and Slovakia from the dissolution of Czechoslovakia on 1 January 1993 until superseded by both countries' accession to the European Union on 1 May 2004.

== See also ==
- Freedom of movement § Examples of free movement arrangements between countries
- European Customs Information Portal (ECIP)
- List of international trade topics
- Trade creation
- Trade diversion
- Open Balkan
- Craiovia Group
- CEFTA
