= Eastern Caribbean Currency Union =

Organization

The members of the Organisation of Eastern Caribbean States (dark green) and associate members (light green). All use the East Caribbean dollar except for the British Virgin Islands, which uses the US dollar.

The Eastern Caribbean Currency Union (ECCU) is one of the world's four regional currency unions. The union is a development of the Organization of Eastern Caribbean States, in which the member countries agree to share the same currency, the Eastern Caribbean dollar (EC dollar).

The ECCU is composed of the nations of Antigua and Barbuda, Dominica, Grenada, St. Kitts and Nevis, St. Lucia, and St. Vincent and the Grenadines and the British territories of Anguilla and Montserrat.

The ECCU economies are very small and vulnerable to impacts. Geographic barriers also pose a challenge for market integration, and high import and production costs affects economic activity. With a combined total population in 2013 of approximately 500,000 inhabitants and a 1998 GDP of $2.6 billion, the countries face risks from natural disasters.

The ECCU came into operation in 1983 when it replaced its predecessor, the Eastern Caribbean Currency Authority. The currency union operates under the supervision of the Eastern Caribbean Central Bank (ECCB). The ECCB maintains a stable currency by ensuring sufficient foreign reserves and setting borrowing limits for governments and banks. In 2009-2010, foreign reserve backing was 93.93%, well above the prescribed 60% requirement.

Before 1976, the EC dollar was pegged to the British pound sterling (GBP) at an exchange rate of EC$4.80 to £1.00. However, since 7 July 1976, the EC dollar has been pegged to the US dollar at a fixed rate of EC$2.70 to US$1.00. The fixed exchange rate allows for macroeconomic stability, low inflation, and growth of the financial system.
