= Common Market for Eastern and Southern Africa =

Regional economic community including eastern and southwestern African states

Common Market for Eastern and Southern Africa (COMESA)
(in other official languages)
Arabic	السوق المشتركة لشرق وجنوب أفريقيا
French	Marché commun de l'Afrique orientale et australe
Portuguese	Mercado Comum da África Oriental e Austral
- Coat of arms
- Anthem: "People of Africa"
- Map of Africa indicating COMESA membership Current members Former members
- Secretariat: Lusaka, Zambia
- Official languages: Arabic; English; French; Portuguese
- Type: Trade bloc
- Membership: 21 states: Burundi; Comoros; DR Congo; Djibouti; Egypt; Eritrea; Eswatini; Ethiopia; Kenya; Libya; Madagascar; Malawi; Mauritius; Rwanda; Seychelles; Somalia; Sudan; Tunisia; Uganda; Zambia; Zimbabwe

Leaders
  - Chairman: Emmerson Mnangagwa
  - Secretary General: Chileshe Mpundu Kapwepwe
- Establishment: Agreement
  - Signed: 5 November 1993
  - Ratified: 8 December 1994

Area
  - Total: 12,000,000 km^{2} (4,600,000 sq mi)

Population
  - Estimate: Over 640 million
- GDP (PPP): estimate
  - Total: $1.0 trillion
- Website www.comesa.int

The Common Market for Eastern and Southern Africa (COMESA) is a regional economic community in Africa with twenty-one member states stretching from Tunisia to Eswatini. COMESA was formed in December 1994, replacing a Preferential Trade Area which had existed since 1981. Nine of the member states formed a free trade area in 2000 (Djibouti, Egypt, Kenya, Madagascar, Malawi, Mauritius, Sudan, Zambia and Zimbabwe), with Rwanda and Burundi joining the FTA in 2004, the Comoros and Libya in 2006, Seychelles in 2009, Uganda in 2012 and Tunisia in 2018.

COMESA is one of the pillars of the African Economic Community.

In 2008, COMESA agreed to an expanded free-trade zone including members of two other African trade blocs, the East African Community (EAC) and the Southern Africa Development Community (SADC). COMESA is also considering a common visa scheme to boost tourism.

== Membership ==
=== Current members ===
Country	Joined
Horn of Africa countries
Djibouti	21 Dec 1981
Eritrea	1994
Ethiopia	21 Dec 1981
Somalia	21 Dec 1981 (PTA) / 19 Jul 2018 (COMESA)
North African countries
Egypt	6 Jan 1999
Libya	3 Jun 2005 (Note: 10th COMESA summit, as Libyan Arab Jamahiriya)
Sudan	21 Dec 1981
Tunisia	18 Jul 2018
Indian Ocean
Comoros	21 Dec 1981
Madagascar	"
Mauritius	"
Seychelles	2001
African Great Lakes
Burundi	21 Dec 1981
Kenya	"
Malawi	"
Rwanda	"
Uganda	"
Southern Africa
Eswatini	21 Dec 1981 (Note: As Swaziland)
Zambia	"
Zimbabwe	"
Central Africa
Democratic Republic of the Congo	21 Dec 1981 (Note: As Zaire)

=== Former members ===
Country	Left
Lesotho	1997
Mozambique	1997
Tanzania	2 Sep 2000
Namibia	2 May 2004
Angola	2007 (Note: Self-suspension: "SADC, COMESA and the EAC: Conflicting regional and trade agendas". Institute for Global Dialogue. October 2008. Archived from the original on 1 January 2017.; "African integration is great but has its hurdles". New Vision. 26 May 2010. Archived from the original on 19 June 2010.)

== Organs ==
According to the treaties, the following organs have decision-making power:

- The COMESA Authority, composed of heads of states or government and is COMESA's supreme policy-making organ. The Authority is headed by a chairman elected for an agreed period; the current chairperson from October 2026 is Zimbabwe's President Emmerson Mnangagwa. The Authority is tasked with the general policy direction and controlling the overall performance of the executive functions of COMESA. The COMESA Authority meets once a year at summits which are held in different member states. The hosting government and the COMESA Secretariat bear joint responsibility for their organization. Whilst the hosting country assumes the chairmanship of the Authority for the year, an Extraordinary Summit can be held at the request of any member of the Authority; so long as one-third of the members of the Authority support such a request. The Authority meetings are held in closed sessions and usually decisions are taken by consensus. The session leaders have to issue a communiqué, recording any decisions made. These directives and decisions taken by the Authority are binding on all member states and the other organs to which they are addressed.
- The COMESA Council of Ministers
- The COMESA Court of Justice decisions have precedence over any decisions of national courts. The Court of Justice may receive cases not only from member states, but also from natural and legal persons, against the council to determine the legality of any act towards the directives, regulation or decision made. The persons are also permitted under the treaty to sue a member state in the COMESA Court; the legality under the treaty of any act, directive regulation, or decision of such member state.

In the event that a member state's court is reviewing the application or interpretation of the Treaty, it may request the court's opinion on the matter.

If the national court is a court from which there is no appeal or remedy, then court is required to refer the question to the COMESA court. The national remedies must be exhausted before a person can bring a matter to the COMESA CJ. The COMESA Court has jurisdiction over suits brought by COMESA employees and third parties against COMESA or its institutions. It also may act as an arbitrary tribunal on any matter arising from a contract to which COMESA or any of its institutions is a party. Further, the court can adjudicate any dispute between member states who agree to bring the dispute before it.

Unlike the Statute of the International Court, the treaty does not state the sources of law to be applied by the court. The treaty and any COMESA issued legal instruments, will make the initial law to be applied, but municipal law and international law may also be determined applicable by the court.

While the jurisdiction of the COMESA Court provides multiple avenues for the creation of standard interpretation of the Treaty, there is no specific provision of an avenue for the settlement of disputes between the institutions of the Common Market. The court is not given the power to interpret the statutes of the other COMESA institutions. Finally, the treaty does not specify that the court will have jurisdiction over human rights issues within the context of community.

Due to its varying jurisdictions of the court, the Eighth Meeting of Ministers of Justice and Attorneys General recommended to the Council of Ministers and the Authority that the Treaty be amended to provide for two divisions in the court, the Court of First Instance and the Appellate Division. The proposal was adopted and the court was expanded in June 2005 with the appointment of seven judges in the Court of First Instance and five judges in the Appellate Division. The work of the court was then suspended until the Appellate Division judges were appointed and the Rules of Court for the Appellate Division were drawn up and adopted. During this reformation of the court, the previously fully independent court was made subject to the review of any proposed Rules of Court by the ministers of justice and attorneys-general. The court was established under the 1994 Treaty. The first set of judges was not appointed until 1998.

Unlike other African regional courts, the COMESA Court continues to receive cases. However, due to lack of funds the court is unable to hear all its cases at certain times. Funding is only done for one session of the court per year, these has contributed greatly to piling of cases. The backlog of cases will most certainly increase with the current growth in trade disputes in the region.

- The Committee of Governors of Central Banks

The following lower policy organs make recommendations to the above:

- The Inter-governmental Committee
- Twelve Technical Committees
- Consultative Committee of the Business Community and other Interest Groups
- COMESA Secretariat

Other COMESA institutions created to promote development and regional integration are:

- PTA Bank (Eastern and Southern African Trade and Development Bank) in Bujumbura, Burundi
- COMESA Clearing House in Harare, Zimbabwe
- COMESA Association of Commercial Banks in Harare, Zimbabwe
- COMESA Leather Institute in Addis Ababa, Ethiopia
- COMESA Re-Insurance Company (ZEP-RE) in Nairobi, Kenya
- Regional Investment Agency in Cairo, Egypt
- COMTEL Project, aimed at creating regional telecommunications infrastructure (project was discontinued in 2021 following failure to take-off after 20 years)
- Regional Association of Energy Regulators for Eastern and Southern Africa (RAERESA) in Lusaka, Zambia
- COMESA Competition Commission, in Lilongwe, Malawi

== List of secretaries general ==
The United Nations Economic Commission for Africa provided an interim secretariat for the Preferential Trade Area from December 1981 (signing of the Lusaka treaty) until December 1982 (first meeting of the PTA). UNECA Secretary General Adebayo Adedeji was the interim secretary general of the PTA during this time. UNECA official Bax Nomvete would go on to serve as PTA secretary general.

No.	Image	Name	Country	Took office	Left office
Secretary general of the Preferential Trade Area
1		Semyano Kiingi	Uganda	1983	1984
2		Bax Dale Nomvete	United Nations	1984	1990
3		Bingu Wa Mutharika	Malawi	1991	1994
Secretary General of the Common Market
–		Bingu Wa Mutharika	Malawi	1994	1997
4		Erastus J. O. Mwencha	Kenya	1998	2008
5		Sindiso Ngwenya	Zimbabwe	2008	2018
6		Chileshe Kapwepwe	Zambia	2018	Incumbent

== Comparison with other regional blocs ==
African Economic Community
Pillar regional blocs (REC)	Area (km²)	Population	GDP (PPP) ($US)		Member states
Pillar regional blocs (REC)	Area (km²)	Population	(millions)	(per capita)	Member states
EAC	5,449,717	349,966,685	737,420	2,149	8
ECOWAS/CEDEAO	5,112,903	349,154,000	1,322,452	3,788	15
IGAD	5,233,604	294,197,387	225,049	1,197	7
AMU/UMA ^{4}	6,046,441	106,919,526	1,299,173	12,628	5
ECCAS/CEEAC	6,667,421	218,261,591	175,928	1,451	11
SADC	9,882,959	394,845,175	737,392	3,152	15
COMESA	12,873,957	406,102,471	735,599	1,811	20
CEN-SAD ^{4}	14,680,111				29
Total AEC	29,910,442	853,520,010	2,053,706	2,406	54
Other regional blocs	Area (km²)	Population	GDP (PPP) ($US)		Member states
Other regional blocs	Area (km²)	Population	(millions)	(per capita)	Member states
WAMZ ^{1}	1,602,991	264,456,910	1,551,516	5,867	6
SACU ^{1}	2,693,418	51,055,878	541,433	10,605	5
CEMAC ^{2}	3,020,142	34,970,529	85,136	2,435	6
UEMOA ^{1}	3,505,375	80,865,222	101,640	1,257	8
UMA ^{2} ^{4}	5,782,140	84,185,073	491,276	5,836	5
GAFTA ^{3} ^{4}	5,876,960	1,662,596	6,355	3,822	5
AES	2,780,159	71,374,000	179,347		3
During 2004. Sources: The World Factbook 2005, IMF WEO Database. Smallest value among the blocs compared. Largest value among the blocs compared.^{1}: Economic bloc inside a pillar REC.^{2}: Proposed for pillar REC, but objecting participation.^{3}: Non-African members of GAFTA are excluded from figures.^{4}: The area 446,550 km^{2} used for Morocco excludes all disputed territories, while 710,850 km^{2} would include the Moroccan-claimed and partially-controlled parts of Western Sahara (claimed as the Sahrawi Arab Democratic Republic by the Polisario Front). Morocco also claims Ceuta and Melilla, making up about 22.8 km^{2} (8.8 sq mi) more claimed territory.

== See also ==
- Rules of Origin
- Market access
- Free-trade area
- Tariffs
- Trade bloc
- East African Community (EAC)
- Economic Community of Central African States (ECCAS)
- Economic Community of the Great Lakes Countries (ECGLC)
- Southern African Development Community (SADC)
- Southern African Customs Union (SACU)
- Southern African Confederation of Agricultural Unions (SACAU)
- Economic Community of West African States (ECOWAS)
- Arab Maghreb Union (UMA)
- Intergovernmental Authority on Development (IGAD)
- Greater Arab Free Trade Area (GAFTA)
- Yellow card system, the COMESA motor insurance scheme.
