= Free trade agreements of India =

India is party to free trade agreements (FTAs) and other trade agreements with many countries and trade blocs, and is negotiating with many others.

India Free-trade areas Agreement under negotiation

The negotiations for the Comprehensive Economic Partnership Agreement between India and the United Arab Emirates were completed in 88 days, which was the shortest time span for any free trade agreement signed by India.

== Overview ==
There are different types of trade agreements that enable preferential market access between India and signatory countries or trade blocs - preferential trade agreements (PTA), free trade agreements (FTA), and Comprehensive Economic Cooperation Agreements (CECA) and Comprehensive Economic Partnership Agreements (CEPA).

A preferential trade agreement (PTA) involves two or more partners agreeing to reduce tariffs on an agreed number of tariff lines (products). The list of products on which the partners agree to reduce duty is called the positive list. In general, PTAs do not cover substantially all trade. The India Mercosur Preferential Trade Agreement is an example of a PTA.

A free trade agreement (FTA) also involves reducing or eliminating tariffs on items traded between the partner countries; however each maintains individual tariff structure for non-members. The key difference between an FTA and a PTA is that PTAs have a positive list of products on which duty is to be reduced, while an FTA uses a negative list on which duty is not reduced or eliminated. Thus, compared to a PTA, FTAs are generally more ambitious in coverage of tariff lines on which duty is to be reduced. The India Sri Lanka Free Trade Agreement is an example of an FTA.

Comprehensive Economic Cooperation Agreement (CECA) and Comprehensive Economic Partnership Agreement (CEPA) are agreements which consist of an integrated package on goods, services and investment, as well as trade facilitation and rule-making in areas such as intellectual property, government procurement, technical standards and sanitary and phytosanitary issues. The India Korea CEPA is one such example and it covers a broad range of other areas such trade facilitation, customs cooperation, investment, competition, intellectual property rights etc. CECA/CEPAs are more comprehensive and ambitious than FTAs in terms of coverage of areas and the type of commitments. While a traditional FTA focuses mainly on goods, a CECA/CEPA provides holistic coverage of many areas like services, investment, competition, government procurement, disputes etc. Further, a CECA/CEPA looks deeper into the regulatory aspects of trade than an FTA. Due to this, it encompasses mutual recognition agreements (MRAs) that cover the regulatory regimes of the partners. An MRA recognises different regulatory regimes of partners on the presumption that they achieve the same end objectives.

== Bilateral agreements ==
Bilateral Trade Agreements of India India CEPA/CETA/CECPA CECA/ECTA FTA PTA Under Negotiation

Country	Agreement name	Type	Signed	Effective	Ref.
Afghanistan	Afghanistan–India Preferential Trade Agreement	PTA	6 March 2003	13 May 2003	
Australia	Australia–India Comprehensive Economic Cooperation Agreement	CECA	2 April 2022	29 December 2022	
Chile	Chile–India Preferential Trade Agreement	PTA	8 March 2006	11 September 2007	
Japan	India–Japan Comprehensive Economic Partnership Agreement	CEPA	16 February 2011	1 August 2011	
Malaysia	India–Malaysia Comprehensive Economic Cooperation Agreement	CECA	8 February 2011	1 July 2011	
Mauritius	India–Mauritius Comprehensive Economic Cooperation and Partnership Agreement	CECPA	22 February 2021	1 April 2021	
New Zealand	India–New Zealand Free Trade Agreement	FTA	27 April 2026	20 October 2026	
Oman	India–Oman Comprehensive Economic Partnership Agreement	CEPA	18 December 2025	1 June 2026	
Singapore	India–Singapore Comprehensive Economic Cooperation Agreement	CECA	29 June 2005	1 August 2005	
South Korea	India–South Korea Comprehensive Economic Partnership Agreement	CEPA	7 August 2009	1 January 2010	
Sri Lanka	India–Sri Lanka Free Trade Agreement	FTA	28 December 1998	1 March 2000	
Thailand	India–Thailand Free Trade Agreement	FTA	9 October 2003	1 September 2006	
United Arab Emirates	India–United Arab Emirates Comprehensive Economic Partnership Agreement	CEPA	18 February 2022	1 May 2022	
United Kingdom	India–United Kingdom Comprehensive Economic and Trade Agreement	CETA	24 July 2025	15 July 2026	
United States	India–United States Bilateral Trade Agreement	BTA	TBA		

=== Under negotiation ===
- Bangladesh (CEPA)
- Canada (CEPA)
- Chile (CEPA)
- Israel (FTA)
- Peru (FTA)
- South Africa (CEPA)

== Multilateral agreements ==
Multilateral Trade Agreements of India India India–EU FTA (2026) India–EFTA TEPA (2024) ASEAN–India CECA (2009) / AIFTA (2015) India–MERCOSUR PTA (2009) SAFTA (2006) APTA (1975)

Countries/Trading Bloc	Agreement name	Type	Signed	Effective	Ref.
Bangladesh; China; Laos; Mongolia; South Korea; Sri Lanka	Asia-Pacific Trade Agreement	PTA	1975 (revised November 2005)	17 July 1976 (revised 1 September 2006)	
ASEAN	ASEAN-India Trade in Goods Agreement	CECA	13 August 2009	1 January 2010	
ASEAN	ASEAN-India Trade in Services Agreement	CECA	November 2014	1 July 2015	
ASEAN	ASEAN-India Investment Agreement	CECA	November 2014	1 July 2015	
41 countries	Global System of Trade Preferences	PTA	13 April 1988	19 April 1989	
Mercosur	India–Mercosur Preferential Trade Agreement	PTA	25 January 2004	1 June 2009	
SAARC	South Asia Free Trade Agreement	FTA	6 January 2004	1 January 2006	
European Free Trade Association	India–EFTA Trade and Economic Partnership Agreement	TEPA	10 March 2024	1 October 2025	
European Union	India–European Union Free Trade Agreement	FTA	27 January 2026		
GCC	India–Gulf Cooperation Council Free Trade Agreement	FTA	TBA		

=== Under negotiation ===
- BIMSTEC (FTA)
- Eurasian Economic Union (FTA)
- IBSA (FTA)
- Southern African Customs Union (PTA)

=== Abandoned proposals ===
- Regional Comprehensive Economic Partnership

== See also ==
- Duty Free Tariff Preference
