= India-Nordic relations =

Relations between India and Nordic Countries

India–Nordic relations refer to the bilateral and multilateral ties between the Republic of India and the five Nordic countries of Denmark, Finland, Iceland, Norway, and Sweden. The relationship has been structured through a series of summits, with the third India-Nordic Summit held in Oslo, Norway, on 19 May 2026.

== Strategic and economic partnership ==
The leaders decided to elevate the India-Nordic relationship to a "trusted Green Technology and Innovation Strategic Partnership." The summit took place following the entry into force of the India-EFTA Trade and Economic Partnership Agreement (TEPA) in October 2025 and the conclusion of the India-EU Free Trade Agreement in January 2026. Under TEPA, EFTA states aim to invest US$100 billion in India, creating one million direct jobs. According to Prime Minister Modi, bilateral trade between India and the Nordic countries increased fourfold over the decade preceding 2026, and India's total trade with the Nordic countries was $19 billion in 2024.

== Multilateral, climate, Arctic, space, and future summits ==
The Nordic prime ministers expressed support for India's permanent membership in a reformed UN Security Council and welcomed India's application to the Nuclear Suppliers' Group (NSG). On climate action, the Nordic countries appreciated India's renewable energy targets, and the leaders emphasised affordable climate finance and technology transfer for developing countries. The leaders recognised India's observer status in the Arctic Council and welcomed its engagement in the council's working groups. In space cooperation, they welcomed a framework agreement between ISRO and the Norwegian Space Agency and a proposed Swedish payload on India's Venus Orbiter Mission. The leaders condemned the terrorist attacks in Pahalgam (22 April 2025) and near the Red Fort (10 November 2025). Regarding regional conflicts, they expressed concern over the war in Ukraine, called for implementation of UNSC resolution 2803 on Gaza, and welcomed the 8 April 2026 ceasefire in West Asia. The fourth India-Nordic Summit is scheduled to be hosted by Finland.

== Different views and criticisms ==
During Modi's European tour, Dutch Prime Minister Rob Jetten expressed concerns over press freedom and minority rights in India, particularly regarding the Muslim community. India's External Affairs Secretary Sibi George responded that such questions stem from a "lack of understanding." Unlike the Nordic countries, which consider Russia the primary security threat, India has maintained strategic ties with Russia and refrained from firmly condemning the invasion of Ukraine, though it has diversified energy imports after US tariffs. Regarding Arctic cooperation, analyst Garima Mohan noted that Nordic countries prefer keeping discussions within the Arctic Council rather than formalising bilateral mechanisms.

== See also ==
- Foreign relations of India
- India–European Union relations
- List of diplomatic missions of India
