= India–European Union relations =

European Union–India relations
- European Union: India

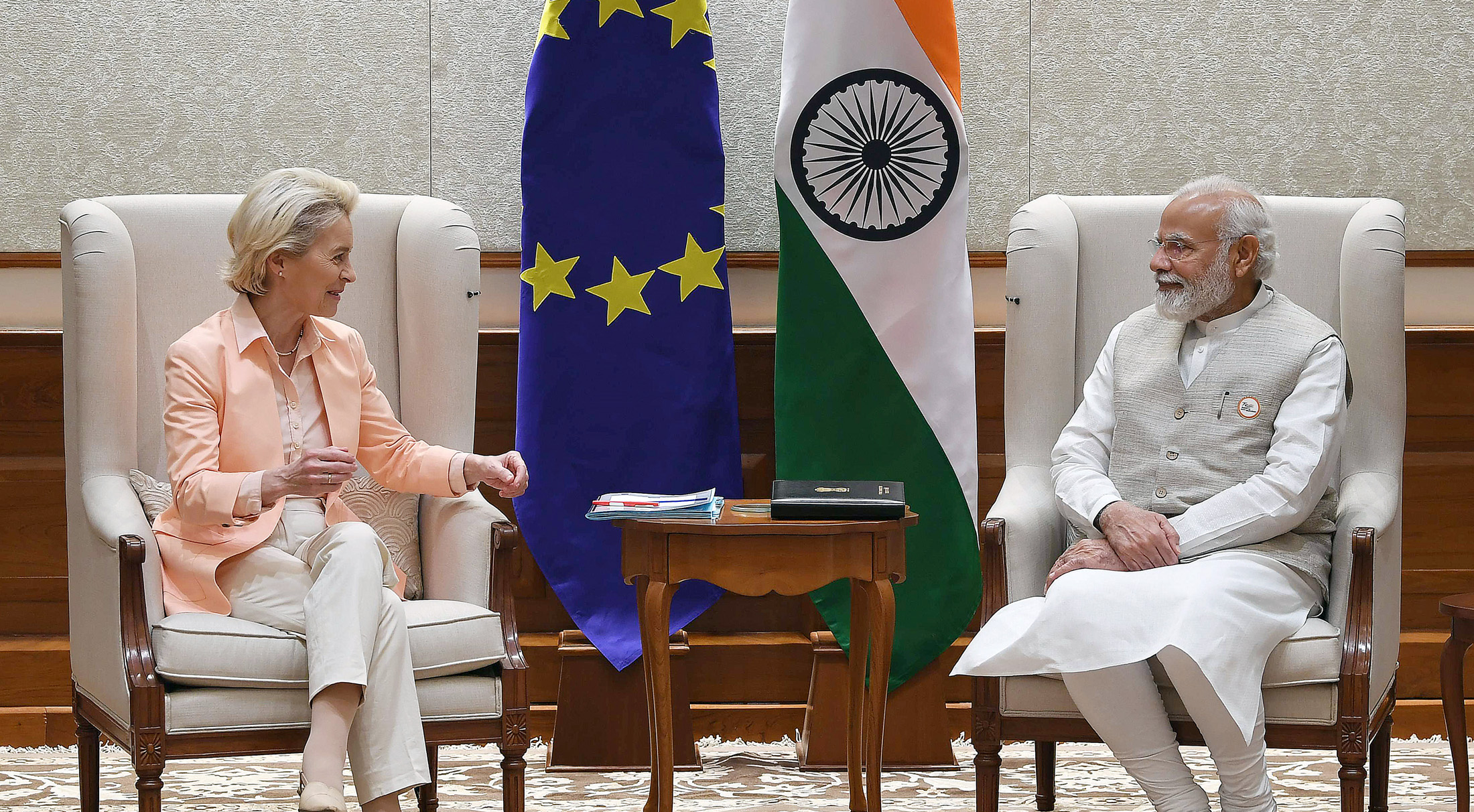
European Commission President Ursula von der Leyen and Indian Prime Minister Narendra Modi on 25 April 2022

Relations between the European Union and the Republic of India are currently defined by the 1994 EU–India Cooperation Agreement. The EU is a significant trade partner for India and the two sides have been attempting to negotiate a free trade deal since 2007. Which concluded on 27th January 2026. EU–India bilateral trade (excluding services trade) stood at US$104.3 billion in the financial year 2018–19.

== Trade ==
The EU is India's largest trading partner with 12.5% of India's overall trade between 2015 and 2016, ahead of China (10.8%) and the United States (9.3%). India is the EU's 9th largest trading partner with 2.4% of the EU's overall trade. Bilateral trade (in both goods & services) reached €115 billion in 2017 EU exports to India have grown from €24.2 billion in 2006 to €45.7 billion in 2018. India's exports to the EU also grew steadily from €22.6 billion in 2006 to €45.82 billion in 2018, with the largest sectors being engineering goods, pharmaceuticals, gems and jewellery, other manufactured goods and chemicals. Trade in services has also tripled between 2005 and 2016, reaching €28.9 billion. India is among the few nations in the world that run a surplus in services trade with the EU. Investment stocks from Europe to India reached €51.2 billion in 2015.

As of 2021, EU is India's third largest trading partner, accounting for €88 billion worth of trade in goods or 10.8% of total Indian trade.

In 2024, bilateral trade in goods totalled €120 billion, an increase of nearly 90% over the previous decade, according to European Union figures, alongside a further €60 billion in trade in services.

Between 2024 and 2025, bilateral goods trade stood at $136 billion or €116.80 billion. Indian exports to the EU was valued at $76 billion, while imports from the EU amounted to $60 billion.

France, Germany and the Netherlands collectively represent the major part of EU-India trade.

== Background ==
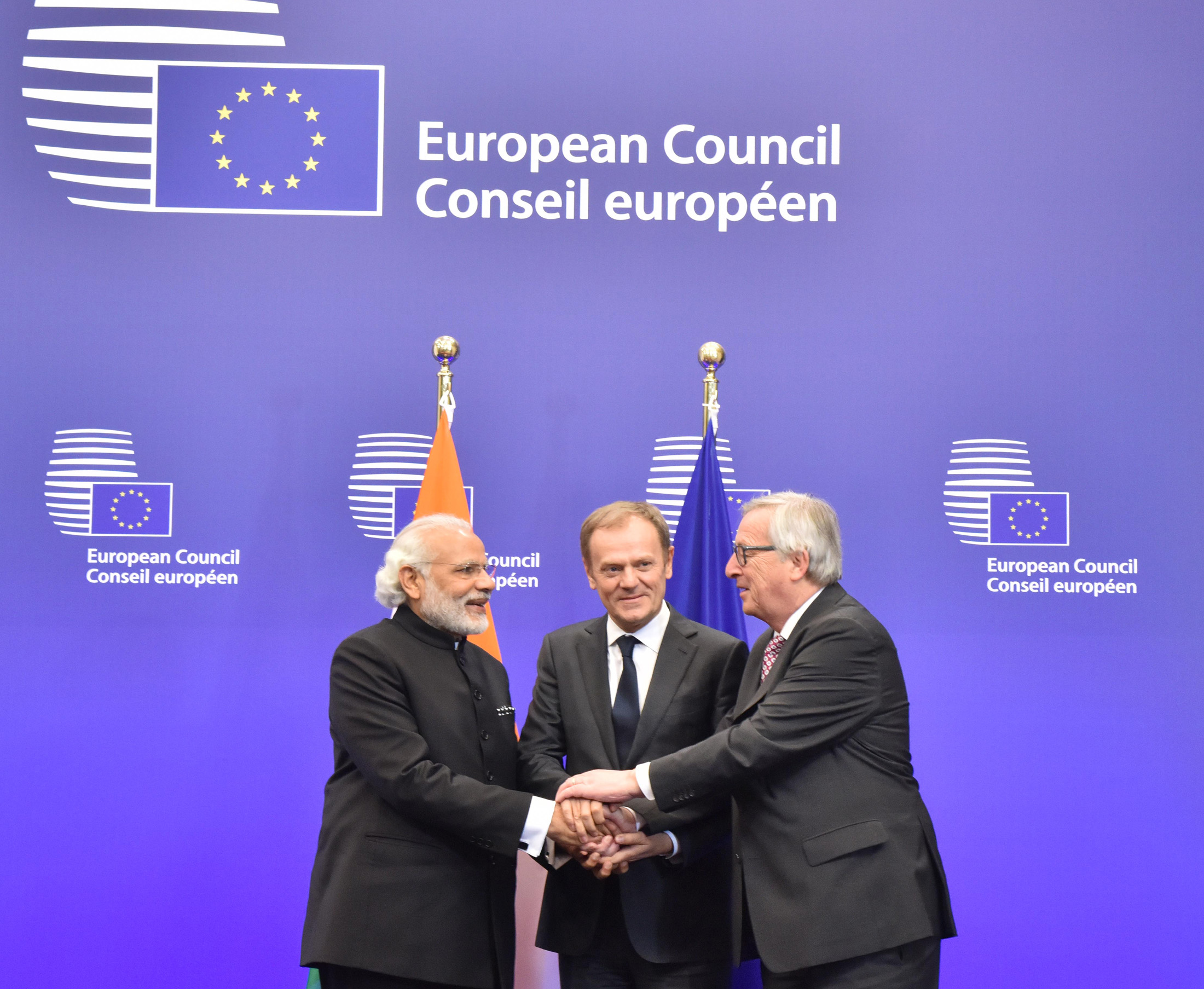
Indian PM Narendra Modi with the President of European Council Donald Tusk, and the President of European Commission Jean-Claude Juncker, at the EU-India Summit, Brussels, 2016

India–European Economic Community (EEC) relations were established in the early 1960s.

The Joint Political Statement of 1993 and the 1994 Co-operation Agreement were the foundational agreements for the bilateral partnership. In 2004, India and European Union became "Strategic Partners". A Joint Action Plan was agreed upon in 2005 and updated in 2008. India-EU Joint Statements was published in 2009 and 2012 following the India-European Union Summits. EU-India relationship has been qualified as high on rhetoric and low on substance.

In September 2025, US President Donald Trump asked the EU to impose tariffs on India to punish it for buying Russian oil and de facto financing Russia's invasion of Ukraine.

== Areas of Cooperation ==
=== Free trade negotiations ===
India and the EU have been working on a Broad-based Trade and Investment Agreement (BTIA) since 2007, but India's trade regime and regulatory environment remains comparatively restrictive. Seven rounds of negotiations have been completed without reaching a Free Trade Agreement Talks on an EU-India Bilateral Trade and Investment Agreement have stalled after failing to resolve differences related to matters such as the level of FDI & market access, manufacture of generic drugs, greenhouse gas emissions, civil nuclear energy, farming subsidies, regulation & safeguards of the financial sector, cooperation on tax evasion, overseas financing of NGOs in India, trade controls, technology transfer restrictions and cooperation on embargoes (Russia).

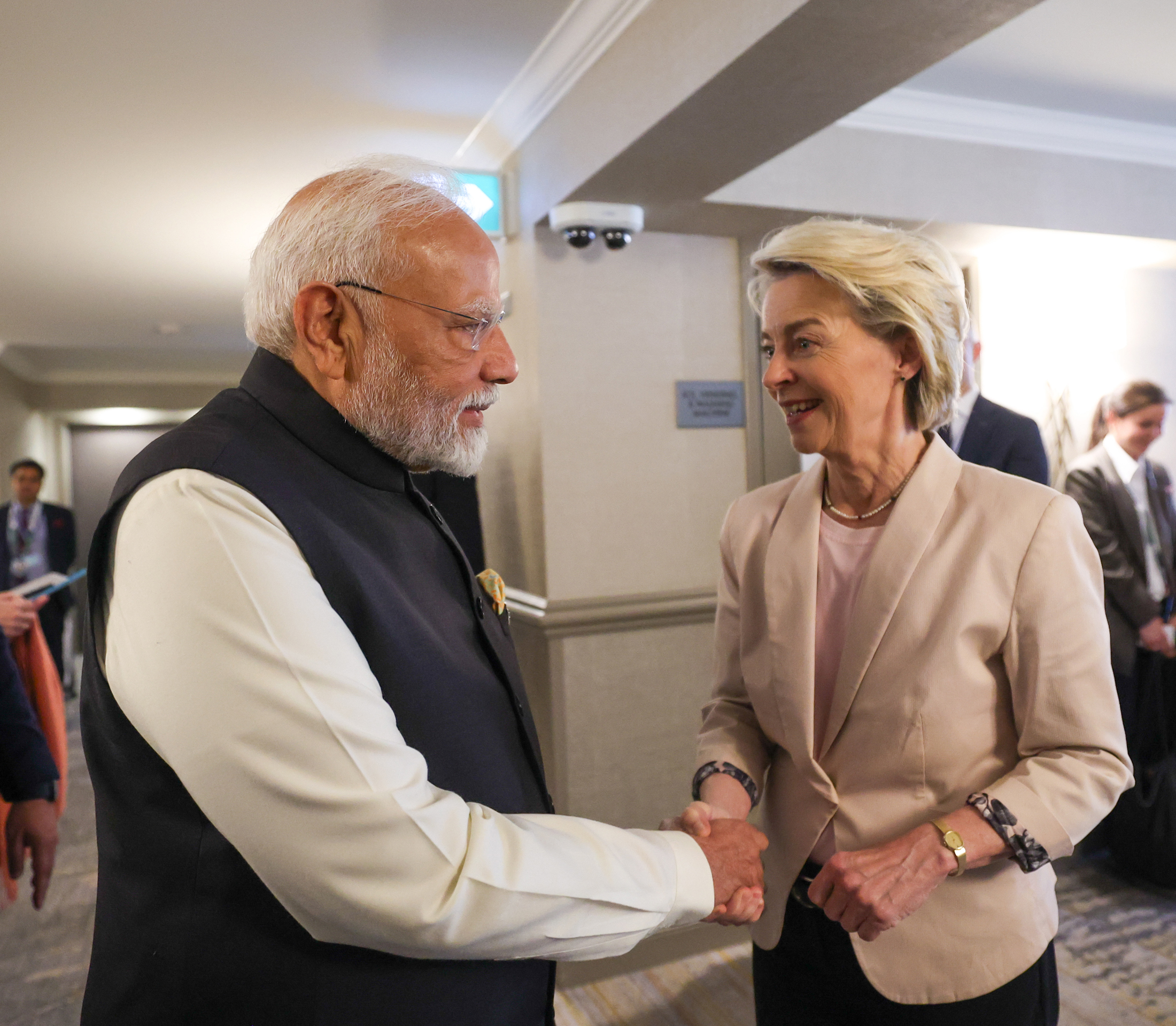
Indian Prime Minister Narendra Modi with European Commission President Ursula von der Leyen on 17 June 2025

In January 2015, India rejected a non-binding resolution passed by the European Parliament pertaining to maritime incidents which occurred within Indian Contiguous Zone. European Union Ambassador to India Joao Cravinho played down the resolution saying that the case will be resolved in accordance with Indian and International Laws.

India-EU FTA negotiations restarted in July 2022. India and the European Union on 28 February 2025, set the target to conclude the negotiation for the bilateral Free Trade Agreement by the end of the year. Prime Minister of India, Narendra Modi and European Commission President Ursula von der Leyen tasked the respective teams to pursue negotiations on FTA negotiations.

In September 2025, European Commission Vice-President Kaja Kallas expressed support for enhancing trade and security ties between the EU and India, while criticising India's close cooperation with Russia, including its participation in the Zapad 2025 military exercise.

In January 2026, both sides finally reached an agreement. Both EU chief Ursula von der Leyen and Indian trade minister Piyush Goyal described it as the 'mother of all trade deals.'

=== Nuclear energy ===
The EU and India agreed on 29 September 2008 at the EU-India summit in Marseille, to expand their co-operation in the fields of nuclear energy and environmental protection and deepen their strategic partnership. French President Nicolas Sarkozy, the EU's rotating president, said at a joint press conference at the summit that "EU welcomes India, as a large country, to engage in developing nuclear energy, adding that this clean energy will be helpful for the world to deal with the global climate change." Sarkozy also said the EU and Indian Prime Minister Manmohan pledged to accelerate talks on a free trade deal and expected to finish the deal by 2009.

The Indian prime minister was also cautiously optimistic about co-operation on nuclear energy. "Tomorrow we have a bilateral summit with France. This matter will come up and I hope some good results will emerge out of that meeting," Singh said when asked about the issue. Singh said that he was "very satisfied" with the results of the summit. He added that EU and India have "common values" and the two economies are complementary to each other.

European Commission President Jose Manuel Barroso expounded the joint action plan on adjustments of EU's strategic partnership with India, saying the two sides will strengthen co-operation on world peace and safety, sustainable development, co-operation in science and technology and cultural exchanges.

Reviewing the two sides' efforts in developing the bilateral strategic partnership, the joint action plan reckoned that in politics, dialogue and co-operation have enhanced through regular summits and exchanges of visits and that in economy, mutual investments have increased dramatically in recent years, dialogue in macro economic policies and financial services has established and co-operation in energy, science and technology and environment has been launched. Under the joint action plan, EU and Indian would enhance consultation and dialogue on human rights within the UN framework, strengthen co-operation in world peacekeeping mission, fight against terror and non-proliferation of arms, promote co-operation and exchange in developing civil nuclear energy and strike a free trade deal as soon as possible. France, which relies heavily on nuclear power and is a major exporter of nuclear technology, is expected to sign a deal that would allow it to provide nuclear fuel to India.

=== 12th EU-India Summit ===
On the eve of the Summit President Van Rompuy stated: "The 12th EU-India summit will confirm that EU and India are strengthening and rebalancing their partnership in its political dimension, thus bringing our relationship to new heights. It will demonstrate that increased co-operation between India and the EU can make a difference for the security and the prosperity of our continents." Although there were some apprehensions regarding the EU-enforced carbon tax on all fliers landing or passing through European skies that was opposed by many other countries, including India, China, the US and Russia, the European Union and India held their twelfth annual summit in New Delhi on 10 February 2012. Various EU representatives were present such as President Herman Van Rompuy and European Commission President José Manuel Barroso. The EU Trade commissioner, Karel De Gucht also attended the summit. The Republic of India was represented by Prime Minister Manmohan Singh, Foreign Minister S.M. Krishna, Trade Minister A. Sharma and National Security Adviser, S.S. Menon.

The summit agenda covered bilateral, regional and global issues. The Leaders emphasised the importance of the EU-India Strategic Partnership. They endeavoured to reinforce co-operation in security, in particular counter-terrorism, cyber-security and counter-piracy, as well as trade, energy, research and innovation.

=== India-EU Summits ===
Annual summit-level dialogues have been the cornerstone of India-EU relations. The first India-EU summit, held in Lisbon 2000, was a successful venture, which laid the roadmap for future partnership. The fifth India-EU Summit upgraded the relations to that of strategic partnership. Simultaneously, following the sixth India-EU summit held in New Delhi, both sides adopted the Joint Action Plan (JAP), which set out the roadmap for a strategic partnership between the two. The JAP included the strengthening of the dialogue and consultation mechanisms, deepening of political dialogue and cooperation and enhancing of economic policy dialogue and cooperation. During the ninth summit, India and the EU reviewed the JAP and a revised JAP was adopted adding 40 new elements in India-EU cooperation. During the 15th India-EU summit held virtually in 2020, an ambitious Roadmap to 2025 document was adopted. The 16th India-EU Summit was scheduled for May 2021. These summit-level meetings have provided a platform for both India and the EU to agree or disagree on a broad range of issues.

=== Defense Cooperation ===
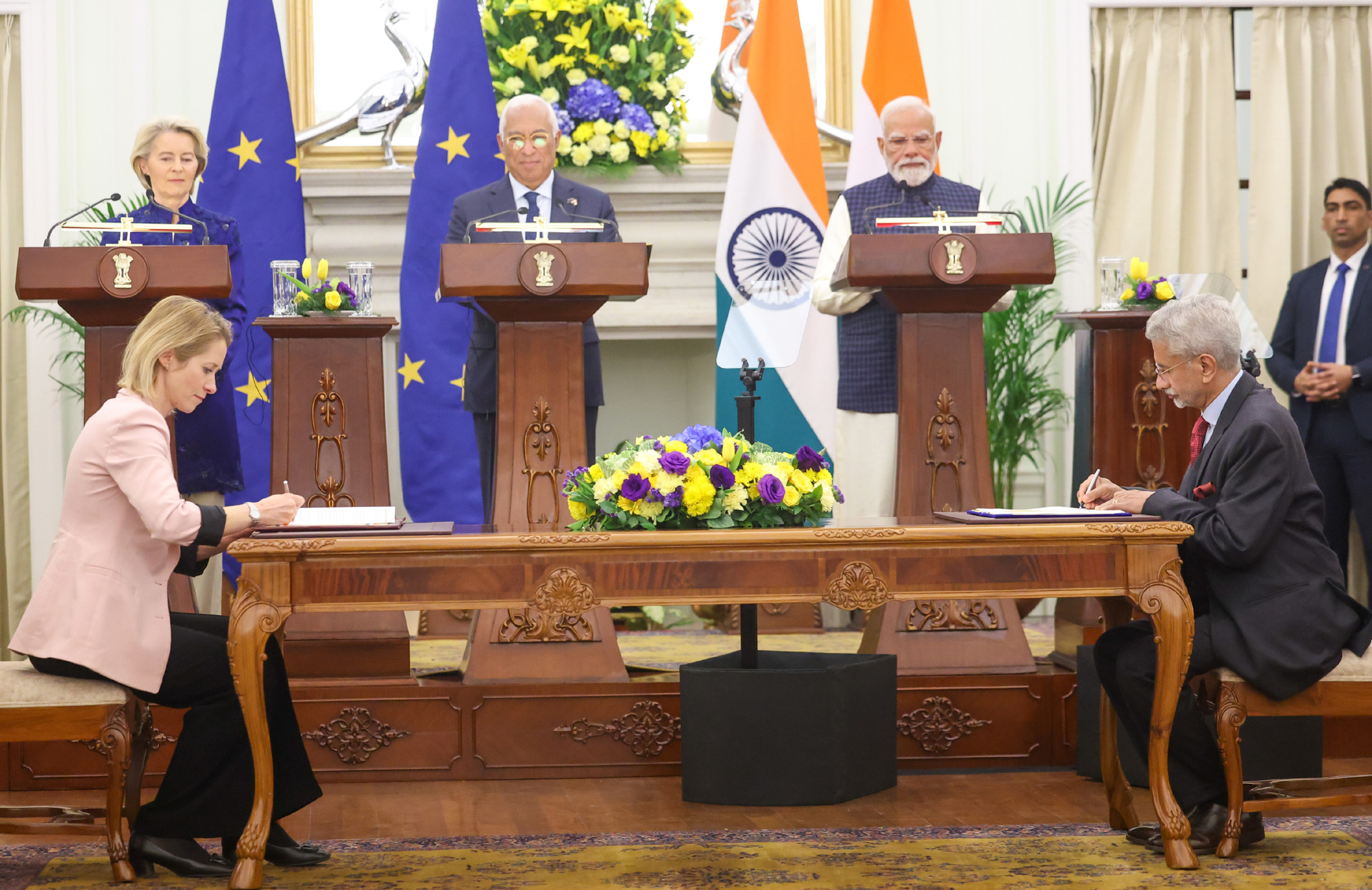
Kaja Kallas and S. Jaishankar signing a Security and Defence Partnership in New Delhi, 27 January 2026

In June 2025, the EU and India launched a Strategic Dialogue on Foreign and Security Policy alongside their annual Security and Defense Consultations, while continuing sectoral dialogues on maritime security, cybersecurity, counterterrorism and non-proliferation.

On 27 January 2026, the EU and India signed a Security and Defence Partnership with High Representative/Vice-President (HR/VP) Kaja Kallas representing the EU. The agreement establishes a comprehensive framework to guide strategic cooperation on peace, security, and defence, expanding collaboration in areas including maritime security, cyberdefense, counterterrorism, space security, emerging technologies, and capacity-building. It builds on longstanding EU-India security ties and reflects both sides’ commitment to addressing shared challenges, strengthening multilateral coordination, and promoting a stable, rules-based international order.

Indian defence manufacturers have partnered with major European firms, including Airbus, Dassault, and Rheinmetall.

==== Maritime Cooperation ====
Maritime security has emerged as a critical area of cooperation between India and the European Union. The Joint Action Plan adopted in 2005, highlighted and emphasised on maritime cooperation. In the past few decades, both India and the EU have stressed on the idea of freedom of navigation, maritime piracy, and adherence to United Nation Conventions on the Law of the Sea (UNCLOS) and the development of the blue economy and maritime infrastructure. Both have identified the Indo-Pacific as the new avenue for maritime cooperation. In January 2021, India and the EU hosted the first Maritime security dialogue in a virtual format.

India has participated in joint maritime activities with European Union Naval Force (EUNAVFOR) focused on counter-piracy operations in June 2025 and continued its engagement with the EU project Enhancing Security Cooperation in and with Asia and the Indo-Pacific (ESIWA+).

=== India-EU Cooperation on Climate Change ===
In the realm of climate change, India-EU relations have witnessed a commitment of international agreements such as the Kyoto Protocol and the Paris agreement. They have been collectively pushing for a comprehensive framework for global governance on climate change. The EU has also invested in numerous programmes such as India-EU water partnership, solar park programme, and Facilitating Offshore Wind in India (FOWIND). One of the major investments was the signing of the 200 million EUR loan agreement between the EIB and the Indian Renewable Energy Development Agency. Notwithstanding all the progress made so far, the potential for India-EU cooperation in Solar and Green Hydrogen still remains largely untapped.

=== India-EU Cooperation on Data Protection and Regulation ===
In the 15th India-EU Summit, both sides highlighted on driving a ‘human-centric’ digital transformation. The Roadmap 2025 document for the first time reflected the need to build effective cooperation on data protection and regulation. The differences in regulatory frameworks for data protection in India and the EU surfaced during the trade negotiations wherein the EU refused to accord India with ‘data secure’ status.

India and the EU have committed to work together in developing new standards and approaches for international ICT standardisation since 2015. During the 15th India-EU Summit, both sides agreed for greater convergence of the regulatory frameworks through data adequacy decision for the facilitation of cross-border data flow as well as engaging in dialogue regarding safe and ethical usage of AI and 5G.

=== Galileo ===
India has contributed towards the EU's satellite navigation system.

=== Trade and Technology Council ===
In April 2022, the EU and India agreed to set up a Trade and Technology Council (TTC) to step up on cooperation. It has been established as a coordination platform to address key trade, trusted technology and security challenges. On 16 May 2023, the European Union and India held their first ministerial meeting of the TTC in Brussels. Ministerial meetings of the TTC will take place at least once a year, with the venue alternating between the EU and India. The next ministerial meeting is scheduled for early 2024 in India.

== 2026 India EU deal ==
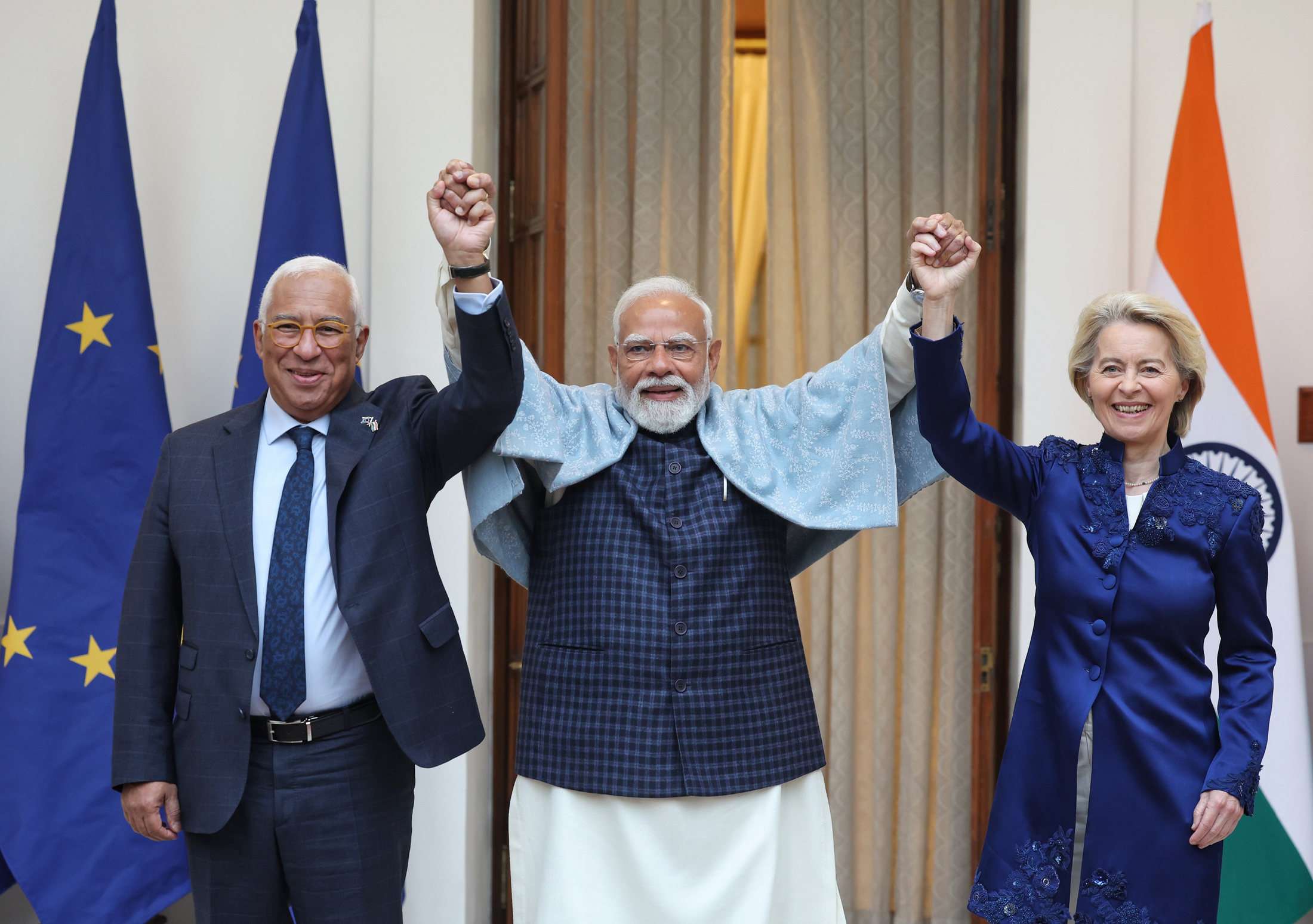
António Costa, Narendra Modi, and Ursula von der Leyen during the formal ceremony of the treaty's signing, 27 January 2026

In January 2026, India and the EU announced they have reached an agreement on a long-term Free Trade Agreement (FTA) after 20 years of negotiations. The final signing will take place once all legal issues are resolved. Both sides hope it will be effective in early 2027. The European Commission president Ursula von der Leyen called it the "mother of all deals".

The free trade deal will significantly lower or cancel tariffs on over 90% of goods, improve market access for both entities. India will cut duties on key EU exports like alcohol, food products, machinery, chemicals, aircraft, and medical equipment, while the EU eases access for Indian exports such as textiles and chemicals. The deal will also make it easier for companies to provide services across borders, especially in areas like finance, transport, and professional services. At the same time, it encourages more investment and cooperation between India and the EU, with shared commitments on sustainable development, climate action, and common rules, helping to build stronger long-term economic ties.

On 27 January 2026, Ursula von der Leyen signed a mobility and migration agreement with Indian Prime Minister Narendra Modi in New Delhi. This agreement, finalised alongside a free trade agreement (FTA), substantially enhances legal pathways to the EU for Indian students and skilled workers.

Under the legal text of the Indian- EU Free Trade Agreement finalized in September 2026, India secured an annual export quota of up to 1.64 million metric tons of steel to the EU, while Indian exporters remained subject to European Union carbon border adjustment mechanisms and tariffs.

== India's foreign relations with EU member states ==
- Austria
- Belgium
- Bulgaria
- Croatia
- Cyprus
- Czech Republic
- Denmark
- Estonia
- Finland
- France
- Germany
- Greece
- Hungary
- (Republic of Ireland) Ireland
- Italy
- Latvia
- Lithuania
- Luxembourg
- Malta
- Netherlands
- Poland
- Portugal
- Romania
- Slovakia
- Slovenia
- Spain
- Sweden

== See also ==
- Foreign relations of India
- Foreign relations of EU
- Euro-India Research Centre
- India–Russia relations
- India–United Kingdom relations
- India–United States relations
- India–EFTA Trade and Economic Partnership Agreement
