= India–Soviet Union relations =

- India: Soviet Union

India and the Soviet Union had cooperative and friendly relations. During the Cold War (1947–1991), India did not choose sides between the Capitalist Bloc and the Communist Bloc and was a leading country of the Non-Aligned Movement (NAM). Relations ended in 1991 with the dissolution of the Soviet Union.

== History ==
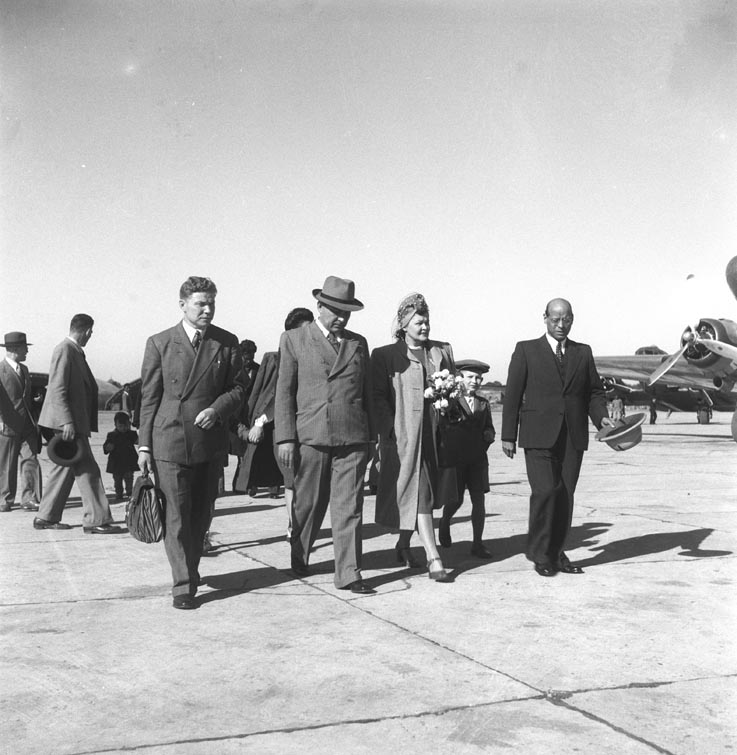
Kirill Novikov arriving in New Delhi in December 1947 to establish formal relations with India.

The Soviet Union played an essential role in facilitating anticolonial activism in India. The October Revolution of 1917 provided an anticolonial ideal to India's nationalist and left-wing leaders. Mahatma Gandhi called it the "greatest event" of the century, while other big nationalist leaders like Bal Gangadhar Tilak and Bipin Chandra Pal admired the event. Vladimir Lenin's writings and political relationship with anticolonial activists in India, shaped the Indian freedom struggle. Lenin's meetings with Indian communist intellectuals like Manabendra Nath Roy and Bhupendranath Datta influenced the intellectual policies of the Indian activists. Saumyendranath Tagore, the founder of the Revolutionary Communist Party of India, attended the Sixth World Congress of the Communist International in Moscow in 1928, where he debated Otto Willie Kuusinen.

The first consulate of Russia was opened in Mumbai in November 1900. Mumbai at the time was also a comfortable stopover for Haj pilgrims from the Asian republics under Russian rule.

Official relations were established in 1947 after India's independence. While Soviet leader Joseph Stalin initially had a negative view of India, it later changed. In 1951, the USSR exercised its veto power on the Kashmir dispute in support of India. In 1953, Joseph Stalin told Sarvepalli Radhakrishnan that, "Both you and Mr. Nehru are persons whom we do not consider our enemies. This will continue to be our policy and you can count on our help."

The relationship strengthened by 1955 and represented the successful Soviet attempts to foster closer relations with countries belonging to the non-aligned movement. In 1955, Prime Minister Jawaharlal Nehru made his first visit to the Soviet Union in June 1955, and First Secretary of the Communist Party Nikita Khrushchev's return trip to India happened in the fall of 1955. In India, Khrushchev announced that the Soviet Union supported Indian sovereignty over the disputed territory of the Kashmir region and also over Portuguese coastal enclaves such as Goa.

During the 1950s and 1960s, the Soviet Union significantly expanded KGB operations in India. In 1959 it created an import-export bank to subsidize the Communist Party of India (CPI). The KGB also exerted influence over Indian media, reportedly maintaining over ten newspapers on its payroll and placing over 3,789 articles in Indian publications in 1973 alone, more than in any other non-communist country.

The KGB carefully cultivated a close relationship with Indira Gandhi, surrounding her with male admirers during her 1953 visit to the Soviet Union. The KGB planted false stories against Gandhi's political opponents, and in 1969 encouraged the Indian communist parties to support Gandhi against her rivals in the Congress party. After the 1971 election Gandhi appointed the former Communist Mohan Kumaramangalam to the government, signed a secret Treaty of Peace, Friendship, and Co-operation with the Soviet Union and lifted limits on the size of the Soviet embassy staff.

Throughout the 1950s, there was Soviet assistance and technology transfer in multiple industrial sectors such as steel, defense, railways, construction equipment, metal, mining, petrochemicals and more to India. The Soviet Union's strong relations with India had a negative impact on both Soviet relations with China and Indian relations with China, during the Khrushchev period. The Soviet Union declared its neutrality during the 1959 border dispute and the Sino-Indian War of October 1962, although the Chinese strongly objected. The Soviet Union gave India substantial economic and military assistance and by 1960 India had received more Soviet assistance than China had. This disparity became another point of contention in Sino-Soviet relations. In 1962 the Soviet Union agreed to transfer technology to co-produce the Mikoyan-Gurevich MiG-21 jet fighter in India, which the Soviet Union had earlier denied to China.

In 1965, the Soviet Union successfully served as a peace broker between India and Pakistan after the Indo-Pakistani War of 1965. The Soviet Premier, Alexei Kosygin, met with representatives of India and Pakistan and helped them negotiate an end to the military conflict over Kashmir. The death of Lal Bahadur Shastri (the then Indian Prime Minister) at Tashkent, Uzbekistan, USSR, immediately after the Tashkent Peace treaty still remains an issue of controversy.

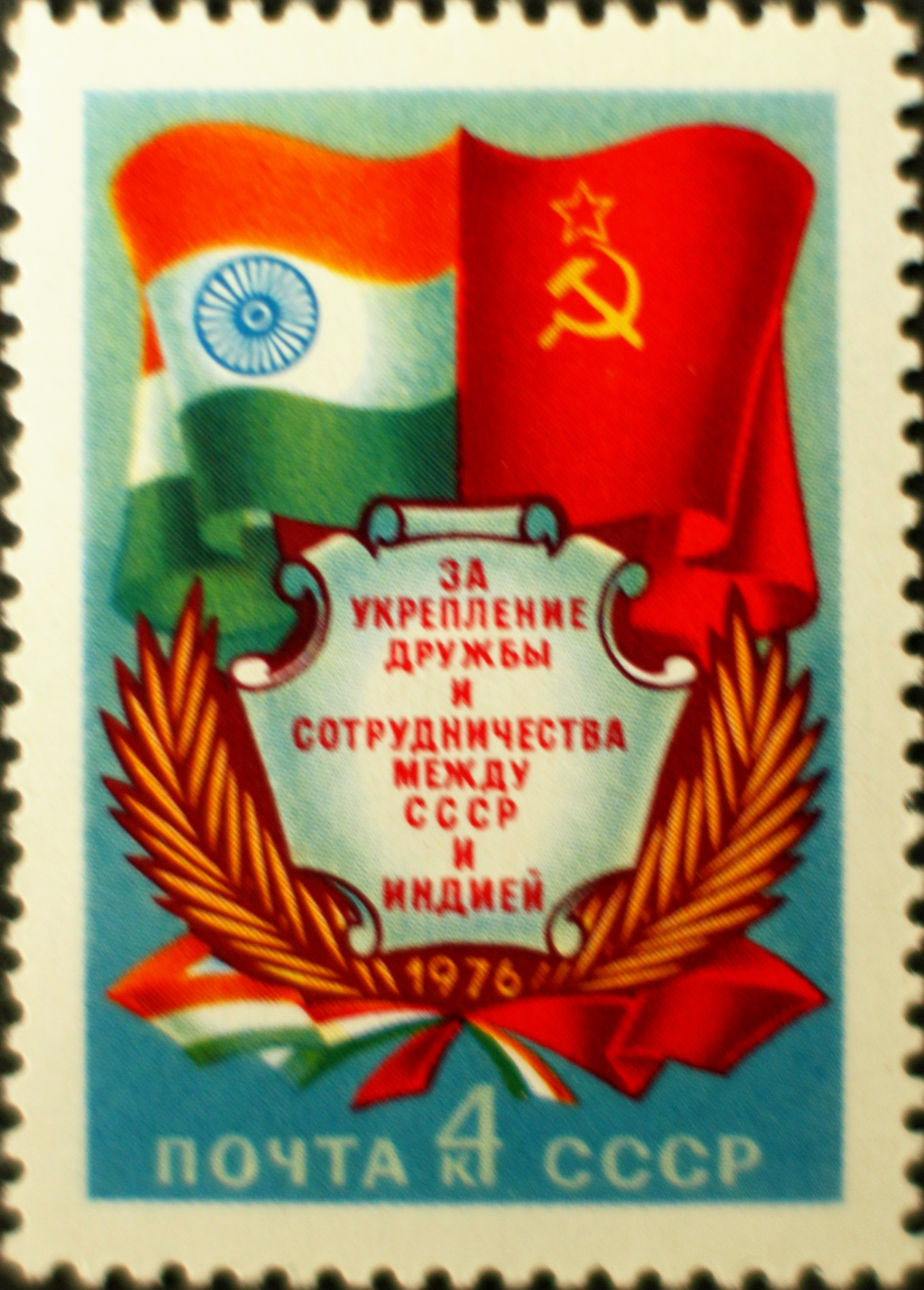
Soviet stamp in 1974

In 1971, the former East Pakistan region initiated an effort to secede from its political union with West Pakistan. India supported the secession and, as a guarantee against possible Chinese entrance into the conflict on the side of West Pakistan, it and the Soviet Union signed the Indo-Soviet Treaty of Friendship and Cooperation in August 1971. When the US sent its 7th Fleet and the UK sent its HMS Eagle, its allies, the Soviet Union, sent its Vladivostok Fleet and successfully pushed the Americans and British away. In December, India entered the conflict and ensured the victory of the secessionists and the establishment of the new state of Bangladesh.

Relations between the Soviet Union and India did not suffer much during the right-wing Janata Party's coalition government in the late 1970s, although India did move to establish better economic and military relations with Western countries. To counter these efforts by India to diversify its relations, the Soviet Union proffered additional weaponry and economic assistance. The KGB's influence was diminished however. For instance, articles planted by the KGB in the press declined from 1,980 stories in 1976 to 411 in 1977.

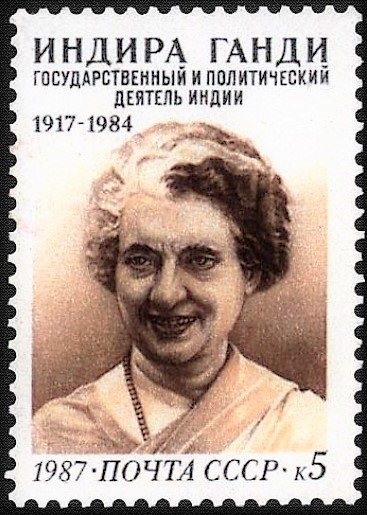
Indira Gandhi depicted on a 1987 Soviet stamp

Despite the 1984 assassination of Prime Minister Indira Gandhi, the mainstay of cordial Indian-Soviet relations, India maintained a close relationship with the Soviet Union. Indicating the high priority of relations with the Soviet Union in Indian foreign policy, the new Indian Prime Minister, Rajiv Gandhi, visited the Soviet Union on his first state visit abroad in May 1985 and signed two long-term economic agreements with the Soviet Union. According to Rejaul Karim Laskar, a scholar of Indian foreign policy, during this visit, Rajiv Gandhi developed a personal rapport with Soviet General Secretary Mikhail Gorbachev.

In turn, Gorbachev's first visit to a Third World state was his meeting with Rajiv Gandhi in New Delhi in late 1986. General Secretary Gorbachev unsuccessfully urged Rajiv Gandhi to help the Soviet Union set up an Asian collective security system. Gorbachev's advocacy of this proposal, which had also been made by Leonid Brezhnev, was an indication of continuing Soviet interest in using close relations with India as a means of containing China. With the improvement of Sino-Soviet relations in the late 1980s, containing China had less of a priority, but close relations with India remained important as an example of Gorbachev's new Third World policy.

== Relations between the Post-Soviet states and India ==
- Armenia
- Azerbaijan
- Belarus
- Estonia
- (Georgia (country)) Georgia
- Kazakhstan
- Kyrgyzstan
- Latvia
- Lithuania
- Moldova
- Russia
- Tajikistan
- Turkmenistan
- Ukraine
- Uzbekistan

== See also ==
- Foreign relations of India
- Sino-Soviet split (1953–1989)
- Foreign relations of the Soviet Union
- India–Russia relations
- Indian Society for Cultural Co-operation and Friendship
- Friends of the Soviet Union (India, 1981)
