= Duty Free Tariff Preference =

Duty Free Tariff Preference (DFTP) is a unilateral non-reciprocal preferential tariff scheme provided by the Government of India for the least developed countries (LDCs). The scheme was officially introduced on 13 August 2008. India was the first developing country to introduce a preferential tariff program for the LDCs.

Under the DFTP scheme, 98.2% of product categories originating from LDCs are offered duty free and preferential treatment. Only 1.8% of product categories imported into India from LDCs are subject to regular duties. As of March 2018, 31 LDCs benefit from the scheme. India made US$ 9.93 billion worth of imports from LDCs in 2016.

India also provides preferential market access to Bangladesh, Bhutan, Maldives and Nepal under the South Asia Free Trade Arrangement, and to Laos and Bangladesh under the Asia-Pacific Trade Agreement.

== Background ==
The World Trade Organization Hong Kong Ministerial Declaration of December 2005 required all developed countries, and developing countries who declared themselves in a position to do so, to extend duty-free and quota-free market access for products originating from the least developed countries (LDCs).

Prime Minister Manmohan Singh announced the introduction of the Duty Free Tariff Preference scheme at the first India–Africa Forum Summit in New Delhi on 8 April 2008. The scheme was officially introduced on 13 August 2008, and was notified to the World Trade Organization on 5 September 2011.

== Benefits ==
When the DFTP scheme was introduced in 2008, India committed to eliminating customs duties on over 85% of tariff lines (for items in the Harmonized System 6-digit level of classification), reducing duties on the basis of a prescribed margin of preference (Note: The margin of preference is the percentage difference between the most favoured nation (MFN) rate of duty and the preferential rate of duty) for 9% of tariff lines, and maintaining duties on the remaining 6% tariff lines over a period of 5 years. India had successfully met its pledge by 2012. The margin of preference granted for the 9% of tariff lines ranged from 10-90%.

Following consultations with beneficiary countries, the Ministry of Commerce and Industry revised the scheme in April 2014 to further boost exports from LDCs by eliminating tariffs on 98.2% of all tariff lines imported from LDCs. As a result, only 1.8% of tariff lines imported into India from LDCs are subject to duties. The most common items on the excluded list are vegetables and vegetable products, which accounted for 37% of the excluded items list, and prepared foodstuffs which accounted for 33%.

== Beneficiary countries ==
In order to become a beneficiary under the DFTP scheme, a prospective beneficiary country must provide a letter of intent and specimen seals and signatures of the officials authorised to issue the certificate of origin.

No.	Country	Date joined
1	Cambodia	13 August 2008
2	Tanzania	13 August 2008
3	Ethiopia	28 August 2008
4	Mozambique	28 August 2008
5	Samoa	28 August 2008
6	Malawi	28 August 2008
7	Laos	28 August 2008
8	Uganda	31 October 2008
9	Rwanda	31 October 2008
10	Madagascar	31 October 2008
11	Benin	19 January 2009
12	Myanmar	19 January 2009
13	Eritrea	19 January 2009
14	Burkina Faso	20 March 2009
15	Gambia	20 March 2009
16	Sudan	4 May 2009
17	Senegal	9 June 2009
18	Lesotho	6 August 2009
19	Mali	6 August 2009
20	Somalia	13 May 2010
21	Bangladesh	14 May 2010
22	Burundi	15 May 2010
23	East Timor	8 June 2010
24	Zambia	8 June 2010
25	Central African Republic	1 December 2010
26	Afghanistan	1 June 2011
27	Comoros	1 January 2012
28	Liberia	1 January 2012
29	Yemen	2 April 2013

=== Previous beneficiaries ===
Countries cease to become DFTP beneficiaries when they are no longer designated as LDCs by the United Nations, although the transition is not immediate and countries often continue to receive LDC benefits for a period even after they graduate from LDC status. Samoa and Equatorial Guinea which graduated in 2015 and 2017 continue to be beneficiaries.

Maldives graduated from LDC status in 2011 and was removed from the DFTP scheme in 2015. However, under article 12 of the South Asia Free Trade Agreement, Maldives is accorded LDC status in the agreement and in any subsequent contractual undertakings.

== See also ==
- Free trade agreements of India
