= APTA =

APTA or Apta can refer to:

- 9393 Apta, a main-belt asteroid discovered on August 10, 1994
- Apta, the name of Opatów, Poland, in Yiddish
- Apta (Hasidic dynasty), originated in Opatów
- a brand of cleaning products

== Documents ==
- Automotive Products Trade Agreement
- Asia-Pacific Trade Agreement

== Organizations ==
- Ajax Pickering Transit Authority, a former transit operator in Pickering and Ajax, Ontario, merged into Durham Region Transit in 2006
- American Physical Therapy Association
- American Public Transportation Association, an industry organization for transportation providers in the United States
- Asia-Pacific Trade Agreement
- Aptakisic-Tripp Community Consolidated School District 102, a school district in Illinois
- Apta railway station in India
