= India–United Kingdom Comprehensive Economic and Trade Agreement =

Proposed free trade agreement between India and the United Kingdom

Comprehensive Economic and Trade Agreement between the Republic of India and the United Kingdom of Great Britain and Northern Ireland
- India United Kingdom
- Type: Free trade agreement and Economic Integration Agreement
- Context: Trade agreement between India and the United Kingdom
- Drafted: 6 May 2025
- Signed: 24 July 2025
- Location: Chequers, Aylesbury, Buckinghamshire, England, United Kingdom
- Effective: 15 July 2026
- Negotiators: (India) Indian Commerce Minister: Piyush Goyal; (United Kingdom) British Trade Ministers: Anne-Marie Trevelyan (until 6 September 2022); Kemi Badenoch (until 5 July 2024); Jonathan Reynolds (from 5 July 2024)
- Signatories: Narendra Modi; Keir Starmer
- Parties: India; United Kingdom
- Language: English

The India–United Kingdom Comprehensive Economic and Trade Agreement, also referred to as the India–United Kingdom Free Trade Agreement, is a free trade agreement between India and the United Kingdom.

Negotiations began in January 2022. It is the second comprehensive free trade agreement that India had concluded with a European country, after EFTA; it is the third free trade agreement signed by the United Kingdom since leaving the European Union negotiated completely anew.

India and the United Kingdom concluded negotiations for an agreement in principle on 6 May 2025.

The agreement was signed by the two countries on 24 July 2025 and came into effect on 15 July 2026.

== Negotiations ==
India–UK FTA Round of Negotiations
Round	Dates	Location	Ref.
1	17–28 January 2022	Virtual meeting	
2	7–17 March 2022	London	
3	25 April–6 May 2022	New Delhi	
4	13–24 June 2022	London	
5	18–29 July 2022	New Delhi	
6	12–16 December 2022	New Delhi	
7	6–10 February 2023	London	
8	20–31 March 2023	New Delhi	
9	24–28 April 2023	London	
10	5–9 June 2023	New Delhi	
11	5–14 July 2023	London	
12	8–31 August 2023	New Delhi	
13	18 September–15 December 2023	London, New Delhi	
14	10 January–15 March 2024	London, New Delhi	
15	24 February 2025–6 May 2025	New Delhi	

In May 2021, British Prime Minister Boris Johnson and Indian Prime Minister Narendra Modi agreed deeper trade co-operation between the two countries. This “Enhanced Trade Partnership” removed a number of trade barriers and set out the two countries’ intention to work towards a free trade agreement.

India and the UK launched negotiations in January 2022. Johnson declared that the agreement should be completed by Diwali 2022. Despite this, in October 2022, the Secretary of State for International Trade, Kemi Badenoch, said that the Government was no longer working to this deadline. She stated that the Government wanted “to focus on the quality of the deal rather than the speed of the deal”.

By December 2023, the UK and India had reached the 13th round of negotiations, deciding to fast track the agreement in order to complete prior to the elections in both countries the following year. Negotiations between both countries are locked in several issues, one of which is the UK's concerns about agreeing to visas for professionals demanded by India. The thirteenth round of negotiations concluded on 18 December 2023.

The fourteenth round of negotiations began on 10 January 2024. India had been pushing to include social security payments for Indian workers in the UK, Badenoch is reportedly “keen to avoid” this. In March, UK Negotiators flew to India in a “last-gasp attempt to clinch an FTA before the Indian election campaign pauses talks”, according to a UK government official, adding that India believes “they will get more out of Labour on visas and social security”. Shadow Secretary of State for Business and Trade Jonathan Reynolds and Shadow Foreign Secretary David Lammy visited India the month prior to talk with Indian officials. The UK is asking for access in India's government procurement as well as signing a bilateral investment treaty before concluding the FTA. Some British trade officials are increasingly pessimistic about the India deal and see a free trade agreement with the Gulf Cooperation Council as a more realistic deal which can be struck prior to the next election. The fourteenth round of negotiations remain open without a breakthrough on major outstanding issues between the two countries, India became primarily focused on their upcoming general election. Badenoch stated that she would not use the Indian elections as a deadline, just prior to India signing a free trade agreement with the European Free Trade Association, whose members include Iceland, Liechtenstein, Norway, and Switzerland. On 12 March, Modi and British Prime Minister Rishi Sunak agreed to work for an early conclusion of the free trade agreement, during a phone call.

On 15 March, it was announced that negotiations will be "put on ice" until spring after India's election concludes. At the beginning of April, the Indian Ministry of Commerce and Industry placed the completion of India–UK FTA as their priority for 100-day agenda after a new government takes charge. Despite the fourteenth round being declared the prior month, the round remained open by request of India in April 2024; India demanded an exemption from the UK's planned carbon tax, as well as concessions on visas for Indian workers and, a social security agreement. On 28 May, a high-ranking British delegation had abruptly cancelled its scheduled visit to New Delhi, due to the snap election announcement in the UK a few days prior.

By Spring 2024, the majority of the 26 chapters in the FTA, which include goods, services, investments and intellectual property rights were completed; the remainder of the unresolved issues were rules of origin, duty concessions on electric vehicles, Scotch whisky, social security agreement, carbon border tax, and liberalisation of financial services, in addition to a separate bilateral investment treaty.

Following Modi's re-election on 4 June, which was received positively by UK-based strategic experts and poll watchers, Modi maintained his party's stated objective to conclude the UK-India FTA negotiations within those first 100 days. India had to wait until 4 July for the conclusion of the British general election, in order to resume negotiations for the FTA. On 14 June, Modi and Sunak reaffirmed their commitment to concluding the free trade agreement at a bilateral meeting during the 50th G7 summit. Upon the election of Sir Keir Starmer as British Prime Minister, the two leaders agreed to work towards early conclusion of a mutually beneficial FTA during a phone call. During a visit to New Delhi in late July, Foreign Secretary David Lammy and Modi committed to an early conclusion for the FTA under the Starmer government.

At the 2024 G20 Rio de Janeiro summit, Starmer and Modi agreed to relaunch negotiations for an FTA in early 2025, Starmer also proposed upgrading bilateral relations by seeking a new Strategic Partnership covering energy and security. FTA talks were relaunched on 14 January 2025. On 9 April 2025, Chancellor Rachel Reeves and Finance Minister Nirmala Sitharaman announced that 90% of the trade agreement had been completed, including mobility visas for Indian workers which had been one of the most contentious negotiation issues; the outstanding issues related to whisky, cars, and pharmaceuticals. It was reported on 27 April 2025, that India had watered down its original requests in regards to visas. On 29 April 2025, Piyush Goyal declared that “25 of 26 matters have been agreed.” On 6 May 2025, Prime Minister Modi announced that an agreement had been reached between India and the United Kingdom.

== Areas covered in the United Kingdom-India Free Trade Agreement ==
The United Kingdom-India Comprehensive Economic and Trade Agreement (CETA) contains 30 chapters covering trade in goods and services, digital trade, government procurement, business mobility, intellectual property and regulatory standards.

=== Trade in goods ===
==== Tariff reductions and exemptions ====
When the agreement enters into force, 64% of UK product categories exported to India immediately become duty-free, increasing to 85% over 10 years to cover two-thirds of existing UK exports. Across all tariff lines, India removes or reduces duties on 90%, covering 92% of goods currently exported from the UK to India.

Indian import duties on several key UK exports are reduced:

- Spirits: Tariffs on UK whisky and gin fall from 150% to 75% when the agreement takes effect and gradually decline to 40% by Year 10.
- Cars: Tariffs on UK cars, previously up to 110%, are reduced to 10% under a tariff quota. The quota gradually shifts over time from internal combustion engines toward electric and hybrid vehicles.
- Cosmetics and toiletries: Tariffs of up to 22% on UK cosmetics and toiletries are removed immediately or gradually over 10 years.

In return, the UK removes tariffs on 99% of Indian goods, providing duty-free access for major exports, including frozen shrimp, apparel and textiles.

==== Sector exclusions ====
Both countries retained tariff protections for sensitive domestic sectors:

- The UK maintains full tariff protections on agricultural items, including sugar, milled rice, pork, chicken, and eggs.
- India keeps protective tariffs on its domestic dairy sector.

==== Rules of origin, customs and safeguards ====
In order to qualify for preferential tariff rates, goods must be completely obtained or significantly transformed within either country. Under a specific rule of origin, spirits distilled in Northern Ireland using imported grain qualify for preferential tariffs and could be bottled during their journey to India. Under the agreement, customs authorities must release shipments within 48 hours if no physical inspection is needed, and also publish all administrative guidance online in English. In addition to this, the agreement also allows either country to temporarily increase tariffs or withdraw tariff reductions if lower tariffs cause, or risk causing, serious harm to domestic producers in their respective countries.

=== Trade in services and investment ===
==== Market access for services ====
The agreement provides equal access to specified service sectors, including telecommunications, construction and environmental services. In the sectors covered under the agreement, UK businesses are treated like Indian businesses and are not subjected to limits or quotas on the number of service suppliers. In addition to this, British businesses do not need to be based in India or register as Indian businesses in order to provide services in these sectors.

==== Financial and professional services ====
- Financial services: India sets a foreign direct investment limit of 74% for UK ownership of Indian insurance and banking companies.
- Professional qualifications: The agreement establishes a Professional Services Working Group in order to support cooperation between British and Indian regulators and to also encourage agreements on the mutual recognition of professional qualifications.

Industry groups and witnesses that appeared before parliamentary committees said that the agreement largely maintains existing conditions for services instead of providing new market access. John Cooke of TheCityUK said that the agreement was “much more about confirming existing conditions of access”, whilst William Bain of the British Chambers of Commerce similarly said that it provided little new market access for services.

=== Government procurement ===
==== Access to Indian public contracts ====
The agreement gives British businesses access to Indian central government procurement contracts which cover goods, services and construction. This market includes about 40,000 public tenders each year, with an estimated total value of £38 billion.

==== Treatment under 'Make in India' rules ====
The agreement also gives UK businesses supplier status under India’s “Make in India” public procurement framework policy. UK businesses offering goods or services with at least 20% UK content qualify as Class 2 suppliers which allows them to bid on the same terms as Indian businesses that do not have Class 1 status.

=== Business mobility and social security ===
The agreement sets permanent, clear rules for short-term business travel, company transfers, and contracted service workers between the UK and India. It also expands worker routes in specific industries, creating a dedicated quota of 1,800 annual visas for Indian chefs, yoga teachers, and classical musicians. In addition to this, self-employed Indian professionals can apply for temporary visas to fill contracts in selected sectors. Under the agreement, these rules apply only to temporary business travel and do not change general UK immigration policy, student post-study work rights, or routes to permanent settlement in the UK. A related agreement, the Double Contributions Convention, prevents temporary workers sent to work in the other country for up to 3 years, and their employers, from having to pay social security contributions in both countries.

=== Intellectual property, digital trade, and innovation ===
==== Intellectual property protections ====
The agreement sets intellectual property (IP) standards that go beyond the basic requirements of the World Trade Organization’s Agreement on Trade-Related Aspects of Intellectual Property Rights (TRIPS). Key commitments include:

- Enforces protections across patents, trade secrets, trademarks, and copyright with it including a commitment by India to review terms of copyright protection and royalty rights for creators.
- Lets the UK to apply for India's highest tier of Geographical Indications protection across all eligible product categories, with it extending these protections beyond traditional wines and spirits.
- Reduces administrative delays in patent processing in order to improve legal certainty and transparency for businesses.

==== Digital trade ====
The digital trade chapter of the agreement sets rules to simplify and secure cross-border e-commerce:

- Guarantees legal recognition for electronic contracts, signatures, and digital authentication methods.
- Prohibits governments from requiring the forced transfer or disclosure of software source code as a condition for entering their respective country market.
- Introduces measures to reduce unsolicited commercial electronic communications like spam through user consent rules or clear sender identification.

==== Cooperation to innovate ====
In order to support technological development and research, the agreement establishes a joint Innovation Working Group. This Group brings together government, industry, academia and civil society to work towards resolving regulatory trade barriers, strengthening supply chain resilience, and supporting the commercialisation of new technologies.

=== Regulatory standards, sustainability, and governance ===
==== Food safety, health, and animal welfare ====
The agreement maintains the UK's existing rules on food safety, animal health and animal welfare. It also establishes formal bilateral cooperation between the two countries on international animal welfare standards and joint efforts to combat antimicrobial resistance.

==== Labour and environmental protections ====
Standalone chapters in the agreement cover international labour rights and environmental cooperation:

- The agreement reaffirms commitments to International Labour Organization standards, the enforcement of labour laws and the prohibition of forced labour.
- Reaffirms climate goals under the Paris Agreement, supports the clean energy transition, and promotes trade in environmental goods and services.
- Aims to operate in a cooperative, facilitative basis and is excluded from formal state-to-state dispute settlement.

==== Governance, state-owned enterprises and anti-corruption ====
The agreement introduces shared governance rules in order to ensure fair competition and transparency:

- Requires non-discriminatory enforcement of competition laws and procedural fairness for businesses under investigation.
- Promotes corporate governance principles for state-owned enterprises in order to ensure they operate on commercial principles without unfair government advantages.
- Incorporates anti-corruption commitments which are aligned with the United Nations Convention against Corruption, with it prohibiting bribery, money laundering, embezzlement, and fraudulent bookkeeping.

==== Agreement oversight and dispute resolution ====
Implementation and administration of the agreement between both countries are managed through specific oversight bodies:

- Establishes a Joint Committee to oversee overall agreement implementation alongside the establishment of a dedicated Sustainability Subcommittee to monitor the agreement's environmental and labour commitments.
- Applies a binding state-to-state dispute settlement mechanism for the purpose of resolving formal compliance disputes under the agreement.

== Impact ==
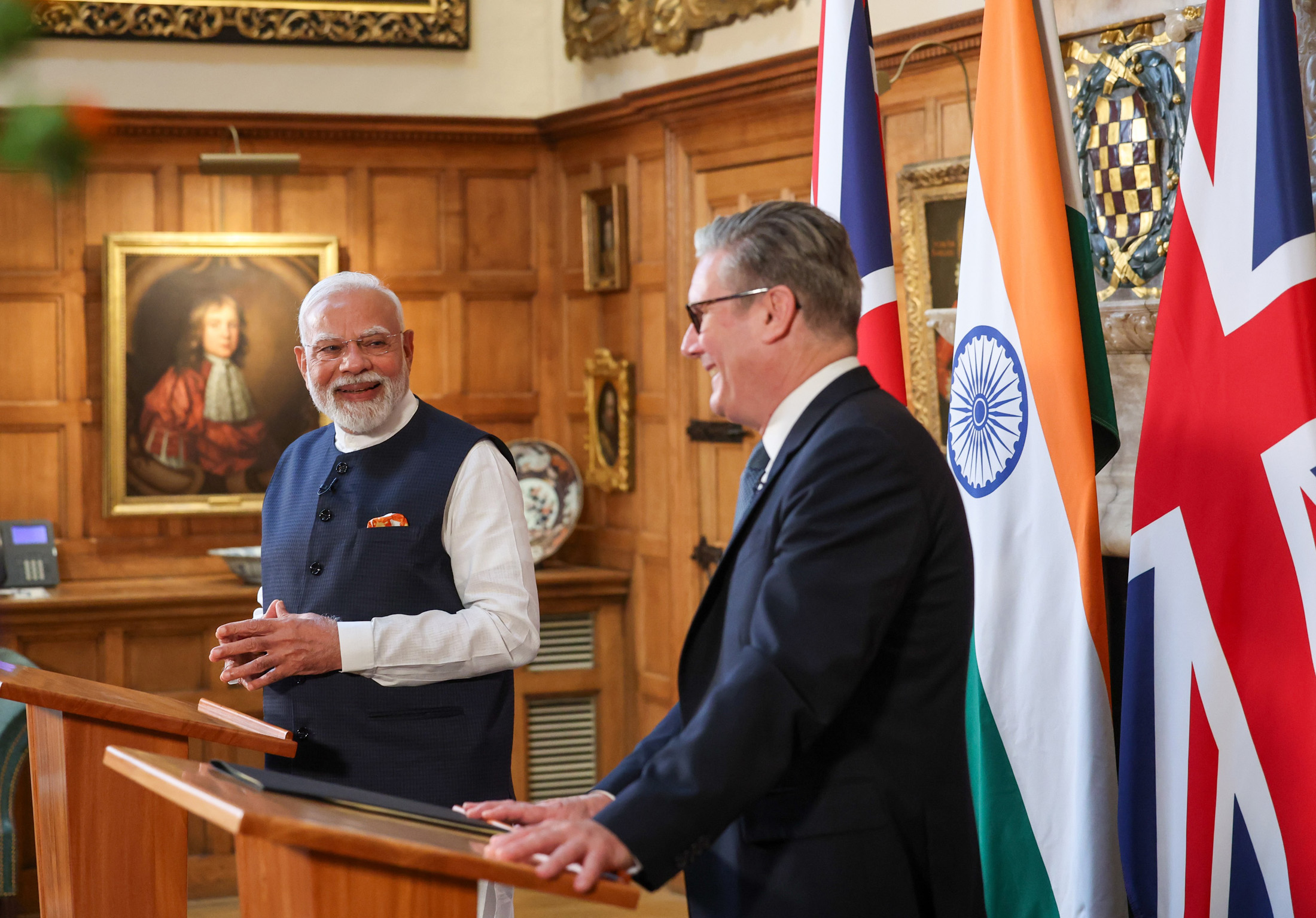
Indian Prime Minister Narendra Modi and UK Prime Minister Keir Starmer on 24 July 2025

The agreement resulted in a significant boost to bilateral economic relations, with over £1.3 billion in new investments from 64 Indian companies into the United Kingdom. This investment created approximately 6,900 jobs across various UK regions and sectors, including engineering, technology, and the creative industries. The agreement enhanced investor confidence, reduced tariffs on imports between the two countries, and reinforced India's position as the UK's second-largest investor, contributing to domestic economic growth and strengthening UK-India trade ties.

The deal is expected to increase the UK's gross domestic product by £4.8 billion annually and boost bilateral trade with India by an additional £25.5 billion per year by 2040.

=== Overall economic impact ===
Government economic modelling estimates that the agreement will boost long-term UK gross domestic product (GDP) by 0.13% (around £4.8 billion annually in 2024 prices) by 2040. Government estimates suggest that the agreement could produce a larger long-term increase in GDP than other post-Brexit free trade agreements negotiated independently by the UK, including those with Australia, New Zealand and CPTPP members.

UK government estimates suggest that the agreement could increase annual trade between the UK and India by £25.5 billion, with this including a £15.7 billion increase in UK exports. Total annual wages in the UK are projected to rise by £2.2 billion. UK government estimates suggest that lower tariffs could save UK exporters up to £400 million a year when the agreement takes effect, with this increasing to £900 million annually after ten years of phased reductions. However, official impact assessments state that these long-term projections are subject to uncertainty.

=== Economic impact by region and sector ===
Economic modelling projects an increase in real gross value added (GVA) across all UK nations and regions. However, the estimated effects are expected to vary by location and industry:

- Regional growth: Economic modelling projects the largest percentage increases in output in the West Midlands, at 0.13% (£190 million), followed by the North East, at 0.12% (£70 million), and Scotland, at 0.12% (£190 million). Meanwhile, economic modelling projects the smallest percentage increases in output for London, at 0.06% (£310 million), followed by the South West, at 0.10% (£150 million), and the South East, at 0.10% (£300 million).
- Sectoral changes: Of the 23 UK economic sectors included in the modelling, 16 are projected to expand and 7 to contract. The largest projected increases are expected to be in machinery and equipment manufacturing, at 1.7%; beverages and tobacco, at 1.5%; and motor vehicle production, at 0.5%. At the same time, the largest projected decreases are expected to be in textiles, clothing and leather, at 0.7%, and other transport equipment manufacturing, at 0.4%.

=== Growth in goods exports and certainty ===
Economic projections suggest that tariff-free access across 99% of UK tariff lines could help Indian textile and clothing exporters compete with exporters from Bangladesh and Vietnam. The change could support increased production in manufacturing centres including Tiruppur, Surat, Ludhiana, Panipat, and Bhadohi. The removal of tariffs could also provide opportunities for Indian exporters in the UK’s engineering and seafood markets, valued at $193.5 billion and $4.9 billion, respectively.

In addition to this, research by the Centre for Inclusive Trade Policy suggests that replacing temporary trade preferences with a legally binding agreement could reduce long-term policy uncertainty for businesses. The Centre for Inclusive Trade Policy estimates that greater policy certainty could lower trade costs by 2.3% and increase Indian goods exports to the UK by an average of 9%, even without tariff reductions. Research by the Centre for Inclusive Trade Policy estimates that removing trade policy uncertainty could increase Indian exports to the UK by 29.0% in rubber and plastics, 28.5% in fishing and aquaculture, 25.6% in motor vehicles, 25.0% in textiles and clothing, and 20.6% in chemicals, independently of tariff reductions.

==== Services, professional mobility and social security savings ====
TheCityUK and the British Chambers of Commerce have said that the agreement by in large maintains existing market access in the services sector rather than providing substantial new access. India's Ministry of Commerce estimates that the Double Contributions Convention, which stops temporary workers sent to the other country for up to 3 years and their employers from paying social security contributions in both countries, could potentially benefit more than 75,000 Indian professionals and 900 employers on a yearly basis. India's Ministry of Commerce estimates savings of more than $600 million on a yearly basis.

=== Environment and climate ===
Official impact assessments estimate that the added economic activity linked with the agreement could increase total UK greenhouse gas emissions by 0.21%, which is equal to around 0.2 MtCO2e. Official impact assessments also estimate that increased cargo emissions between the two countries (India and the UK) could increase emissions related to transport by between 43% and 49%, or 1.3 to 2.5% MtCO2e. The Trade Justice Movement has raised that these estimated increases may conflict with the transition to net zero. Indian exports of carbon-intensive goods, including steel, iron and fertilisers, will remain subject to the UK Carbon Border Adjustment Mechanism from 2027. Global Justice Now has said that the agreement's intellectual property provisions could affect India's generic medicines industry and could potentially increase medicine costs for the UK National Health Service over the longer term.

== Comments ==
Diageo India CEO, Hina Nagarajan stated that the FTA would be one of the greatest milestones for market access in the alcoholic beverage industry in decades if the 150% duty levied on imported Scotch whisky is reduced.

UK Business and Trade Secretary Peter Kyle stated that India's position as the world's fourth-largest economy presented major opportunities for British businesses, highlighted by billions in investment supporting thousands of UK jobs. He noted that the UK-India trade agreement further strengthened bilateral ties and contributed to economic growth across the UK.

Starmer faced questions regarding India's continued purchase of Russian fossil fuels, stating that he respects India's "strategic independence."

Following the finalisation of the agreement in May 2025, the deal faced domestic political criticism in the United Kingdom regarding the exemption of National Insurance contributions (NICs) for short-term Indian workers. Senior Conservative politicians and Reform UK leader Nigel Farage criticised the concession. Farage argued that Prime Minister Starmer had "sold out British workers to the highest degree" and stated that the provision would incentivise employers to hire foreign personnel over domestic labour. Kemi Badenoch, the Leader of the Conservative Party and former Business Secretary, characterised the arrangement as creating a "two-tier" tax system. Critics argued that the exemption, which applied to Indian personnel seconded to the UK for up to three years, placed British workers at a disadvantage by making foreign recruitment more financially attractive for employers, particularly following domestic increases to employer NICs.

== See also ==
- Free trade agreements of India
- Free trade agreements of the United Kingdom
- India–European Union Free Trade Agreement
- India–United Kingdom relations
