= Euro-India Research Centre =

International research collaboration

Euro-India Research Centre (EIRC) is an information and service platform to facilitate collaboration between Indian and European organisations (from industry and academia) for conducting joint research and technology development, and was funded by FP7, the European Commission's largest funding programme.

EIRC is also the Functional Arm of the Information and Communication Technology (ICT) National Contact Point (NCP) Network of India. EIRC not only operates in the ICT sector but also in the environment, energy and biotechnology sectors covered under FP7.

EIRC helps Indian organisations access and benefit from EU funding in Research and Development. EIRC serves as a platform for co-operation between India and the European Union that promotes co-operation at a research level.

In India, the National Contact Point (NCP) is the entity that supports the scientific and business communities in accessing European funds for Research and Development. The Ministry of Information Technology (MIT) was chosen by the Indian government as NCP for ICT co-operation with the European Union. MIT was supported by the Indian Research Support Network (IRSN).
