= India–European Union Free Trade Agreement =

2026 trade pact between India and the European Union

Free Trade Agreement between the Republic of India and the European Union
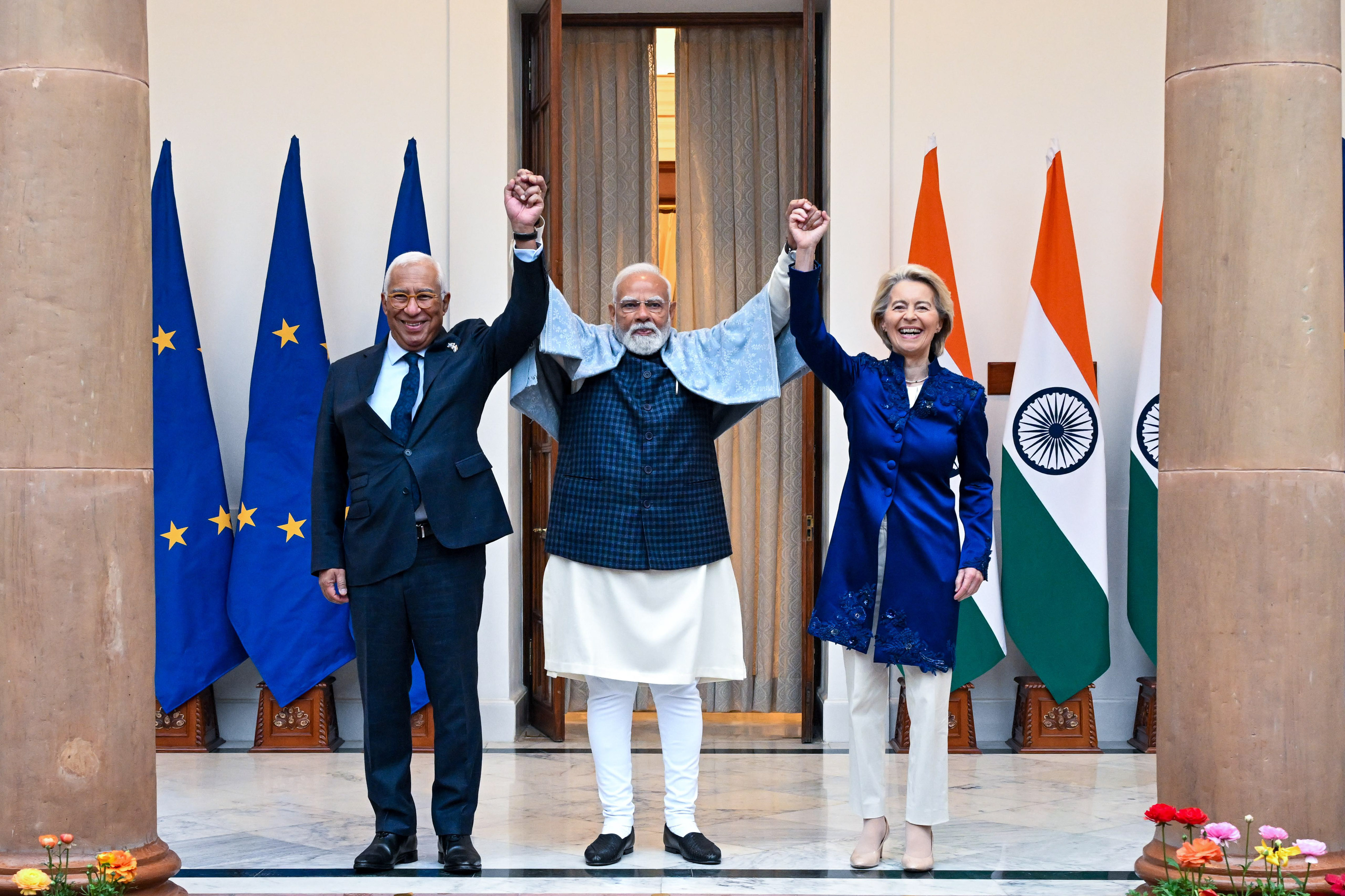
- António Costa, Narendra Modi, and Ursula von der Leyen during the India-EU Summit.
- Type: Free trade agreement
- Location: Hyderabad House, New Delhi, India
- Condition: Approval by the Council of the European Union, consent of the European Parliament, and the completion of approval by the Union Council of Ministers in India
- Negotiators: Piyush Goyal; Maroš Šefčovič
- Parties: India; European Union
- Languages: English

The India–European Union Free Trade Agreement (simply called the India–EU FTA) is a comprehensive free trade agreement concluded between the Republic of India and the European Union (EU) on 27 January 2026, following negotiations that spanned nearly two decades. The agreement was announced at an India–European Union summit in New Delhi and aims to liberalise trade and investment between the two economies through phased commitments covering goods, services, and regulatory cooperation.

In contemporary media coverage, political leaders from both sides described the pact as the "mother of all deals", a phrase used in public statements rather than in the formal treaty text. As of its announcement, the agreement was subject to legal vetting and translation before formal signing. Before entering into force, the agreement requires an approval by the Council of the European Union, consent of the European Parliament, and the approval of the Union Council of Ministers in India.

== Background ==
Negotiations for a comprehensive trade agreement between India and the European Union began in 2007 under the framework of a Broad-based Trade and Investment Agreement. Talks stalled in 2013 due to disagreements over tariffs, market access, intellectual property rights, and regulatory standards. Negotiations were officially relaunched in July 2022 amid renewed strategic and economic cooperation between India and the EU.

The negotiations covered multiple chapters including trade in goods and services, investment protection, sustainable development, intellectual property rights, digital trade, and dispute settlement mechanisms. In February 2025, India and the European Union set a target to conclude negotiations by the end of the year, following talks between Prime Minister Narendra Modi and European Commission president Ursula von der Leyen. In September 2025, European Commission vice-president Kaja Kallas voiced support for closer trade and security relations between the EU and India, while criticizing India's close cooperation with Russia, including its participation in the Zapad 2025 military exercise.

In January 2026, amid negotiations, both EU Commission president Ursula von der Leyen and Indian trade minister Piyush Goyal described it as the "mother of all trade deals". Additionally, von der Leyen also stated at the 2026 World Economic Forum that the trade deal would create "a free market of two billion people, accounting for a quarter of global GDP". By January 2026, agreement had been reached on about 20 of the 24 negotiating chapters.

Under a trade agreement in September 2026, India can send up to 1.64 million metric tons of steel to the EU each year, but India companies must still pay European carbon taxes and tariffs.

=== Conclusion of negotiations ===
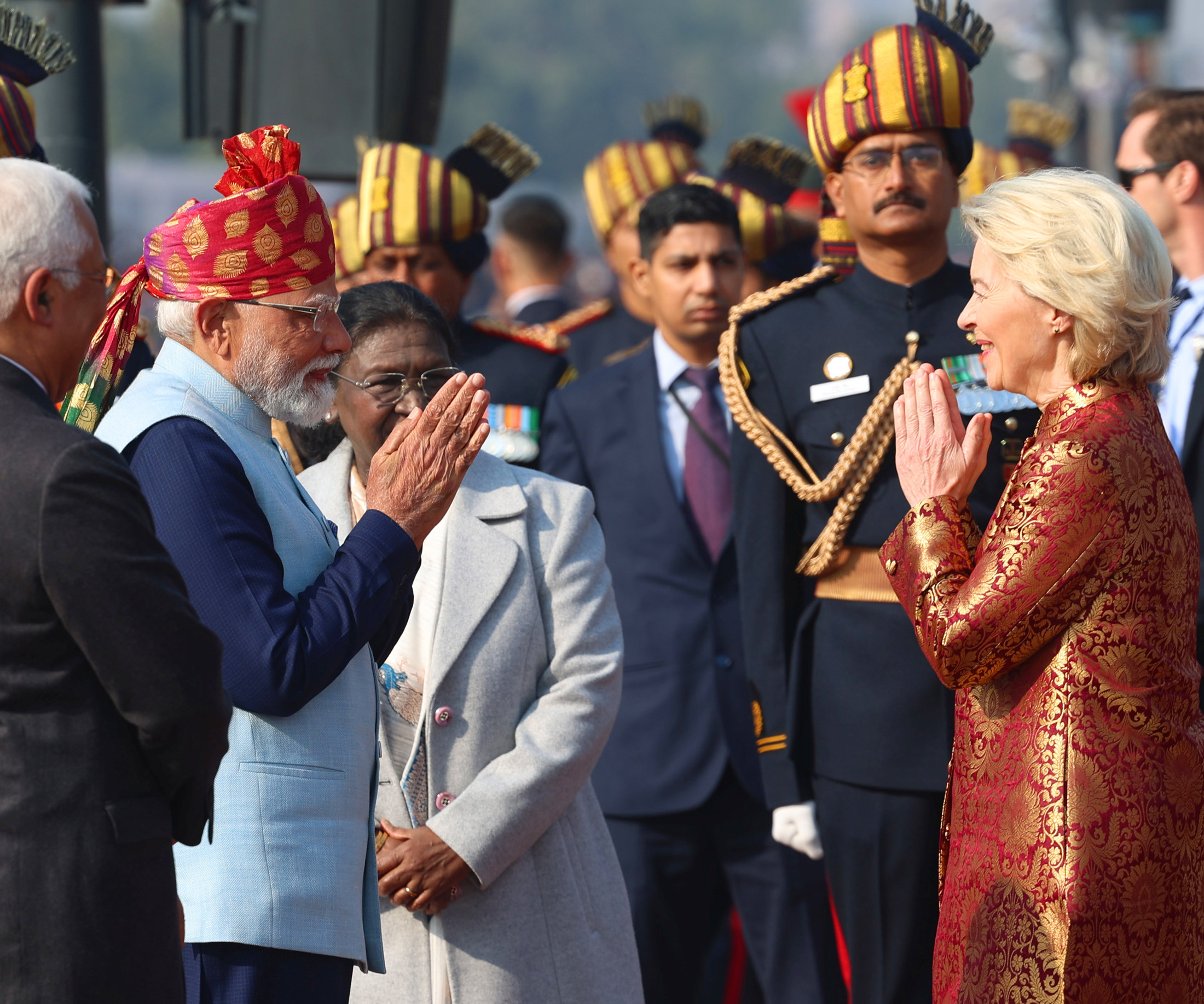
Narendra Modi and Ursula von der Leyen in New Delhi on 26 January 2026

The agreement was announced at an India–European Union summit at Hyderabad House in New Delhi on 27 January 2026 after the negotiations had been concluded the previous night. India was represented at the summit by prime minister Narendra Modi and the European Union by European Commission president Ursula von der Leyen and European Council President António Costa. Von der Leyen and Costa had attended India's Republic Day celebrations as chief guests the previous day.

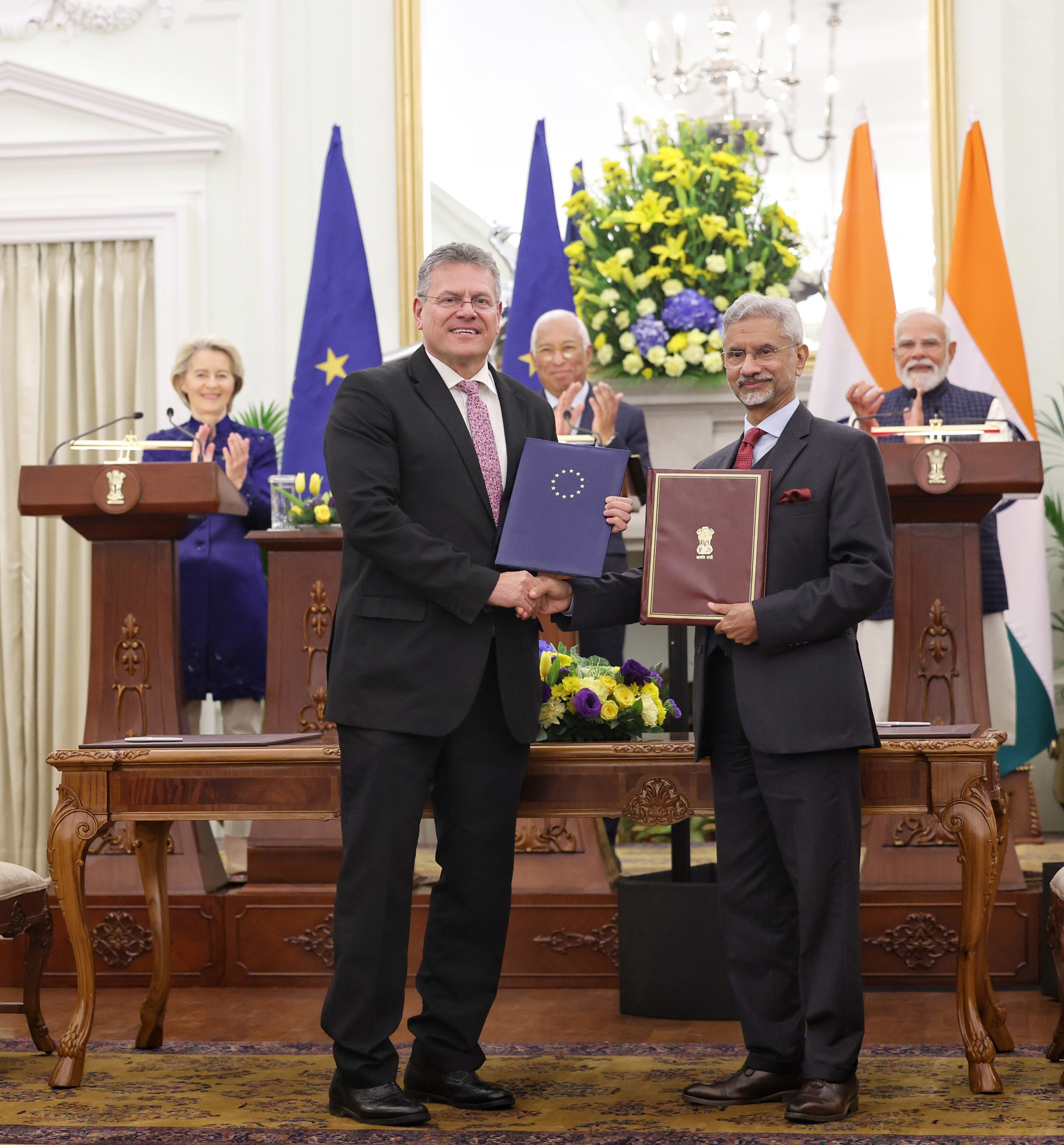
Exchange of MOUs Between India and EU.

Narendra Modi remarked that a "big agreement" was signed between India and EU and that "people around the world" called it "the mother of all deals." He stated that the agreement would bring "major opportunities for the 1.4 billion people of India and the millions of people in Europe." Ursula von der Leyen called the agreement "the mother of all deals" and said that "we have created a free trade zone of 2 billion people, with both sides set to benefit."

In addition to the free trade deal, several other agreements were reached between India and the EU at the summit. Under a Security and Defence Partnership, India and the EU will enhance cooperation in maritime security, counterterrorism, cyberdefense, and defence procurement. A mobility and migration agreement between India and the EU was also signed at the summit. This agreement, finalized alongside a free trade agreement, is set to substantially enhance legal pathways to the EU for Indian students and skilled workers.

== Key provisions ==
The India–European Union Free Trade Agreement establishes a framework for liberalising trade in goods and services, facilitating investment, and enhancing regulatory and sustainability cooperation. Publicly available information on the agreement’s contents was based on official briefings and reporting by international news organisations, pending publication of the final legal text and annexes. Both parties committed to phased tariff reductions covering a substantial majority of goods traded by value, with exclusions and transitional arrangements for domestically sensitive sectors. Media reports indicated that tariff liberalisation would be implemented gradually over several years rather than immediately upon entry into force of the agreement.

Area	Reported provisions
Trade in goods	Phased elimination or reduction of tariffs on a large majority of goods by trade value, with safeguards and exclusions for sensitive sectors
Industrial products	Gradual reduction of high tariffs on selected industrial goods, including automobiles, machinery, chemicals, and pharmaceuticals
Agriculture	Preferential access for certain agricultural and processed food products, while excluding dairy, cereals, and other sensitive items
Services and investment	Commitments on services market access and investment facilitation, alongside regulatory cooperation
Labour mobility	A parallel framework reported to address mobility for skilled professionals, researchers, and students
Sustainability	Provisions for dialogue and cooperation on environmental standards and climate-related regulatory issues
Trade facilitation	Measures relating to customs procedures, rules of origin, and regulatory transparency

Reporting cited tariff liberalisation affecting over 90 per cent of traded goods by value, although specific product-level schedules, timelines, and legally binding commitments were expected to be clarified following publication of the treaty text and associated annexes.

== Ratification and implementation ==
The agreement is subject to legal vetting and translation before formal signing. The agreement requires an approval by the Council of the European Union under a qualified majority vote, consent of the European Parliament, and completion of domestic approval processes in India before entering into force. Trade liberalisation measures are expected to be phased in over several years. The agreement can come into force by early 2027.

== Economic significance ==
The European Commission stated that the agreement would cut or eliminate tariffs on almost 97 percent of European exports to India, saving up to €4 billion annually in duties. It also stated that it expected its exports to India to double by 2032 as a result of the deal. India reportedly planned to cut tariffs on cars imported from the EU to 40% from levels of up to 110% as part of negotiations toward the agreement. The government agreed to immediately lower duties on a limited number of EU-made cars priced above €15,000, with tariffs set to decline further to 10% over time, improving market access for European manufacturers including Volkswagen, Mercedes-Benz and BMW. Both the EU and India stated that India would lower tariffs on up to 250,000 cars imported from the EU, a move expected to provide some relief for Europe’s automotive industry facing pressure.

The agreement removes tariffs on a range of EU exports, including fruit juices, processed foods, olive oil and other vegetable oils, and reduces duties on spirits to 40%. It also eliminates tariffs on most European optical, medical, surgical, aircraft, and spacecraft exports to India. Most tariffs, including duties of up to 44% on machinery, 22% on chemicals, and 11% on pharmaceuticals, would be eliminated. The agreement is expected to significantly boost India’s textile, apparel, leather, and footwear sectors by eliminating EU tariffs of up to 12–17%, placing Indian exporters on par with competitors such as Bangladesh, Vietnam, Pakistan, and Turkey, which previously enjoyed zero-duty access, and narrowing the competitiveness gap with other low-cost producers. Commerce Minister Piyush Goyal also stated that Indian textile exports had the potential to grow from $7 billion to $30-40 billion "very quickly."

== Analysis ==
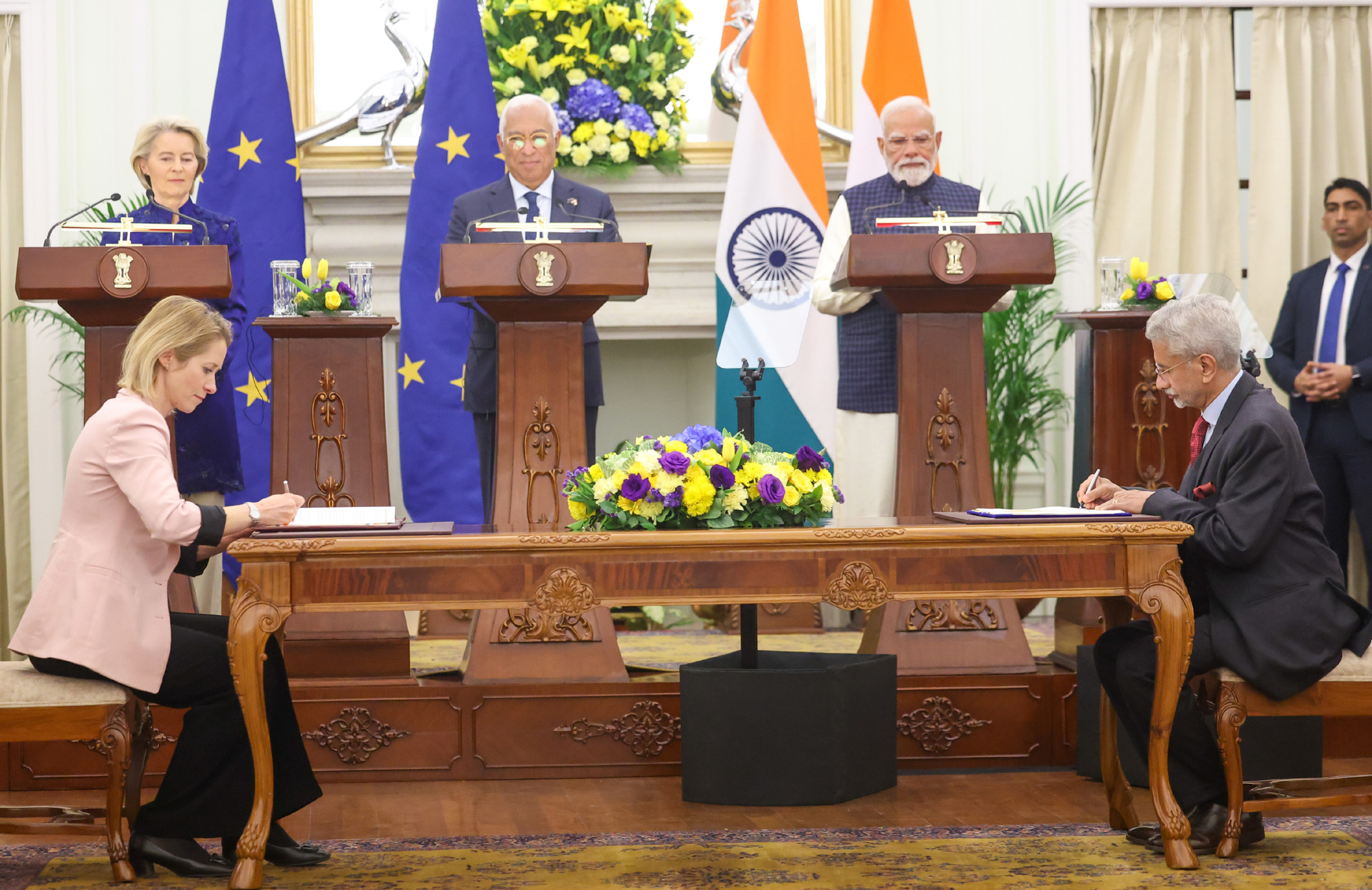
Kaja Kallas and S. Jaishankar signing a Security and Defence Partnership in New Delhi on 27 January 2026

Jefferies Group analysts noted that India had secured preferential access across 97% of EU tariff lines, covering nearly 99.5% of trade value, meaning about 91% of Indian exports to the EU would face no import duties from the agreement’s entry into force.

Both India and the EU sought reliable trade partners amid geopolitical uncertainty, with India looking to offset the impact of US tariffs and the EU aiming to reduce its trade dependence on China, according to Sumedha Dasgupta of the Economist Intelligence Unit, who said the agreement would reflect India’s continued move away from its traditionally protectionist policies.

Amid trade negotiations, India's Republic Day 2026 invite to Ursula von der Leyen and European Council President António Costa also conveyed a diplomatic message, highlighting India’s efforts to expand strategic and trade relations worldwide as the dispute over US’s 50% tariffs on Indian goods from 2025 extended into 2026. Chietigj Bajpaee of the Chatham House said the move signaled that India maintained a diversified foreign policy and was "not beholden to the whims of the Trump administration."

== See also ==
- Free trade agreements of India
- Free trade agreements of the European Union
- India–European Union relations
- India–EFTA Trade and Economic Partnership Agreement
