= Asia-Pacific Trade Agreement =

Trade agreement formerly known as Bangkok Agreement

- APTA members
- Type: Trade agreement
- Signed: 1975; 51 years ago
- Parties: 7; Bangladesh; China; India; Laos; Mongolia; South Korea; Sri Lanka

The Asia-Pacific Trade Agreement (APTA), previously known as the Bangkok Agreement and renamed 2 November 2005, was signed in 1975. It is the oldest preferential trade agreement between countries in the Asia-Pacific region. The APTA market covers 2.7 billion people and accounted for US$15 trillion in terms of gross domestic product in Fiscal Year 2015–2016. APTA’s key objective is to hasten economic development among the seven participating states opting trade and investment liberalization measures that will contribute to intra-regional trade and economic strengthening through the coverage of merchandise goods and services, synchronized investment regime and free flow of technology transfer making all the Participating States to be in equally winsome situation. Its aim is to promote economic development and cooperation through the adoption of trade liberalization measures. APTA is open to all members of the United Nations Economic and Social Commission for Asia and the Pacific, which serves as the APTA Secretariat. Members of APTA are currently participating in the Fourth Round of Tariff Concessions, which are expected to conclude in October 2009.

== Member nations ==
- Bangladesh (original member, 1975)
- China (acceded in 2000)
- India (original member, 1975)
- Republic of Korea (original member, 1975)
- Lao People's Democratic Republic (original member, 1975)
- Sri Lanka (original member, 1975)
- Mongolia (acceded in 2013, full membership in 2020)

== Negotiations ==
=== Exchange of Tariff Concessions ===
The Third Round, entering into force on 1 September 2006, led to tariff concessions on more than 4,000 items.

The Fourth Round, launched in October 2007, was scheduled to be concluded by the Third Ministerial Council in October 2009. This Round aims to widen the coverage of preferences to at least 50 per cent of the number of tariff lines of each member, and at least 20-25 per cent the value of bilateral trade. It also aims to provide a tariff concession of at least 50 per cent (on average).

=== Framework Agreement ===
The Fourth Round of negotiations is extending into areas beyond the traditional tariff concessions in order to deepen trade cooperation and integration. APTA members are currently negotiating three framework agreements on trade facilitation, trade in services, and investments. In addition, APTA members are exchanging information on non-tariff measures.

== Institutional arrangements ==
- Ministerial Council: The Ministerial Council represents the highest decision-making authority. It provides overall policy direction for the future negotiating agenda of the Agreement, as well as supervision and coordination of the implementation of the Agreement. The Council meets at least once every two years, with the First Session held on 2 November 2005 in Beijing, China, and the Second Session held on 26 October 2007 in Goa, India. The Third Session held on 22 October 2009 in Seoul, Republic of Korea.
- Standing Committee: APTA is administered by a Standing Committee. Each Participating State designates a national focal point and an alternate focal point responsible for handling this duty.
- Secretariat: The Trade and Investment Division of UNESCAP functions as APTA’s Secretariat.

== See also ==
- Asia-Pacific Trade Agreements Database
- Asian Clearing Union
- United Nations Economic and Social Commission for Asia and the Pacific
- Rules of Origin
- Market access
- Free-trade area
- Tariffs

Other trade agreements and organizations in the Asia–Pacific region

- ASEAN Free Trade Area (AFTA)
- South Pacific Regional Trade and Economic Co-operation Agreement (SPARTECA)
- South Asian Free Trade Area (SAFTA)
- Pacific Islands Forum (PIF)
- Bay of Bengal Initiative for Multi-Sectoral Technical and Economic Cooperation (BIMSTEC)
- Commonwealth of Independent States Free Trade Area (CISFTA)
