= India–Latvia relations =

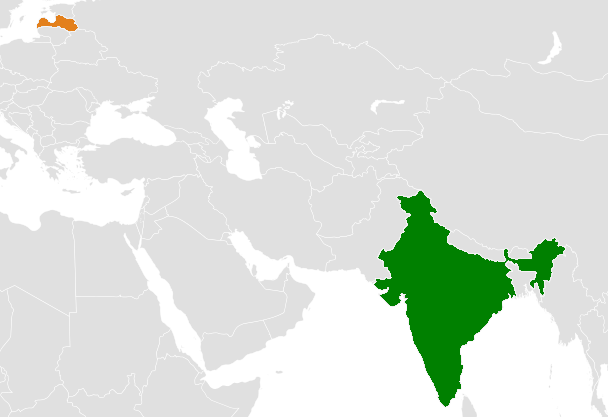

- India: Latvia

India–Latvia relations refer to the bilateral relations between India and the Latvia. The two countries established diplomatic relations in 1991, following the independence of Latvia. Latvia opened an Embassy in New Delhi in 2014. The Embassy of India was opened in Riga 25 July 2024. H.E Ambassador Namrata S. Kumar took charge as the first resident Ambassador of India to Latvia in March 2025.

== Economic relations ==
In 2013, Latvia and India signed an agreement avoiding double taxation, which increased Indian exports to Latvia in term of economic benefits between two nations. Currently two countries are discussing on building a closer and deeper cooperation in transports and logistics.

India sees Latvia – along with Estonia and Lithuania – as strategic partners of Indian interests in the Baltics.

== High-level visits ==
In 2017, Latvian Prime Minister Māris Kučinskis visited India to accelerate the development of economic relations between the countries.

In 2019, Indian Vice President Venkaiah Naidu also visited Latvia and held talks with the Latvian leaders.

== Resident diplomatic missions ==
- India is accredited to Latvia from its embassy in Stockholm.
- Latvia has an embassy in New Delhi.

== See also ==
- Foreign relations of Latvia
- Foreign relations of India
- Romani people in Latvia
