= Asia-Pacific Trade Agreements Database =

The Asia-Pacific Trade and Investment Agreements Database (APTIAD) is a resource for researchers and policymakers in the area of international trade and investment. The online database allows searches in two ways. One relates to the agreements themselves where users can search by agreements, members, key terms, types and scopes of agreements and their status. Another possibility is to search publications relevant to regional integration and trade agreements. For easier use of the database, users can download a glossary of related terms from the website.

== Trade Agreements Database ==
The Trade Agreements Database component of APTIAD is designed to give researchers and policymakers both an overview of, and easy access to, all the regional and bilateral trade agreements entered into or under negotiation by the countries of the Asia and Pacific region. As of June 2008 there were 136 such agreements, including those agreements that have not been notified to the WTO but for which there is official information readily available, and also those agreements under negotiation for which there has been at least a first formal negotiation round.

== Interactive Trade Indicators ==
The Interactive Trade Indicators component of APTIAD is designed to help policymakers calculate some of the most commonly used indicators related to trade performance of national economies and/or trade agreements.

The Interactive Trade Indicator Database enables you to select indicators (e.g. export/import value, export/import growth, export/import share, trade share, trade intensity) by country or region, product and year. Export flows are downloaded from UN COMTRADE using World Integrated Trade Solution (WITS) for the last 10 years (at present 1998–2007) for selected developed and developing countries in the Asia-Pacific region.

== Support ==
The Asia-Pacific Trade Agreements Database (APTIAD) is a product of the Trade and Investment Division of the United Nations Economic and Social Commission for Asia and the Pacific.

== Related links ==
- Asia-Pacific Research and Training Network on Trade
- United Nations Economic and Social Commission for Asia and the Pacific
- World Trade Organization
- Asia-Pacific Economic Cooperation
