= Estonia–India relations =

Bilateral relations of Estonia and India

- Estonia: India

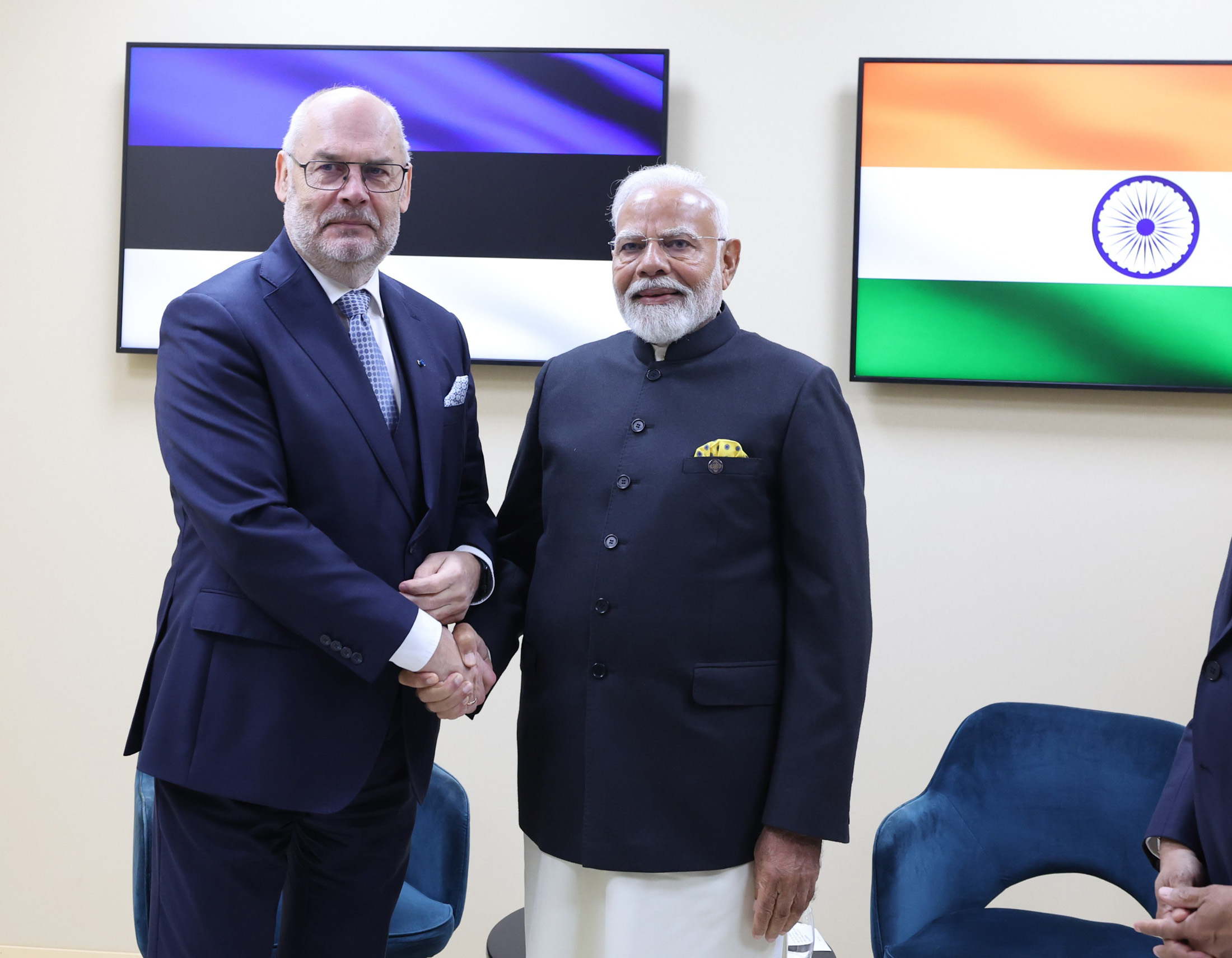
PM of India Narendra Modi meeting the President of the Republic of Estonia Alar Karis

Estonia–India relations are the bilateral relations between Estonia and India. India first recognised Estonia on 22 September 1921 when the former had just acquired membership in the League of Nations. India re-recognised Estonia on 9 September 1991 and diplomatic relations were established on 2 December of the same year in Helsinki. The Embassy of India in Tallinn was opened on 28 December, 2021 headed by a Cd’A a.i. Since 1991, Embassy of India, Helsinki (Finland) was concurrently accredited to Estonia. The first Resident Ambassador Shri Ajaneesh Kumar, presented his credentials on 26 April, 2022. Government of Estonia opened its Embassy in New Delhi headed by a C.d’A in February 2012, with the first resident Ambassador presenting his credentials on 22 February, 2013.

== Official visits ==
To India:

- October 1993 – Trivimi Velliste, the Foreign Minister
- February 1999 – State visit of Lennart Meri, the President
- November 2008 – Urmas Paet, the Foreign Minister
- September 2012 – the Estonian Minister of Education with Senior Delegation from all three major universities of Estonia visit organised by Unica Solutions Ltd. Estonia Education open day was held at Hilton Mumbai.

To Estonia:

- August 1995 – Salman Khurshid, the Minister of State for External Affairs
- 2001 – Minister of External Affairs, Ranjit Singh Kalha, and Estonia's Foreign Minister Toomas Hendrik Ilves meet to discuss cooperation in combating terrorism.
- November 2003 – Digvijay Singh, the Minister of State for External Affairs

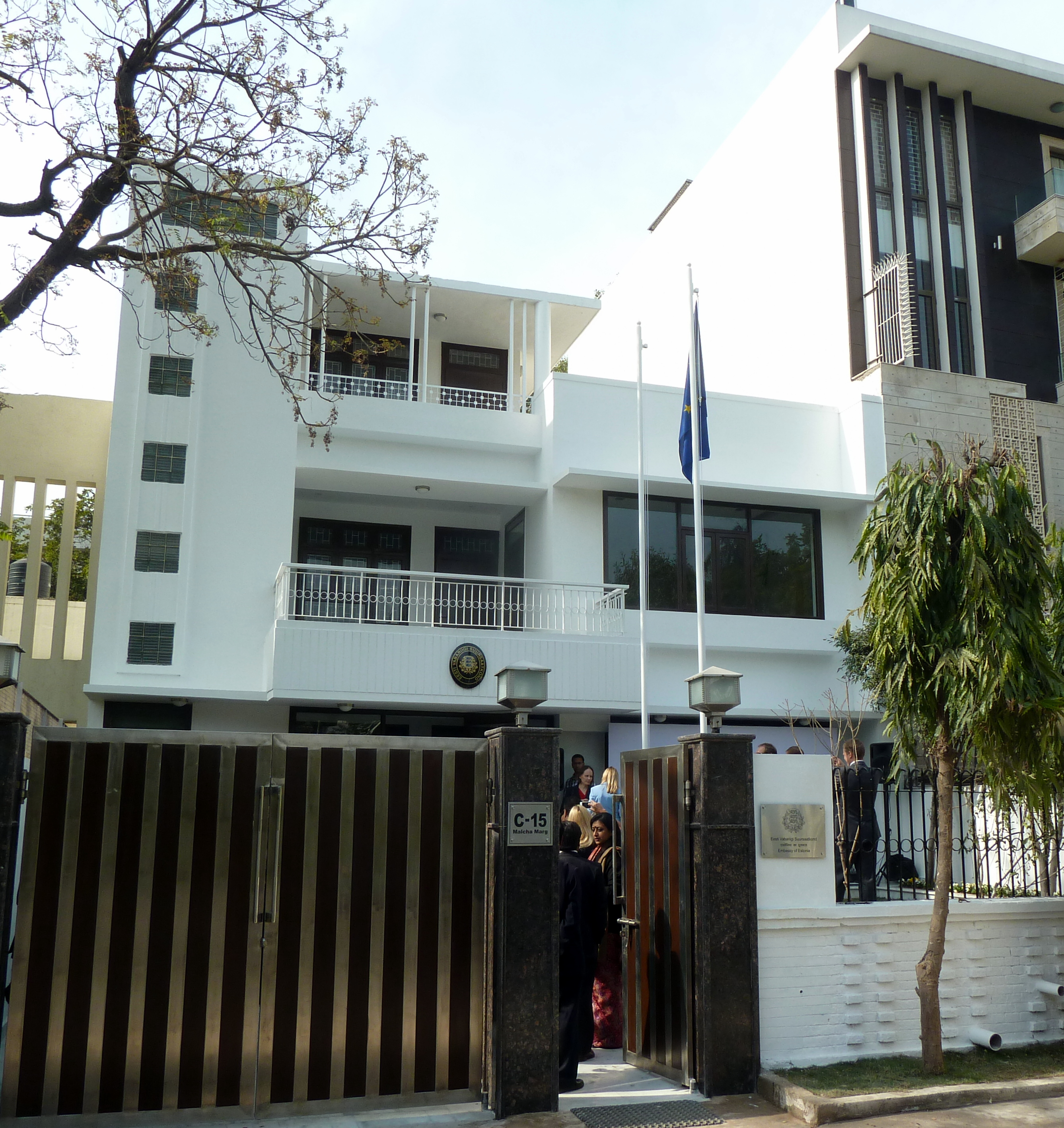
Embassy of Estonia in New Delhi

== Trade ==
In 2007, India was Estonia's 34th largest import partner and 37th largest export partner. Imports into Estonia doubled in 2006. The total value of trade between the countries in 2007 was €30.8 million.

While Indian investment in Estonia is small-scale and is in the commercial and food sector, Estonia has no direct investment in India. However, Estonian Foreign Minister Urmas Paet has expressed desire to improve economic ties and appoint a non-resident ambassador and open its own embassy besides two existing honorary embassies.

India has signed the Joint Business Council Agreement with the Estonian Chamber of Commerce.

Trade between Estonia and India (In US$ million)
Financial Year	2017-2018	2018-2019	2019-2020
Exports to Estonia from India	80.33	64.32	65.44
Imports from Estonia to India	60.54	108.21	54.06
Total bilateral trade	140.87	172.53	119.5

== Cultural ==
The first person from Estonia to visit India at the end of the 17th century was the cleric Eberhard Eckhold (Eckholz) who was born in Tallinn and had studied in the Academia Gustaviana of Tartu. Nothing particular is known about his visit. Adam Johann von Krusenstern's expedition visited India on his way to China in 1797–1798 during the first Russian circumnavigation. He stayed for short whiles in Madras and Calcutta, acquainted with the commercial and administrative activity of the East India Company and made a two-month journey on board HMS Orpheus in the Bay of Bengal. The fact that Krusenstern's library contained around forty items on the history and geography of India and on the Sanskrit literature shows his great interest towards the country.

The first Estonian textbooks to mention India were written by Georg Gottfried Marpurg (1805) and Karl Ernst Berg (1811). The first Estonian publication to arrive in India was Pühhapäiwa Wahhe-luggemissed (Sunday Intermediary Readings) of Otto Wilhelm Masing (1818). The book contained a hundred-page description of the nature and society of India. Sanskrit language publications were printed at the University of Tartu and from 1837, Sanskrit teaching classes commenced, taught by professor Karl Friedrich Keil. One of his successors Leopold Alexander von Schroeder became an outstanding indologist, known for his translations and original studies on the early Indian literature.

Several papers on the missionary work in India, especially among the Tamils were published in the middle of the 19th century. "Maailma maade õpetus" (Lesson on Countries of the World) by Berend Gildenmann gave a short systematic overview of the geography of India, improved by the editions of 1854 and 1868. Johann Voldemar Jannsen's articles on India which were widely popular contributed further to the Estonians' knowledge on the country as he published up-to-date information on the course of the Indian Rebellion of 1857. Further impact in the knowledge was made by the intellectuals Friedrich Reinhold Kreutzwald, Voldemar Hansen, Eduard Friedrich Lossius and others. The first atlas in Estonian "Maakaardi raamat", published in 1857, contained a map of India under the title of Indo-Brittia Riik (Indo-Britain State), populated by toponyms from Masing's and Jannsen's publications.

Several protestant missionaries from Estonia contributed in India. The first one was Arnold Nerling who worked among the Tamils in 1862–1872. Born in Reval, Franz Mathissen studied in the school of the Basel Mission, was sent to work in Calcutta in 1867 and stayed there for the rest of his life. His schoolmate Johannes Hesse from Weissenstein was sent to work in the mountains by Nilagiri in 1869–1874. Albert Grubert from Ahrensburg who had studied in Leipzig, worked in 1871–1876 in Nagapatnam. While they were Baltic Germans, the only missionary of Estonian ethnicity was Christoph Bransfeld from Kärdla who worked with the Gossner Theological College in 1880–1896.

By the late 19th century, India was widely known to Estonians. In addition to the textbooks and the press, brochures were issued on the mission, the Rebellion of 1857, Nana Sahib (1884), the Great Famine of 1876–78 (1892), the hinduism (1892), the British Raj (1895) and more. These were supported by the letters of the missionaries in India published by the Estonian press.

Playing Indian music has become a tradition in the Estonian film festival Orient. Veena player Dr.Mustafa Raza has performed in the festival three times.

The Estonian-Indian Cultural Society was established in 2004 and since then has made regular donations to the Estonian Institute of Humanities, the National Library of Estonia and the University of Tartu.

== Political ==
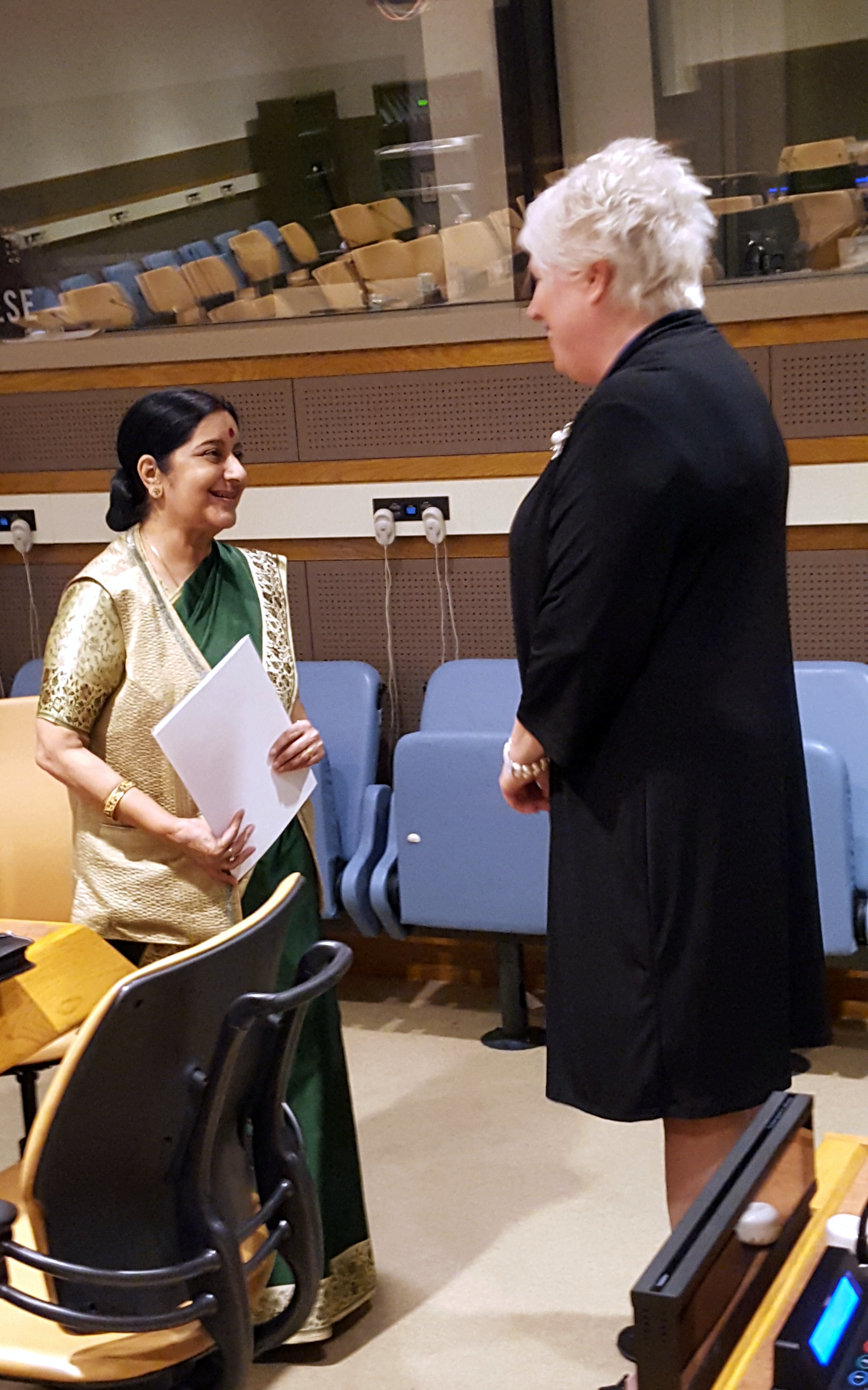
Foreign Ministers Sushma Swaraj and Marina Kaljurand meeting at the 70th UN General Assembly; September 2015.

The Estonian–Indian Parliament Group was established in the Riigikogu in 2004. Estonia has supported India's bid for a permanent seat in the United Nations Security Council. Estonia also supports the Indian draft on Comprehensive Convention on International Terrorism (CCIT) in the United Nations.

== Science ==
In a collaboration with Center for Cellular and Molecular Biology, CCMB, Hyderabad, India, Estonian Biocentre and University of Tartu has published dozens of papers on origin and migrations of South Asian populations. Apart from these many Indian students and researchers are working currently in University of Tartu and Tallinn University of Technology. Gyaneshwer Chaubey was the first Indian student in University of Tartu defended his PhD theses in 2010. Later in 2015, Chandana Basu became the first female Indian student to complete her PhD.

== Agreements ==
Estonia and India have several agreements on co-operations on subjects varying from Science and Technology to Culture, Education, Science, Sports, Arts, Mass Media, Tourism and Youth Affairs. In 1999 India and Estonia signed a joint business council agreement to increase investment and trade between the two countries.

- Declaration of Principles and Directions of Co-operation between the Republic of Estonia and the Republic of India which came into force 15 October 1993
- Agreement on Co-operation in the Fields of Science and Technology which came into force on 6 August 1999
- Agreement on Co-operation in the Spheres of Culture, Education, Science, Sports, Arts, Mass Media, Tourism and Youth Affairs which came into force 11 November 1999
- Agreement on Economic and Technical Co-operation which came into force 13 March 2000
- Agreement on Trade and Economic Co-operation which came into force 24 August 2004

== See also ==
- Foreign relations of Estonia
- Foreign relations of India
