= India–Lithuania relations =

- India: Lithuania

Diplomatic relations between India and Lithuania were established on 25 February 1992.

== Early history ==
India's first contact with Lithuania was through Lithuanian Christian missionaries who traveled to India in the 16th century. Lithuanian interest in India grew in the 19th century after the similarity between Sanskrit and Lithuanian was discovered. Among the languages of Europe, Lithuanian is grammatically closest to Sanskrit. Lithuanians regard their language to be the oldest living Indo-European language.

Vydūnas, known as the Mahatma Gandhi and Sri Aurobindo of Lithuania, was interested in Indian philosophy, and created his own philosophical system closely based on the Vedanta. Vydunas stated that Lithuanian spiritual culture, prior to the introduction of Christianity, shared similarities with Hinduism, including the concept of trimūrti.

== Cultural relations ==
There is growing interest in Lithuania for Indian dance and music, Bollywood, yoga, ayurveda, and the works of Rabindranath Tagore. The International Society for Krishna Consciousness (ISKCON) is present in Lithuania.

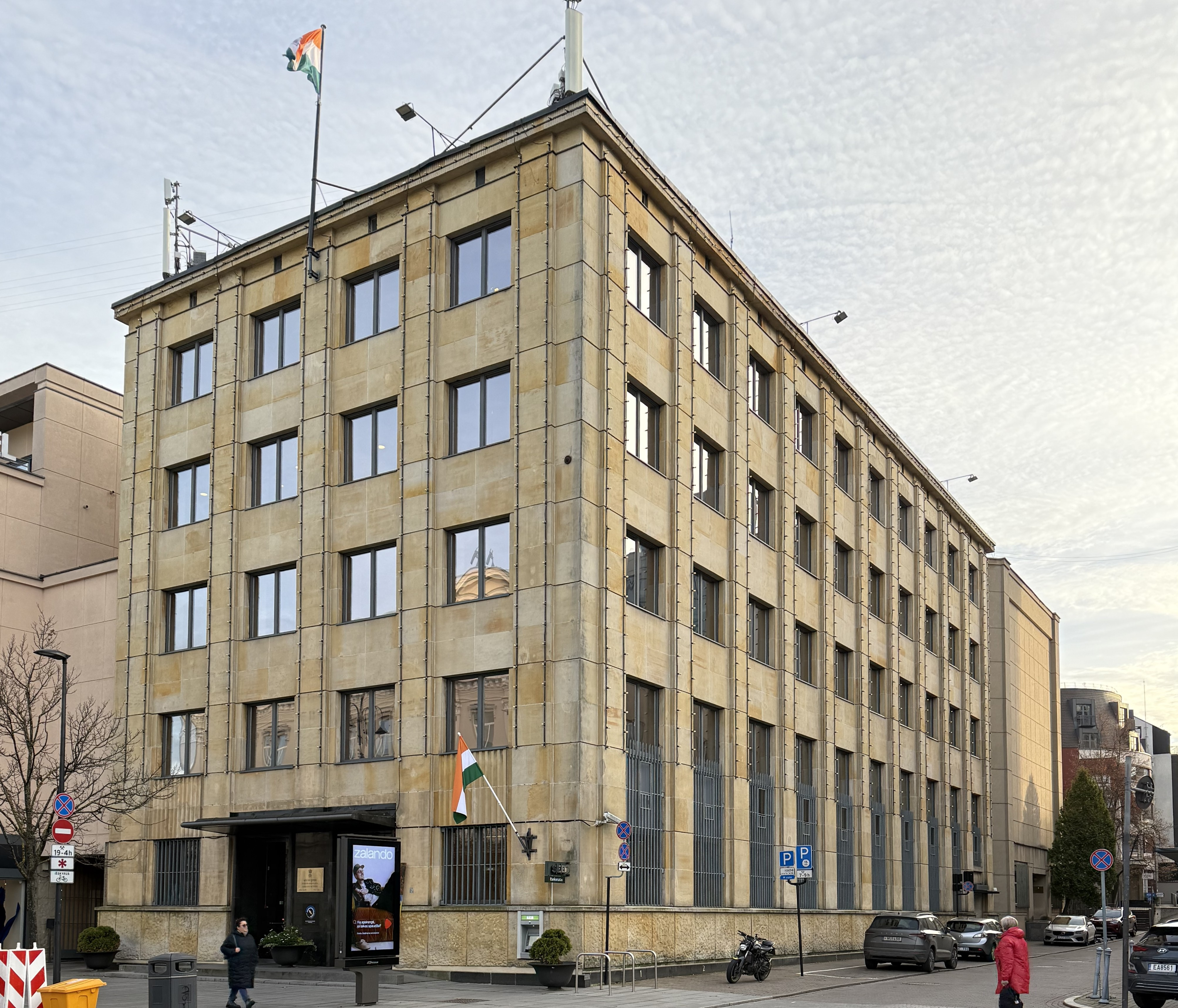
Indian embassy in Vilnius

== Resident diplomatic missions ==
- India has an embassy in Vilnius.
- Lithuania has an embassy in New Delhi.

== See also ==
- Foreign relations of India
- Foreign relations of Lithuania
