= India–EFTA Trade and Economic Partnership Agreement =

2024 trade pact between India and the European Free Trade Association

Free Trade Agreement between the Republic of India and the European Free Trade Association
- Type: Free trade agreement
- Signed: 10 March 2024
- Effective: 1 October 2025
- Parties: India; EFTA
- Languages: English

The India–EFTA Trade and Economic Partnership Agreement (TEPA) is a comprehensive free trade agreement between the European Free Trade Association (EFTA) states (Iceland, Liechtenstein, Norway, and Switzerland) and the Republic of India. It was signed on 10 March 2024, after 16 years of intermittent negotiations, and entered into force on 1 October 2025.

The agreement aims to eliminate or reduce tariffs on the majority of goods traded between India and the EFTA countries and to liberalize trade in services and investment. It also incorporates commitments on sustainable development and includes an unprecedented investment pledge of $100 billion from the EFTA side to India over 15 years.

== Negotiations ==
Discussions on a free trade agreement between India and EFTA began in 2008. Over the next 16 years, the two sides held 21 rounds of negotiations, finally reaching a draft agreement in early 2024. Talks were protracted due to disagreements on issues such as intellectual property rights (EFTA had sought stricter provisions like pharmaceutical data exclusivity, which India resisted) and market access for sensitive sectors. Prime Minister Narendra Modi's government took a cautious approach in the negotiations, aiming to safeguard domestic industries and seeking greater investment commitments from EFTA, which contributed to the lengthy process. Both sides eventually compromised by excluding highly sensitive items – for example, certain agricultural products and gold imports – from tariff concessions in the deal. By early 2024, the Indian government had approved the draft agreement, and the EFTA states also gave their assent, paving the way for the pact to be signed in New Delhi on 10 March 2024.

== Agreement ==
The trade agreement was signed in New Delhi by India's commerce and industry minister and the trade ministers of all four EFTA member states on 10 March 2024. It is a broad-based free trade agreement with 14 chapters covering areas including trade in goods, rules of origin, customs procedures, sanitary and phytosanitary measures (SPS), technical barriers to trade (TBT), trade in services, investment promotion, intellectual property rights, government procurement, competition policy, dispute settlement, and a chapter on trade and sustainable development. Following the signing, each country completed its domestic ratification procedures, and the agreement is set to enter into force on 1 October 2025.

Under the terms of the agreement, EFTA states will eliminate or sharply reduce tariffs on the vast majority of imports from India, covering about 99.6% of India's export value to EFTA. India, in turn, will reduce or remove duties on most imports from the EFTA bloc, accounting for roughly 95% of EFTA's export value to India. Both sides agreed to protect certain sensitive sectors by excluding them from full tariff liberalization. For example, India's offers exclude highly sensitive items such as dairy products, specific agricultural goods, and gold (India's import duties on gold remain in place). In return, EFTA's market access commitments cover all industrial goods and many processed agricultural products, benefiting exporters of goods like machinery, pharmaceuticals, optical and precision instruments, watches, chocolates, and other specialty foods.

The agreement also simplifies customs procedures and includes provisions for mutual recognition of professional qualifications to facilitate services trade. Additionally, as part of the TEPA, the EFTA countries have collectively pledged to increase investments in India by US$100 billion over 15 years – an investment package aimed at boosting India's manufacturing sector and generating an estimated one million jobs

Notably, the TEPA includes a dedicated chapter on trade and sustainable development with legally binding commitments on environmental protection and labor standards – the first time India has agreed to such enforceable provisions in a trade agreement.

== Economic benefits ==
The EFTA–India agreement is expected to significantly expand bilateral trade and investment flows. Indian officials project that the pact will boost India's exports of products such as pharmaceuticals, textiles, chemicals, and machinery to the EFTA region. The deal comes after India's recent trade agreements with partners like the UAE and Australia, and fits into a broader strategy to integrate India more deeply into global supply chains. EFTA countries, in turn, anticipate improved access for their industries to the Indian market of 1.4 billion consumers. Sectors such as machinery and engineering goods, precision instruments (for example, Swiss-made watches and medical devices), pharmaceuticals, and high-end food products (like chocolates and cheese) are expected to benefit from reduced Indian tariffs and fewer trade barriers.

As of 2023, two-way merchandise trade between India and the EFTA countries was estimated at $25 billion, making India one of EFTA's largest trading partners outside the EU. he elimination of most duties under the FTA is expected to lower costs for importers and consumers, potentially increasing trade volumes. However, analysts note that some benefits could be limited. For instance, Switzerland had independently decided to abolish its import tariffs on industrial goods from 2024, meaning Indian exporters would enjoy tariff-free access to the Swiss market even without the FTA – a factor that may reduce the incremental advantage gained through the deal. Likewise, India's agricultural exports to EFTA might continue to face strict sanitary standards and regulatory hurdles, which could constrain growth in those sectors despite tariff concessions.

== See also ==
- India–European Union Free Trade Agreement
