= Customs Union of the Eurasian Economic Union =

Customs union of Former-Soviet states

Eurasian Customs Union
- Policy of: EAEU
- Largest city: Moscow
- Type: Customs union
- Member states: Armenia; Belarus; Kazakhstan; Kyrgyzstan; Russia
- Establishment: 1 January 2010

Area
  - Total: 20,260,431 km^{2} (7,822,596 sq mi)

Population
  - 2013 estimate: 182,519,270
  - Density: 9.01/km^{2} (23.3/sq mi)
- GDP (PPP): 2016 estimate
  - Total: USD 4.5 trillion
  - Per capita: USD 25,000
- GDP (nominal): 2016 estimate
  - Total: USD 1.5 trillion
  - Per capita: USD 8,000

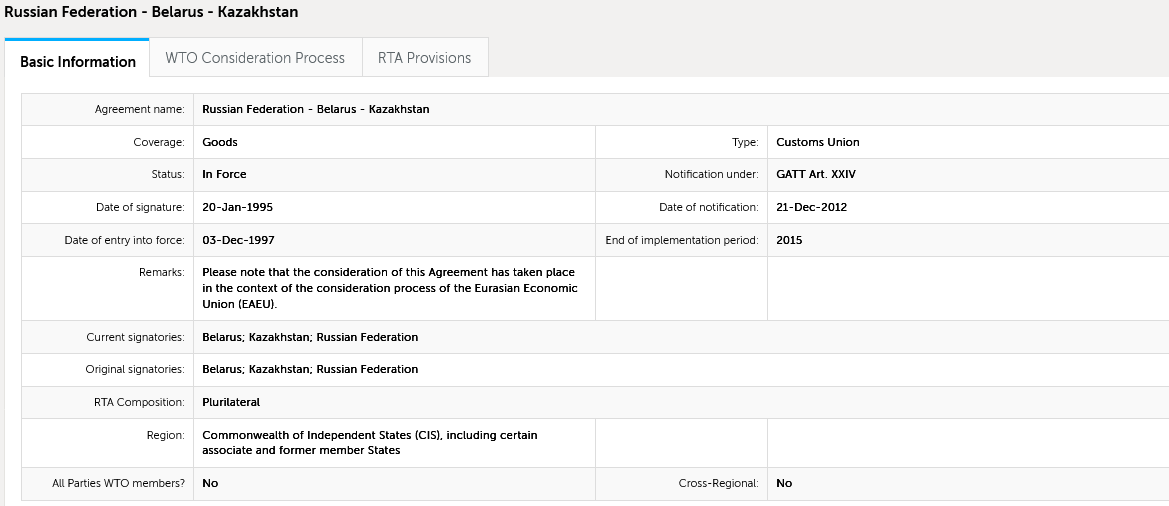
Regional Trade Agreements Database of the World Trade Organization.

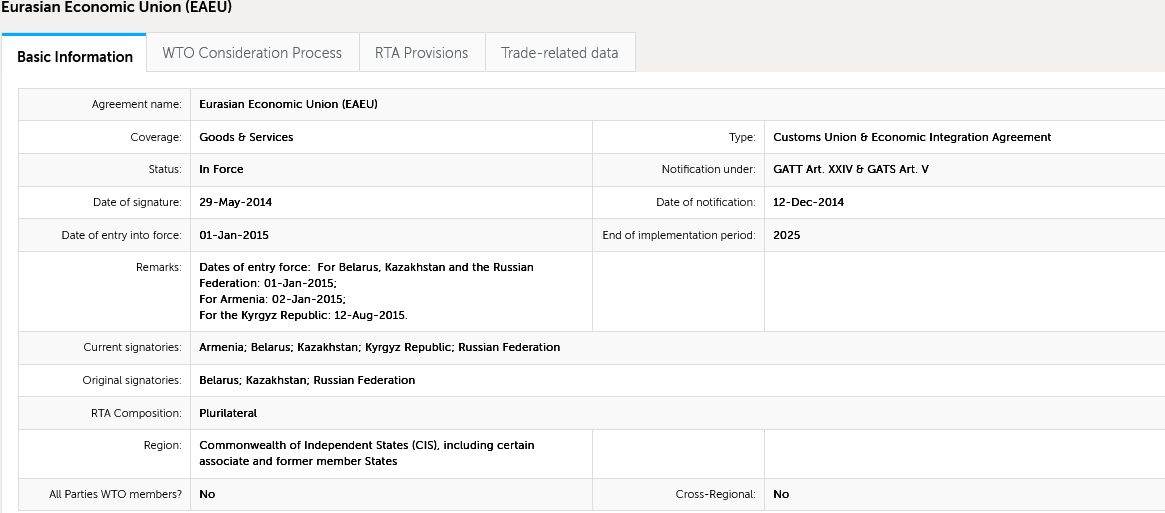
Regional Trade Agreements Database of the World Trade Organization.

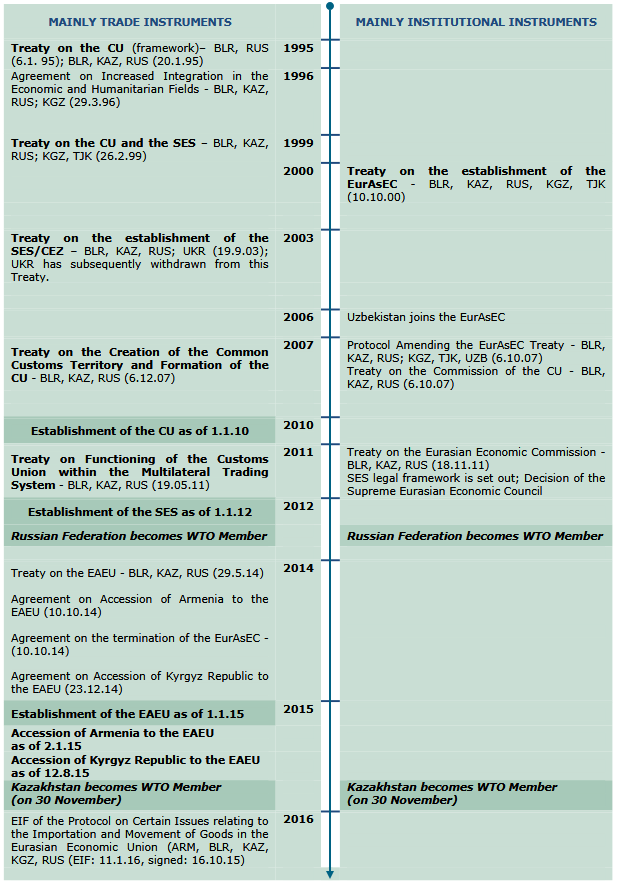
Timeline of EAEU Integration from the World Trade Organization report.

The Customs Union of the Eurasian Economic Union (Russian: Таможенный союз Евразийского экономического союза) or EAEU Customs Union (Russian: Таможенный союз ЕАЭС) is a customs union of 5 post-Soviet states consisting of all the member states of the Eurasian Economic Union (Armenia, Belarus, Kazakhstan, Kyrgyzstan, Russia) which initially became effective on January 1, 2010, at the date of implementation of the common external tariff (CET) as the Customs Union of the Eurasian Economic Community or Customs Union of Russia, Belarus and Kazakhstan. It was inherited from the Eurasian Economic Community (terminated on January 1, 2015) and is now regulated by Part Two of the Treaty on the Eurasian Economic Union (which entered into force on January 1, 2015), EAEU Customs Code, other international agreements and by decisions of supranational bodies as Supreme Eurasian Economic Council, Intergovernmental Council and Eurasian Economic Commission.

No customs are levied on goods travelling within the customs union and – unlike a free-trade area – members of the customs union impose a common external tariff on all goods entering the union (the transition period for Armenia and Kyrgyzstan has ended, but Kazakhstan de jure has some opt-outs due to its obligations during WTO accession). The Union's rules are based on World Trade Organisation rules and WTO principles are binding on all members, but the Union is not a collective WTO member (in contrast the European Union). One of the consequences of the customs union is that the EAEU negotiates as a single entity in international trade agreements, such as free trade agreements in goods, instead of individual member states negotiating for themselves (Article 35 of the EAEU Treaty). The members states can be a separate members of WTO (all except Belarus as of 2024).

The founding documents in 1990s were the Agreement on the Customs Union between Russia and Belarus signed on January 6, 1995, in Minsk and the Agreement on the Customs Union of Russia, Belarus and Kazakhstan signed in Moscow on January 20, 1995. The Eurasian Economic Community, founded in 2000, has assumed responsibility for the implementation of previous agreements, created supranational bodies and finally launched the long-delayed customs union in 2010. According to the database of international treaties of the Eurasian Economic Union, these 1995 agreements are still in force as of 2024 and apply in part not contrary to the Treaty on the Eurasian Economic Union. The launch date in 2010 of the Customs Union was set in 2007 as a result of a decision on common customs territory, CET and the formation of the customs union. Its founding states were Belarus, Kazakhstan, and Russia. On 2 January 2015 it was enlarged to include Armenia. Kyrgyzstan acceded to the EEU on 6 August 2015. Many provisions and separate agreements were codified, consolidated and incorporated into the EAEU Treaty and the EAEU's legal framework (officially "EAEU Treaty and international agreements within the EAEU" according to the database of law of the Eurasian Economic Union), some agreements were terminated and replaced, but some older agreements are still in force in part not contrary to the Treaty on the Eurasian Economic Union (officially "Other international treaties" according to the database of law of the Eurasian Economic Union).

The member states continued with economic integration and removed all customs borders between each other after July 2011. On 19 November 2011, the member states put together a joint commission on fostering closer economic ties, planning to create a Eurasian Economic Union by 2015. On 1 January 2012, the three states formed a single economic space to promote further economic integration. The Eurasian Economic Commission is the regulatory agency for the Customs Union and the Eurasian Economic Community.

The creation of the Eurasian Customs Union was guaranteed by 3 different treaties signed in 1995, 1999 and 2007. The first treaty in 1995 guaranteeing its creation, the second in 1999 guaranteeing its formation, and the third in 2007 announced the establishment of a common customs territory and the formation of the customs union.

== Overview ==
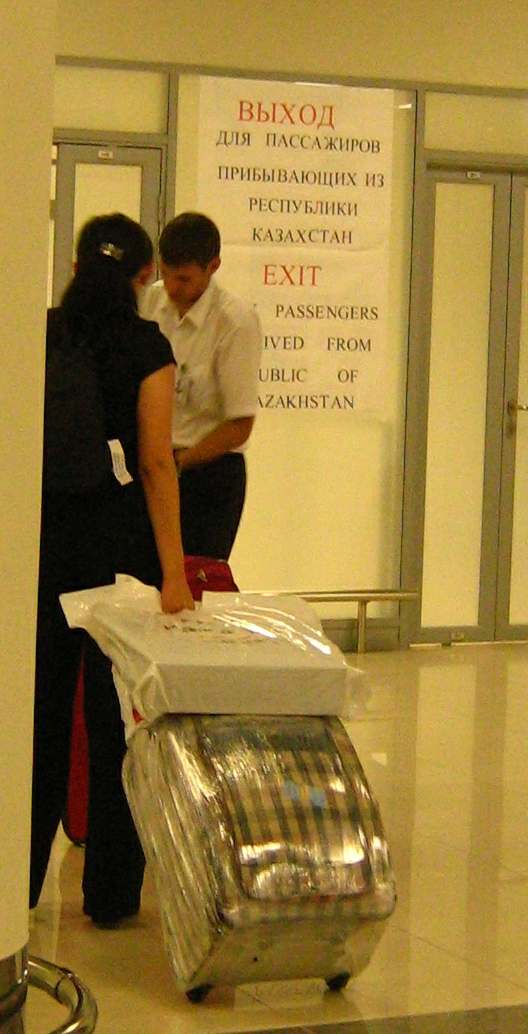
Sheremetyevo International Airport, Moscow, Russia. Passengers from Kazakhstan are no longer subject to customs inspections.

Export

- When exporting goods a zero rated VAT is guaranteed and (or) the exemption (refunds) of excise taxes if sufficient documentary evidence has been provided (proof of export).

Imports

- Imported goods into the territory of Russia from the territory of Belarus or Kazakhstan are subject to VAT and excise duties and are levied by the Russian tax authorities.

As of 2013, 87.95% of customs import duties come from Russia's budget, 4.7% from Belarus and the remainder from Kazakhstan.

== Market access to Eurasian Economic Union (EAEU) – CU EAC approval ==
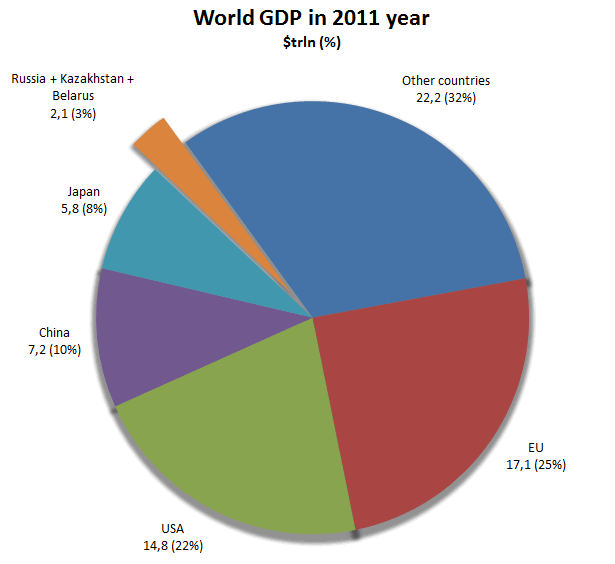
Nominal world GDP and GDP of the Customs Union of Belarus, Kazakhstan and Russia in 2011. European Union: $17.1 trillion (25%) United States: $14.8 trillion (22%) China: $7.2 trillion (10%) Japan: $5.8 trillion (8%) Other countries: $22.2 trillion (32%) Customs Union of Belarus, Kazakhstan and Russia: $2.1 trillion (3%)

Access of products to the single territory of the Eurasian Economic Union – EAEU (Belarus, Russia, Kazakhstan, Armenia, Kyrgyzstan) (formerly Customs Union) is granted after products have proved to be compliant with the requirements of Customs Union (CU) technical regulations (TRs) which are applicable to the product. As of September 2016, 36 CU TRs have been developed covering different types of products. Some TRs are still being developed. Here you can see the list of developed CU TRs.

There are two types of conformity assessment procedures – certification of conformity (CoC) and declaration of conformity (DoC). List of products which are subject to certification and declaration is provided in the relevant CU TRs. The customer can always choose to order a CU Certificate instead of a CU Declaration.

For DoC, the applicant must be a local entity registered in the territory of an EAEU member country. The range of applicants for Certification is defined in the relevant CU TRs (e.g. for CU TR 004/2011 Safety of low voltage equipment and CU TR 020/2011 Electromagnetic Compatibility (EMC), the applicant can be either a manufacturer including a foreign manufacturer of local EAEU entity).

All conformity assessment works (testing/inspection/certification) can only be done by local certification bodies/testing laboratories accredited in the EAEU member countries by their national accrediting authorities. However where the EAEU countries are members of international organizations (such as IECEE), competent national certification bodies in EAEU accredited in the same international organizations (e.g. for the IECEE, the list of EAEU certification bodies accredited in IECEE can be seen at the following link) have the legal right to recognize the results of the national certification bodies from the other member countries of these international organizations.

For products which successfully passed the CU EAC conformity assessment procedure – a CU EAC certificate is issued (an example CU EAC certificate). All certificates/declarations are officially registered (by the certification bodies) in the Registers for CU EAC certificates/declarations maintained by each member country. The term of validity is defined in the certificate (it can be up to 5 years). For series manufacturing certificates, there's mandatory annual surveillance procedure (performed via sample test or factory inspection).

Products complying with all applicable CU TRs are marked with the mandatory EAC mark.

The EAEU member countries managed to agree on unification of requirements for most of categories of products/services (via CU TRs). However:

a) There are areas where national requirements are valid in each member country. E.g. for RF (radiotelecommunication) appliances/modules. It is not currently planned to develop unified requirements in the EAEU for this type of products, although this may change in the future. As of today, it is not expected that unified requirements in EAEU for radio-telecom appliances/modules would appear earlier than in 2020.

b) Due to uneasy process of development of CU TR system in EAEU, the national member countries are starting to implement national requirements in the areas strategically important for these countries in the absence of proper quality unified EAEU TRs (e.g. Belarus introduced mandatory national energy efficiency requirements for electrical products on its territory from 01.02.2017).

Before TRs came into force, the following approvals were the basis for access to the Eurasian Economic Union (Customs Union) member countries:

- National approvals/certificates – they were good for access of product to the country where this approval/certificate has been issued.
- Customs Union certificates/approvals issued in accordance with the "List of products subject to mandatory conformity approval in the Customs Union" – such certificate/approval was valid in all the three member countries of the Customs Union.

The growth rate of the total turnover of foreign and mutual trade of the Customs Union (growth of the quarter compared to the corresponding period of the previous year). The Common Customs Code was established on July 1, 2010 (blue vertical line). Data source: Eurasian Economic Commission, Department of Statistics

The Customs Union has meant that a transit visa is needed when travelling to or from Armenia, Belarus, Kazakhstan or Kyrgyzstan, and changing plane in Russia.

== See also ==
- Commonwealth of Independent States
- Union State
- Eurasian Economic Community
- Collective Security Treaty Organization
- Shanghai Cooperation Organisation
- Eurasian Economic Union
- Eurasian Development Bank
- Enlargement of the Eurasian Economic Union
- Soviet Union
- European Union
- Free trade areas in Europe
- European Union Customs Union
- Post-Soviet states
- Trade bloc
- Schengen Area
