= CAEU =

CAEU may refer to:

- Council of Arab Economic Unity
- Central Asian Economic Union, earlier called Central Asian Union
