= List of international presidential trips made by Serzh Sargsyan =

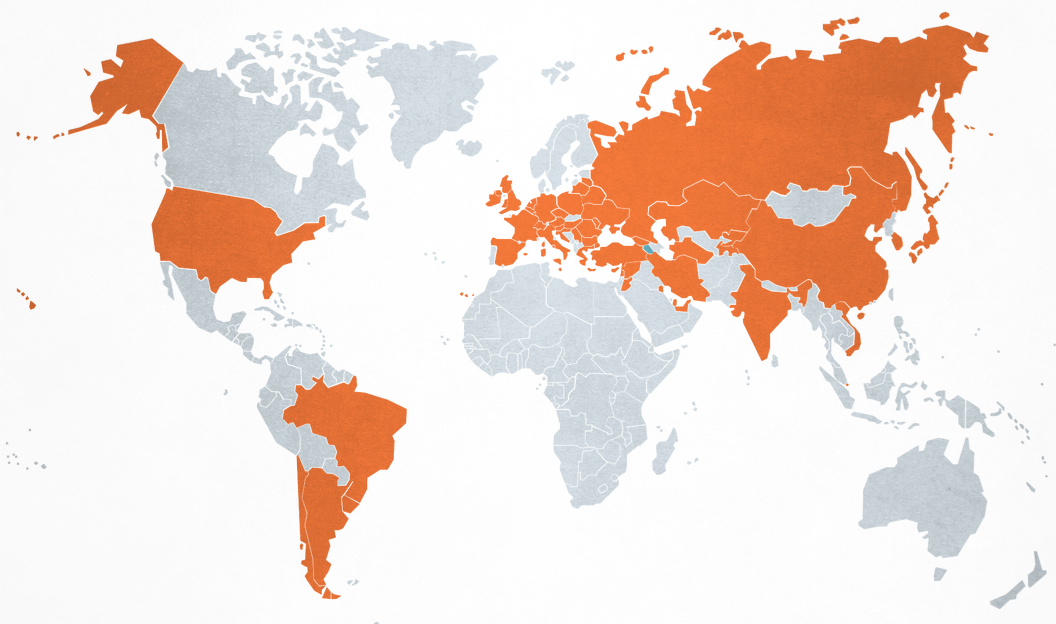
Map of countries visited by Serzh Sargsyan from 2008 to 2018

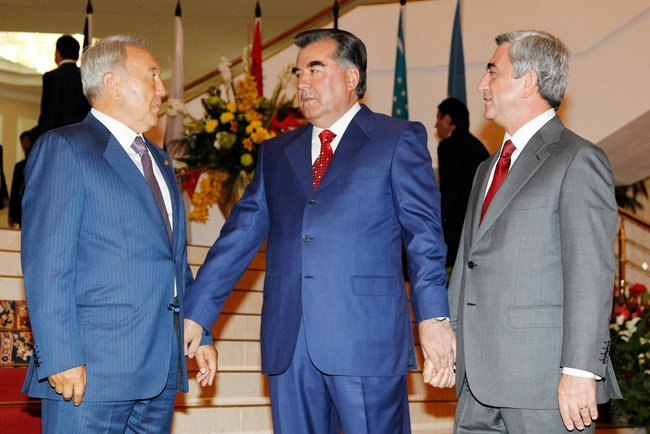
Sargsyan with Emomali Rahmon and Nursultan Nazarbayev in 2011.

This is a list of international trips made by Serzh Sargsyan, the third President of Armenia:

== First Term (2008–2013) ==
=== 2008 ===
Country	Areas visited	Date(s)	Notes	Image
Russia	Saint Petersburg	June 5 – June 7	Participated in the summit of the CIS Heads of State in Saint Petersburg.	
Russia	Moscow	June 23–25	Met with President Dmitry Medvedev.	Dmitry Medvedev with Sargsyan in the Kremlin in June 2008
Kazakhstan	Astana	July 5–6	Participated in the Summit of the Heads of State	
Ukraine	Yalta	July 28–29	Attended the 650th Anniversary of the foundation of the ancient Armenian Holy Cross cloister.	
China	Beijing	August 8–13	Attended the 2008 Summer Olympics.	
Russia	Sochi	September 2	Working Visit.	
Russia	Moscow	September 5	Participated at the regular session of the Heads of State of the Collective Security Treaty Organization in Moscow.	
United States	New York City	September 24	Participated in the 63rd session of the UN General Assembly.	
Georgia	Tbilisi	September 30 – October 1	Met with Mikheil Saakashvili.	
Kyrgyzstan	Bishkek	October 9–10	Attended the Summit of the Council of the CIS Heads of State and the session of the intergovernmental council of the EurAsEC.	
Russia	Moscow	November 2	Met with Azerbaijani President, Ilham Aliyev.	
Belgium	Brussels	November 4–6	Working Visit	
France	Paris	November 6	Working Visit	
Bulgaria Bulgaria	Sofia	December 10–11	Met with Bulgarian President Georgi Parvanov.	
Kazakhstan	Astana	December 19–21	Attended Summit of the Heads of State of the Collective Security Treaty Organization.	

=== 2009 ===
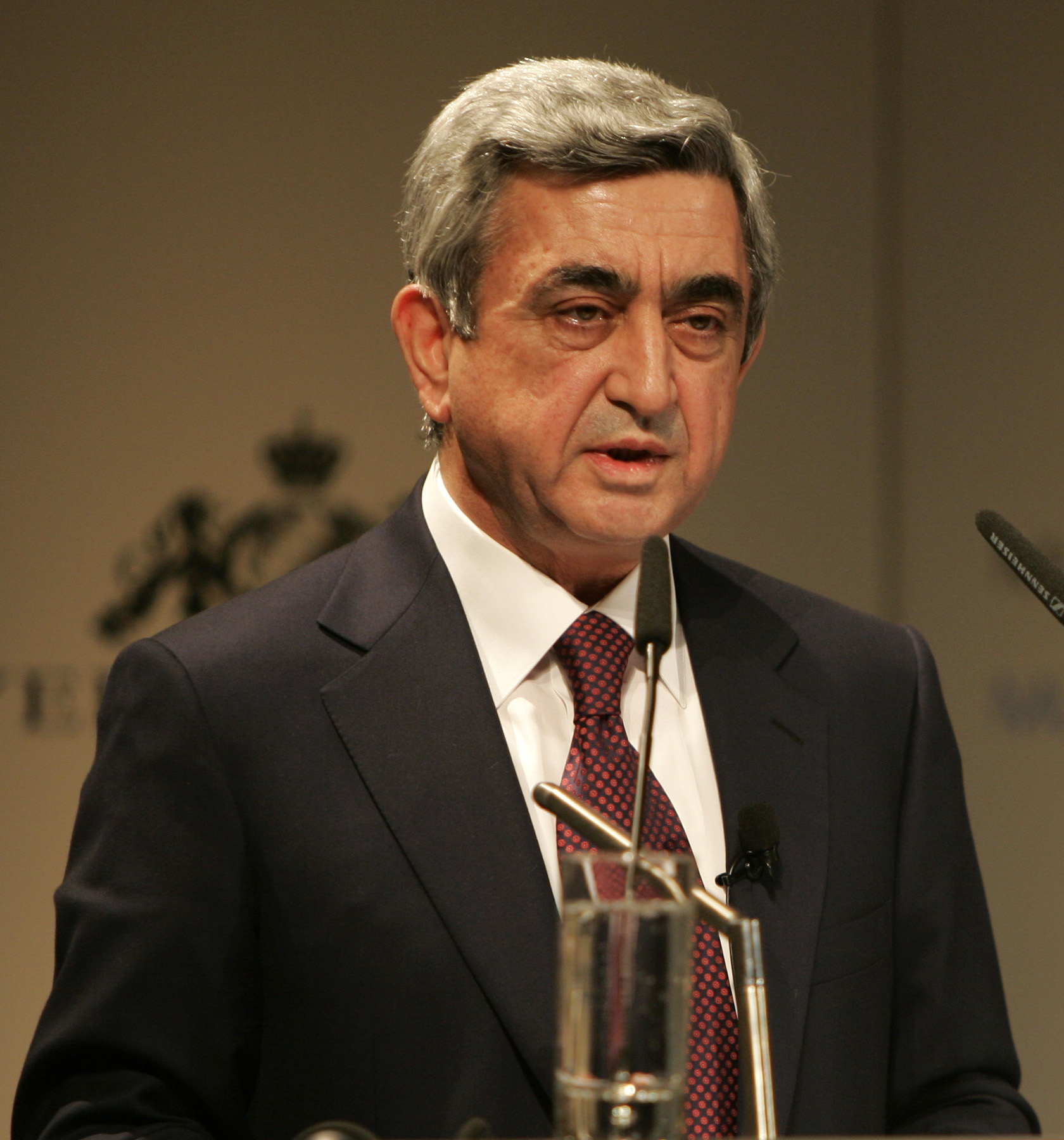
Sargsyan speaking at the 2009 Munich Security Conference.

Country	Areas visited	Date(s)	Notes
Russia	Moscow	January 17–18	Participated in the International gas summit.
Switzerland	Zürich	January 28 – February 1	Working Visit
Russia	Moscow	February 4	Working Visit. Session of the Council of the Collective Security Treaty Organization (CSTO).
Germany	Berlin	February 6–8	Working Visit. Attended the 45th International Conference on Security.
Iran	Tehran	April 13–14	State Visit.
Russia	Moscow	April 23	Working Visit.
Czech Republic	Prague	May 7–8	Working Visit. Attended the first EU Eastern Partnership Summit.
Russia	Saint Petersburg	June 4–6	He held negotiations with the President of Azerbaijan Ilham Aliyev at the Baltic Star Hotel in Saint Petersburg.
Russia	Moscow	June 14	Participated at the regular meeting of the Council of the Collective Security Treaty Organization.
Russia	Moscow	June 17–18	Working Visit.
Kyrgyzstan	Bishkek	July 31	Participated at the unofficial summit of the CSTO.
Russia	Orenburg	August 2–3	Working Visit.
Croatia	Zagreb	September 8–9	Official Visit.
France	Paris	October 1–7	The first stop on his Pan-Armenian tour of Europe. He met with Charles Aznavour.
Moldova	Chișinău	October 8–9	Working Visit. Attended the CIS summit.
Russia	Moscow	October 12	Working Visit.
Turkey	Bursa	October 14–15	Attended a soccer match between Armenia and Turkey. Met with Turkish President Abdullah Gül. They discussed the normalization of the Armenian-Turkish relations without preconditions.
Kazakhstan	Astana	October 15–16	Working Visit. Attended the final stage of the “Cooperation 2009” military exercises conducted by the collective Rapid Response Force of the CSTO at the Maribulak military training field.
Russia	Moscow	October 24–25	Working Visit. Attended the annual Telemarathon of the All-Armenian Hayastan Fund at the Ararat Park Hayat Hotel in Moscow.
Kuwait	Kuwait City	November 3–4	State Visit.
Hungary	Budapest	November 8–10	State Visit.
Russia	Kaliningrad	November 10–11	Working Visit.
Germany	Munich	November 22–24	Working Visit.
Belarus	Minsk	November 26–27	Working visit. Participated in the Interstate Council of the Eurasian Economic Community
Kazakhstan	Almaty	December 18–21	Working Visit. Attended a summit of the Heads of states of the CIS at the Ak Bulak compound Almaty.

=== 2010 ===
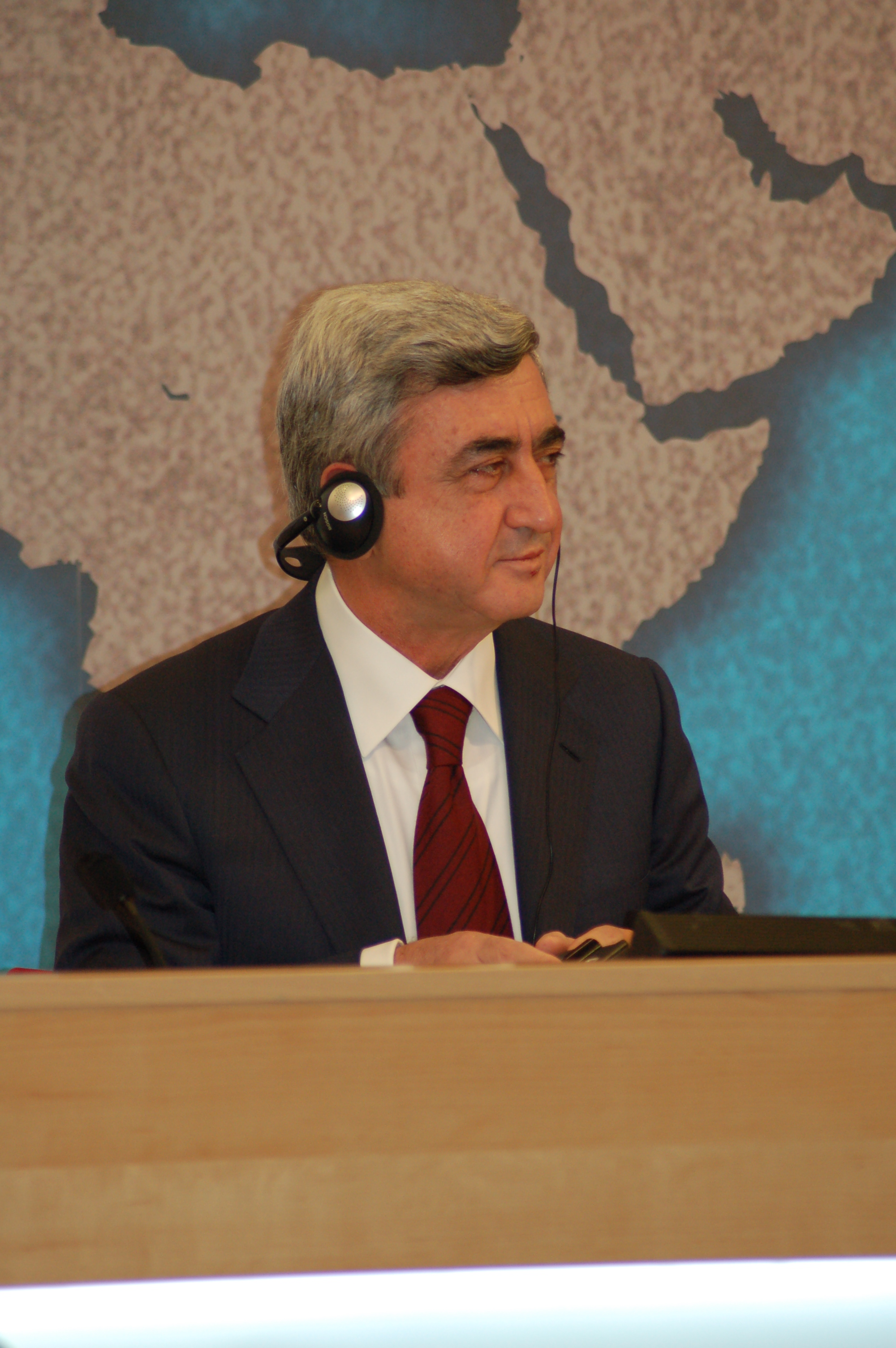
Sargsyan at the Chatham House in London in February 2010

Country	Areas visited	Date(s)	Notes
United Kingdom	London	February 9–11	Working Visit.
Ukraine	Kyiv	February 25	Working Visit. Attended the Inauguration of Viktor Yanukovych
Georgia	Batumi	February 27–28	Private Visit
France	Paris	March 9–11	Official Visit.
Syria	Damascus	March 22–24	State Visit
United States	Washington, D.C.	April 11–13	Working Visit. Participated in the Nuclear Security Summit in Washington, D.C.. He met with the President of the United States Barack Obama. and Met with Turkish Prime Minister Recep Tayyip Erdoğan.
Russia	Moscow	April 20–21	Working Visit. Met with the President of Russian Dmitry Medvedev.
China	Beijing	April 29 – May 3	Attended the opening of the Shanghai Expo-2010. He attended the official opening of the Armenian pavilion as well as toured the pavilions of the US, Russia, and China represented at the expo.
Russia	Moscow	May 8–9	Working Visit. Participated in the celebration for the 65th anniversary of Victory Day. He laid a wreath at the tomb of Marshal Ivan Bagramyan on Red Square.
Belgium	Brussels	May 25–27	Working Visit
Russia	Rostov-on-Don	June 1–2	
Russia	Saint Petersburg	June 17–19	Participated in the summit of the CIS Heads of State in Saint Petersburg.
Germany	Berlin	June 21–23	Met with the representatives of the Armenian-German community.
Kazakhstan	Astana	July 4–6	Attended the Interstate Council of the Eurasian Economic Community.
Ukraine	Yalta	July 10–11	Participated at the unofficial summit of the CIS Heads of State at the Livadia Palace
Russia	Astrakhan	August 10	Working visit.
Russia	Moscow	November 16–18	Working Visit.
Turkmenistan	Ashgabat	November 24–25	Met with Gurbanguly Berdimuhamedow.
Kazakhstan	Astana	November 30 – December 2	Participated in the 7th Summit of the OSCE. Met with the President of Slovenia Danilo Türk.
Russia	Moscow	December 9–10	Working Visit

=== 2011 ===
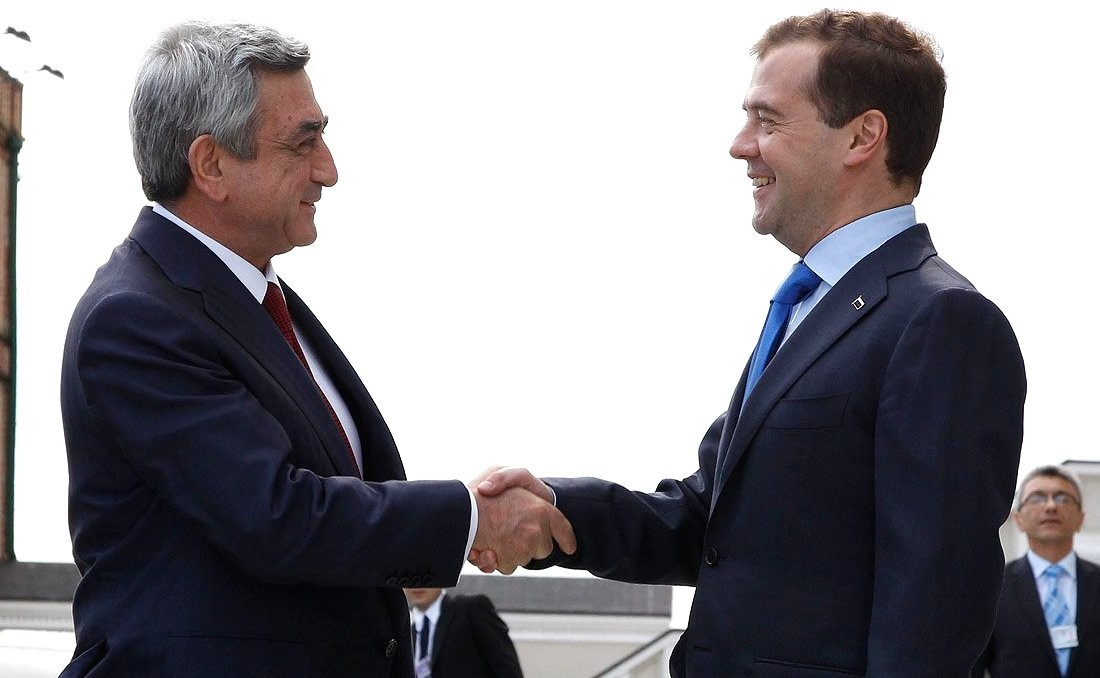
Sargsyan with Dmitry Medvedev in Tatarstan in 2011

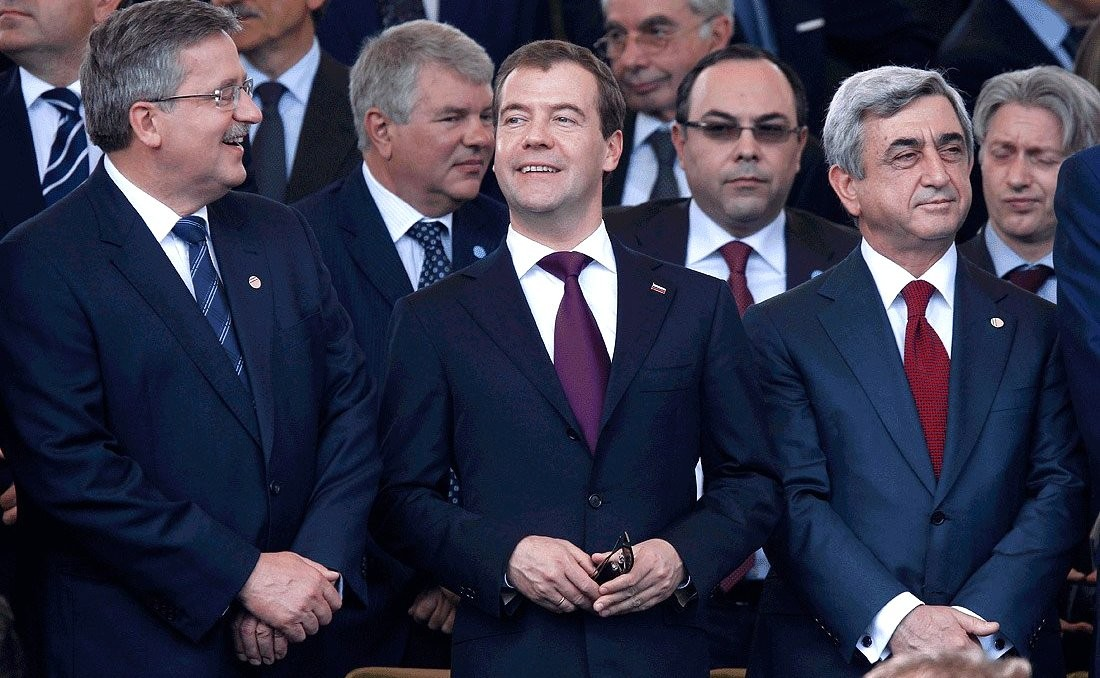
Sargsyan with Dmitry Medvedev and Bronisław Komorowski attending an Italian military parade, 2011

Country	Areas visited	Date(s)	Notes
Cyprus	Nicosia	January 17–18	State Visit.
Greece	Athens	January 18–20	State Visit
Germany	Munich	February 4–5	Working Visit. Participated in the Security Policy Conference.
Russia	Saint Petersburg	February 25	Working Visit
Russia	Sochi	March 5	Working Visit. Attended a trilateral meeting in Sochi with the President of Russia Dmitry Medvedev, and the President of Azerbaijan Ilham Aliyev.
Latvia	Riga	March 9–10	Official Visit.
Iran	Tehran	March 27	Working Visit
Serbia	Belgrade	April 4–5	Official Visit
Slovenia	Ljubljana	April 13–14	Official Visit
Switzerland	Geneva	May 2–3	Working Visit
Italy	Rome	June 1–3	Working Visit. Attended a Military parade and a concert dedicated to the 150th anniversary of Unification of Italy.
France	Strasbourg	June 21–22	Working Visit.
Russia	Kazan	June 24–25	Official Visit. Attended a trilateral meeting of the Presidents of Armenia, Russia and Azerbaijan.
Ukraine	Kyiv	July 1–2	Official Visit
Cyprus	Nicosia	August 11	Official Visit
Kazakhstan	Astana	August 12	Working Visit
Tajikistan	Dushanbe	September 2–3	Participated at the 20th anniversary summit of CIS. Met with the Emomali Rahmon.
United States	Ellis Island	September 22–26	Working Visit
France	Paris	September 27–29	Working Visit
Poland	Warsaw	September 29–30	Working Visit
Russia	Moscow	October 23–25	Working Visit
Georgia	Tbilisi	November 29–30	Official Visit
France	Marseille	December 7	Working Visit
Italy	Rome	December 12	Working Visit
Vatican City	Vatican City	December 12	Official Visit. Met with Pope Benedict XVI.
Russia	Moscow	December 19–20	Working Visit

=== 2012 ===
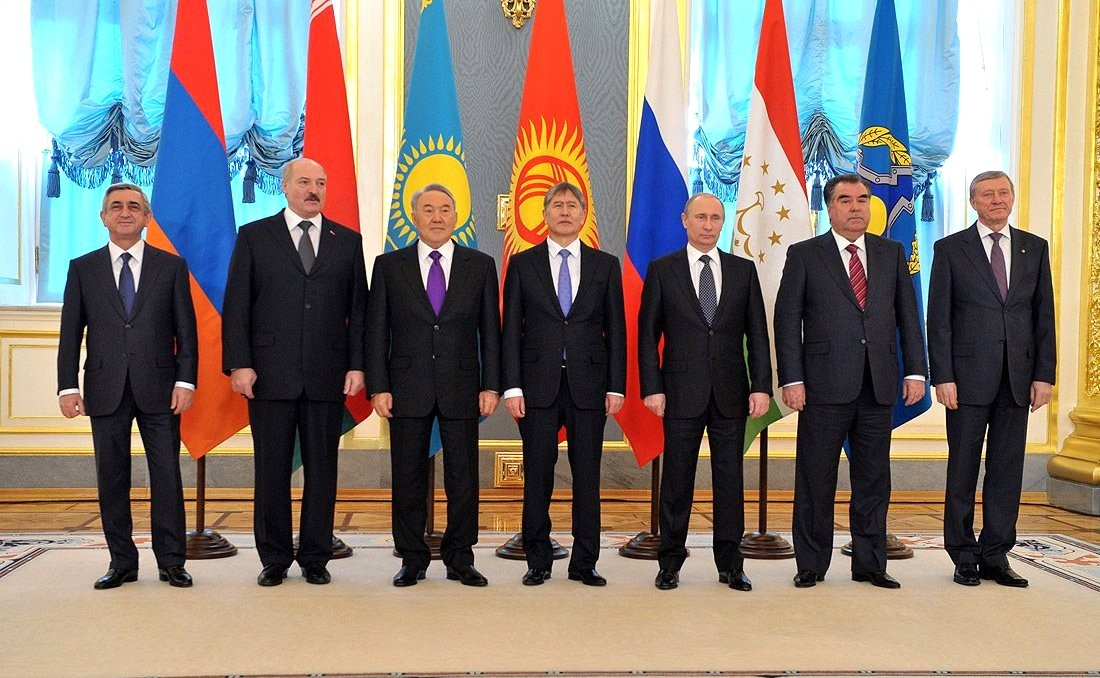
Sargsyan at a 2012 CSTO meeting in Moscow.

Country	Areas visited	Date(s)	Notes
Russia	Sochi	January 23	Working Visit
Belgium	Brussels	March 3–5	Working Visit
Russia	Moscow	March 19–20	Working Visit
South Korea	Seoul	March 25–27	Working Visit
Singapore	Singapore	March 27–29	State Visit
Russia	Moscow	May 15–16	Working Visit
Japan	Tokyo	June 5–7	State Visit
Vietnam	Hanoi	June 8	State Visit
Belgium	Brussels	June 27–28	Working Visit
Ukraine	Kyiv	July 1–2	Working Visit
United Kingdom	London	June 27–31	Working Visit. Sargsyan attended the opening ceremony of the 2012 Summer Olympics.
Russia	Moscow	August 7–8	Working Visit
Romania	Bucharest	October 17–18	Working Visit
France	Paris	November 11–14	Working Visit.
Lebanon	Beirut	November 26–28	State Visit. Met with Michel Suleiman.
Turkmenistan	Ashgabat	December 4–5	Met with Gurbanguly Berdimuhamedow and Vladimir Putin. Attended the Council of the Heads of the CIS member states.
Russia	Moscow	December 18–20	Working Visit

=== 2013 ===
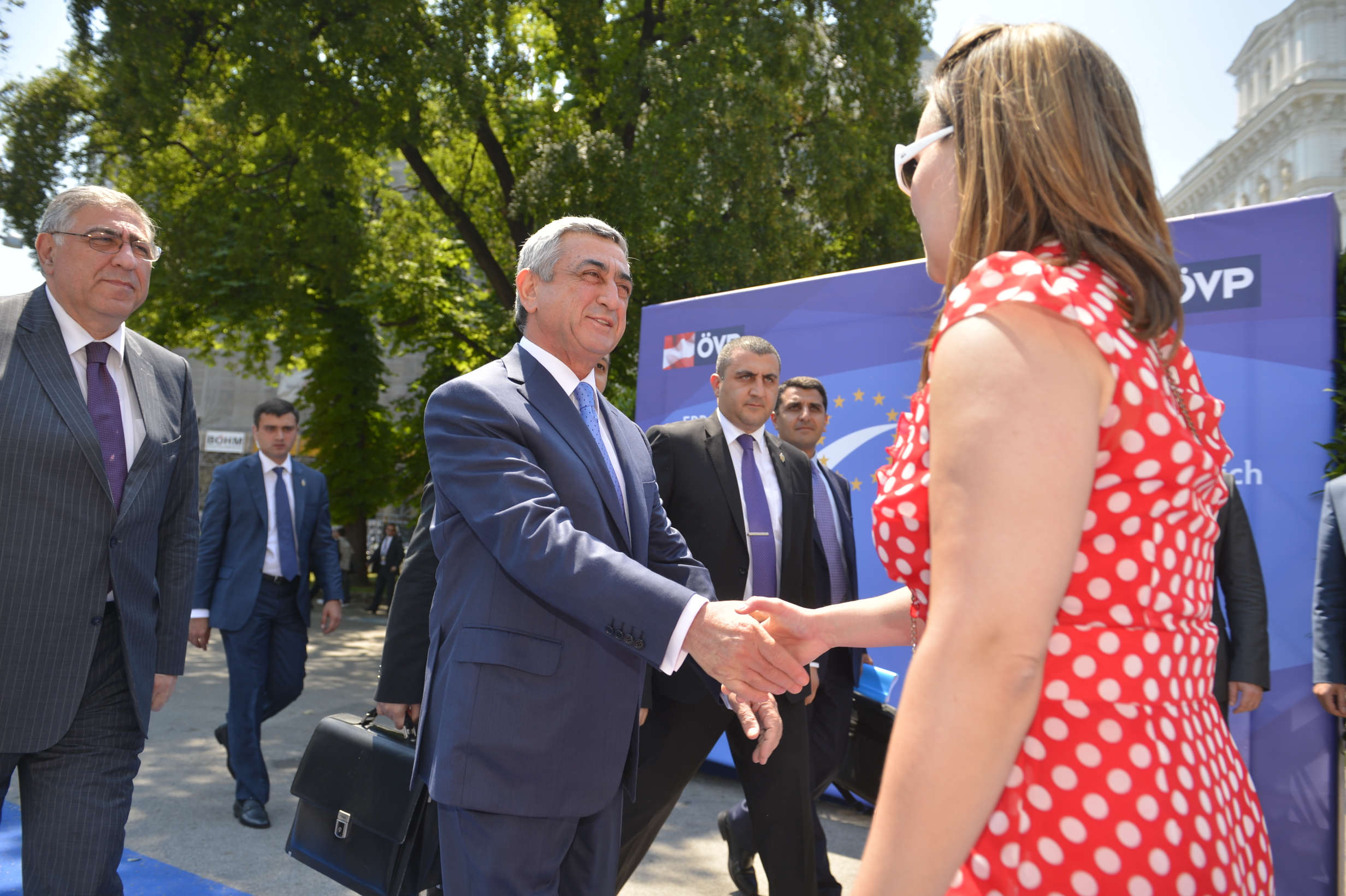
Sargsyan at the 2013 EPP Summit in Vienna.

Country	Areas visited	Date(s)	Notes
Russia	Moscow	March 11–12	Working Visit
Belgium	Brussels	March 14	Working Visit
Vatican City	Vatican City	March 18–19	Official Visit. Attended the inauguration ceremony of Pope Francis.

== Second Term (2013–2018) ==
=== 2013 ===
Country	Areas visited	Date(s)	Notes
Austria	Vienna	June 20	Working Visit.
Poland	Warsaw	June 24–26	State Visit.
Moldova	Chișinău	July 11	State Visit.
Iran	Tehran	August 4–5	Attended the official inauguration ceremony of Hassan Rouhani.
Russia	Moscow	September 3	Working Visit
Russia	Moscow	September 16–18	Working Visit
Russia	Sochi	September 23	Working Visit
France	Paris	September 30 – October 2	Working Visit
Belarus	Minsk	October 24–25	Attended a scheduled session of the Eurasian Economic Community.
Austria	Vienna	November 18–19	Working Visit
Lithuania	Vilnius	November 28–29	Working Visit
Russia	Moscow	December 23–24	Working Visit

=== 2014 ===
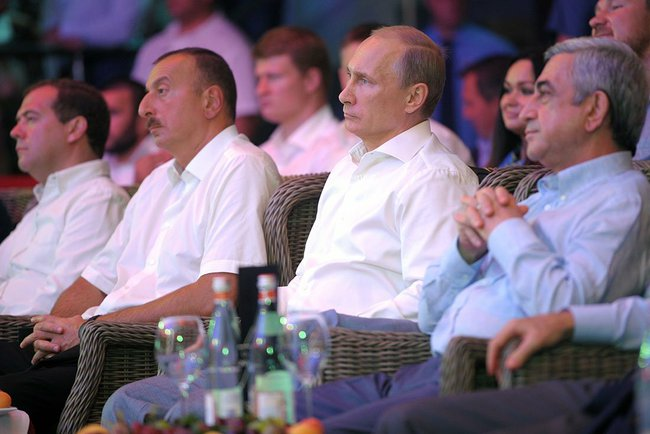
Sargsyan with Vladimir Putin and Ilham Aliyev in Sochi, Russia in August 2014

Country	Areas visited	Date(s)	Note
Czech Republic	Prague	January 29–30	State Visit.
Ireland	Dublin	March 6–7	Working Visit.
Netherlands	Amsterdam	March 23–25	Met with the Co-Chairs of the OSCE Minsk Group.
Turkmenistan	Ashgabat	April 7–9	Met with Gurbanguly Berdimuhamedow.
Czech Republic	Prague	April 24–25	Working Visit.
Russia	Moscow	May 7–8	Working Visit. Watched CSTO exercises in the Kremlin.
Kazakhstan	Astana	May 28–29	Working Visit.
Austria	Vienna	June 10–12	Official Visit.
Georgia	Tbilisi	June 18–19	Official Visit.
Argentina	Buenos Aires	July 7–8	Official Visit.
Uruguay	Montevideo	July 9–10	Official Visit.
Chile	Santiago	July 11–12	Official Visit.
Russia	Sochi	August 8–10	Working Visit
United Kingdom	London	September 3–5	Working Visit
Vatican City	Vatican City	September 18–19	Official Visit.
United States	New York City	September 23–27	Working Visit. Attended the 69th session of the UN General Assembly.
Belarus	Minsk	October 9–10	Attended a scheduled session of the Council of Heads of CIS States.
France	Paris	October 26–28	Working Visit. Met with François Hollande.
Jordan	Amman	October 29–30	Official Visit
Belgium	Brussels	December 18	Working Visit.

=== 2015 ===
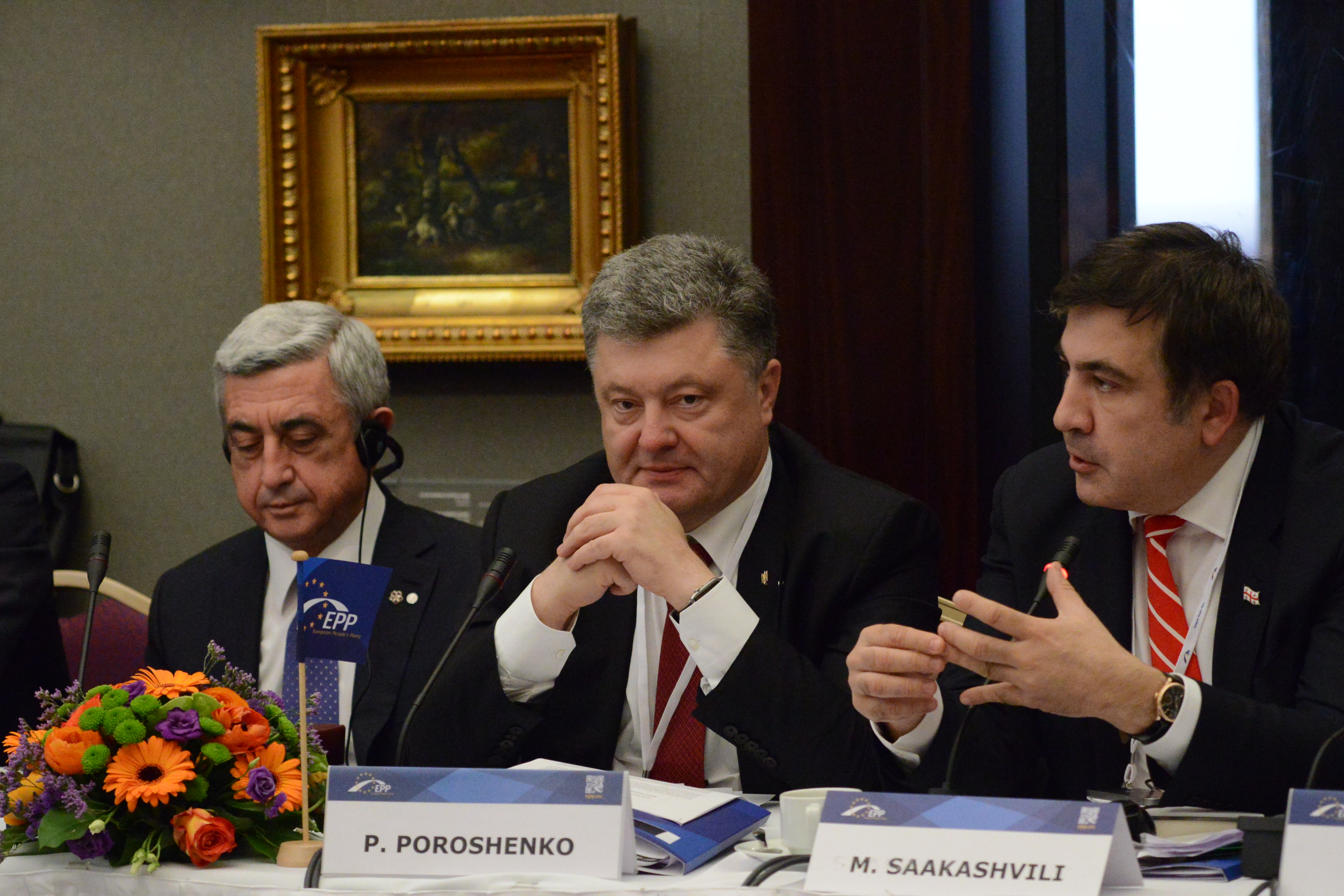
Sargsyan with Petro Poroshenko and Mikheil Saakashvili in May 2015

Country	Areas visited	Date(s)	Notes
China	Beijing	March 25–28	State Visit
Italy	Rome	April 8–11	Official Visit
Vatican City	Vatican City	April 12	Official Visit
United States	Washington, D.C.	May 6–8	Working Visit
Russia	Moscow	May 9	Working Visit. Participated in the celebration for the 70th anniversary of Victory Day.
Latvia	Riga	May 21–22	Working Visit
France	Paris	June 6–7	Working Visit
Belgium	Brussels	June 25	Working Visit
Russia	Ufa	July 9–10	Working Visit
Russia	Moscow	September 7	Working Visit
Tajikistan	Dushanbe	September 14–15	Working Visit
United States	New York City	September 28–30	Working Visit. Attended the 70th session of the UN General Assembly.
Kazakhstan	Astana	October 16	Working Visit
Spain	Madrid	October 21–22	Working Visit
United Kingdom	London	October 27–29	Working Visit
Georgia	Tbilisi	October 30–31	Working Visit
France	Paris	November 30	Working Visit
Switzerland	Bern	December 19	Working Visit
Russia	Moscow	December 21	Working Visit

=== 2016 ===
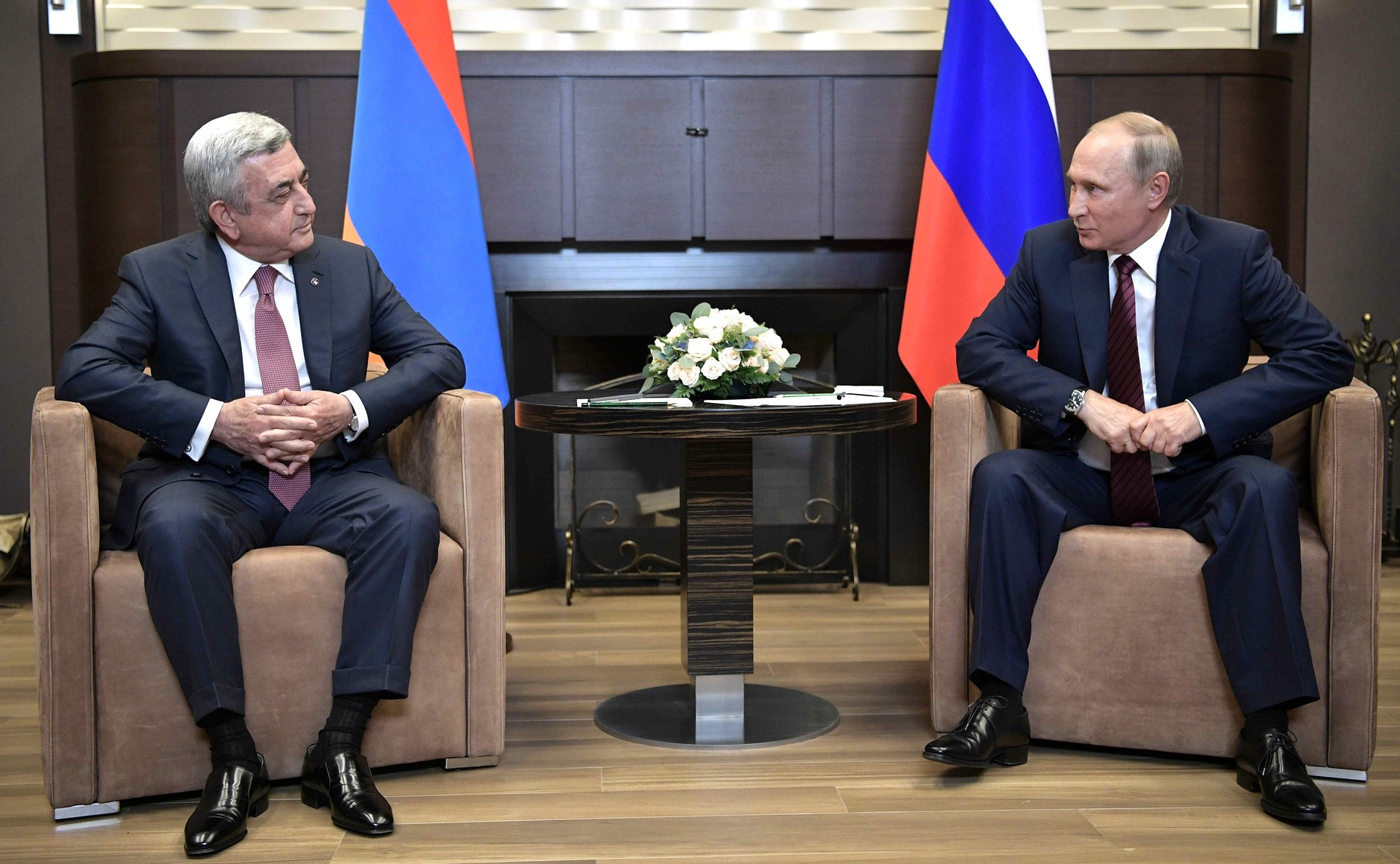
Sargsyan in a meeting with Vladimir Putin in Sochi.

Country	Areas visited	Date(s)	Notes
Russia	Moscow	March 10–11	Working Visit
Greece	Athens	March 14–15	State Visit
Cyprus	Nicosia	March 15–16	State Visit.
Belgium	Brussels	March 16–17	Working Visit.
United States	Watertown	March 28 – April 1	Working Visit
Germany	Berlin	April 5–7	Official Visit
Austria	Vienna	May 16	Working Visit
Luxemburg	Luxembourg	May 30	Working Visit
Kazakhstan	Astana	May 31	Working Visit
Russia	Saint Petersburg	June 20	Working Visit
Poland	Warsaw	July 7–8	Working Visit
Russia	Moscow	August 10	Working Visit
Brazil	Rio de Janeiro	August 11–15	Working Visit
Kyrgyzstan	Bishkek	September 16–17	Working Visit
United States	New York City	October 10	Working Visit
Netherlands	Amsterdam	October 19–20	Working Visit
United Arab Emirates	Abu Dhabi	November 9–10	Official Visit
Russia	Saint Petersburg	December 26	Working Visit

=== 2017 ===
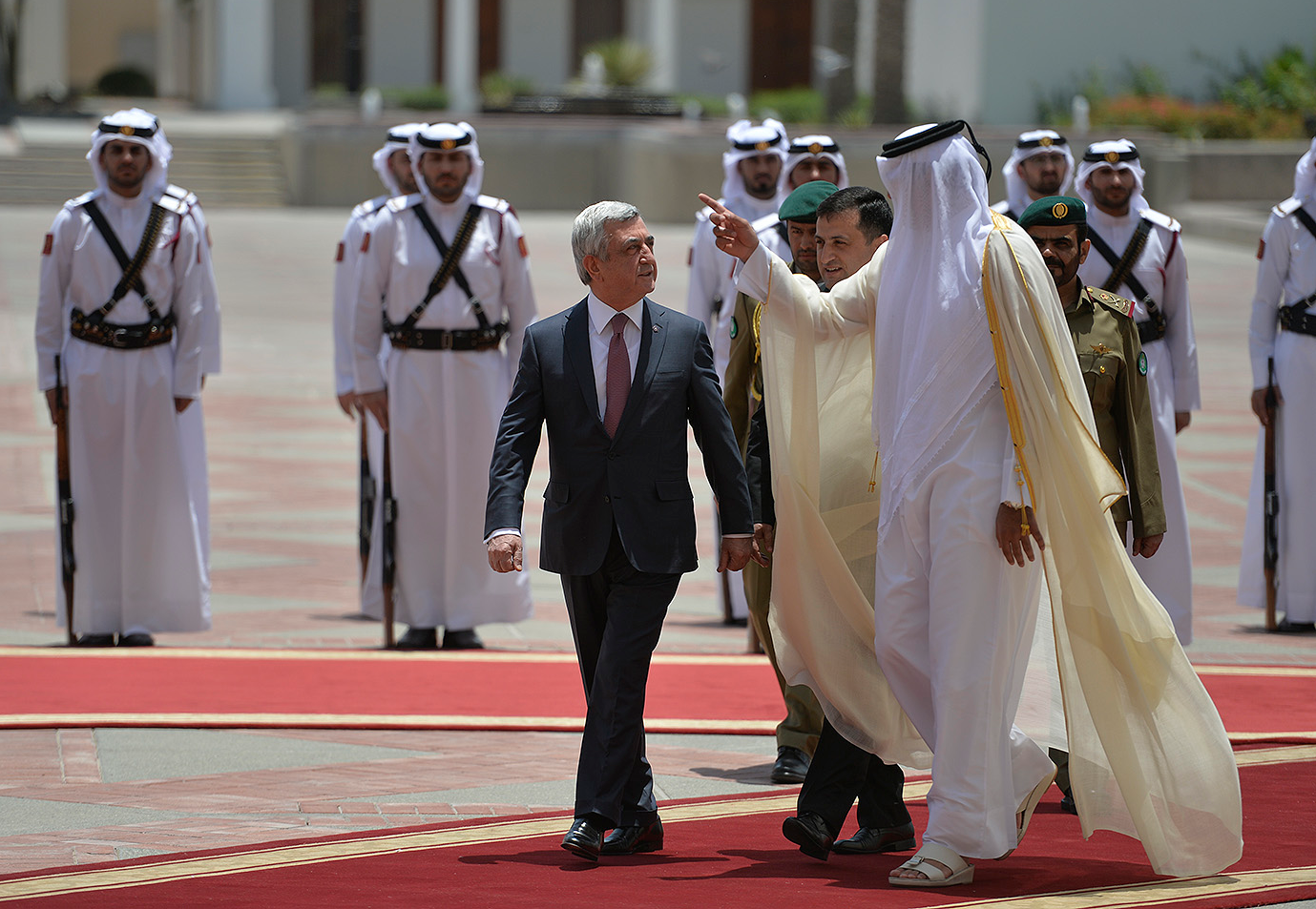
Sargsyan in Doha, Qatar.

Vladimir Putin and Sargsyan opened the Days of Armenian Culture in Russia during a ceremony at the Tretyakov Gallery.

Country	Areas visited	Date(s)	Notes
Belgium	Brussels	February 26–28	Working Visit
France	Paris	March 7–9	Official Visit. Met with François Hollande.
Russia	Moscow	March 14–15	Official Visit
United Arab Emirates	Abu Dhabi	March 21–22	Working Visit
Malta	Valletta	March 29–30	Working Visit
Kyrgyzstan	Bishkek	April 13–14	Attended a session of the Eurasian Economic Supreme Council.
Qatar	Doha	May 15–16	Official Visit.
Kazakhstan	Astana	June 9–10	Attended the opening ceremony of Expo 2017.
Belgium	Brussels	June 21–22	Attended a summit of the European People’s Party.
Iran Iran	Tehran	August 5–6	Attended the official inauguration ceremony of Hassan Rouhani.
Russia	Sochi	August 23	Met with Vladimir Putin.
Turkmenistan	Ashgabat	September 17	Main article: Armenia–Turkmenistan relations Attended the opening ceremony for the 5th Asian Games.
United States	New York City	September 19	Attended the UN General Assembly.
Russia	Sochi	October 10	Attended the meeting of the CIS Council of Heads of State.
Switzerland	Geneva	October 16	Attended negotiations with Ilham Aliyev.
India	New Delhi	November 3–4	Working Visit
Russia	Moscow	November 15	Working Visit
Belgium	Brussels	November 23–24	Working Visit.
Belarus	Minsk	November 30	Attended a scheduled session of the Collective Security Council of the Collective Security Treaty Organization.
Georgia	Tbilisi	December 25–26	Official Visit
Russia	Moscow	December 26–27	Attended the meeting of the CIS Council of Heads of State.

=== 2018 ===
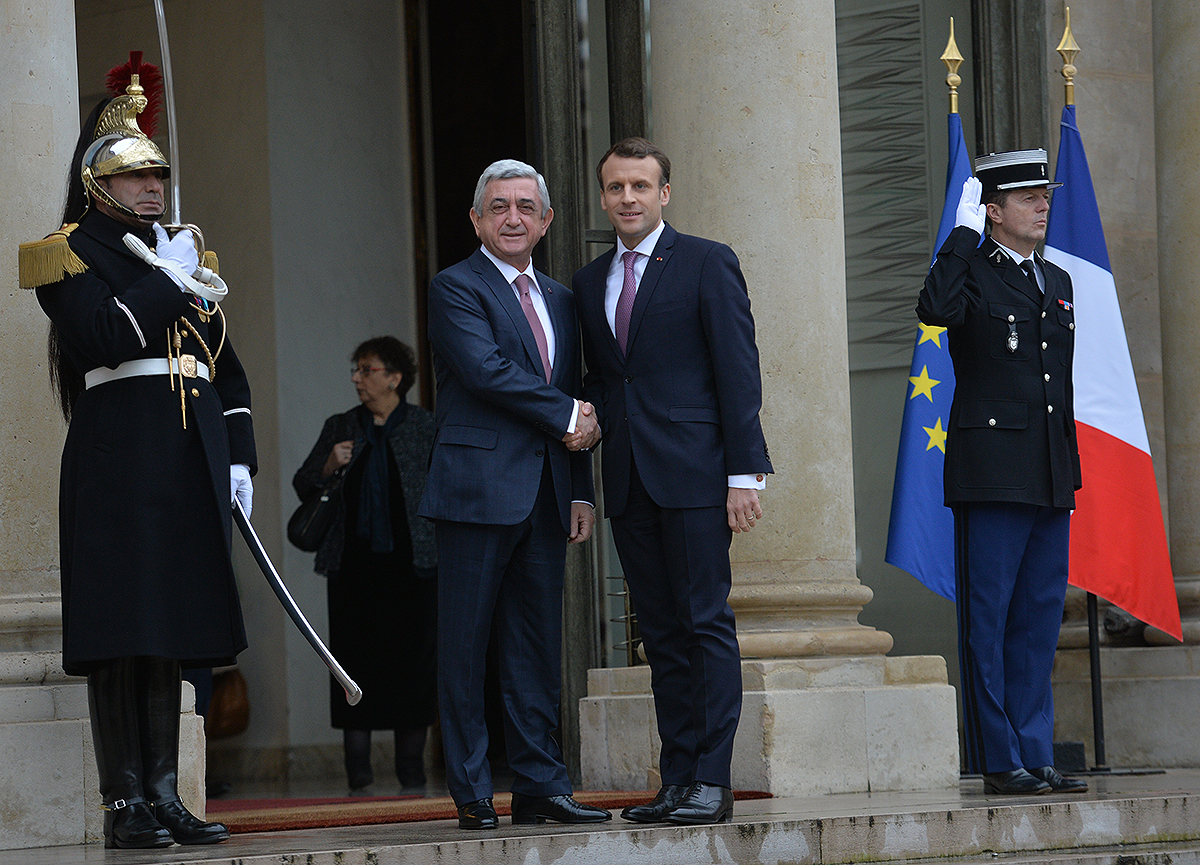
Sargsyan with French President Emmanuel Macron in Paris, 22 January 2018

Country	Areas visited	Date(s)	Notes
France	Paris	January 22–24	Working Visit. Met with President of Senate Gérard Larcher.
Germany	Munich	February 17–18	Attended the Munich Security Conference.
Germany	Berlin	March 9–10	Attended the opening ceremony of the World Chess Candidates Tournament.
Italy	Rome	April 4–6	Official Visit
Vatican City	Vatican City	April 4–6	Official Visit
