= Member states of the Eurasian Economic Union =

- Category: Sovereign states
- Location: Eurasian Economic Union
- Created: 2015
- Number: 5 (as of 2019)
- Possible types: Republics (5)
- Populations: 182,519,270
- Areas: 20,260,431 km^{2} (7,822,596 sq mi)
- Government: Presidential republic (2); Semi-presidential republic (2); Unitary parliamentary republic (1)

The Eurasian Economic Union (EEU) currently comprises 5 member states, which are party to the founding treaties of the EEU and thereby subject to the privileges and obligations of membership. The constituent states of the EEU are placed under binding laws and have equal representation within the EEU's executive and judicial bodies. They do however retain considerable autonomy, and must be unanimous for the EEU to adopt policies or new member states. Consensus is a founding principle of the EEU.

In 2000 six states created the EEU's predecessor, the Eurasian Economic Community. In 2010 three core states (Russia, Belarus and Kazakhstan) pursued integration and founded the Eurasian Customs Union and the Single Economic Space. The three states are the founding members of the Eurasian Economic Union. The remaining states have acceded in subsequent enlargements. On 9 October 2014 Armenia signed the treaty and became the newest member state of the EEU on accession on 2 January 2015. Kyrgyzstan signed an accession treaty on 23 December 2014, which came into force on 6 August 2015.

Iran joined into a free trade agreement with the EEU in October 2018, following months of negotiations with Russia. The deal included 862 commodity items.

In order to accede, a state must fulfill the economic and political requirements. Enlargement of the Union is also subject to the consent of all existing members and the candidate's adoption of the existing body of EEU law and implementing previous decisions made by the Eurasian Commission, which become part of the EEU's regulatory framework.

== List ==
Member States of the Eurasian Economic Union Observer states Candidate states

=== Members ===
- Armenia (2 Jan 2015)
- Belarus (1 Jan 2015)
- Kazakhstan (1 Jan 2015)
- Kyrgyzstan (12 Aug 2015)
- Russia (1 Jan 2015)

=== Observer members ===
- Cuba On 11 December 2020, Cuba became an observer member. Cuba becomes the first country outside Eurasia and the first country from the Americas to be granted observer status.
- Moldova On April 14, 2017, Moldova became the first observer member.
- Uzbekistan On 11 December 2020, Uzbekistan became an observer member.
- Iran On 26 December 2024, Iran became an observer member.

=== Potential candidates for membership ===
- Mongolia
- Ba'athist Syria (until 2024)
- Tajikistan
- Uzbekistan

=== Potential candidates for Observers ===
- Myanmar
- Nicaragua
- Venezuela

=== Free Trade Zone agreements ===
- China
- Indonesia
- Iran
- Mongolia
- Serbia
- Singapore
- United Arab Emirates
- Vietnam

=== Free Trade Zone agreements currently under negotiation ===
- Egypt
- India

=== Trade Agreements which expediency is under study ===
- Tunisia

== Statistics ==
=== Population ===
At the moment, there are 183,438,872 people residing in the EAEU countries.

- ▲ = increase.
- = steady.
- ▼ = decrease.

Country	Population		World position
Country	June 1, 2017	July 14, 2019	World position
Armenia	2,981,500	2,962,100	135
Belarus	9,498,600	9,465,300	93
Kazakhstan	18,014,200	18,512,464	62 (▲3)
Kyrgyzstan	6,140,200	6,389,500	110
Russia	146,804,372	146,793,744	9
Summary	183,438,872	184,123,108	8

=== HDI ===
Country	HDI by year					
Country	2015		2017		2018	
Russia	0,804 (▼0,001)	49	0,816 (▲0,012)	49	0,824 (▲0,008)	49
Belarus	0,796 (▼0,002)	52	0,808 (▲0,012)	53	0,817 (▲0,009)	50
Kazakhstan	0,794 (▲0,001)	56	0,800 (▲0,006)	58	0,817 (▲0,017)	50
Armenia	0,743 (▲0,002)	84	0,755 (▲0,012)	83	0,760 (▲0,005)	81
Kyrgyzstan	0,662 (▲0,002)	120	0,672 (▲0,010)	122	0,674 (▲0,002)	122
Medium	0,760 (▲0,001)		0,770 (▲0,010)		0,778 (▲0,008)	

== Representation ==
Each state has representation in the institutions of the Eurasian Economic Union. Full membership gives the government of a member state one seat in the Supreme Council of the Eurasian Economic Union and the Eurasian Intergovernmental Council. All major decisions are taken by consensus, although decisions taken by the Eurasian Commission require a qualified majority vote. Votes in the commission are weighted so that every country has 3 votes. The Presidency of the Supreme Council of the Eurasian Economic Union rotates between each of the member states, allowing each state one year to help direct the agenda of the EEU.

The national governments appoint 3 members each to the Eurasian Commission (in accord with all the heads of state of the EEU), 2 members each to the Eurasian Court (in accord with other members) and the Eurasian Development Bank. Representation is therefore designed to prevent larger states from carrying more weight in negotiations.

== Ratification status of treaties ==
Treaty on the Eurasian Economic Union

Signatory	Date	Institution	In favour	Against	AB	Deposited	Reference
Belarus	9 Oct 2014	Council of the Republic	64	0	0	1 Jan 2015	
Belarus	9 Oct 2014	House of Representatives	Approved			1 Jan 2015	
Belarus	9 Oct 2014	Presidential Assent	Granted			1 Jan 2015	
Kazakhstan	9 Oct 2014	Senate	Approved			1 Jan 2015	
Kazakhstan	1 Oct 2014	Majilis	101	0	3	1 Jan 2015	
Kazakhstan	14 Oct 2014	Presidential Assent	Granted			1 Jan 2015	
Russia	1 Oct 2014	Federation Council	140	0	0	1 Jan 2015	
Russia	26 Sep 2014	State Duma	441	0	1	1 Jan 2015	
Russia	3 Oct 2014	Presidential Assent	Granted			1 Jan 2015	

Treaty on the accession of the Republic of Armenia to the Treaty on the Eurasian Economic Union

Signatory	Date	Institution	In favour	Against	AB	Deposited	Reference
Armenia	4 Dec 2014	National Assembly	103	7	1	2 Jan 2015	
Armenia	30 Dec 2014	Presidential Assent	Granted			2 Jan 2015	
Belarus	19 Dec 2014	Council of the Republic	Approved			2 Jan 2015	
Belarus	19 Dec 2014	House of Representatives	Approved			2 Jan 2015	
Belarus	29 Dec 2014	Presidential Assent	Granted			2 Jan 2015	
Kazakhstan	19 Dec 2014	Senate	Approved			2 Jan 2015	
Kazakhstan	18 Dec 2014	Majilis	Approved			2 Jan 2015	
Kazakhstan	24 Dec 2014	Presidential Assent	Granted			2 Jan 2015	
Russia	17 Dec 2014	Federation Council	149	0	0	2 Jan 2015	
Russia	10 Dec 2014	State Duma	441	1	0	2 Jan 2015	
Russia	22 Dec 2014	Presidential Assent	Granted			2 Jan 2015	

Treaty on the accession of the Kyrgyz Republic to the Treaty on the Eurasian Economic Union

Signatory	Date	Institution	In favour	Against	AB	Deposited	Reference
Armenia	16 Jun 2015	National Assembly	91	4	0	12 Aug 2015	
Armenia	18 Jun 2015	Presidential Assent	Granted			12 Aug 2015	
Belarus	26 Jun 2015	Council of the Republic	Approved			12 Aug 2015	
Belarus	30 Jun 2015	House of Representatives	Approved			12 Aug 2015	
Belarus	24 Jul 2015	Presidential Assent	Granted			12 Aug 2015	
Kazakhstan	1 Jul 2015	Majilis	Approved			12 Aug 2015	
Kazakhstan	9 Jul 2015	Senate	Approved			12 Aug 2015	
Kazakhstan	5 Aug 2015	Presidential Assent	Granted			12 Aug 2015	
Kyrgyzstan	20 May 2015	Supreme Council	96	2	0	12 Aug 2015	
Kyrgyzstan	21 May 2015	Presidential Assent	Granted			12 Aug 2015	
Russia	01 Jul 2015	State Duma	437	0	2	12 Aug 2015	
Russia	08 Jul 2015	Federation Council	Approved			12 Aug 2015	
Russia	13 Jul 2015	Presidential Assent	Granted			12 Aug 2015	

== See also ==
- Commonwealth of Independent States
- Eurasian Economic Union
- Eurasianism
- Post-Soviet states
- Shanghai Cooperation Organization
