= Union Pacific (disambiguation) =

The Union Pacific Railroad is a Class I railroad in the United States.

Union Pacific may also refer to:

- Union Pacific Corporation, the parent company of Union Pacific Railroad
- Union Pacific, a 1934 ballet by Nicolas Nabokov and Léonide Massine, Ballet Russe de Monte-Carlo
- Union Pacific (film), a 1939 film directed by Cecil B. DeMille and starring Barbara Stanwyck and Joel McCrea
- Union Pacific (TV series), a Western television series
- Union Pacific (board game), a board game by Alan R. Moon, third place for the Deutscher Spiele Preis
- Union Pacific (restaurant), an American restaurant based in New York City

== See also ==
- Pacific Union
