= Supreme Eurasian Economic Council =

The Supreme Eurasian Economic Council (Armenian: Բարձրագույն Եվրասիական տնտեսական խորհուրդը; Belarusian: Вышэйшы Еўразійскі эканамічны савет; Kazakh: Жоғары Еуразиялық экономикалық кеңес; Kyrgyz: Жогорку Евразия экономикалык кеңеши; Russian: Высший Евразийский экономический совет) is the highest supranational body of the Eurasian Economic Union.

In the Supreme Eurasian Economic Council composed of the Heads of State or Government of member states of the Eurasian Economic Union. Going on the level of heads of state at least once a year. Decisions are taken by consensus. The decisions are binding on all States parties. The Board determines the composition and powers of other regulatory agencies.

== Members ==
Council members as of May 2026:

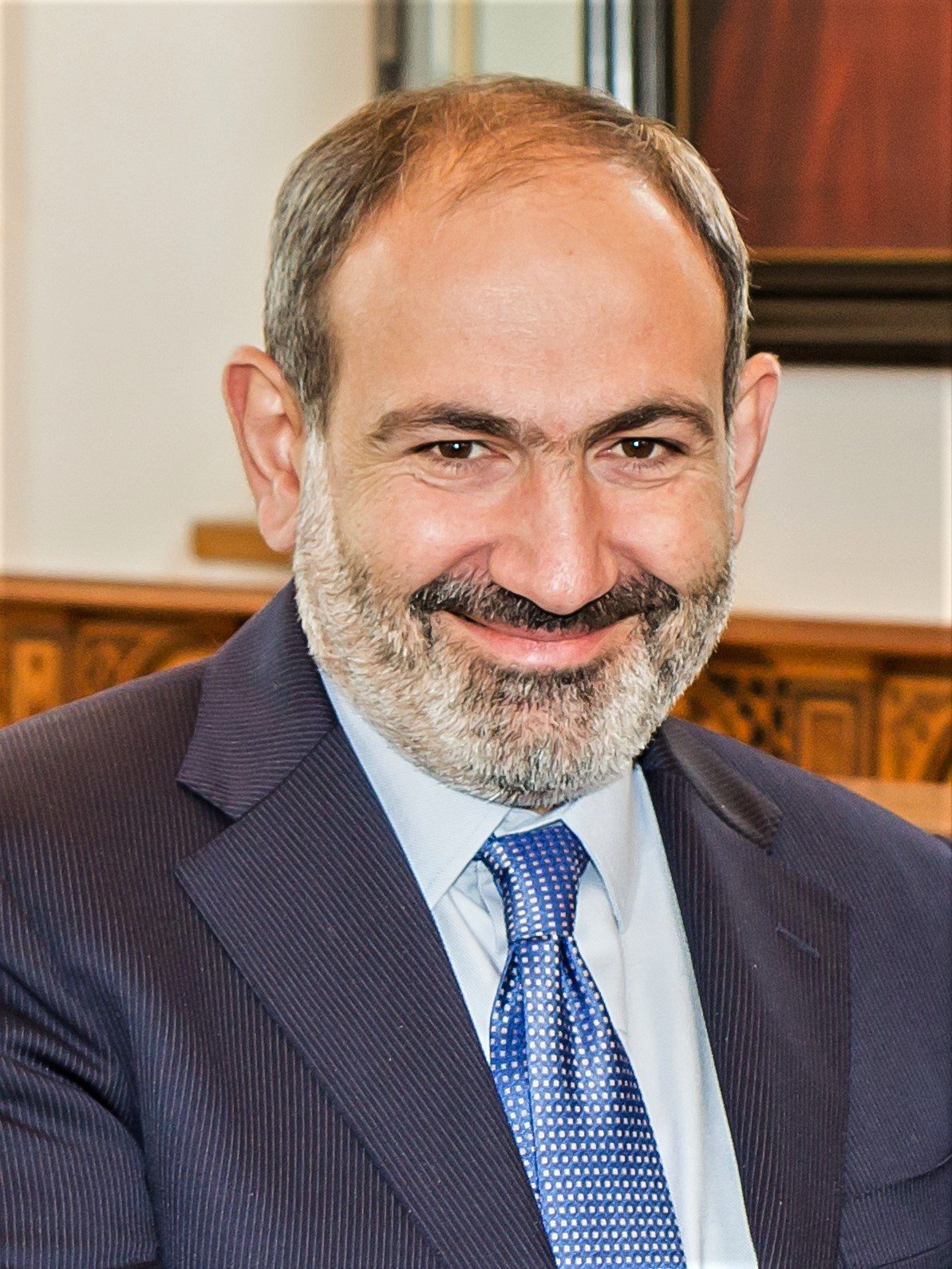
Armenia
Nikol Pashinyan, Prime Minister

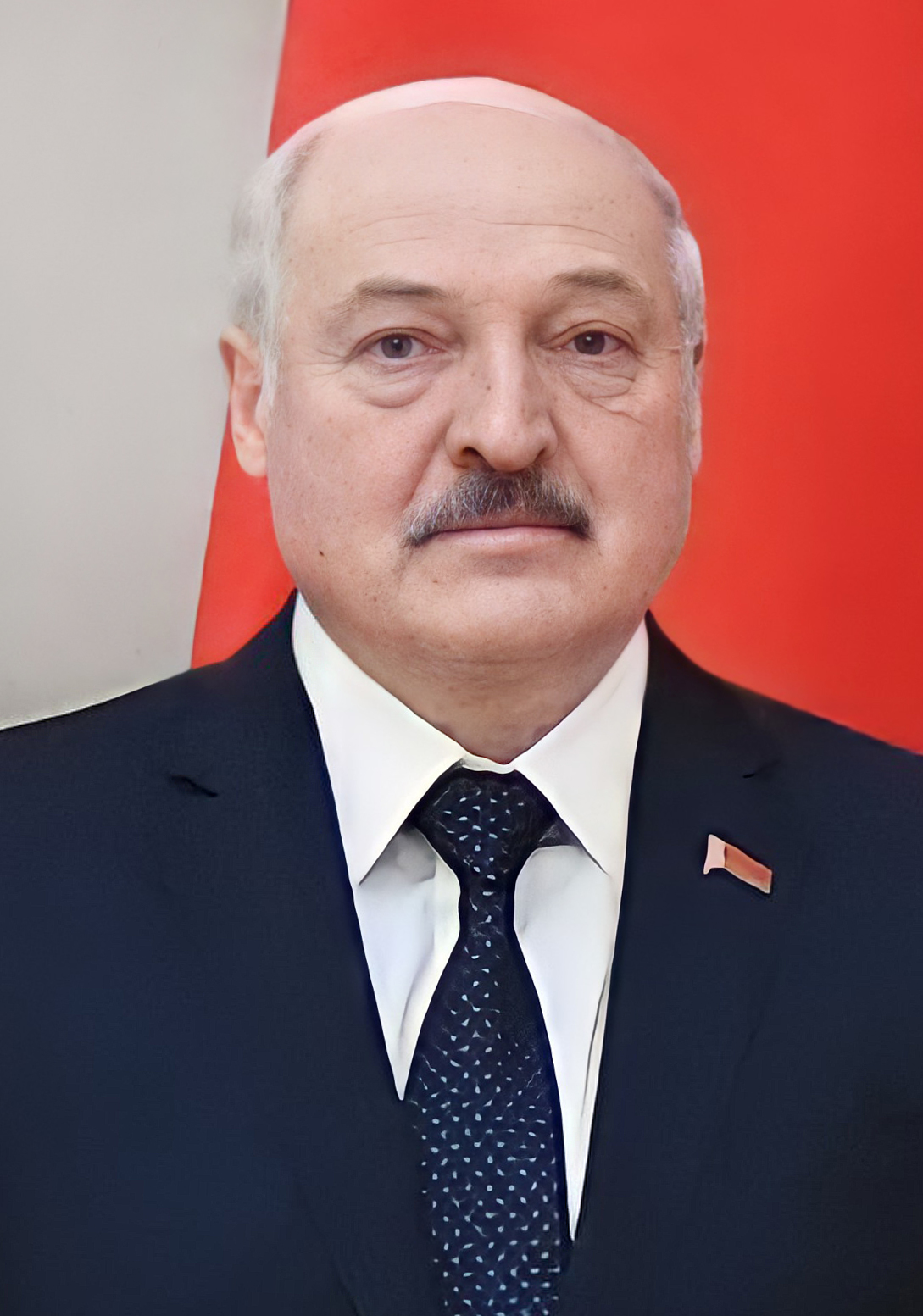
Belarus
Alexander Lukashenka, President

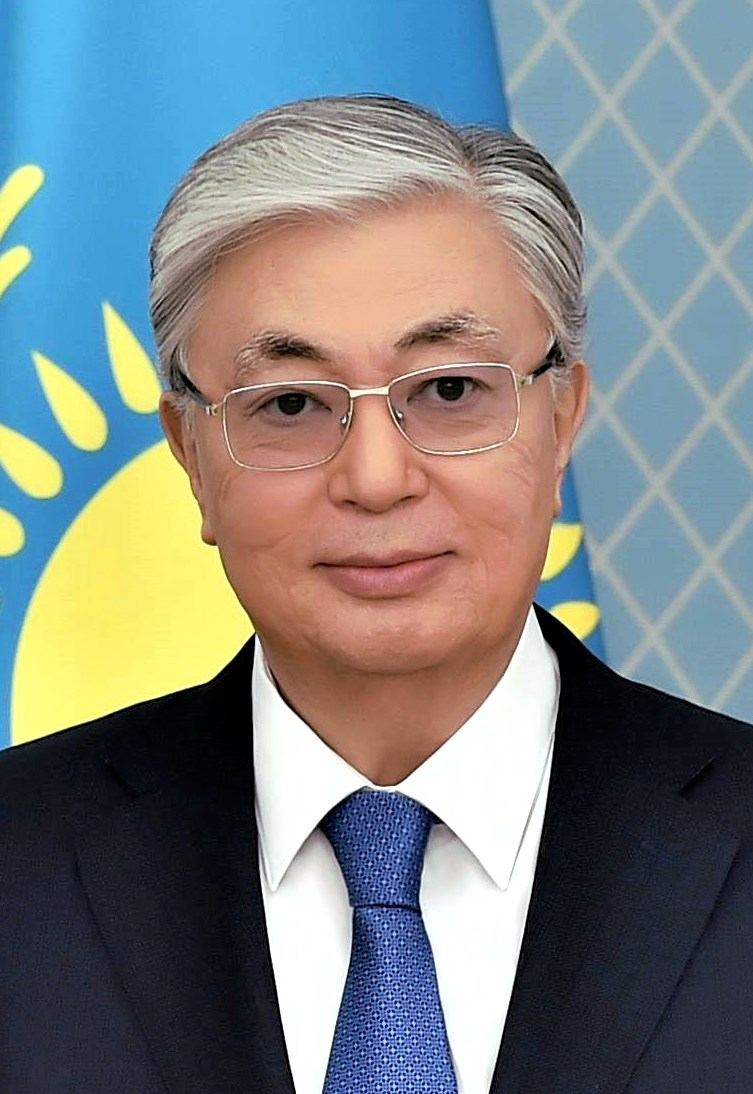
Kazakhstan
Kassym-Jomart Tokayev, President

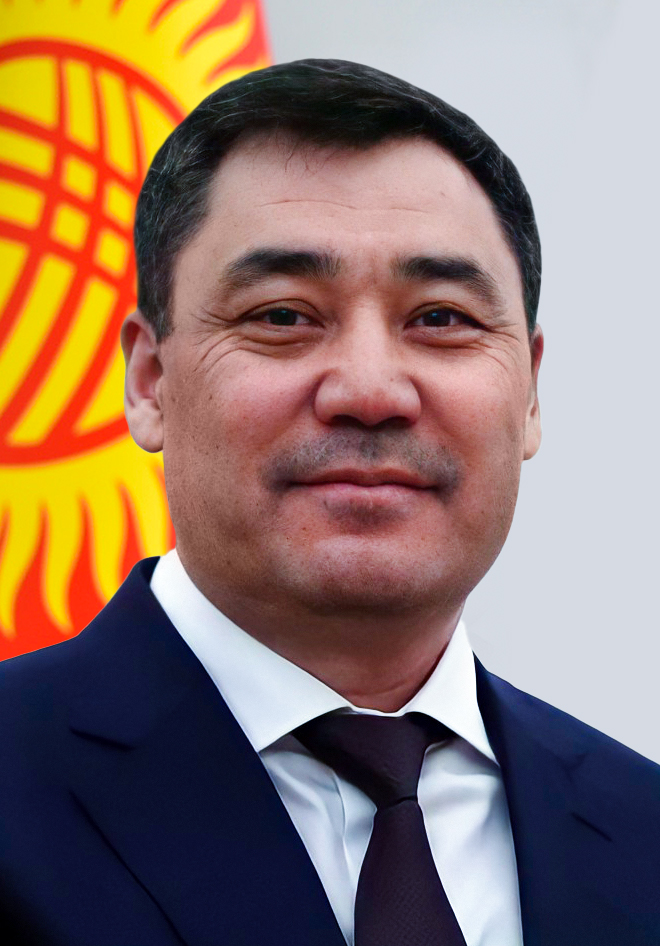
Kyrgyzstan
Sadyr Japarov, President

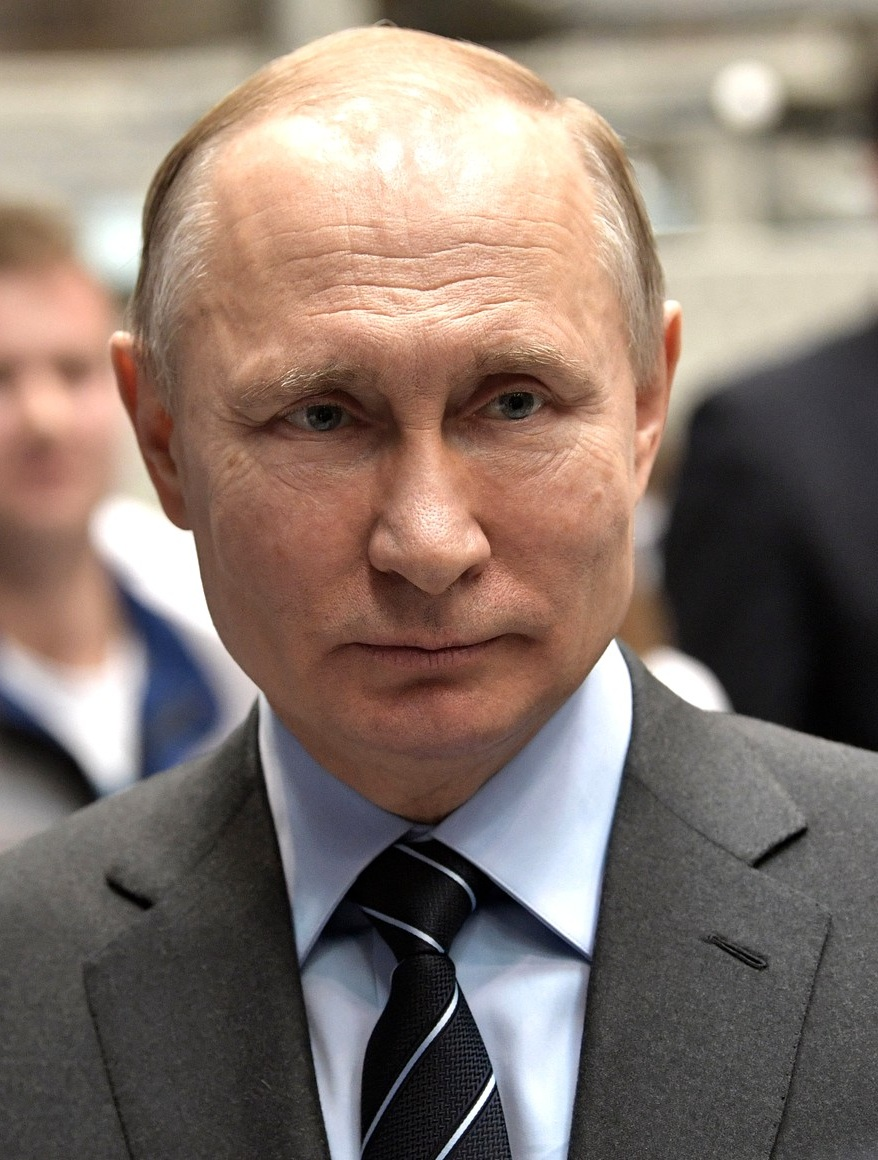
Russia
Vladimir Putin, President

== Chronology ==
| Year | Armenia | Belarus | Kazakhstan | Kyrgyzstan | Russia |
|---|---|---|---|---|---|
| 2015 | Serzh Sargsyan | Alexander Lukashenko | Nursultan Nazarbayev | Almazbek Atambayev | Vladimir Putin |
| 2016 | Serzh Sargsyan | Alexander Lukashenko | Nursultan Nazarbayev | Almazbek Atambayev | Vladimir Putin |
| 2017 | Serzh Sargsyan | Alexander Lukashenko | Nursultan Nazarbayev | Almazbek Atambayev | Vladimir Putin |
| 2017 | Serzh Sargsyan | Alexander Lukashenko | Nursultan Nazarbayev | Sooronbay Jeenbekov | Vladimir Putin |
| 2018 | Serzh Sargsyan | Alexander Lukashenko | Nursultan Nazarbayev | Sooronbay Jeenbekov | Vladimir Putin |
| 2018 | Nikol Pashinyan | Alexander Lukashenko | Nursultan Nazarbayev | Sooronbay Jeenbekov | Vladimir Putin |
| 2019 | Nikol Pashinyan | Alexander Lukashenko | Nursultan Nazarbayev | Sooronbay Jeenbekov | Vladimir Putin |
| 2019 | Nikol Pashinyan | Alexander Lukashenko | Kassym-Jomart Tokayev | Sooronbay Jeenbekov | Vladimir Putin |
| 2020 | Nikol Pashinyan | Alexander Lukashenko | Kassym-Jomart Tokayev | Sooronbay Jeenbekov | Vladimir Putin |
| 2020 | Nikol Pashinyan | Alexander Lukashenko | Kassym-Jomart Tokayev | Sadyr Japarov (acting) | Vladimir Putin |
| 2020 | Nikol Pashinyan | Alexander Lukashenko | Kassym-Jomart Tokayev | Talant Mamytov (acting) | Vladimir Putin |
| 2021 | Nikol Pashinyan | Alexander Lukashenko | Kassym-Jomart Tokayev | Talant Mamytov (acting) | Vladimir Putin |
| 2021 | Nikol Pashinyan | Alexander Lukashenko | Kassym-Jomart Tokayev | Sadyr Japarov | Vladimir Putin |
| 2022 | Nikol Pashinyan | Alexander Lukashenko | Kassym-Jomart Tokayev | Sadyr Japarov | Vladimir Putin |
| 2023 | Nikol Pashinyan | Alexander Lukashenko | Kassym-Jomart Tokayev | Sadyr Japarov | Vladimir Putin |
| 2024 | Nikol Pashinyan | Alexander Lukashenko | Kassym-Jomart Tokayev | Sadyr Japarov | Vladimir Putin |

== See also ==
- Eurasian Economic Commission
