= Central Asian Union =

Intergovernmental organisation for economic integration

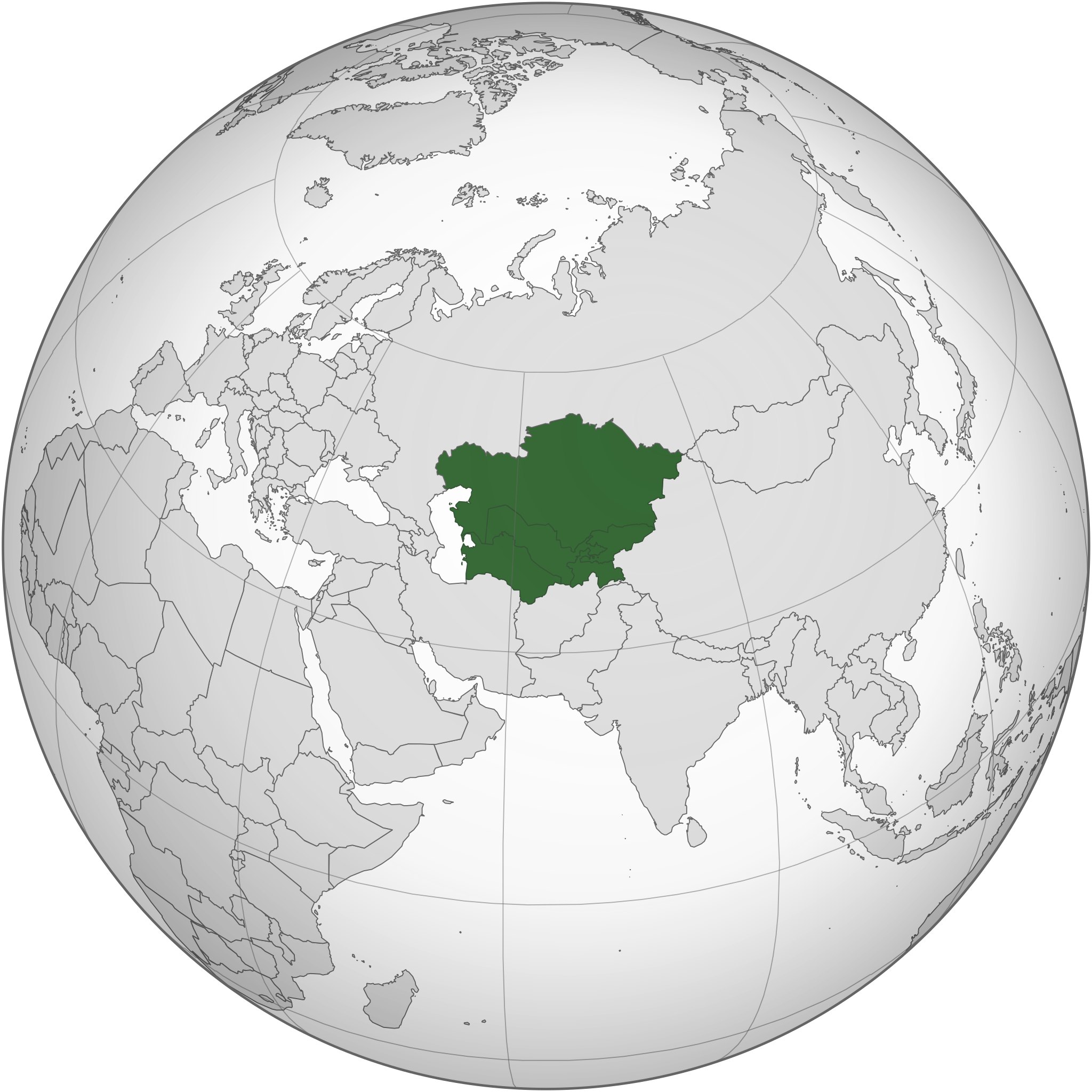
The proposed Central Asian Union, covering the five Central Asian states.

The Central Asian Union (CAU), also called the Central Asian Economic Union (CAEU), was an intergovernmental organization for economic integration between the Central Asian post-Soviet republics between 1994 and 2004. Initially composed of Kazakhstan, Kyrgyzstan and Uzbekistan at launch, membership of the Union was extended to Tajikistan in 1998.

Having been through a number of incarnations including the Central Asian Economic Community (CAEC) and the Central Asian Cooperation Organization (CACO), the Union was eventually subsumed into the Eurasian Economic Community (EurAsEC) in 2005, a year after Russia being granted membership.

== History ==
The concept of a Central Asian union emerged soon after the dissolution of the Soviet Union in 1991. Although all states acceded to the newly formed Commonwealth of Independent States (CIS), it was felt that more regional cooperation was needed.

=== Central Asian Union (1994-1997) ===
The three republics of Kazakhstan, Kyrgyzstan and Uzbekistan signed a treaty on 23 September 1993 to create an economic union, which was followed by a proclamation of a "single economic space" on 10 February 1994. The Central Asian Union (CAU) was formally established on 8 July 1994, with an Interstate Council made up of heads of state, an Executive Committee as the permanent working body in Almaty, and a Central Asian Bank for Cooperation and Development (CABCD). The Central Asian Union was also known interchangeably as the Central Asian Economic Union (CAEU).

In theory, any CIS member state could join the Union. However, since early 1992 Tajikistan had been plunged into the Tajikistani Civil War between government forces and various Islamist rebel factions supported by the Taliban; thus they could not participate in the integration process, though they joined the CAU as an observer in 1996. Meanwhile, Turkmenistan preferred to maintain neutrality, and decided not to partake in CIS or Central Asian integration.

The CAU was also given a military dimension. A Council of Defence Ministers was formed, and, under the aegis of the United Nations, a peacekeeping force was formed, which held its first training exercises on the territory of Kazakhstan and Uzbekistan in September 1997.

=== Central Asian Economic Community (1998-2001) ===
Following Tajikistan's signing of a peace agreement in June 1997, the three CAU member states agreed to the country joining the integration process on 5 January 1998, at a summit in Ashgabat. With Tajikistan's accession formalised in March 1998, the CAU was renamed the Central Asian Economic Community (CAEC).

Alongside Tajikistan's historical accession, the CAU trio had recognised the need to consolidate. Thus the focus of the new CAEC was on strengthening the union institutionally, removing customs barriers, and addressing economic stability.

Over the next few years, however, CAEC made little progress towards establishing a free trade area or a common market. Economic integration had proved difficult for a number of reasons. First, the states found themselves on different economic paths, with Uzbekistan retaining Soviet-style economic policies while Kazakhstan and Kyrgyzstan turned towards market-oriented reform. And as newly-independent states, members were finding it hard to subordinate their national interests in favour of a supranational institution. In addition, Kazakhstan and Uzbekistan found themselves vying for the leadership of the CAEC and the region more broadly.

=== Central Asian Cooperation Organization (2002-2005) ===
By the early 2000s, the CAEC's economic struggles were becoming clear, and the emergence of more robust alternative frameworks – like the Russian-led Eurasian Economic Community (EurAsEC) – raised questions about the bloc's viability and potential duplication. As a result, at a summit in Tashkent on 28 December 2001, leaders of the member states agreed to pivot away from purely economic issues and towards stability, peacekeeping, and political cooperation. The union was renamed the Central Asian Cooperation Organization (CACO).

The new CACO held its first summit in Almaty on 28 February 2002. Its new focus was on countering terrorism, extremism, drug trafficking, and other transnational threats. However, its importance had been downgraded. Although it was built on the remains of the CAEC's institutional foundations, the Executive Committee had been replaced by a Committee of National Coordinators at deputy minister level.

=== The end of the union ===
In 2004, Russia applied for membership of the CACO. Unable to turn Moscow down at the time, the Central Asian states approved the request and Russia's accession was formally recognised at a summit in Dushanbe on 18 October 2004. This fundamentally changed the nature of the group and shifted its focus towards Russian-led regional security frameworks. CACO's last summit was held in Saint Petersburg on 6-7 October 2005, during which leaders of the member states agreed to merge CACO into EurAsEC.

=== Central Asian cooperation since 2005 ===
Economic integration efforts in Central Asia have since largely been dominated by extra-regional superpowers – for example Russia through EurAsEC and China through the Shanghai Cooperation Organisation (SCO).

There have been multiple initiatives announced to strengthen ties between the five states, but efforts outside the umbrella of global superpowers like Russia, China or the United States – or even regional powers like Turkey and Iran – have typically been bilateral in nature. However, the vision of a regional organisation composed only of Central Asian states endured, in particular for Kazakhstan’s President Nursultan Nazarbayev.

As far back as 2005, Nazarbayev proposed a Central Asian Union on the model of the European Union. In his proposal, the Kazakh President said:

"In the region, we share economic interest, cultural heritage, language, religion, and environmental challenges, and face common external threats. The founding fathers of the European Union could only wish they had so much in common. We should direct our efforts towards closer economic integration, a common market and a single currency."

In 2007, Kazakhstan and Kyrgyzstan announced the creation of a bilateral "International Supreme Council" and increased political and economic collaboration – along with the intention to establish a Central Asian union to resolve intra-regional disputes over energy and water. If realised, the CAU would represent a counterbalance to the existing Russian-dominated Collective Security Organization and the Chinese-Russian-led Shanghai Cooperation Organisation.

Kazakhstan and Uzbekistan did also decide to set up a free trade zone in 2008. However, the proposed new Central Asian union was outright rejected by then Uzbek president Islam Karimov that same year, despite the project having the support of the presidents of Kazakhstan, Kyrgyzstan and Tajikistan. After Karimov died in 2016, however, the idea of integration has been back on the table.

Under the leadership of the new Uzbek president Shavkat Mirziyoyev, the presidents of all five Central Asian states met in Astana on 15 March 2018. This was the first summit between Central Asian leaders in nearly a decade. These consultative meetings have since been held every year apart from 2020, and now serve as a regular mechanism for regional dialogue without the need for a formal, rigid institution.

== List of Central Asian leader summits ==
- Ashgabat, Turkmenistan (1991)
- Tashkent, Uzbekistan(1993)
- Daşoguz, Turkmenistan (1995)
- Ashgabat, Turkmenistan (1998)
- Ashgabat, Turkmenistan (1999)
- Almaty, Kazakhstan (2009)

Consultative Meeting of the Heads of State of Central Asia:

- Astana, Kazakhstan (2018)
- Tashkent, Uzbekistan (2019)
- Awaza, Turkmenistan (2021)
- Cholpon-Ata, Kyrgyzstan (2022)
- Dushanbe, Tajikistan (2023)
- Astana, Kazakhstan (2024)
- Tashkent, Uzbekistan (2025)
- Awaza, Turkmenistan (2026)

== Members ==
Country	Membership	Population	Area (km^{2})	GDP (nominal)	GDP per capita (nominal)	GDP (PPP)	GDP per capita (PPP)
Kazakhstan	Joined in July 1994	20,500,000 (62nd)	2,724,900 (9th)	$319.770 billion (49th)	$15,527 (69th)	$973.357 billion (37th)	$47,263 (48th)
Kyrgyzstan	Joined in July 1994	7,404,300 (104th)	199,951 (85th)	$21.563 billion (128th)	$2,925 (144th)	$68.694 billion (120th)	$9,318 (133rd)
Uzbekistan	Joined in July 1994	38,230,000 (38th)	448,978 (56th)	$159.199 billion (60th)	$4,136 (132nd)	$511.017 billion (54th)	$13,276 (118th)
Tajikistan	Joined in March 1998	10,499,000 (89th)	142,326 (94th)	$18.941 billion (133rd)	$1,799 (158th)	$67.749 billion (122nd)	$6,434 (149th)
Turkmenistan	Associate but non-member	7,057,841 (105th)	491,210 (52nd)	$76.897 billion (85th)	$11,387 (82nd)	$158.975 billion (89th)	$23,542 (80th)
Total		83,691,141^{(19th)}	4,007,275^{(7th)}	$596.370 billion^{(30th)}	$7,126.6^{(105th)}	$1,779.792 billion^{(27th)}	$21,266^{(94th)}

== See also ==
- Continental union
- Eurasian Economic Union
- Economic Cooperation Organization
- African Union
- Arab Union
- North American Union
- Pacific Union
- Organization of Turkic States
- European Union
- Union of South American Nations
