= Pacific Union =

Intergovernmental project

- Map indicating members of the Pacific Islands Forum (potential Pacific Union).
- Potential members: 16 states and 2 dependencies: Australia; Cook Islands; FS Micronesia; Fiji; France (New Caledonia and French Polynesia); Kiribati; Marshall Islands; Nauru; New Zealand; Niue; Palau; Papua New Guinea; Samoa; Solomon Islands; Tonga; Tuvalu; Vanuatu

Area
  - Total: 13,962,549 km^{2} (5,390,970 sq mi)

Population
  - 2008 estimate: 40 million
  - Density: 4/km^{2} (10.4/sq mi)
- GDP (nominal): 2012 estimate
  - Total: US$ 1.689 trillion
  - Per capita: US$ 28,543
- Currency: 12 currencies: Australian dollar; CFP franc; Cook Islands dollar^{a}; Fijian dollar; Kiribati dollar^{b}; New Zealand dollar; Pa'anga; Papua New Guinean kina; Solomon Islands dollar; Samoan tala; Tuvaluan dollar^{b}; United States dollar; Vanuatu vatu; ^{a} Pegged to NZ dollar.; ^{b} Pegged to Australian dollar.

The Pacific Union is a proposed development of the Pacific Islands Forum, first suggested in 2003 by a committee of the Australian Senate, into a political and economic intergovernmental community. The union, if formed, would have a common charter, institutions and currency. Although John Howard, the former Prime Minister of Australia, spoke of a Pacific Union whilst in office, his government's emphasis was focused on bilateral relations and agreements with the individual states of the Forum.

== Existing integration ==
The most prominent example of pre-existing regionalism amongst countries of the Pacific Ocean is the Pacific Islands Forum, an intergovernmental organisation that aims to represent the interests of its members and enhance cooperation between them. The Pacific Islands Forum does not have a common charter, institutions or currency.

The Closer Economic Relations (CER) free trade agreement between the governments of New Zealand and Australia allows the free trade of most goods and services between the two nations without tariff barriers or export incentives. The Melanesian Spearhead Group is a more recent trade treaty governing the four Melanesian states of Vanuatu, Papua New Guinea, the Solomon Islands and recently, Fiji. The nations of Australia, Nauru, Kiribati and Tuvalu use the Australian dollar while the Cook Islands, Niue, Tokelau, and New Zealand use the New Zealand Dollar.

In October 2000, national leaders of the Pacific Islands Forum signed the Biketawa Declaration constituting a framework for coordinating response to regional crises leading to New Zealand and Australian military and police forces participating in regional peacekeeping/stabilisation operations in Papua New Guinea (in Bougainville), Solomon Islands (2003–present), Nauru (2004–present) and Tonga (2006).

== Future prospects ==
There has been a call from within both the Australian and New Zealand business communities to extend the Closer Economic Relations (CER) Free Trade Agreement to other Pacific Island nations, moving towards a single market and allowing the free movement of people and goods. Harmonising both the CER and the Pacific Regional Trade Agreement is one possibility of moving towards this goal. The idea's future has become somewhat confused with the Rudd government's call for an Asia-Pacific Community, which would have a wider membership than a Pacific Union.

== See also ==
- CANZUK
- Caribbean Community and Common Market
- Continental union
  - African Union
  - Central Asian Union
  - ASEAN
  - Commonwealth of Independent States
  - Eurasian Economic Union
  - European Union
  - Latin American Integration Association
  - North American Union
    - North American Free Trade Agreement
  - Central American Integration System
  - Union of South American Nations
    - Mercosur
