= Eurasian Economic Community =

Regional economic organisation

Eurasian Economic Community Евразийское экономическое сообщество (Russian)
- 2000–2014
- Status: Regional organization
- Capital: Moscow (Commission)
- Former member states: Belarus; Kazakhstan; Kyrgyzstan; Russia; Tajikistan
- History
  - Established: 10 October 2000
  - OCAC merger: 25 January 2006
  - Customs Union: 1 January 2010
  - Single Economic Space: 25 January 2012
  - Terminated: 31 December 2014
  - EEU established: 1 January 2015
Succeeded by
Eurasian Economic Union
- Today part of: Eurasian Economic Union

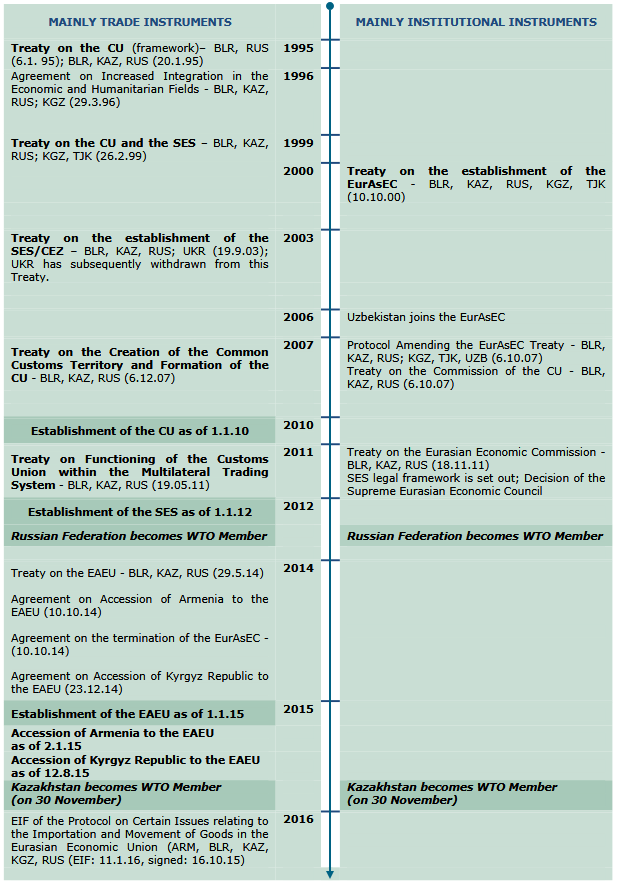
Timeline of EAEU Integration from the World Trade Organization report.

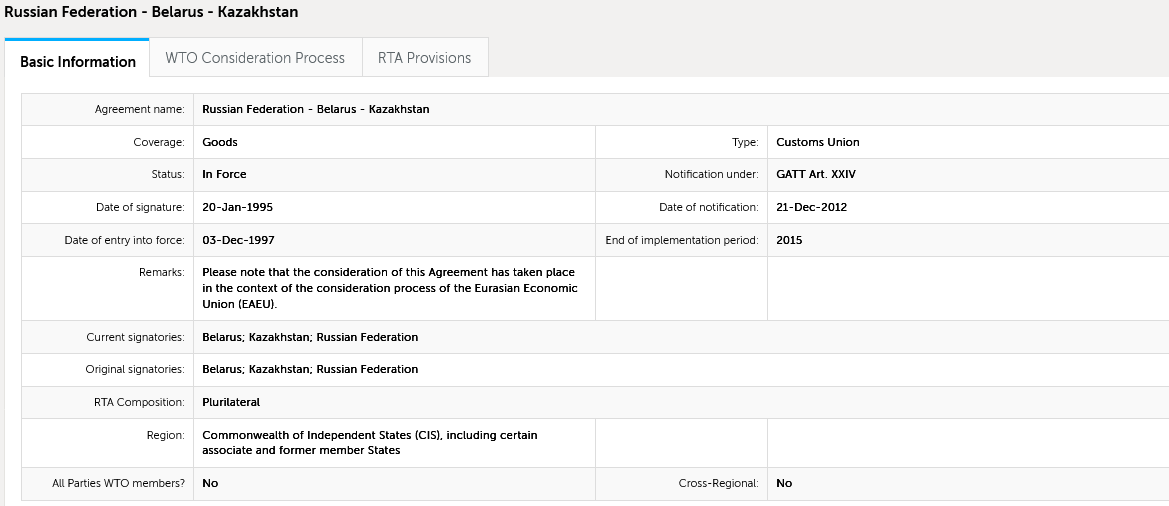
Regional Trade Agreements Database of the World Trade Organization.

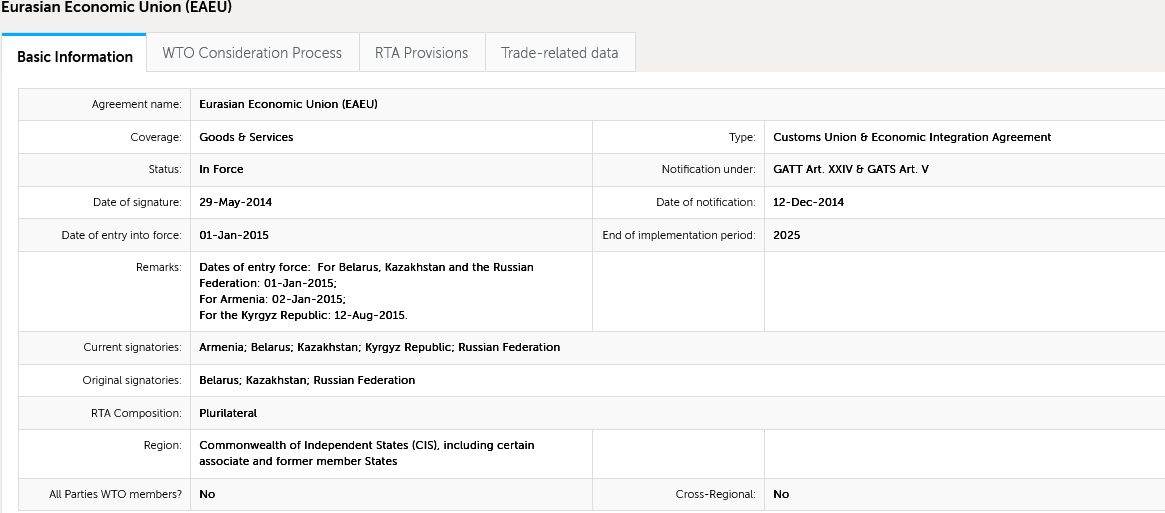
Regional Trade Agreements Database of the World Trade Organization.

The Eurasian Economic Community (EAEC or EurAsEC) was a regional organisation between 2000 and 2014 which aimed for the economic integration of its member states. The organisation originated from the Commonwealth of Independent States (CIS) on 29 March 1996, with the treaty on the establishment of the Eurasian Economic Community signed on 10 October 2000 in Kazakhstan's capital Astana by Presidents Alexander Lukashenko of Belarus, Nursultan Nazarbayev of Kazakhstan, Askar Akayev of Kyrgyzstan, Vladimir Putin of Russia, and Emomali Rahmon of Tajikistan. Uzbekistan joined the community on 7 October 2005, but later withdrew on 16 October 2008.

During the 14 years, the EAEC implemented a number of economic policies to unify the community. The Customs Union of Belarus, Kazakhstan, and Russia was formed on 1 January 2010, and later renamed the Eurasian Customs Union. The four freedoms of movement modelled after the European Union (goods, capital, services, and people) were fully implemented by 25 January 2012, with the formation of the Eurasian Economic Space.

On 10 October 2014, an agreement on the termination of the Eurasian Economic Community was signed in Minsk after a session of the Interstate Council of the EAEC. The Eurasian Economic Community was terminated from 1 January 2015 in connection with the launch of the Eurasian Economic Union. While the Eurasian Economic Union effectively replaces the community, membership negotiations with Tajikistan are still ongoing. All other EAEC members have joined the new union.

== Membership ==
=== Members ===
- Belarus
- Kazakhstan
- Kyrgyzstan
- Russia
- Tajikistan

Uzbekistan was previously a member of the EAEC, however it suspended its membership in 2008.

In accordance with the Charter of the EurAsEC, observer status could be granted to the states or intergovernmental organizations at their request. The observers had the right to attend the public meetings of the Eurasian Economic Community, to speak at these meetings and with the consent of the presiding officer to obtain public documents and decisions taken by the Community. Observer status did not allow states to take part in decision-making at the meetings of the Eurasian Economic Community. Observer states were:

== Aims ==
The Eurasian Economic Community was established for effective promotion of the creation by the Customs Union member states of a Single Economic Space and for coordinating their approaches while integrating into the world economy and the international trade system. One of the Organization's chief activity vectors is ensuring the dynamic evolution of the Community states through coordinating their economic and social reforms while effectively using their economic potentials to improve the living standards of their peoples. Among the principal tasks of the Community are:

- completing the formalization of a free trade regime in all respects, creating a unified customs tariff and a unified system of nontariff regulation measures;
- laying down the common rules for trade in goods and services and their access to internal markets;
- Ensuring the free movement of capital
- introducing a unified procedure for foreign exchange controls;
- creating a common unified system of customs regulation;
- Harmonization of economies for the transition to a future single currency
- drawing up and implementing joint programs of economic and social development;
- creating equal conditions for production and entrepreneurial activities;
- forming a common market for transportation services and a unified transport system;
- forming a common energy market;
- creating equal conditions for access by foreign investment to the sides' markets;
- giving the citizens of the Community states equal rights in receiving education and medical assistance throughout its territory;
- converging and harmonizing national legislation;
- ensuring the coordination of the legal systems of the Eurasian Economic Community states with a view to creating a common legal space within the Community.

== Institutional framework ==
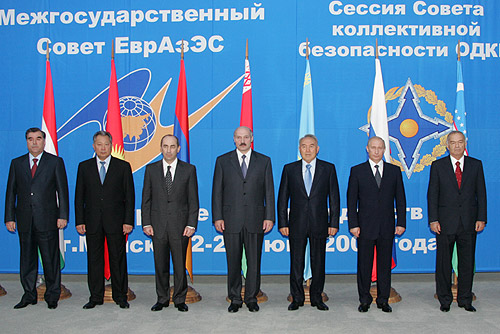
Representatives of EAEC and CSTO.

- Interstate Council
- Integration Committee
  - Energy Policy Council
  - Transport Policy Council
  - Council on Border Issues
  - Council of Heads of Customs Services
  - Council of Heads of Tax Services
  - Council of Ministers of Justice
- Secretariat
- Commission of Permanent Representatives
- Interparliamentary Assembly
- Community's Court of Justice

=== Interstate Council ===
The supreme body of the Eurasian Economic Community is composed of the Heads of State and Government of the member states. The Interstate Council considers the main issues of the Community relating to the common interests of member states, determines the strategy, direction and prospects of integration and takes decisions aimed at achieving the goals and objectives of the Community. The Interstate Council meets at the level of Heads of State at least once a year, and the heads of government - at least twice a year. The council takes decisions by consensus. The decisions taken are binding on all Member States of the Community.

=== Integration Committee ===
The Integration Committee is a permanent organ of the Eurasec. It consists of deputy heads of governments of the countries of the Community. The Integration Committee meetings must be held at least four times a year.

In integration, the committee's decisions are taken by a two-thirds majority.

Every member state has a certain number of votes:

- Russia - 40 votes
- Belarus - 15 votes
- Kazakhstan - 15 votes
- Kyrgyzstan - 7.5 votes
- Tajikistan - 7.5 votes
- Uzbekistan (suspended) - 15 votes

Some boards and commissions within the Integration Committee:

- Commission for the protection of national markets;
- Commission on cooperation in the field of export control;
- Commission on technical regulations, sanitary, veterinary and phytosanitary trade;
- Commission on Tariffs and non-tariff regulation;
- Cooperation Council In the field of atomic energy for peaceful purposes;
- Council for Culture;
- Council of the agro-industrial policy;
- Council Transportation Policy;
- Council for Energy Policy;
- Council on Migration Policy;
- Council of Social Policy;
- Council on Intellectual Property.
- Board of Health;
- Board of Education;
- Board of Environmental Protection;
- Chief Executives Board authorized to regulate the securities market body;
- Council of Heads of Tax Services;
- Council of Heads of insurance supervision and regulation of insurance business;
- Council of Heads of Customs;

=== Secretariat ===
The Secretariat is headed by the Secretary General of the Eurasec, the highest Community official, appointed by the interstate Council. The seats of the Secretariat are in the cities of Almaty (Kazakhstan) and Moscow (Russia).

=== The Interparliamentary Assembly ===
The Interparliamentary Assembly of the Eurasian Economic Community serves as body of parliamentary cooperation in the framework of the Eurasian Economic Community. It addresses the issues of harmonization (convergence, harmonization) of national legislation and bring it into line with the agreements concluded in the framework of the Eurasian Economic Community. Assembly is composed of members of parliament, delegated by the parliaments of member states. Its structure includes:

- Russia: 42 members
- Belarus: 16 members
- Kazakhstan: 16 members
- Kyrgyzstan: 8 members
- Tajikistan: 8 members

The Secretariat of the Interparliamentary Assembly is located in St. Petersburg, Russia.

== Economic data ==
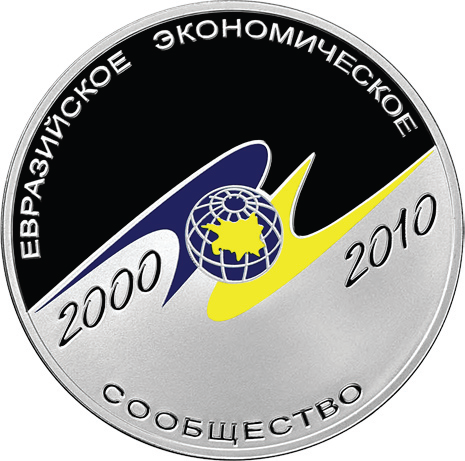

Country	Population	GDP 2011 (In Millions USD)	GDP 2012 (In Millions USD)	per capita
Belarus	9,459,000	59,735	63,259	6,739
Russia	143,455,000	1,899,056	2,021,960	14,247
Kazakhstan	17,027,000	183,107	196,419	11,773
Kyrgyzstan	5,717,000	6,199	6,473	1,158
Uzbekistan	30,214,000	45,353	51,168	1,737
Tajikistan	8,044,000	6,523	7,592	953
EAEC total	213,916,000	2,189,991	2,346,871	10,971

== Economic cooperation ==
=== Single Economic Space ===
After discussion about the creation of a common market between the CIS countries of Russia, Ukraine, Belarus, and Kazakhstan, agreement in principle about the creation of this space was announced after a meeting in the Moscow suburb of Novo-Ogarevo on 23 February 2003. The Common Economic Space would involve a supranational commission on trade and tariffs that would be based in Kyiv, would initially be headed by a representative of Kazakhstan, and would not be subordinate to the governments of the four nations. The ultimate goal would be a regional organisation that would be open for other countries to join as well, and could eventually lead even to a single currency. On 22 May 2003 The Verkhovna Rada (the Ukrainian Parliament) voted 266 votes in favor and 51 against the joint economic space. However, Viktor Yushchenko's victory in the Ukrainian presidential election of 2004 was a significant blow against the project: Yushchenko had shown renewed interest in Ukrainian membership in the European Union, and such membership would have been incompatible with the envisioned common economic space. On March 1, 2010, the first deputy head of the presidential administration of newly elected Ukrainian President Viktor Yanukovych, Iryna Akymova stated that Ukraine does not intend to join the Customs Union of Russia, Kazakhstan and Belarus in the near future "Since the customs union contradicts and will greatly complicate Ukraine's membership in the WTO".

A single market for the Eurasian Economic Community came into effect in January 2012, followed by the creation of the Eurasian Economic Union on 1 January 2015.

=== Customs Union of the Eurasian Economic Union ===
Forming a customs union between EurAsEC member states became a top priority from Spring 2008, when the EU announced its Eastern Partnership. Since that time, there has been discord between the EU and Russia with both sides accusing the other of attempting to carve out spheres of influence over the countries at issue (Belarus, Armenia, Azerbaijan, Georgia, Moldova and Ukraine). A supranational body of the customs union—the Eurasian Economic Commission—was established on December 12, 2008. Boiled down to its essence, Russia has offered EurAsEC members access to its markets (i.e., for Kazakhstan) and lower energy prices (i.e., Belarus, Ukraine). The EU's offer to membership countries amounts to promises of de facto EU integration, such as relaxed visa entry requirements.

Kazakhstani President Nursultan Nazarbayev had proposed the creation of a common noncash currency called yevraz for the community. This would have reportedly helped insulate the countries from the global economic crisis.

On 3 September 2013, EUobserver reported that Armenia had decided to join the Eurasian Customs Union. The website quoted a Russian government communique stating that, "Armenia [has] decided to join the Customs Union and take the necessary practical steps to subsequently participate in the formation of the Eurasian Economic Union."

=== Anti-Crisis Fund ===
On 9 June 2009, Member States of the EurAsEC in collaboration with Armenia, announced the establishment of an anti-crisis of Eurasec Fund to deal with the effects of the 2008 financial crisis.

The Russian Finance Minister, Alexei Kudrin clarified: "The money from the fund will be used to grant sovereign loans and stabilization credits to Member States and to finance interstate investment projects. Therefore, this fund will be a kind of replica of the Regional International Monetary Fund (IMF) and the European Bank for Reconstruction and Development (EBRD). As we know, the IMF provides credit stabilization globally, while the EBRD grants loans for investment projects. Russia has refused to increase the amount of its contribution to the IMF, which would have been used to grant loans to stabilize countries in need around the world. Instead, it creates a regional fund to help its neighbors and allies. "

Belarusian President, Alexander Lukashenko said: "The Eurasian Economic Community will establish a fund of $10 billion to deal with the financial crisis." On June 9, 2009, the Fund was established at a meeting of the EurAsEc.

Russia and Kazakhstan contributed $7.5 billion and $1 billion respectively to the anti-crisis fund.

== History ==
=== Origins of the Eurasian Economic Community ===
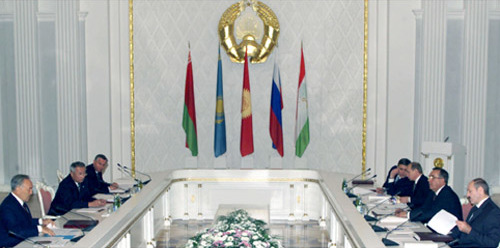
Summit of the EurAsEC on 31 May 2001

On 29 March 1994, during a speech at Moscow State University, the first President of Kazakhstan, Nursultan Nazarbayev complained that the CIS was inadequate and did not provide the integration that the countries badly needed. He proposed the creation of a Eurasian Union of States as a new organisation completely separate from the CIS. The Eurasian Union of States was proposed as a combination of the economic union and political union. For the first time it was suggested to use the name "Eurasian" for an economic union rather than "Euro-Asian" or "Euroasian". The Eurasian Economic Union traces its history back to Nazarbayev's proposal.

On October 10, 2000, when reforms on the CIS were reached the Eurasian Economic Community was formed. The EurAsEC aimed to erase the failures of the CIS, to form a true common market, face the challenges of globalization and to resume the integration processes within the CIS. Very quickly, the EurAsEC emerged as the economic complement of the CSTO.

=== The dissolution of the CEC into the EurAsEC ===
In 2004, Russia joined the Central Asian Cooperation Organization (CACO) in order to strengthen its presence in Central Asia. Soon after, Moscow expressed its desire to dissolve the CACO in the EurAsEC. In late 2005, Uzbekistan argued for its accession to the EurAsEC, which led other members of the CACO to negotiate and eventually merge the two organizations. This merge was effective on January 25, 2006. Most of the functions of the Central Asian Cooperation Organization were transferred to the EurAsEC since 2006.

However the status of current observers of the CACO that are not observers of EurAsEC is not yet settled (including Georgia and Turkey, the latter activist which is also for accession to the European Union) .

Members wanted the EurAsEC to become a viable economic bloc between the powerful EU in the West, and the growing economies in the east, which established the ASEAN).

=== Uzbekistan's withdrawal from the EurAsEC ===
On October 16, 2008, Uzbekistan submitted an official note to the EurAsEC Secretariat, requesting to withdraw from the Eurasian Economic Community (EurAsEC). Although Uzbekistan has not given any official reason, many interpret the move as an attempt to revive stagnating relations with the West and to assertively dismissing Russian influence. Other views interpret Uzbekistan's move as a nationalist attempt in response to an economic crisis, in order to regain tighter control over its economy.

=== Legacy of the Eurasian Economic Community ===
The Customs Union members—Kazakhstan, Belarus and Russia—reached an agreement on a unified customs tariff in June 2009 and endorsed a schedule for creating a unified customs territory. The new Customs Union is intended to go into effect on July 1, 2010

The Russian, Kazakhstani, and Belarusian leaders have approved documents to establish a “single economic space” on 1 January 2012 – a single market for goods, investment, and labor.

On 29 May 2014, a meeting of the Supreme Eurasian Economic Council took place in Astana, following which Vladimir Putin, President of Kazakhstan Nursultan Nazarbayev and President of Belarus Alexander Lukashenko signed an Agreement on the Eurasian Economic Union.

== See also ==
- Eurasian economic integration
- Central Asian Union, later called the Central Asian Economic Union
- Comecon, Soviet-era economic integration plan.
- Organization for Security and Co-operation in Europe statistics
- Post-Soviet states#Regional organizations
- European integration
- Eurasianism
