= Igor Petrishenko =

Belarusian politician (born 1965)

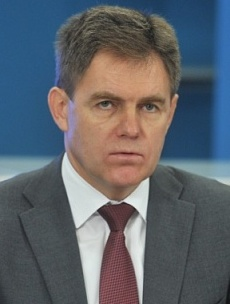
- Petrishenko in 2018

Deputy Prime Minister
- Incumbent
- Assumed office 18 August 2018
- President: Alexander Lukashenko
- Prime Minister: Roman Golovchenko
- Preceded by: Vasily Zharko

Ambassador of Belarus to Russia
- In office 10 September 2012 – 18 August 2018
- President: Alexander Lukashenko
- Prime Minister: Mikhail Myasnikovich; Andrei Kobyakov
- Preceded by: Andrei Kobyakov
- Succeeded by: Vladimir Semashko

Personal details
- Born: 19 October 1965 (age 60)

Igor Viktorovich Petrishenko (Russian: Игорь Викторович Петришенко; born 19 October 1965) is a Belarusian politician serving as deputy prime minister since 2018. From 2012 to 2018, he served as ambassador to Russia.
