= Eurasian Economic Commission =

Executive body of the Eurasian Economic Union

Eurasian Commission
Belarusian	Еўразійскай камісіі
Kazakh	Еуразиялық комиссия
Russian	Евразийской комиссии
- Status: EEU institution
- Role: Executive cabinet
- Established: 2012

College
- Current college: Myasnikovich Commission
- Chairman of the Board: Baqytzhan Saghyntaev
- Commissioners: Artak Kamalyan; Varos Simonyan; Viktor Nazarenko; Baqytzhan Saghyntaev; Arman Shakkaliyev; Temirbek Asanbekov; Maksat Mamytkanov; Sergei Glazyev; Andrei Slepnev
- Total members: 10

Council
- Members of the Council of the Commission: Mher Grigoryan; Igor Petrishenko; Baqyt Sultanov; Arzybek Kozhoshev; Aleksei Overchuk

Administration
- Working language: Russian
- Staff: 1,200
- Departments: 25
- Location: Moscow, Russia

Website
- eec.eaeunion.org

The Eurasian Economic Commission (EEC) is the executive body of the Eurasian Economic Union responsible for implementing decisions, upholding the EEU treaties and managing the day-to-day business of the Eurasian Economic Union. The main task of the Eurasian Economic Commission is to ensure the functioning and development of the EEU, and to prepare proposals for its further integration.

The Board of the commission operates as a cabinet government, with 10 members of the commission ("commissioners"). There are two members per member state. The Chairman of the commission (currently Mikhail Myasnikovich) is nominated by the heads of state of the member states of the EEU. The usual working language of the commission is Russian.

The EEC was constituted by the Treaty on the Eurasian Economic Commission, signed on November 18, 2011, and which entered into force on 1 January 2012. It began it operations on February 2, 2012. On 1 January 2015 it became the principle organ of the Eurasian Economic Union, upon entry into force of the Treaty on the Eurasian Economic Union.

== History ==
=== Establishment ===
The legal basis for the Eurasian Economic Commission is the Treaty on the Eurasian Economic Commission, which entered into force on 1 January 2012 for Belarus, Kazakhstan and Russia. The commission started its work 1 month later as an executive body for the Single Economic Space. All the powers of the Customs Union's Commission, which had been established in 2010 are delegated to the commission. With the entry into force of the Treaty on the Eurasian Economic Union, the Commission became the main executive organ of Union.

=== Enlargement ===
With the enlargement of the Eurasian Economic Union, more Board and Council Members were appointed. Both Armenia and Kyrgyzstan received one board member from the moment of their accession to the Union, as well as 3 respectively 2 Council Members. The Council members were however not assigned a specific portfolio, until the next commission is appointed in February 2016.

== Governance ==
The EEC is a two level body, consisting of:

- Council of the Eurasian Economic Commission (5 members, 1 each from all EEU member states)
- Board of the Eurasian Economic Commission (10 members, 2 each from all EEU member states)

=== The Council of the Commission ===
Office	Name
Vice Prime Minister of Armenia	Mher Grigoryan
Deputy Prime Minister of Belarus	Ihar Pyetryshenka
Minister of Trade and Integration of Kazakhstan	Serik Zhumangharin
Ministerial Cabinet Chairman of Kyrgyzstan	Adylbek Kasymaliev
Deputy Prime Minister of Russia	Alexei Overchuk

The Presidency of the Council rotates every year among the deputy prime-ministers of EEC member states. Rotation of the Presidency of the council is carried out in turn in Russian alphabetical order by name of the Party. The council's decisions are taken by consensus.

=== The Board of the Commission ===
The executive power of the EEC is held by the Board of the commission, providing development and implementation of policies for further integration. The Board of the commission is composed of 10 commissioners, 2 per member state. One of the commissioners is the chairman of the Board of the commission. The chairman of the Board of the Commission and Members of the Board of the commission are appointed for four years with a possible extension of powers by Heads of States. The decisions of the Board of the commission are made by " qualified majority voting". Each member of the Board of the commission has one vote.

Chairman of the Eurasian Economic Commission	Baqytzhan Saghyntaev	Kazakhstan
Commissioner for Industry and the Agro-Industrial Complex	Gohar Barseghyan	Armenia
Commissioner for Domestic Markets, Informatisation, and Information-Communications Technology	Varos Simonyan	Armenia
Commissioner for Technical Regulation	Valentin Tataritsky	Belarus
Commissioner for Economics and Financial Policy	Baqyt Sultanov	Kazakhstan
Commissioner for Competition and Antimonopoly Regulation	Maxim Yermalovich	Belarus
Commissioner for Energy and Infrastructure	Arzybek Kozhoshev	Kyrgyzstan
Commissioner for Customs Cooperation	Ruslan Davydov	Russia
Commissioner for Integration and Macroeconomics	Eldar Alisherov	Kyrgyzstan
Commissioner for Trade	Andrei Slepnev	Russia

=== Advisory Bodies of the Commission ===
The commission is divided into several departments, and each of which is further divided into sections.

The College of the commission has overall charge of the departments. Each department is managed by one of the Members of the Board (of Ministers) in accordance with the division of responsibilities between them.

Departments:

- Department of Integration Development
- Department of Macroeconomic Policy
- Department of Statistics
- Department of Financial Policy
- Department of Entrepreneurial Activity Development
- Department of Labor Migration and Social Protection
- Department of Industrial Policy
- Department of Agro-Industrial Policy
- Department of Customs, Tariff, and Non-Tariff Regulation
- Department of Internal Market Protection
- Department of Trade Policy
- Department of Technical Regulation and Accreditation
- Department of Sanitary, Phytosanitary, and Veterinary Measures
- Department of Customs Legislation and Law Enforcement Practice
- Department of Customs Infrastructure
- Department of Transport and Infrastructure
- Department of Energy
- Department of Antimonopoly Regulation
- Department of Competition Policy and Policy in the Field of Public Procurement
- Department of Information Technology
- Department of Internal Market Function
- Department of Protocol and Organizational Support
- Department of Finance
- Legal Department
- Department of Managerial Affairs

=== Employment ===
From January 1, 2012, the Commission include the administrative body of about 600 international civil servants. From July 1, 2012, the number of employees increased to 850 staff members and from January 1, 2013 – to 1,071. All persons employed by the commission as officials are international civil servants.

== Powers and functions ==
=== The Competences of the Eurasian Economic Commission ===
The Competences of the Eurasian Economic Commission were originally defined in the Article 3 of the Treaty on the Eurasian Economic Commission dated November 18, 2010. All the powers of the Customs Union's Commission have been delegated to the Eurasian Economic Commission. The present competences of the commission are defined in the Treaty on the Eurasian Economic Union.

The Competences of the Commission include

- customs tariff and non-tariff regulation
- customs administration
- technical regulation
- sanitary, veterinary and phytosanitary measures
- enrolment and allocation of import customs duties
- establishment of trade regimes with third countries
- statistics of external and internal trade
- macroeconomic policy
- competition policy
- industrial and agriculture subsidies
- energy policy
- natural monopolies
- state and municipal procurement
- internal trade in services and investment
- transport and transportation
- currency policy
- intellectual property and copyright
- migration policy
- financial markets (banking, insurance, foreign exchange market, stock market)

The Commission ensures the implementation of international treaties, forming the legal base of the Customs Union (CU) and Single Economic Space (SES). The commission is also the depositary of international treaties, forming the legal base of the CU and the CES as well as decisions of the Supreme Eurasian Economic Council. Within its competence, the Commission issues non-binding instruments, such as recommendations and also may take decisions that are binding on the Parties.

The budget of the commission is to be made up of contributions from member states and it is approved by the Supreme Eurasian Economic Council.

== See also ==
- Commonwealth of Independent States
- Eurasian Economic Union
- Eurasianism
- Post-Soviet states
- Trade blocs
