= List of intergovernmental organizations =

Overview of IGOs

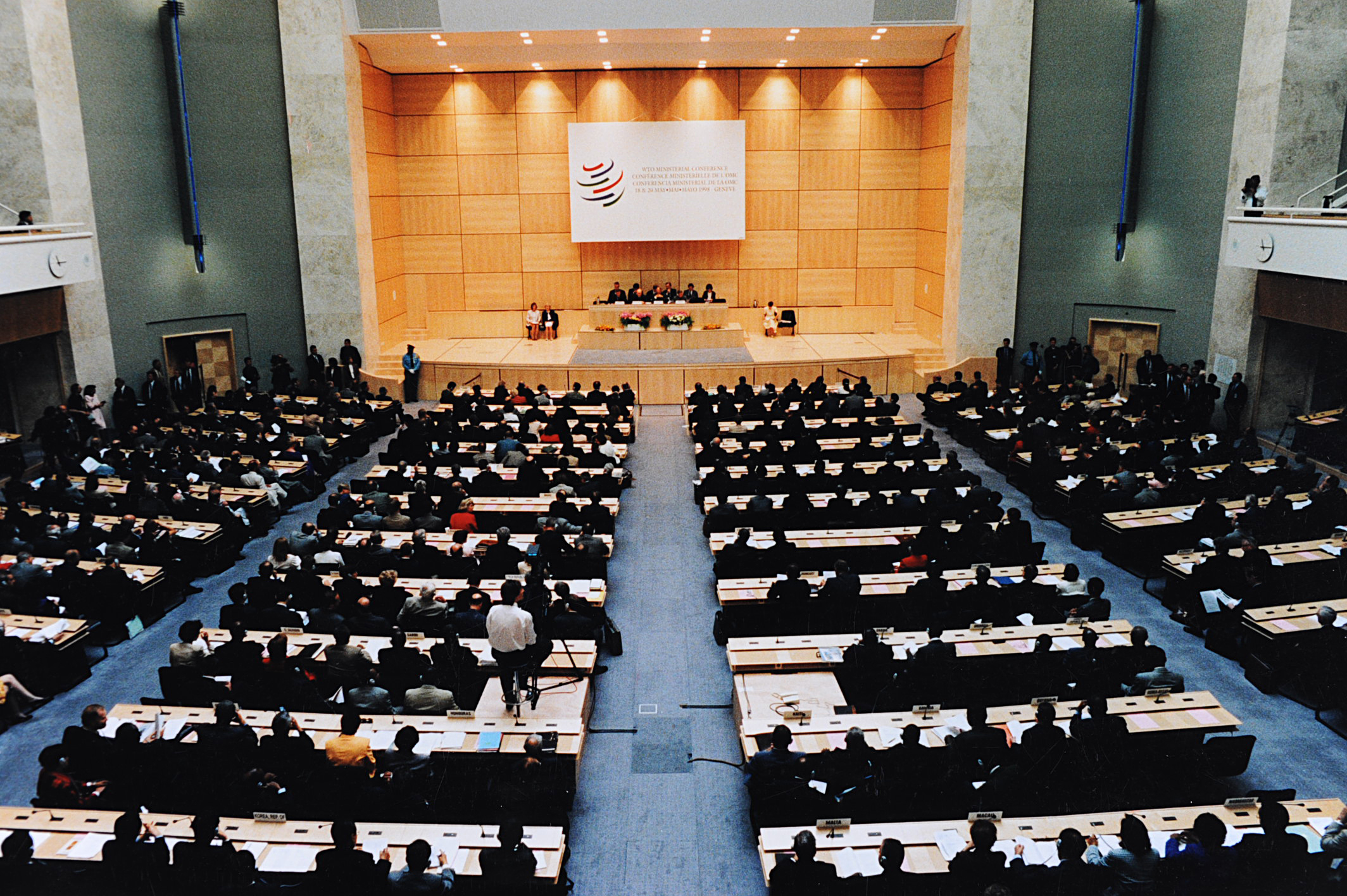
A ministerial conference of the World Trade Organization, in the Palace of Nations (Geneva, Switzerland)

The following is a list of the major existing intergovernmental organizations (IGOs).

For a more complete listing, see the Yearbook of International Organizations, which includes 25,000 international non-governmental organizations (INGOs), excluding for-profit enterprises, about 5,000 IGOs, and lists dormant and dead organizations as well as those in operation (figures as of the 400th edition, 2012/13). A 2020 academic dataset on international organizations included 561 intergovernmental organizations between 1815 and 2015; more than one-third of those IGOs ended up defunct.

== United Nations and agencies ==
The UN has six principal organs:

- The General Assembly (the main deliberative assembly);
- The Security Council (decides certain resolutions for peace and security);
- The Economic and Social Council (assists in promoting international economic and social cooperation and development);
- The Secretariat (provides studies, information, and facilities needed by the UN);
- The International Court of Justice (the primary judicial organ).
- The United Nations Trusteeship Council (inactive)

The UN also includes various Funds, Programmes and specialized agencies:

- Food and Agriculture Organization
- International Labour Organization
- International Civil Aviation Organization
- International Maritime Organization
- International Telecommunication Union
- Joint United Nations Programme on HIV/AIDS
- United Nations Capital Development Fund
- United Nations Human Rights Council (UNHRC)
- United Nations International Children's Emergency Fund (UNICEF)
- United Nations Development Programme (UNDP)
- United Nations Educational, Scientific and Cultural Organization (UNESCO)
- United Nations Environment Programme (UNEP)
- United Nations Human Settlements Programme (UN-Habitat)
- United Nations Industrial Development Organization (UNIDO)
- United Nations Office for Disaster Risk Reduction (UNISDR)
- United Nations Office on Drugs and Crime (UNODC)
- Universal Postal Union (UPU)
- World Health Organization (WHO)
- World Intellectual Property Organization (WIPO)
- World Food Programme (WFP)
- World Meteorological Organization (WMO)
- UN Tourism
- The UN maintains various offices:
  - United Nations Headquarters (New York City)
  - United Nations Office at Geneva
  - United Nations Office at Nairobi
  - United Nations Office at Vienna

The UN also includes subsidiary organs:

- International Residual Mechanism for Criminal Tribunals
  - International Criminal Tribunal for the former Yugoslavia (ICTY)
  - International Criminal Tribunal for Rwanda (ICTR)

== Agricultural research organizations ==
- Africa Rice Center (West Africa Rice Development Association, WARDA)
- Bioversity International (International Plant Genetics Resources Institute, IPGRI)
- Center for International Forestry Research (CIFOR)
- International Center for Tropical Agriculture (ICTA)
- International Center for Agricultural Research in the Dry Areas (ICARDA)
- International Crops Research Institute for the Semi-Arid Tropics (ICRISAT)
- International Food Policy Research Institute (IFPRI)
- International Institute of Tropical Agriculture (IITA)
- International Livestock Research Institute (ILRI)
- International Maize and Wheat Improvement Center (CIMMYT)
- International Potato Center (IPC)
- International Rice Research Institute (IRRI)
- International Water Management Institute (IWMI)
- World Agroforestry Centre (International Centre for Research in Agroforestry, ICRAF)
- WorldFish Center (International Center for Living Aquatic Resources Management, ICLARM)
- World Vegetable Center
- CGIAR
- CAB International (Centre for Agriculture and Bioscience International, CABI)

== Fisheries organizations ==
- Asia-Pacific Fishery Commission (APFIC)
- Commission for the Conservation of Antarctic Marine Living Resources (CCAMLR)
- Great Lakes Fishery Commission (GLFC)
- Indian Ocean Tuna Commission (IOTC)
- Inter-American Tropical Tuna Commission (IATTC)
- International Commission for the Conservation of Atlantic Tunas (ICCAT)
- International Pacific Halibut Commission (IPHC)
- International Whaling Commission (IWC)
- North-East Atlantic Fisheries Commission (NEAFC)
- Northwest Atlantic Fisheries Organization (NAFO)
- North Atlantic Salmon Conservation Organization (NASCO)
- Pacific Salmon Commission (PSC)
- Southeast Asian Fisheries Development Center (SEAFDEC)
- Western and Central Pacific Fisheries Commission (WCPFC)

== Maritime organizations ==
- Antarctic Treaty Secretariat (ATS)
- International Hydrographic Organization
- International Maritime Organization
- International Seabed Authority
- International Council for the Exploration of the Sea (ICES)
- Mediterranean Science Commission (CIESM)
- North Pacific Marine Science Organization (PICES)

== Financial, trade, and customs organizations ==
- Alliance for Financial Inclusion (AFI)
- African Development Bank
- Asian Development Bank
- Asian Infrastructure Investment Bank
- Bank for International Settlements
- Black Sea Trade and Development Bank (BSTDB)
- Caribbean Development Bank (CDB)
- Council of Europe Development Bank (CEB)
- Eurasian Development Bank
- European Bank for Reconstruction and Development (EBRD)
- European Investment Bank (EIB)
- Federation of Euro-Asian Stock Exchanges
- Financial Action Task Force (FATF)
- Inter-American Development Bank
- Inter-American Investment Corporation (IDB Invest)
- International Bureau of Weights and Measures (BIPM)
- International Committee on Finance (ICF)
- International Energy Agency (IEA)
- International Fund for Agricultural Development (IFAD)
- International Development Law Organization (IDLO), headquartered in Rome
- International Monetary Fund (IMF)
- Islamic Development Bank (IDB)
- Nordic Development Fund (NDF)
- Nordic Investment Bank (NIB)
- New Development Bank (NDB)
- Organization for Economic and Co-operation Development (OECD)
- OPEC Fund for International Development (OPEC Fund)
- Organization of Petroleum-Exporting Countries (OPEC)
- West African Development Bank (BOAD)
- World Bank Group
  - International Bank for Reconstruction and Development (IBRD)
  - International Development Association (IDA)
  - International Finance Corporation (IFC)
  - Multilateral Investment Guarantee Agency (MIGA)
  - International Centre for Settlement of Investment Disputes (ICSID)
- World Customs Organization (WCO)
- World Trade Organization (WTO)

== Regional organizations ==
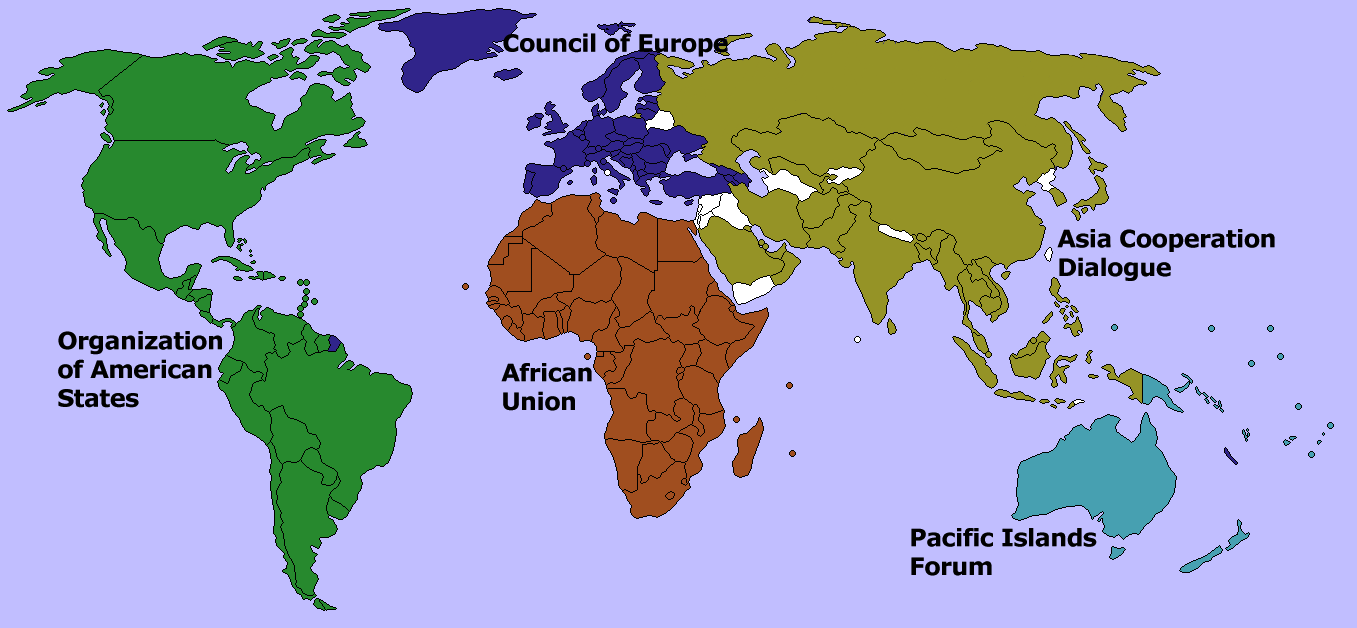
Organisations grouping almost all the countries in their respective continents. Note that Cuba is a suspended member of the Organization of American States (OAS).

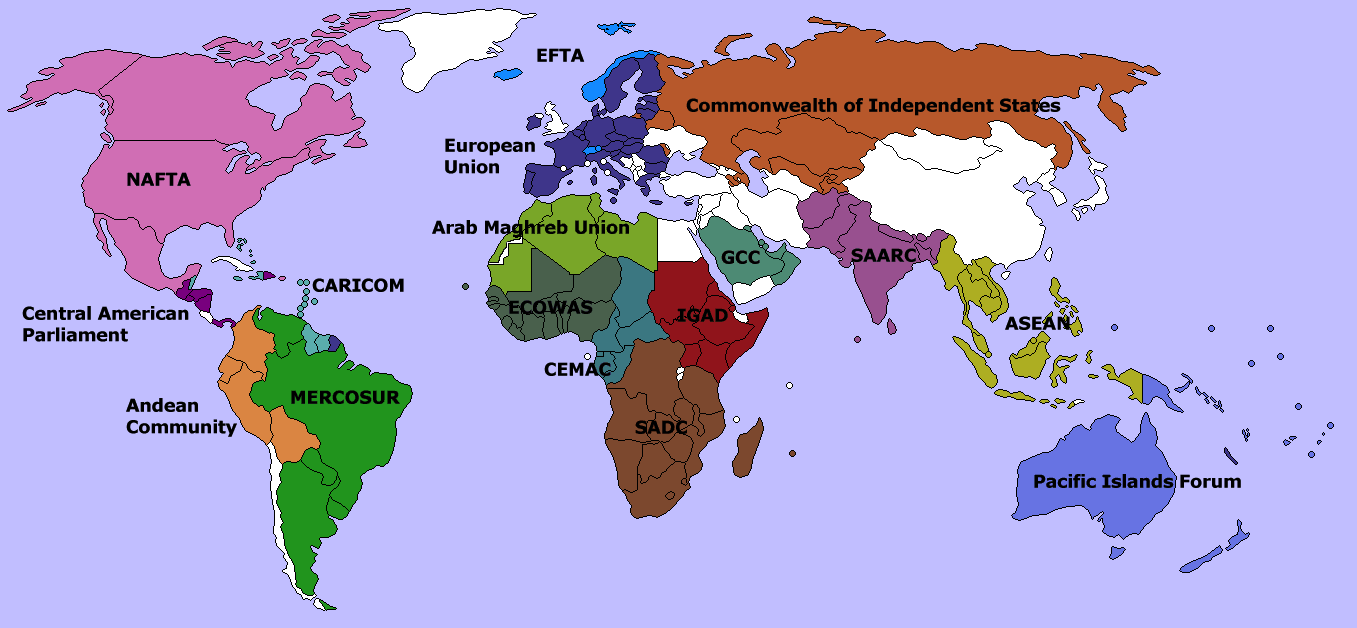
Several smaller regional organizations with non-overlapping memberships

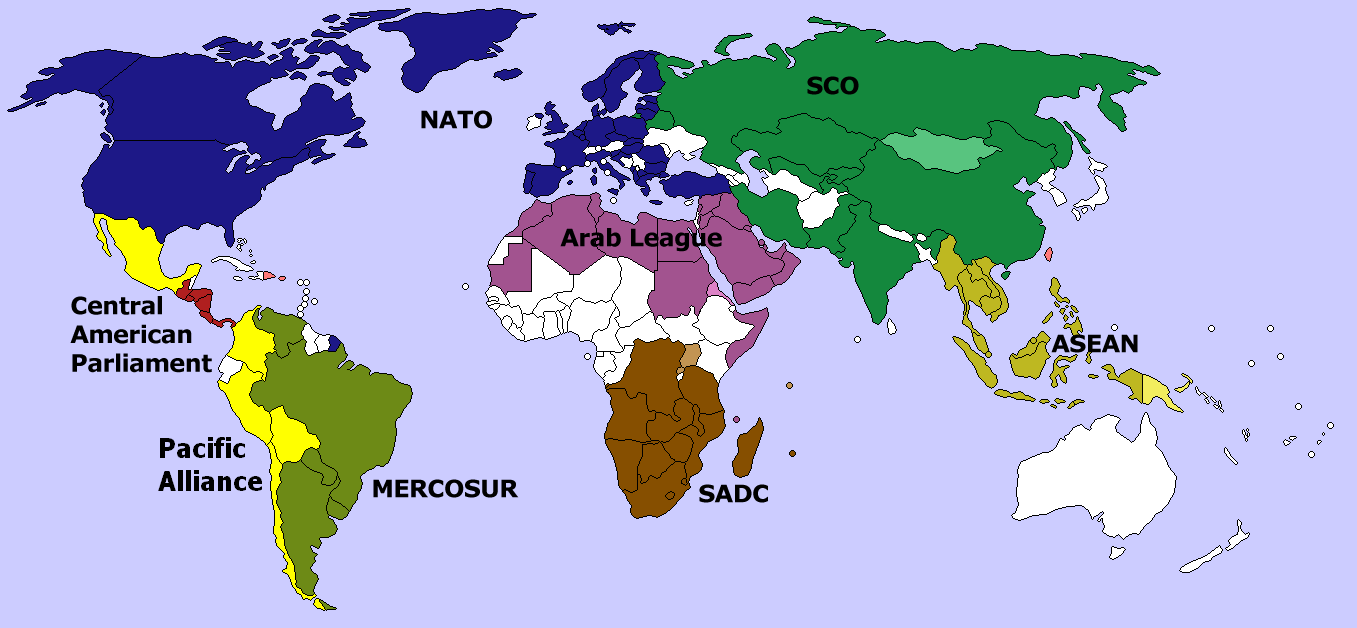
Several non-overlapping large alliances. Softer colors indicate observer/associate or candidate countries.

=== Europe ===
- European Union (EU)
  - Institutions of the European Union
  - Western European Union (defunct)
- Big Four (Western Europe)
- Council of Europe (CoE)
- Central European Initiative (CEI)
- Eastern Partnership
- Energy Community
- European Defence Agency (EDA)
- European Free Trade Association (EFTA)
- European Organisation for the Exploitation of Meteorological Satellites (EUMETSAT)
- European Patent Organisation (EPO)
- European Political Community (EPC)
  - European Coalition Against Drugs (ECAD)
- European Organisation for the Safety of Air Navigation (EUROCONTROL)
- European Telecommunications Satellite Organization (EUTELSAT IGO)
- Group of 9 (G9)
- International Commission on Civil Status (ICCS)
- Central Commission for Navigation on the Rhine (CCNR)
- Council of the Baltic Sea States (CBSS)
- Assembly of European Regions (AER)
- Eiroforum (Europe Intergovernmental Research Organizations)
  - European Organization for Nuclear Research (CERN)
  - Danube Commission
  - EUROfusion
  - European Molecular Biology Laboratory (EMBL)
  - European Space Agency (ESA)
  - European Southern Observatory (ESO)
  - European Synchrotron Radiation Facility (ESRF)
  - European x-ray free electron laser (European XFEL)
  - Institut Laue–Langevin (ILL)
- Baltic Marine Environment Protection Commission
- Benelux
- Belgium–Luxembourg Economic Union
- British–Irish Council
- Craiova Group (C4)
- Nordic-Baltic Eight
- Nordic Council
- Nordic Investment Bank
- North South Ministerial Council (Ireland)
- Northern Dimension Partnership in Public Health and Social Well-being (NDPHS)
- Organisation for Joint Armament Cooperation (OCCAR)
- Visegrád Group (V4)
- EUREKA
- European Cooperation in Science and Technology (COST)
- Community for Democracy and Rights of Nations (Commonwealth of Unrecognized States)
- European Centre for Medium-range Weather Forecasts (ECMWF)
- South-East European Cooperation Process
- West Nordic Council
- Three Seas Initiative

=== Asia ===
- Asia Cooperation Dialogue (ACD)
- Asian Development Bank (ADB)
- Asia-Pacific Economic Cooperation (APEC)
- East Asia Summit (EAS)
- Association of Southeast Asian Nations (ASEAN)
- Bay of Bengal Initiative for Multi-Sectoral Technical and Economic Cooperation (BIMSTEC)
- International Network for Bamboo and Rattan (INBAR)
- Mekong–Ganga Cooperation (MGC)
- Mekong River Commission (MRC)
- Partnerships in Environmental Management for the Seas of East Asia (PEMSEA)
- South Asian Association for Regional Cooperation (SAARC)
- Southeast Asian Ministers of Education Organization (SEAMEO)
- Trilateral Cooperation Secretariat (TCS)
- Gulf Cooperation Council (GCC)

=== Transcontinental ===
- Group of Seven
- Eurasia
  - Asia-Europe Foundation (ASEF)
  - Central Asian Cooperation Organization
  - Community for Democracy and Rights of Nations
  - Collective Security Treaty Organization (CSTO)
  - Conference on Interaction and Confidence Building Measures in Asia (CICA)
  - Conference of the New Emerging Forces (CONEFO)
  - Commonwealth of Independent States (CIS)
  - Economic Cooperation Organization (ECO)
  - Eurasian Economic Union (EEU or EAEU)
  - GUAM Organization for Democracy and Economic Development
  - Organization of the Black Sea Economic Cooperation (BSEC)
  - Organization of Turkic States (OTS)
  - Shanghai Cooperation Organisation (SCO)
  - TRACECA
  - Union State
- Trans-Atlantic
  - Group of Seven
  - Group of Ten (economics)
  - North Atlantic Treaty Organization (NATO)
  - Organization for Security and Co-operation in Europe (OSCE)
  - South Atlantic Peace and Cooperation Zone (ZPCAS)
- Mediterranean
  - Union for the Mediterranean
- Indian Ocean
  - Indian Ocean Rim Association for Regional Cooperation (IOR-ARC)
  - Indian Ocean Commission (COI)
- Arctic Ocean
  - Arctic Council
- Pacific Ocean:
  - ANZUS
  - Asia-Pacific Economic Cooperation (APEC)
  - Colombo Plan
  - Group of Five
  - Polynesian Leaders Group (PlG)
  - Melanesian Spearhead Group (MSG)
  - Pacific Islands Forum
  - Pacific Islands Forum Fisheries Agency (PIFFA)
  - Pacific Regional Environment Programme (SPREP)
  - Secretariat of the Pacific Community
- African, Caribbean and Pacific Group of States
  - Technical Centre for Agricultural and Rural Cooperation ACP-EU (CTA)
- Afro-Asian organizations
  - Asian-African Legal Consultative Organization
  - D-8 Organization for Economic Cooperation

=== Africa ===
- African Organisation for Standardisation (ARSO)
- African Union
- Economic Community of Central African States (ECCAS)
- Conseil de l'Entente
- Economic Community of West African States (ECOWAS)
- East African Community (EAC)
- West African Economic and Monetary Union (UEMOA)
- Southern African Development Community (SADC)
- Intergovernmental Authority on Development (IGAD)
- Arab Maghreb Union
- International Conference on the Great Lakes Region (ICGLR)
- African Ministers Council on Water (AMCOW)

=== Americas ===
- Organization of American States (OAS)
- Union of South American Nations (USAN)

- Mercosur
- Andean Community of Nations

- Forum for the Progress and Integration of South America (PROSUR)
- Caribbean Community (CARICOM)
- Association of Caribbean States (ACS)
- Organisation of Eastern Caribbean States (OECS)
- Central American Parliament
- Bolivarian Alliance for the Americas (ALBA)
- Rio Group
- System of Cooperation Among the American Air Forces (SICOFAA)
- Central American Bank for Economic Integration (CABEI)
- Central American Integration System
- Community of Latin American and Caribbean States (CELAC)
- Pacific Alliance

== Military alliances ==
- Australia, New Zealand, United States Security Treaty (ANZUS)
- AUKUS
- Collective Security Treaty Organization (CSTO)
- North Atlantic Treaty Organization (NATO)
- Inter-American Treaty of Reciprocal Assistance (Rio Pact)
- Islamic Military Counter Terrorism Coalition (IMCTC)

== Cultural, ethnic, linguistic, and religious organizations ==
- Commonwealth of Nations
- International Association for Religious Freedom
- International Centre for the Study of the Preservation and Restoration of Cultural Property (ICCROM)
- Organisation internationale de la Francophonie
- Community of Portuguese Language Countries (CPLP)
- Organization of Ibero-American States (OEI)
- Arab League
- Organisation of Islamic Cooperation
- International Dialogue Centre - KAICIID
- International Organization of Turkic Culture (TÜRKSOY)
- Interparliamentary Assembly on Orthodoxy
- Religions for Peace

== Educational organizations and universities ==
- Academy of European Law (ERA)
- Asian Institute of Technology (AIT)
- Cerlalc
- Commonwealth of Learning (COL)
- EUCLID (university)
- European Schools
- European University Institute
- IHE Delft Institute for Water Education
- International Bureau of Education IBE, now a part of UNESCO
- International Institute for the Unification of Private Law
- United Nations University (UNU)
- University for Peace (UPEACE)
- World Maritime University (WMU/IMO)
- International Federation of Library Associations and Institutions (IFLA)
- International Publishers Association(IPA)

== Law enforcement cooperation ==
- International Criminal Court (ICC)
- International Criminal Police Organization (Interpol)
- Permanent Court of Arbitration (PCA)
- United Nations Police (UNPOL)

== Transport ==
- Intergovernmental Organisation for International Carriage by Rail (OTIF)
- Organization for Cooperation of Railways (OSJD or OSShD)
- International Union of Railways（UIC）
- International Civil Aviation Organization
- TRACECA
- Southeast Europe Transport Community
- International Transport Forum (ITF)

== Humanitarian organizations ==
- International Cospas-Sarsat Programme
- International Committee on Finance (ICF)

== Environmental organizations ==
- Agreement on the Conservation of Albatrosses and Petrels (ACAP)
- Commission of Small Island States on Climate Change and International Law (COSIS)
- The Forum of Ministers of Environment of Latin America and the Caribbean
- Global Biodiversity Information Facility (GBIF)
- Global Environment Facility (GEF)
- Global Green Growth Institute (GGGI)
- Green Climate Fund (GCF)
- Intergovernmental Panel on Climate Change (IPCC)
- The International Union for Conservation of Nature (IUCN)
- Partnerships in Environmental Management for the Seas of East Asia (PEMSEA)
- UN Alliance for Sustainable Development Goals (UNASDG)
- United Nations Environment Programme (UNEP)

== Arms control ==
- Conference on Disarmament
- Organisation for the Prohibition of Chemical Weapons (OPCW)
- Preparatory Commission for the Comprehensive Nuclear-Test-Ban Treaty Organization (CTBTO)
- Wassenaar Arrangement
- Nuclear Suppliers Group (NSG)
- Australia Group (AG)
- Missile Technology Control Regime (MTCR)

== Energy organizations ==
=== Multi sector organizations ===
- International Energy Agency
- Energy Charter
- Energy Community
- United Nations Industrial Development Organization (UNIDO)
- International Institute for Applied Systems Analysis (IIASA)
- International Energy Forum (IEF)

=== Nuclear power organizations ===
- European Atomic Energy Community
- International Atomic Energy Agency
- International Centre for Synchrotron-Light for Experimental Science Applications in the Middle East
- Korean Peninsula Energy Development Organization
- Nuclear Energy Agency
- United Nations Atomic Energy Commission
- World Association of Nuclear Operators

=== Sustainable energy organizations ===
- International Renewable Energy Agency (IRENA)
- Sustainable Energy for All (SE4ALL)
- Renewable Energy and Energy Efficiency Partnership (REEEP)
- International Solar Alliance

== Digital organizations ==
- Packet Clearing House (PCH)
- Digital 9 (D9)

== Ideological and political groupings ==
- Quadrilateral Security Dialogue (QUAD)
- Non-Aligned Movement
- Group of 4 (G4)
- Group of Seven (G7)
- Group of Eleven (G11) (defunct)
- Group of Twelve (G12) (defunct)
- Group of 15 (G-15)
- Group of 77 (G77)
- Group of 24 (G24)
- G20
- Alliance of Small Island States (AOSIS)
- BRICS (Brazil, Russia, India, China, South Africa)
- Bolivarian Alliance for the Americas (ALBA)
- Association of World Election Bodies (AWEB)
- New Agenda Coalition
- Non-Proliferation and Disarmament Initiative
- Western European and Others Group

(disbanded)

== Other ==
- International Commission on Missing Persons
- Advisory Centre on World Trade Organization Law
- International Centre for Genetic Engineering and Biotechnology
- International Institute for Democracy and Electoral Assistance (International IDEA)
- Partners in Population and Development
- South Centre
- SKA Observatory (SKAO)
- World Organisation for Animal Health
- Forum for India-Pacific Islands cooperation (FIPIC)
- U-Report
- International Center for Promotion of Enterprises (ICPE)
- International Council on Social Welfare

== International organization membership by country ==
- List of European countries by membership in international organisations
- International organisations in Africa
- International organization membership of Algeria
- International organization membership of Andorra
- International organization membership of Austria
- International organisation membership of Canada
- International organization membership of China
- International organization membership of Haiti
- International organization membership of Honduras
- International organization membership of Hong Kong
- International organization membership of Hungary
- International organization membership of Iceland
- International organization membership of Indonesia
- International organization membership of Iran
- International organization membership of Iraq
- International organization membership of Israel
- International organization membership of Kosovo
- International organization membership of the Netherlands
- International organization membership of the Philippines
- International organization membership of Syria
- International organization membership of Thailand
- Turkey's membership of international organizations
- International organization membership of Uganda
- International membership of Ukraine
- International organization membership of the United States
- International organization membership of Uzbekistan
- International organization membership of Vatican City
- International organization membership of Yemen
- International organization membership of Zambia
- International organization membership of Zimbabwe

== Defunct ==
- Allied Control Council
- Arab Cooperation Council
- Central Treaty Organization
- Comecon
- Council of Ambassadors
- Customs and Economic Union of Central Africa
- Delian League
- Eurasian Economic Community (transformed into Eurasian Economic Union)
- French Community
- French Union
- G33
- International Authority for the Ruhr
- International Trade Organization
- Latin League
- Latin Union
- League of Corinth
- League of Nations
- Peloponnesian League
- Organisation of African Unity
- Southeast Asia Treaty Organization
- Union of African States

== See also ==
- List of local government organizations
- List of international sports federations
