= List of supranational environmental agencies =

A variety of supranational environmental agencies, commissions, programs, and secretariats exist across the world today. Some are global in nature, while others are regional; they may be multilateral or bilateral in character. Some are responsible for broad areas of environmental policy, regulation, and implementation; others focus on very specific issue areas. This article lists notable supranational environmental agencies, by region.

== Global ==
=== United Nations ===
- Food and Agriculture Organization
- Global Environment Facility
- United Nations Convention on the Law of the Sea
  - International Seabed Authority
  - International Tribunal for the Law of the Sea
- United Nations Convention to Combat Desertification Secretariat
- United Nations Environment Programme
- United Nations Framework Convention on Climate Change Secretariat
- World Meteorological Organization

=== Other ===
- Alliance of Small Island States
- Global Biodiversity Information Facility
- Intergovernmental Panel on Climate Change
- Intergovernmental Science-Policy Platform on Biodiversity and Ecosystem Services
- International Carbon Action Partnership
- International Tropical Timber Organization
- International Union for Conservation of Nature
- International Whaling Commission
- North Atlantic Marine Mammal Commission
- OECD Environment Directorate
- World Nature Organization

== Africa ==
- Central African Forest Commission
- Congo Basin Forest Partnership
- Egyptian Environmental Affairs Authority (EEAA)

== Americas and Caribbean ==
- Comissão de Integração Nacional, Desenvolvimento Regional e da Amazônia - CINDRA, Brazil
- Commission for Environmental Cooperation, operating under the North American Free Trade Agreement
- The Forum of Ministers of Environment of Latin America and the Caribbean, part of UNEP's Regional office in Latin America and the Caribbean
- International Joint Commission, prevents and resolves disputes about the use and quality of boundary waters on the Canada–US border.

== Antarctica ==
- Antarctic Treaty Secretariat

== Asia ==
- ASEAN Wildlife Enforcement Network
- International Network for Bamboo and Rattan (INBAR)
- Mekong River Commission
- Partnerships in Environmental Management for the Seas of East Asia (PEMSEA)

== Europe ==
=== European Union ===
- European Commission
  - Directorate-General for Climate Action
  - Directorate-General for Energy
  - Directorate-General for the Environment
  - Directorate-General for Maritime Affairs and Fisheries
- European Environment Agency

=== Other ===
- Baltic Marine Environment Protection Commission (HELCOM)
- European Forest Institute
- European Space Agency (ESA)
- International Council for the Exploration of the Sea (ICES)
- International Commission for the Protection of the Danube River
- Mediterranean Science Commission (CIESM)
- Regional Environmental Center for Central and Eastern Europe

== Oceania ==
- Pacific Islands Forum Fisheries Agency
- Pacific Regional Environment Programme

== See also ==
- List of agriculture ministries
- List of environmental ministries
- List of environmental organizations
- List of forestry ministries
- List of intergovernmental organizations
- List of international environmental agreements
- Supranational union
