= International organization membership of Uzbekistan =

== Future membership ==
Uzbekistan is applying for a membership in the following international organizations:

- World Trade Organization (WTO) - applied on 8 December 1994

== Current membership ==
Uzbekistan is a member of the following international organizations and partnerships:

- Asia Cooperation Dialogue (ACD) - from 2006
- Central Asia Regional Economic Cooperation Program (CAREC)
- Commonwealth of Independent States (CIS) - from 4 January 1992
- Conference on Interaction & Confidence Measures Building in Asia (CICA)
- Economic Cooperation Organization (ECO)
- Euro-Atlantic Partnership Council (EAPC)
- International Organization of Turkic Culture (TÜRKSOY)
- Organization for Security and Cooperation in Europe (OSCE)
- Organisation of Islamic Cooperation (OIC)
- Organization of Turkic States (OTS)
- Partnership for Peace (PfP) - from 13 July 1994
- Prague Process
- Shanghai Cooperation Organisation (SCO)
- The World Road Association (PIARC)
- United Nations (UN) - from 2 March 1992
- World Bank (WB)

Uzbekistan is also a member or a partner of the following UN institutions and specialized agencies:

- Comprehensive Nuclear-Test-Ban Treaty Organization Preparatory Commission (CTBTO) - from 2 October 1996
- Food and Agriculture Organization of the United Nations (FAO)
- Global Alliance of National Human Rights Institutions (GANHRI)
- International Atomic Energy Agency (IAEA) - from 1994
- International Civil Aviation Organization (ICAO)
- International Fund for Agricultural Development (IFAD) - from 19 February 2011
- International Labour Organization (ILO)
- International Organization for Migration (IOM)
- International Telecommunication Union (ITU)
- Joint United Nations Programme on HIV/AIDS (UNAIDS)
- Organisation for the Prohibition of Chemical Weapons (OPCW) - signature 24 November 1995, ratification 23 July 1996, entry into force 29 April 1997
- United Nations Children's Fund (UNICEF)
- United Nations Development Programme (UNDP)
- United Nations Economic and Social Commission for Asia and the Pacific (ESCAP)
- United Nations Economic Commission for Europe (UNECE) - from 30 July 1993
- United Nations Educational, Scientific and Cultural Organization (UNESCO)
- United Nations High Commissioner for Refugees (UNHCR)
- United Nations Human Rights Council (HRC)
- United Nations Industrial Development Organization (UNIDO)
- United Nations Special Programme for the Economies of Central Asia (SPECA)
- Universal Postal Union (UPU)
- World Bank Group (WBG)
- World Health Organization (WHO)
- World Intellectual Property Organization (WIPO)
- World Meteorological Organization (WMO)
- World Tourism Organization (UNWTO)

Uzbekistan is a member of the following Bretton Woods institutions:

- International Monetary Fund (IMF)
- International Bank for Reconstruction and Development (IBRD) - from 21 September 1992
- International Centre for Settlement of Investment Disputes (ICSID) - from 25 August 1995
- International Development Association (IDA) - from 24 September 1992
- International Finance Corporation (IFC) - from 30 September 1993
- Multilateral Investment Guarantee Agency (MIGA) - from 4 November 1993

Uzbekistan is a member of the following regional development banks:

- Asian Development Bank (ADB)
- Asian Infrastructure Investment Bank (AIIB) - from 30 November 2016
- European Bank for Reconstruction and Development (EBRD) - from 30 April 1992
- Islamic Development Bank (IsDB)

Uzbekistan is a partner of the following informal group:

- Global South

== Former membership ==
Uzbekistan was earlier a membership of the following international organizations:

- Central Asian Cooperation Organization (CACO) - from 2002 to 2005 (merged with EURASEC)
- Central Asian Economic Community (CAEC) - from 1998 to 2002 (renamed to CACO)
- Central Asian Economic Union (CAEU) - from 1994 to 1998 (renamed to CAEC)
- Collective Security Treaty Organization (CSTO) - from 2006 to 28 June 2012
- Eurasian Economic Community (EURASEC) - from 7 October 2005 to 16 October 2008
- GUAM Organization for Democracy and Economic Development (GUAM) - from 1997 to 2005
