= International organization membership of China =

This is a comprehensive list of international organizations in which China officially participates.

Since 1971, this polity known as the People's Republic of China (PRC) became widely recognized as the sole legitimate government of "China" replacing the Republic of China (ROC) on Taiwan in the global stage and the PRC, per the One China principle, denies the legitimacy of the ROC, which currently has official diplomatic relations with 11 UN member states and Holy See, while over 60 countries, most have diplomatic relations with the PRC, maintain unofficial relations.

== Memberships ==
=== Membership in UN system organizations ===
- UN General Assembly and Security Council
- Food and Agriculture Organization of the UN
- UN Conference on Trade and Development
- UN Educational, Scientific and Cultural Organization
- UN High Commissioner for Refugees
- UN Industrial Development Organization
- UN Institute for Training and Research
- UN Monitoring, Verification, and Inspection Commission
- UN Truce Supervision Organization

=== Other memberships ===
- African Development Bank
- Arctic Council (observer)
- Asian Development Bank
- Asia Pacific Economic Cooperation
- Asia-Pacific Space Cooperation Organization
- Association of Caribbean States (observer)
- Association of Southeast Asian Nations (dialogue partner)
- Association of Southeast Asian Nations Regional Forum
- Bank for International Settlements
- BRICS
- Caribbean Development Bank
- Commission on Science and Technology for Sustainable Development in the South
- Conference on Interaction and Confidence-Building Measures in Asia
- FIFA
- Forum Macao
- Group of 20
- Group of 77
- Indian Ocean Rim Association (dialogue partner)
- International Atomic Energy Agency
- International Bank for Reconstruction and Development
- International Chamber of Commerce
- International Civil Aviation Organization
- International Criminal Police Organization
- International Development Association
- International Federation of Red Cross and Red Crescent Societies
- International Finance Corporation
- International Fund for Agricultural Development
- International Hydrographic Organization
- International Ice Hockey Federation
- International Labour Organization
- International Maritime Organization
- International Monetary Fund
- International Olympic Committee
- International Organization for Mediation
- International Organization for Migration (observer)
- International Organization for Standardization
- International Potato Center
- International Red Cross and Red Crescent Movement
- International Telecommunication Union
- Latin American Integration Association (observer)
- Like-Minded Megadiverse Countries
- Non-Aligned Movement (observer)
- Organisation for the Prohibition of Chemical Weapons
- Permanent Court of Arbitration
- Shanghai Cooperation Organisation
- South Asian Association for Regional Cooperation (SAARC) (observer)
- Universal Postal Union
- World Artificial Intelligence Cooperation Organization
- World Customs Organization
- World Health Organization
- World Intellectual Property Organization
- World Meteorological Organization
- World Tourism Organization
- World Trade Organization
- Zangger Committee
