= International organization membership of Ukraine =

Organizations with ukraine as a member

This article lists international organizations of which Ukraine is a member or an observer.

Name of the organization		Ukraine's accession	Status	Sources
United Nations		October 24, 1945
United Nations Economic Commission for Europe		March 28, 1947
World Trade Organization		May 16, 2008
European Bank for Reconstruction and Development		April 13, 1992
International Monetary Fund		September 3, 1992
World; Bank; Group	International Bank for Reconstruction and Development	September 3, 1992
World; Bank; Group	International Finance Corporation	1993
World; Bank; Group	Multilateral Investment Guarantee Agency	1994
World; Bank; Group	International Centre for Settlement of Investment Disputes	July 7, 2000
World; Bank; Group	International Development Association	May 27, 2004
Organization for Security and Co-operation in Europe		January 1, 1995
NATO Partnership for Peace		February 8, 1994
Euro-Atlantic Partnership Council		May 29, 1997
Council of Europe		November 9, 1995
Energy Community		February 1, 2011	member
Baku Initiative		November 13, 2004
Central European Initiative		May 31, 1996
Commonwealth of Independent States		December 8, 1991
GUAM Organization for Democracy and Economic Development		October 10, 1997
Black Sea Trade and Development Bank		1998
Organization of the Black Sea Economic Cooperation		May 1, 1999
Black Sea Naval Co-operation Task Group		April 2, 2001
Common Economic Space		September 19, 2003
Community of Democratic Choice		December 2, 2005
Black Sea Forum for Partnership and Dialogue		June 5, 2006
Organization of Central Asian Cooperation			observer
Eurasian Economic Community		May 2002	observer
Stability Pact for South Eastern Europe			observer
Southeast European Cooperative Initiative			observer
Council of the Baltic Sea States			observer
Francophonie		September 29, 2006	observer
Non-Aligned Movement			observer

== Possible membership ==
Ukraine is also a potential candidate for the following organizations:

- CEFTA (Central European Free Trade Agreement)

see: Ukraine, Croatia broaden ties

- European Union

see: Accession of Ukraine to the European Union, European Union Association Agreement, Stabilisation and Association Process, European Neighbourhood Policy, Eastern Partnership, Ukraine–European Union relations, Future enlargement of the European Union

- NATO.

see: Ukraine–NATO relations, Enlargement of NATO, Partnership for Peace, Lithuanian–Polish–Ukrainian Brigade
