= Caco =

Caco or CACO may refer to:

- Central Asian Cooperation Organization
- Cacos (military group), groups of Haitian armed individuals in the 19th and 20th century
- Caco-2 cell line
- Casualty Assistance Calls Officer, in Casualty notification
- Qaqun, a Palestinian Arab village depopulated in 1948
- Caco, a common nickname for the Portuguese given name Carlos
- Caco is the nickname of Mušan Topalović, Bosnian war commander
