= Regional organization =

International organizations that act within a specific region

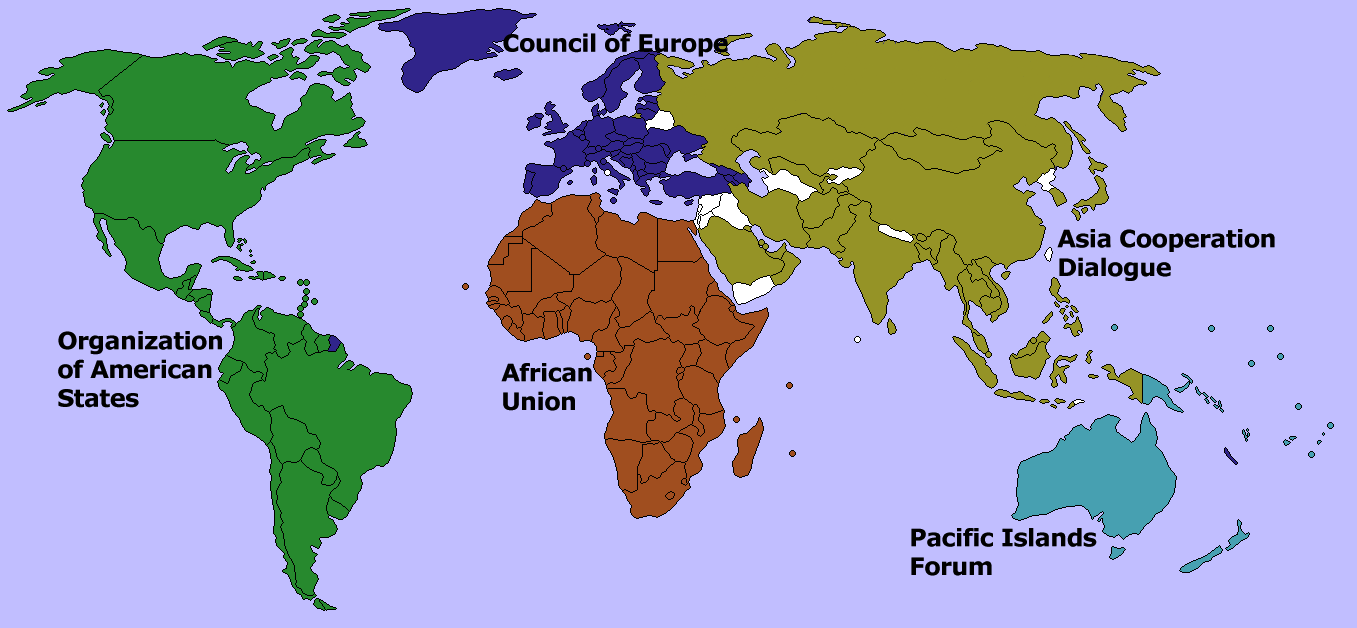
Organizations grouping almost all the countries in their respective continents. Note that Turkey is a member of both the Council of Europe (CoE) and the Asia Cooperation Dialogue (ACD). See also: international organization.

Several smaller regional organizations with non-overlapping memberships.

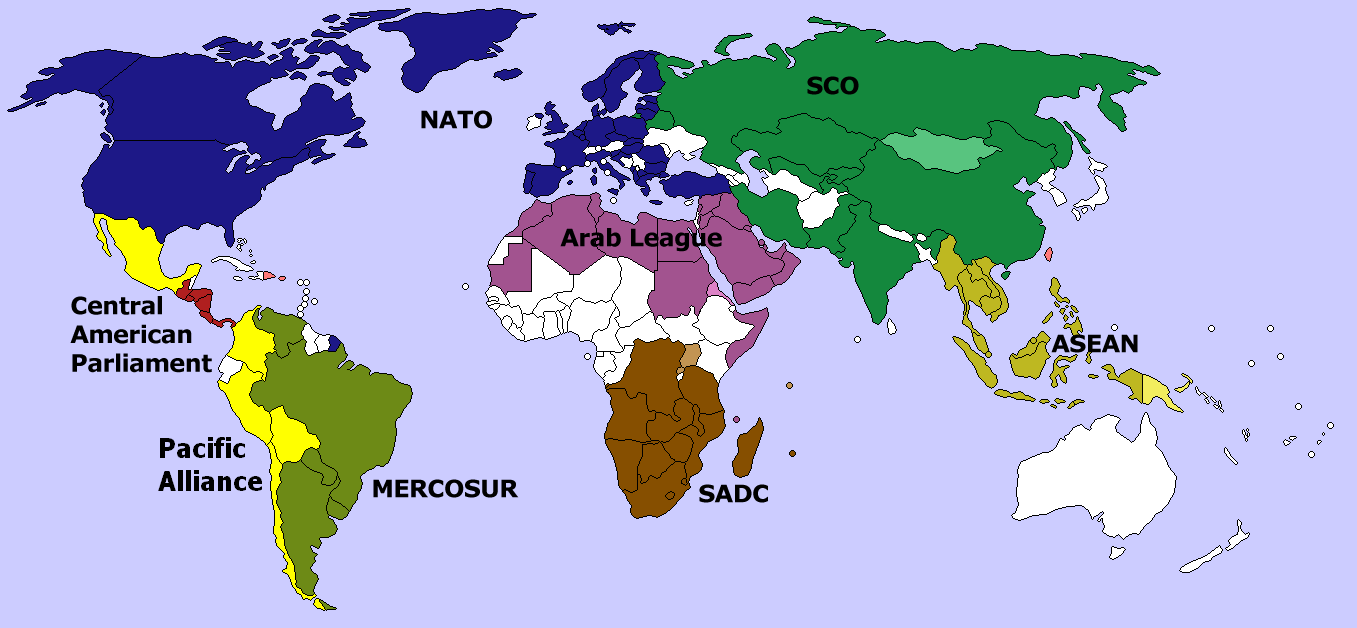
Several non-overlapping large alliances. Pastel colors indicate observer/associate or candidate countries.

Regional organizations (ROs) are international organizations (IOs) whose membership is limited to states within a single geographic region. They have been established to foster cooperation and political and economic integration or dialogue among states within a region. They vary from loose cooperation arrangements to formal regional integration. Since their formal emergence after the end of World War II, they have become increasingly numerous and influential, often working closely with other multilateral organizations such as the United Nations.

Examples of ROs include, amongst others, the African Union (AU), Association of Southeast Asian Nations (ASEAN), Arab League (AL), Arab Maghreb Union (AMU), Caribbean Community (CARICOM), Council of Europe (CoE), Eurasian Economic Union (EAEU), European Political Community (EPC), European Union (EU), South Asian Association for Regional Cooperation (SAARC), Shanghai Cooperation Organisation, Asian-African Legal Consultative Organization (AALCO), Union for the Mediterranean (UfM), and the Union of South American Nations (USAN).

== See also ==
- International organization
- List of intergovernmental organizations
- List of regional organizations by population
- List of trade blocs
- Regional Economic Communities
- Regional integration
- Supranational union
