= CAEC =

CAEC may refer to:

- Cuerpo de Aviación del Ejército de Cuba early name for Cuban Air Force, formed in 5 July 1913 and reorganized in 1934.
- Casimiro de Abreu Esporte Clube
- Central Asian Economic Cooperation, an organization later renamed to Organization of Central Asian Cooperation
- Council for Asia-Europe Cooperation
- Catholic Adult Education Centre, based in Sydney, Australia
- One of the County Agricultural Executive Committees, in the United Kingdom
