= List of international presidential trips made by Mohammad Abdul Hamid =

The following is a list of international presidential trips made by Mohammad Abdul Hamid while he served as the president of Bangladesh.

== List of visits ==
Country	Areas visited	Date(s)	Purpose(s)	Ref.
India	New Delhi	18–23 December 2014		
Tajikistan	Dushanbe	13–15 June 2019	To attend 5th Summit of Conference on Interaction and Confidence-Building Measures in Asia (CICA).	
Uzbekistan	Bukhara	16 June 2019		
