= Partners in Population and Development =

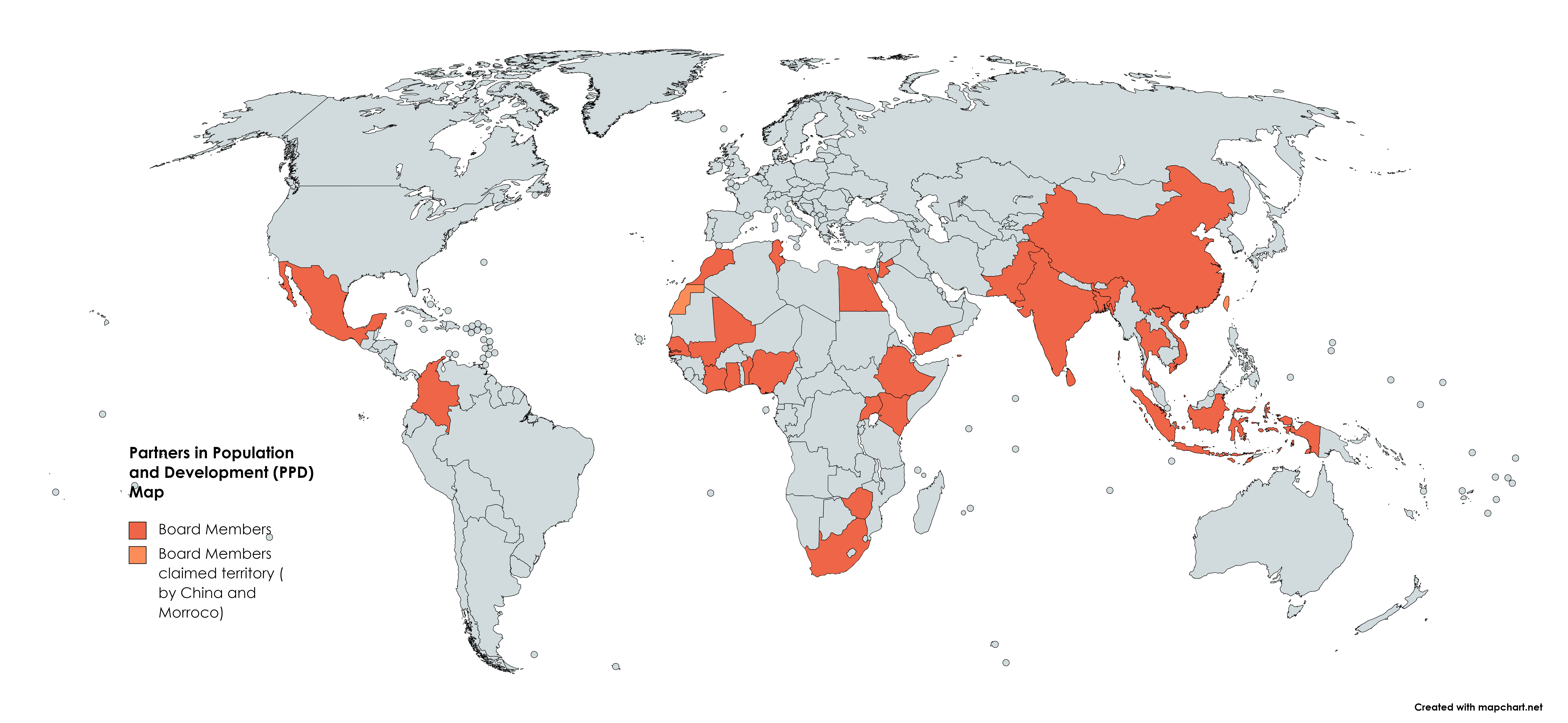
Partners in Population and Development (PPD) map

Partners in Population and Development (PPD) is a Southern-led, Southern-run global inter-governmental organization of 28 developing countries with commitment to promote south-south cooperation (SSC) in the field of reproductive health, population and development. Launched at the 1994 International Conference on Population and Development (ICPD) by ten developing countries to support implementation of the Cairo Program of Action (POA), PPD has been awarded Permanent Observer Status at the United Nations and diplomatic status in Bangladesh. PPD has established itself as a key global south-south player in its areas of operation representing about 59% of the world population.

Since its inception, PPD has contributed significantly to helping its member states improve reproductive health and family planning services, reduce maternal and child mortality and increase the voice of the global south towards addressing the ICPD agenda. The efforts of the Secretariat have contributed to PPD's institutionalization of south-south cooperation globally and established the Secretariat's permanent office building complex in Dhaka, Bangladesh.

With more than 25 years of the implementation of the ICPD Program of Action (PoA), the international community has realized that SSC is needed to tackle the unfinished ICPD agenda and the new emerging issues in Reproductive Health (RH), population and development.

According to their website, the PPD is the "only organization in the world fully dedicated to South-South partnerships."

== Vision ==
An Intergovernmental Alliance leading the promotion of South-South Cooperation towards the attainment of the global population and reproductive health agenda for sustainable development.

== Mission ==
To achieve its vision through sustained advocacy, capacity building, networking, knowledge management/ sharing and transfer of technology in the field of reproductive health and rights, population and development within the framework of south-south cooperation.

== Board Members ==
Representatives of each Member Country on the PPD Board by Region
Region	Country	Name	Position in PPD	Position in home country
Asia	Bangladesh	H.E. Mr. Sardar Md. Shakhawat Hossain	Board & Executive Committee Member	Minister of Health and Family Welfare (MOHFW) Ministry of Health and Family Welfare (MOHFW), Government of the People’s Republic of Bangladesh
Asia	China	H.E. Ms. Guo Yanhong	Board & Executive Committee Member	Vice Minister, National Health Commission (NHC), Government of the People’s Republic of China
Asia	India	H.E. Mr. Jagat Prakash Nadda	Board Member	Minister, Union Ministry of Health and Family Welfare, Government of India
Asia	Indonesia	Prof. Budi Setiyono, S.Sos, M.Pol.Admin, Ph.D	Board Member	Secretary of the Ministry of Population and Family Development/ BKKBN, Ministry of Population and Family Development/National Population and Family Planning Board (NPFPB-BKKBN), Government of the Republic of Indonesia
Asia	Pakistan	H.E. Mr. Syed Mustafa Kamal	Secretary	Federal Minister, Ministry of National Health Services, Regulations and Coordination, Government of Pakistan
Asia	Sri Lanka	H.E. Dr. Keheliya Rambukwella	Board Member	Honorable Minister of Health, Nutrition and Indigenous Medicine, Government of the Socialist Republic of Sri Lanka
Asia	Thailand	Dr. Amporn Benjaponpitak, M.D., MRC Psych	Board Member	Director-General, Department of Health, Ministry of Public Health, The Royal Thai Government
Asia	Vietnam	Dr. Le Thanh Dung	Board and Executive Committee Member	Director General, Viet Nam Population Authority (VNPA), Ministry of Health (MOH), Government of the Socialist Republic of Vietnam
Latin America & Caribbean	Colombia	H.E. Dr. Fernando Ruiz	Board Member	Minister of Health and Social Protection, Bogotá, Colombia
Latin America & Caribbean	Mexico	Ms. Gabriela Rodríguez Ramírez	Board Member	Secretary-General, Consejo Nacional de Población (CONAPO), Secretaría de Gobernación
Middle East & North Africa	Egypt	H.E. Dr. Khaled Abdul- Ghaffar	Board Member	Minister, Ministry of Health and Population, Government of the Arab Republic of Egypt
Middle East & North Africa	Jordan	H.E. Dr. Feras Tbrahim Hawari	Board Member	Minister, Ministry of Health, Government of the Hashemite Kingdom of Jordan
Middle East & North Africa	Morocco	H.E. Mr. Amine TEHRAOUI	Board Member	Minister of Health and Social Protection, Government of the Kingdom of Morocco
Middle East & North Africa	Tunisia	Prof. Mohamed Douagi	Chair	President, Director-General, National Board for Family and Population, Ministry of Health, Tunisia
Middle East & North Africa	Yemen	H.E. Dr. Ahmed Ali Bourji	Board Member	Secretary General, Technical Secretariat, National Population Council, Council of Ministers, Republic of Yemen
Sub-Saharan Africa	Benin	H.E. Professor Benjamin I. B. Hounkpatin	Board Member	Minister, Ministry of Health, Republic of Benin
Sub-Saharan Africa	Ivory Coast	Dr. Moustapha Hinin	Board member	Director-General, National Population Office, Ministry of Planning and Development, Government of Cote d’Ivoire
Sub-Saharan Africa	Ethiopia	H.E Dr. Mekdes Daba	Board member	Minister, Ministry of Health, Federal Democratic Republic of Ethiopia
Sub-Saharan Africa	Gambia	H.E. Mr. Muhammad B.S. Jallow	Board & Executive Committee Member	Vice President and Secretary, State for Women's Affairs, Government of the Gambia
Sub-Saharan Africa	Ghana	Ms. Angelina Kodua Nyanor	Board Member	Ag. Executive Director, National Population Council (NPC), Government of the Republic of Ghana
Sub-Saharan Africa	Kenya	Ms. Lucy Kimondo	Treasurer	Acting Director General, National Coordinating Agency for Population and Development (NCAPD), Kenya
Sub-Saharan Africa	Malawi	Hon. Joseph Mathyola Mwanamvekha, M.P.	Board Member	Minister of Finance, Economic Planning and Decentralisation, Government of the Republic of Malawi
Sub-Saharan Africa	Mali	Currently vacant. Not yet nominated	N/A	N/A
Sub-Saharan Africa	Nigeria	H.E. Senator Abubakar Atiku Bagadu, CON	Board Member	Minister and Deputy Chairman, National Planning Commission (NPC), Government of the Federal Republic of Nigeria
Sub-Saharan Africa	Senegal	H.E. Dr Ibrahima SY	Board Member	Minister of Health and Social Action, Government of Senegal
Sub-Saharan Africa	South Africa	H.E. Ms. Nokuzola Tolashe	Board Member	Minister for Social Development, Government of the Republic of South Africa
Sub-Saharan Africa	Uganda	H.E. Mr. Amos Lugoloobi	Board & Executive Committee Member	Minister of State for Planning, Ministry of Finance, Planning and Economic Development, Government of the Republic of Uganda
Sub-Saharan Africa	Zimbabwe	H.E. Dr Douglas Mombeshora	Vice-Chair	Minister, Ministry of Health and Child Welfare, Government of Zimbabwe
