= Cerlalc =

Regional Center for the Promotion of Books in Latin America and Caribbean
- Abbreviation: CERLALC
- Formation: March 3, 1970
- Type: Intergovernmental organization, Category 2 Center of UNESCO
- Headquarters: Bogotá, Colombia
- Region served: Iberoamerica
- Director: Margarita Cuéllar Barona
- Chair of the Council: Juan Fernando Velasco, minister of Culture of Ecuador
- Chair or Executive Committee: Suecy Callejas, minister of Culture of El Salvador
- Website: cerlalc.org

The Regional Center for the Promotion of Books in Latin America and Caribbean (CERLALC) (Spanish: Centro Regional para el Fomento del Libro en América Latina y el Caribe, Portuguese: Centro Regional para o Fomento do Livro na América Latina e no Caribe) is an intergovernmental organization sponsored by UNESCO. The organization's headquarters are located in Bogotá, Colombia. Its main goal is to foster favorable conditions for the development of reading communities in Latin America and the Caribbean.

CERLALC has 21 member states and the organization aims its activities toward book production and distribution; the promotion of reading and writing, the training of the actors of the book-publishing process and the stimulation and protection of intellectual creation. In this regard, it provides technical assistance in the formulation of public policies, generates knowledge, disseminates specialized information, develops and promotes training processes and promotes spaces for dialogue and cooperation.

== History ==
The establishment of CERLALC was part of UNESCO’s program for the promotion of books, which took place during UNESCO’s 14th general conference in Paris, in 1966. The original project included the creation of four centres for the promotion of book production: Latin America, Asia, Africa and the Arab States. The result of this conference was the beginning of one of the most successful experiences in regional integration projects around the book.

On September 7, 1967, the Colombian government requested UNESCO that the multilateral approaches for book promotion be extended to Latin America in the Program and Budget for the years 1969-1970. The request included the creation of a regional centre for the promotion of books in Latin America as a focal point for efforts aimed at promoting the free circulation and growth of regional book production and distribution.

Through Act 0253 of February 20, 1970, the Colombian government gave authorization to four local organizations to create the first board of directors of the centre. These organizations were Instituto Caro y Cuervo, Instituto Colombiano de Cultura, Colcultura, Instituto Colombiano para el Fomento de la Educación Superior, ICFES and Servicio Nacional de Aprendizaje, SENA. The national organization was named Centro Regional para el Fomento del libro en América Latina, CERLAL. (The second “C” letter was added at a later date). The Ministers of Education and Foreign Affairs, along with the National Planning Department of Colombia, were also part of this board.

On March 3, 1970, the founding act was signed, while decree 2290 established the bylaws of CERLALC as a national organism. Following this, On April 23, 1971, in Bogotá, the Colombian government and UNESCO signed an international cooperation agreement whereby Colombia committed to transforming the organization created in 1970 into a Regional Centre. This instrument allowed the addition of all Spanish-speaking countries. The Colombian congress gave its approval through Law 27 of 1971. Gradually, in the first four years, several countries of the region joined the regional project. These active countries members have been: Argentina, Bolivia, Brasil, Costa Rica, Chile, Ecuador, Panamá, Paraguay, República Dominicana, Uruguay and Venezuela.

The Agreement of International Cooperation between UNESCO and the Colombian government that governs until today, was signed in Paris on August 1, 1984, and ratified in Colombia by Law 65 of November 20, 1986. In this international agreement, the reach of the centre was extended to other geographic and linguistic areas, including the Caribbean region (Hence the second “C” letter) and to the countries of the Lusitanian Hispanic linguistic unit, even those outside geographical Latin America.

== Milestones ==
- During the 14th session of UNESCO's General conference, the working framework for strengthening book production and traffic throughout developing worlds was formalized. There was an expert assembly convened by UNESCO in 1969, advising the creation in Bogotá, of a Center for the Promotion of the Book in Latin America, helping as a focal point for cooperation to promote the free circulation and growth of production and regional distribution of books.
- On April 23, 1971, the Colombian government and UNESCO signed a mutual international cooperation agreement through which the Colombian government's pledge to turn the local Center, created in 1970, into a regional Center, was approved. When the restructuring was completed, the institution was entirely open to form any bond with all Spanish-speaking countries.
- On the same year, the first actions to promote the center were undertaken, starting with several training and formation programs focused on publishing production, production seminars and seminars about production and distribution of books. In the same way, the center, along with ALALC (Asociación Latinoamericana de Libre Comercio, the predecessor company to ALADI), developed some activities about information and regional integration.
- In 1975, the growth of the Latin American cooperation network reached an extension of 13 member states. The starting countries were Argentina, Bolivia, Brazil, Colombia, Chile, Costa Rica, Ecuador, Spain, Panama, Paraguay, Dominican Republic, Uruguay, and Venezuela. The network helped create book policies developed by Argentina and Colombia and supported by CERLALC. Additionally, the approach of the integration organisms helped enhance the common market of books, a blueprint for ISBN implementation, along with a number of co-edition and bibliographic database projects.
- In January 1977, the Colombian government and UNESCO renewed the agreement signed in 1971. It would be extended until December 31, 1982.
- In February 1979, in a seminar about Children's book publishing, there was a proposal, which suggested the creation and design of a Latin American co-edition publishing program, focused on children and young adults. The main purpose was to bring a new outreach for regional cultural diversity and broaden the quality of the bid sideways to save costs.
- In August of that same year, during the first Latin American co-edition assembly, the idea grew larger and, in March 1982, the group published its first edition of “Cuentos, mitos y leyendas de América Latina” with a print-run of 20.000 copies.
- In 1982, Cerlal reached an agreement with the International Standard Book Number (ISBN) to promote the use of this identifier in Latin America. The only available agencies were in Mexico (1977) and Brazil (1978), therefore the creation of agencies was encouraged in several countries such as Argentina (1982), Costa Rica (1983), Colombia (1984), Venezuela (1984), Ecuador (1986), Chile (1986), Cuba (1989) Uruguay (1990) and Peru (1995).
- Between 1984 and 1985, the Latin America Traveling Exhibition of Illustrations and Books for Children and Young People was introduced to the public. The CERLALC lead the way to garner greater attention and visibility over children's books, especially illustrated books. This presentation spread the work of graphic illustrators working in the area, increased awareness on the topic in the countries, and inspired the creation of academic programs on illustration.
- In 1988, CERLALC organized a first ISBN agencies meeting in Latin America. In this meeting, all beneficiary countries who had received support, were given a practical seminar on ISBN.
- In 1991, the first ISBN assigning software in Latin America was developed. Following this, in coordination with the ISBN agencies of Venezuela and Colombia, the first version of the Integrated Administration program of ISBN Agencies (PAII) was created.
- In 1993, the Guayaquil type law was drafted and, through this Book law, actions were pursued to promote publishing industries, granting tax exemptions and public purchases. Likewise, this law promoted the intellectual creation, reading promotion, and defense of copyright. It is important to mention this text became a mechanism for the homogenization of the national book legislations standing as an example of standards to Ibero-American lawmakers.
- In August 1994, CERLALC gathered a general meeting, all of the copyright chair holders from the main Latin America universities were invited at the request of UNESCO. In this meeting, UNESCO gave the attending professors relevant information about the UNITWIN program hosted by UNESCO chairs, to set up a network of university lecturers on copyright in the region. On 1995, began the implementation of UNITWIN UNESCO chair program on copyright and related rights in Latin America.
- In 1998, during the 8th Ibero-American Conference of Heads of State and Governments, the Ibero-American Integrated Sales book directory, or Repertorio Integrado de Libros en Venta en Iberoamérica (RILVI) was created. The main purposes were to collect all the relevant data about the ISBN records and titles linked to national ISBN agencies. The CERLALC was the promoter and main creator of the first regional inventory of editorial offers. On 2010, RILVI stopped being a summit feature program and was turned into a permanent CERLALC activity.
- In 1998, the Ibero-American Cooperation Program on Public Libraries or Programa Iberoamericana de Cooperación en materia de Bibliotecas Públicas (PICBIP) was created. During the same year, in November, in Cartagena de Indias was held the Ibero-American Encounter of National Managers of Public Libraries. The General Directorate of Books, Archives and Libraries of the Ministry of Education and Culture of Spain, organized and hosted this event, with the sponsorship of the Spanish Agency for International Cooperation or Agencia Española de Cooperación Internacional (AECI) and the help of CERLALC. The main goal of this encounter was to start a steady funding mechanism to exchange data, experiences and allow the development of joint actions.
- In 2003, the XIII Summit of Ibero-American Presidents and Heads of State approved the Ibero-American Reading Plan (ILIMITA) at Santa Cruz de la Sierra, Bolivia.
- In September 2004, the first Meeting of National Reading Managers was held in Cartagena. In this meeting, the first white paper was presented to the 21 states of Ibero-America. This document included the reading political agenda, which included eleven main concerns about public reading policies. Note should also be taken on the presented recommendations to reach the settled goals, the actions and methods to promote reading throughout an integral perspective which involves the state-will and also to promote a stronger cooperation of different stakeholders on this subject.
- In 2006, the National Network of Reading Plans (Redplanes) was created by a group of entities and people concerned with supporting the search for strategies to streamline policy formulation, and its translation into concrete actions in favor of written culture.
- Also in 2006, a General Experts Assembly was held to discuss the implementation of public policies on copyright. The results of this event, organized by CERLALC, were included in the publication “Diagnosis of copyright in Latin America”. This document outlined the institutional reality of copyright in the region. Also, it highlighted the importance of having an observatory in charge to promote the measurement of the economic impact of creative industries in the region. The results showed that these industries were a key factor for the dissemination of specialized information on copyright. Therefore, it led to the subsequent creation of the Ibero-American Copyright Observatory (ODAI).
- In 2007, the RISBN software was developed. It was a partnership work between CERLALC and the Colombian Book Chamber to develop a software which provided an ease of request to ISBN online. This program would work with all available minimum metadata generated by ONIX.
- In 2010, CERLALC via Ibero-American Copyright Observatory, and a partnership with British council, published two documents named “Creative economy: An introductory guide” and “A practical guide to map the creative industries”. These documents remarked the importance of cultural goods and services in minimizing the impact of political polarization and economic inequality. Simultaneously, these documents gave general guidelines about public policies to measure the impact of creative industries on gross domestic product and job creation, as well as designing promotional strategies for industries protected by copyright in local economies.
- In 2011, a law model, consulted with a group of Ibero-American experts, was presented, its purpose was to give all Latin American countries a mechanism to achieve a formulation for the new book, reading culture and libraries laws. Also, this law model would help deal with the components of the sector in a balanced way, as well as making progress in the construction of reading societies.
- In 2011, the Ibero-American Cooperation Program in Public Libraries (PICBIP) evaluated the overall balance of its first decade, the results showed that the project's scope was limited. Following these results, the Iberbibliotecas Program was created, to contribute to the development and strengthening of public libraries in Latin America.
- In June 2013, CERLAC convened the Intergovernmental Panel “Nueva Agenda por el libro y la lectura: Recomendaciones para Políticas Públicas en Iberoamerica” wherein were presented the further roads to action and suggestions to the local governments regarding book policies. Deputies from 17 states, members and agents from UNESCO, composed this panel during this event, CERLALC identified the most pressing needs of the region to accompany the implementation of the new agenda for books and reading.
- Between 2014 and 2015, there was an important online training course taken by 6.000 educative agents charged with tending to early childhood. The purpose of this course was the promotion of reading, children's literature, art, culture and expressive language skills. This training course was under the framework “Fiesta de la Lectura”, sponsored by Instituto Colombiano de Bienestar Familiar (ICBF), whose main aim was to guarantee the conditions for the development of communicative, expressive and reading skills in children from 0 to 6 years of age.
- In November 2015, CERLALC invited five Latin American subject experts on the early childhood sector. These special guests discussed topics related to education, reading culture, and comprehensive care regarding this children population. The attending experts were Eva Janovitz (Mexico), María Emilia López (Argentina), Patricia Pereira Leite (Brazil), Evelio Cabrejo (Colombia) and Yolanda Reyes (Colombia). The discussion highlighted once again the importance of several key aspects for making small children active subjects of practices around written and oral language. As a result, they established the main theoretical guidelines to promote the creation of the Ibero-American Observatory of Culture and Education for the Early Childhood (OPI).
- In 2016, the exhibition “Contra Viento y Marea” was held. In it, 150 successful projects from different Latin-American countries were collected. These projects presented government initiatives for the promotion of reading and democratic access to books between the end of the 19th century and the first decade of the 2000s. Besides this, CERLALC celebrated the 30th anniversary of the International Book Fair of Guadalajara, with Latin-America as a guest of honour at the book fair. The second edition of “Contra Viento y Marea” was held within the framework of the 30th celebration of Bogotá's Book Fair, 2017.
- In 2017, the VI Meeting of the Ibero-American Network of Policy Makers and Reading Plans was held. During the event, agents from 15 Redplanes member countries met with regional teams of institutions linked to the National Reading Plan of Chile. The Valparaíso Declaration emerged from this meeting; it reaffirms the importance of strengthening regulatory, legislative and budgetary frameworks to guarantee the continuity of the plans.
- In 2018, the Colombian government implemented a statute to safeguard orphaned literary works. They took into account the basis of a proposal by the CERLALC, presented in 2015 and endorsed by the Centre of academic and political spaces in 2018. The amendment to Law 23 of 1982 on copyright and related rights, made through Law 1915 of 2018, is a tool of special value for promoting the development of libraries in Colombia and implementing new strategies to promote access to a wide diversity of contents for users.

== Action lines ==
To fulfil its main statements, CERLALC leads and supports local and regional actions in the following plans of action.

- Consultancy and technical help: The Cerlalc offers a wide variety of services related to its member states. Among these services, it is possible to find design, upgrade and achievement of the publishing industrial policies, libraries systems, reading promotion and copyright.
- Investigation: The specialized knowledge creation is primarily deemed to inform and follow the consecution of public policies in the Ibero-American region. It also helps to foster strategic decisions with private, public and the civil society sectors around the development of reading societies.
- Formation: Cerlalc has set the backbone to promote the reading societies throughout programs which fulfill the vital need of technical help in the state members. These programs turn around the reading promotion, libraries and copyright. Besides, these courses, on-site and virtual, are a reliable option to reach general and specific objectives on joint projects.
- Publishing:The publishing activities are en route to give visibility and dissemination to the researches carried by the center and its experts' advisors. In addition to the above, the main focus of these projects is to build an international inventory, in order to develop thinking and the actors' labor of the region and the world.
- Projects: The articulation of these permanent programs requires cooperation between different sectors in Ibero-American societies. These programs integrate the public and private sectors to achieve the specific objectives that promote knowledge management closely aligned with the center's mission objectives and specialized programs. Cerlalc coordinates the Latin American Observatory of Culture and Early Childhood Education and exercises the functions of the Technical Unit of the Ibero-American Program of Public Libraries (Iberbibliotecas).

== Directors since its creation ==
| Name | Period |
|---|---|
| Arcadio Plazas | 1972-1975 |
| Carlos Eslava | 1976-1977 |
| Gonzalo Canal | 1978-1979 |
| Jaime Jaramillo | 1980-1985 |
| Édgar Bustamante | 1986-1987 |
| Óscar Delgado | 1987-1989 |
| Luis Horacio López | 1989-1990 |
| Jorge Salazar | 1991-1995 |
| Carmen Barvo | 1995-1999 |
| Alma Byington de Arboleda | 1999-2000 |
| Adelaida Nieto | 2000-2005 |
| Isadora de Norden | 2005 - 2009 |
| Fernando Zapata | 2009-2015 |
| Marianne Ponsford | 2015-2019 |
| Andrés Ossa Quintero | 2020-to date |

== Headquarters ==
CERLALC's first headquarters was granted by Colombia's Ministry of Education. It was located in the historical center of Bogotá. Due to staff extension, a new headquarters was needed soon after. That is why in 1973, the CERLALC acquired its new and current main office.
