= International organisations in Africa =

—The following table lists the independent African states, and their memberships in selected organisations and treaties.

State (57)	GNI	Currency	UN	AU	Interregional			South African		West African						Central African		East African		North African
State (57)	GNI	Currency	UN	AU	CEN-SAD	COMESA	CEPGL	SADC	SACU	ECOWAS	UEMOA	WAMZ	MRU	LGA	AES	ECCAS	CEMAC	IGAD	EAC	AMU
Angola	3,940	Kz	UN	AU		x		SADC								ECCAS				
Benin	780	XOF (Fr)	UN	AU	CEN-SAD					ECOWAS	UEMOA									
Botswana	6,790	P	UN	AU				SADC	SACU											
Burkina Faso	550	XOF (Fr)	UN	AU	CEN-SAD						UEMOA			LGA	AES					
Burundi	170	FBu	UN	AU		COMESA	CEPGL									ECCAS			EAC	
Cameroon	1,180	XAF (Fr)	UN	AU												ECCAS	CEMAC			
Cape Verde	3,270	CVE (Esc or $)	UN	AU	x					ECOWAS										
Central African Republic	470	XAF (Fr)	UN	AU	CEN-SAD											ECCAS	CEMAC			
Chad	620	XAF (Fr)	UN	AU	CEN-SAD											ECCAS	CEMAC			
Comoros	750	FC	UN	AU	CEN-SAD	COMESA														
(Democratic Republic of the Congo) Congo, Democratic Republic of the	180	CDF (Fr)	UN	AU		COMESA	CEPGL	SADC								ECCAS				
(Republic of the Congo) Congo, Republic of the	2,150	XAF (Fr)	UN	AU						ECOWAS	UEMOA					ECCAS	CEMAC			
(Ivory Coast) Côte d'Ivoire	1,160	XOF (Fr)	UN	AU	CEN-SAD					ECOWAS	UEMOA		MRU							
Djibouti	1,270	DJF (Fr)	UN	AU	CEN-SAD	COMESA												IGAD		
Egypt	2,440	(E£ or ج.م)	UN	AU	CEN-SAD	COMESA				ECOWAS										
Equatorial Guinea	14,540	XAF (Fr)	UN	AU						ECOWAS						ECCAS	CEMAC			
Eritrea	340	Nfk	UN	AU	CEN-SAD	COMESA				ECOWAS								IGAD		
Ethiopia	390	Br	UN	AU		COMESA												IGAD		
Gabon	7,740	XPF (Fr)	UN	AU												ECCAS	CEMAC			
(The Gambia) Gambia, The	450	D	UN	AU	CEN-SAD					ECOWAS		WAMZ								
Ghana	1,230	₵	UN	AU	CEN-SAD					ECOWAS		WAMZ								
Guinea	400	FG)	UN	AU	CEN-SAD					ECOWAS		WAMZ	MRU							
Guinea-Bissau	590	XOF (Fr)	UN	AU	CEN-SAD					ECOWAS	UEMOA									
Kenya	790	KSh	UN	AU	x	COMESA												IGAD	EAC	
Lesotho	1,040	L and R	UN	AU		x		SADC	SACU	ECOWAS										
Liberia	200	L$	UN	AU	x					ECOWAS		WAMZ	MRU							
Libya	12,320	LD or ل.د	UN	AU	CEN-SAD	COMESA														AMU
Madagascar	430	Ar	UN	AU		COMESA		SADC												
Malawi	330	MK	UN	AU		COMESA		SADC												
Mali	600	XOF (Fr)	UN	AU	CEN-SAD						UEMOA			LGA	AES					
Mauritania	1,030	UM	UN	AU	CEN-SAD					x										AMU
Mauritius	7,750	Rs	UN	AU		COMESA		SADC												
Morocco	2,900	DH or د.م.	UN	AU	CEN-SAD															AMU
Mozambique	440	Mt	UN	AU		x		SADC												
Namibia	4,500	N$ and R	UN	AU		x		SADC	SACU											
Niger	370	XOF (Fr)	UN	AU	CEN-SAD						UEMOA			LGA	AES					
Nigeria	1,180	₦	UN	AU	CEN-SAD					ECOWAS		WAMZ								
Rwanda	520	FRw)	UN	AU		COMESA	CEPGL												EAC	
Sahrawi Arab Democratic Republic	n/d	DA or د.ج and MRO (UM) and MAD (د. م.) and (Ptas)		AU																
São Tomé and Príncipe	1,200	Db	UN	AU	x											ECCAS				
Senegal	1,090	XOF (Fr)	UN	AU	CEN-SAD	COMESA				ECOWAS	UEMOA									
Seychelles	9,760	Rs	UN	AU		COMESA		SADC												
Sierra Leone	340	Le	UN	AU	CEN-SAD					ECOWAS		WAMZ	MRU							
Somalia	n/d	Sh.So.	UN	AU	CEN-SAD													IGAD	Applied	
Somaliland	n/d	Sl.Sh.																		
South Africa	6,090	R	UN	AU				SADC	SACU	ECOWAS										
South Sudan	n/d	£ SSP	UN	AU		COMESA												IGAD	EAC	
Sudan	1,270	LS	UN	AU	CEN-SAD	COMESA												IGAD		
(Eswatini) Swaziland	2,630	L	UN	AU		COMESA		SADC	SACU											
Tanzania	530	TSh	UN	AU		x		SADC											EAC	
Togo	490	XOF (Fr)	UN	AU	CEN-SAD					ECOWAS	UEMOA									
Tunisia	4,060	DT or د.ت	UN	AU	CEN-SAD											ECCAS				AMU
Uganda	500	USh	UN	AU		COMESA												IGAD	EAC	
Zambia	1,070	ZK	UN	AU		COMESA		SADC												
Zimbabwe	460	P and £stg and € and R and US$ and ZiG	UN	AU		COMESA		SADC												

Euler diagram showing the relationships between various supranational African organisations.

high income ($12,276 or more)
higher middle income ($3,976 - $12,275)
lower middle income ($1,006 - $3,975)
low income ($1,005 or less)
"Name of Organisation" (member states)
x (former members)
Applied (members that have applied to an organisation)

== See also ==
- List of countries in Africa
- List of countries by GNI (nominal) per capita
- Africa
- List of conflicts in Africa
- List of international rankings
- International organization
