= Asia Cooperation Dialogue =

Intergovernmental organization

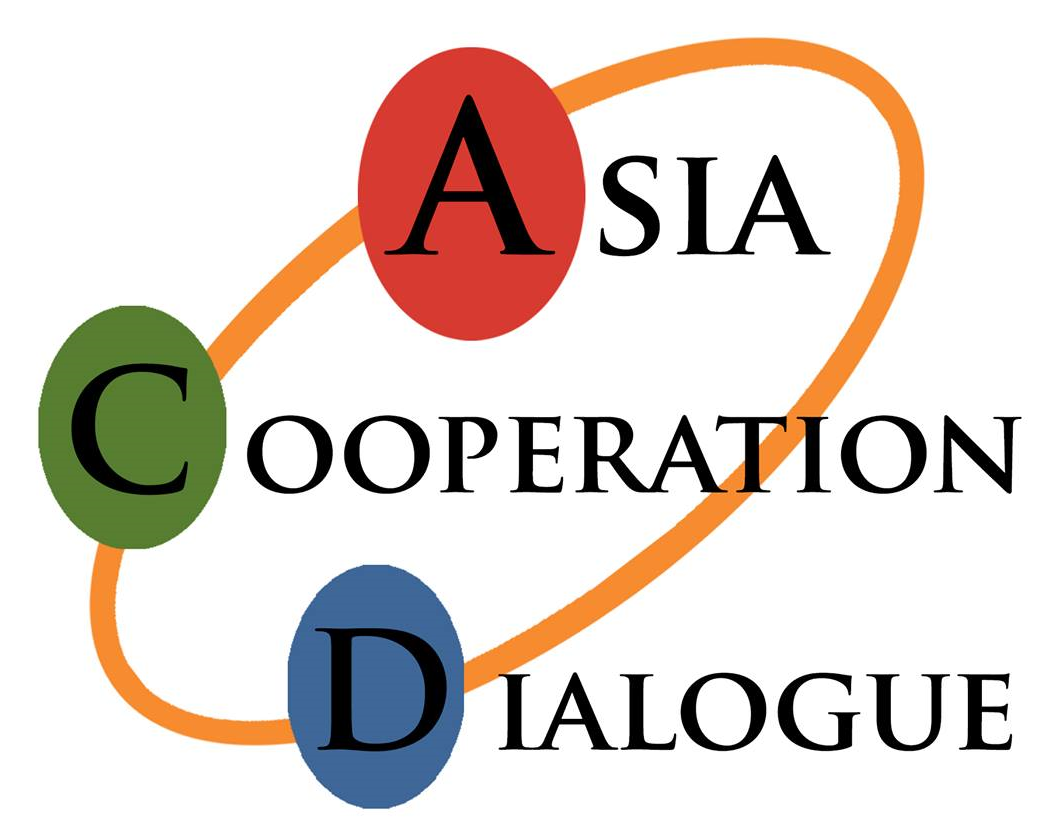
- Logo

- Member states in yellow
- Headquarters: Kuwait City
- Official languages: English
- Type: Regional cooperation organizations
- Members: 35 Countries: Afghanistan; Bahrain; Bangladesh; Bhutan; Brunei; Cambodia; China; India; Indonesia; Iran; Japan; Kazakhstan; Kuwait; Kyrgyzstan; Laos; Malaysia; Mongolia; Myanmar; Nepal; Oman; Pakistan; Palestine; Philippines; Qatar; Russia; Saudi Arabia; Singapore; South Korea; Sri Lanka; Tajikistan; Thailand; Turkey; United Arab Emirates; Uzbekistan; Vietnam

Leaders
  - Secretary-General: Nasser Al-Motairi
- Establishment: 2002

Area
  - Total: 46,872,864 km^{2} (18,097,714 sq mi)

Population
  - Estimate: 4,317,290,284
  - Density: 92/km^{2} (238.3/sq mi)
- Website; ACD-Dialogue.org

The Asia Cooperation Dialogue (ACD) is an intergovernmental organization created on 18 June 2002 to promote Asian cooperation at a continental level and to ensure coordination among different regional organizations such as the ASEAN, the Gulf Cooperation Council, the Eurasian Economic Union, the Shanghai Cooperation Organisation, and the SAARC. It is the first international organization to cover the whole of Asia. Its secretariat is in Kuwait City.

== History ==
The idea of the Asia Cooperation Dialogue was raised at the First International Conference of Asian Political Parties (held in Manila in September 2000) by Surakiart Sathirathai, then deputy leader of the now defunct Thai Rak Thai Party, on behalf of his party leader, Thaksin Shinawatra, then Prime Minister of Thailand. It was suggested that Asia as a continent should have its own forum to discuss Asia-wide cooperation. Afterwards, the idea of the ACD was formally put forward during the 34th ASEAN Foreign Ministers Meeting in Hanoi in July 2001 and at the ASEAN Foreign Ministers Retreat in Phuket in February 2002.

=== Ministerial meetings ===
Meeting	Location	Date(s)
1st	(Thailand) Cha-am	18–19 June 2002
2nd	(Thailand) Chiang Mai	21–22 June 2003
3rd	(China) Qingdao	21–22 June 2004
4th	(Pakistan) Islamabad	4–6 April 2005
5th	(Qatar) Doha	23–24 May 2006
6th	(South Korea) Seoul	5–6 June 2007
7th	(Kazakhstan) Astana	16–17 October 2008
8th	(Sri Lanka) Colombo	15–16 October 2009
9th	(Iran) Tehran	8–9 November 2010
10th	Kuwait City	10–11 October 2012
11th	(Tajikistan) Dushanbe	29 March 2013
12th	(Bahrain) Manama	26 November 2013
13th	(Saudi Arabia) Riyadh	25 November 2014
14th	(Thailand) Bangkok	9–10 March 2016
15th	(United Arab Emirates) Abu Dhabi	16–17 January 2017
16th	(Qatar) Doha	30 April 2019
17th	(Turkey) Ankara	21 January 2021
18th	(United States) New York	September 20-21, 2023

=== Summits ===
Summit	Location	Dates
1st	Kuwait City	15–17 October 2012
2nd	(Thailand) Bangkok	8–10 October 2016
3rd	(Qatar) Doha	2–3 October 2024

== Member states ==
A clickable Euler diagram showing the relationships between various Asian regional organizations

Membership and expansion of the Asia Cooperation Dialogue: Founding members 2003 2004 2005 2006 2008 2010 or later

The ACD was founded by 18 members. Since May 2019, the organization consists of 35 states as listed below (including all current members of the ASEAN and the GCC). Overlapping regional organization membership in italics.

Name	Accession date	Regional organization
Afghanistan	17 October 2012	SAARC, ECO
Bahrain	18 June 2002	GCC, AL
Bangladesh	18 June 2002	SAARC, BIMSTEC
Bhutan (Note: One more membership request was finally confirmed at the ACD Breakfast Meeting of 27 September 2004)	27 September 2004	SAARC, BIMSTEC
Brunei	18 June 2002	ASEAN
Cambodia	18 June 2002	ASEAN, MGC
China	18 June 2002	SCO
India	18 June 2002	SAARC, BIMSTEC, MGC, SCO
Indonesia	18 June 2002	ASEAN
Iran	21 June 2004	ECO, SCO
Japan	18 June 2002	—
Kazakhstan (Note: Located partially in Europe.)	21 June 2003	CIS, ECO, SCO
South Korea	18 June 2002	—
Kuwait	21 June 2003	GCC, AL
Kyrgyzstan	16 October 2008	CIS, ECO, SCO
Laos	18 June 2002	ASEAN, MGC
Malaysia	18 June 2002	ASEAN
Mongolia	21 June 2004	—
Myanmar	18 June 2002	ASEAN, BIMSTEC, MGC
Nepal	10 March 2016	SAARC, BIMSTEC
Oman	21 June 2003	GCC, AL
Pakistan	18 June 2002	SAARC, SCO, ECO
Philippines	18 June 2002	ASEAN
Palestine	1 May 2019	AL
Qatar	18 June 2002	GCC, AL
Russia	4 April 2005	CIS, SCO
Saudi Arabia	4 April 2005	GCC, AL
Singapore	18 June 2002	ASEAN
Sri Lanka	21 June 2003	SAARC, BIMSTEC
Tajikistan	5 June 2006	CIS, ECO, SCO
Thailand	18 June 2002	ASEAN, BIMSTEC, MGC
Turkey	26 September 2013	CoE, (Note: Turkey is a European Union candidate since 1999.) ECO, NATO
United Arab Emirates	21 June 2004	GCC, AL
Uzbekistan	5 June 2006	CIS, ECO, SCO
Vietnam	18 June 2002	ASEAN, MGC

== See also ==
- Asia Council
- Asia–Europe Meeting
- Asian Clearing Union
- Asian Currency Unit
- Asian Development Bank
- Asian Infrastructure Investment Bank
- Asian Parliamentary Assembly
- Belt and Road Initiative
- Conference on Interaction and Confidence-Building Measures in Asia
- Continental regional organizations
- Continental union
- East Asia Community
- Eurasian Economic Union
- International organization
- Pan-Asianism
- Shanghai Cooperation Organisation
