= International organization membership of the Philippines =

The following is a list of international organizations in which the Philippines officially participates.

== List of international organization memberships of the Philippines ==
- Asian Development Bank (ADB)
- Asia-Pacific Economic Cooperation (APEC)
- Asia-Pacific Telecommunity (APT)
- Association of Southeast Asian Nations (ASEAN)
- Association of Southeast Asian Nations Regional Forum (ARF)
- Bank for International Settlements (BIS)
- Colombo Plan (CP)
- East Asia Summit (EAS)
- Food and Agriculture Organization (FAO)
- Group of 24 (G24)
- Group of 77 (G77)
- International Atomic Energy Agency (IAEA)
- International Bank for Reconstruction and Development (IBRD)
- International Chamber of Commerce (ICC)
- International Civil Aviation Organization (ICAO)
- International Criminal Court (ICCt) (signatory)
- International Criminal Police Organization (Interpol)
- International Development Association (IDA)
- International Federation of Red Cross and Red Crescent Societies (IFRCS)
- International Finance Corporation (IFC)
- International Fund for Agricultural Development (IFAD)
- International Human Rights Defense Committee (IHRDC)
- International Hydrographic Organization (IHO)
- International Labour Organization (ILO)
- International Maritime Organization (IMO)
- International Mobile Satellite Organization (IMSO)
- International Monetary Fund (IMF)
- International Olympic Committee (IOC)
- International Organization for Migration (IOM)
- International Organization for Standardization (ISO)
- International Paralympic Committee (IPC)
- International Red Cross and Red Crescent Movement (ICRM)
- International Rice Research Institute (IRRI)
- International Telecommunication Union (ITU)
- International Telecommunications Satellite Organization (ITSO)
- International Trade Union Confederation (ITUC)
- Inter-Parliamentary Union (IPU)
- Multilateral Investment Guarantee Agency (MIGA)
- Nonaligned Movement (NAM)
- Organisation for the Prohibition of Chemical Weapons (OPCW)
- Organization of American States (OAS) (observer)
- Pacific Islands Forum (PIF) (partner)
- Unión Latina
- United Nations (ONU)
- United Nations Conference on Trade and Development (UNCTAD)
- United Nations Educational, Scientific, and Cultural Organization (UNESCO)
- United Nations High Commissioner for Refugees (UNHCR)
- United Nations Industrial Development Organization (UNIDO)
- United Nations Integrated Mission in Timor-Leste (UNMIT)
- United Nations Mission in Liberia (UNMIL)
- United Nations Mission in the Sudan (UNMIS)
- United Nations Operation in Cote d'Ivoire (UNOCI)
- United Nations Stabilization Mission in Haiti (MINUSTAH)
- Universal Postal Union (UPU)
- World Confederation of Labour (WCL)
- World Customs Organization (WCO)
- World Federation of Trade Unions (WFTU)
- World Health Organization (WHO)
- World Intellectual Property Organization (WIPO)
- World Meteorological Organization (WMO)
- World Tourism Organization (UNWTO)
- World Trade Organization (WTO)

== See also ==
- Foreign policy of the Philippines
- Foreign relations of the Philippines
- Philippines and the United Nations
