= Partnerships in Environmental Management for the Seas of East Asia =

Regional partnership programme

- Abbreviation: PEMSEA
- Formation: 1994
- Type: IGO
- Purpose: Marine and coastal areas environmental management
- Headquarters: Quezon City, Philippines
- Region served: East and Southeast Asia
- Executive Director: Stephen Adrian Ross
- Parent organization: UNDP, UNOPS
- Website: www.pemsea.org

Partnerships in Environmental Management for the Seas of East Asia (PEMSEA) is a regional partnership programme implemented by the United Nations Development Programme (UNDP) and executed by the United Nations Office for Project Services (UNOPS). The project, started in 1994, was originally known as Prevention and Management of Marine Pollution in the East Asian Seas (SDS-SEA).

PEMSEA is currently being hosted by the Philippines' Department of Environment and Natural Resources and holds its office in the DENR compound in Quezon City, Philippines.

== History ==
In December 1993, several integrated coastal management (ICM) pilot sites were established, including Xiamen (PR China) and Batangas Bay (Philippines), which helped start efforts in addressing marine pollution problems in the Straits of Malacca and Straits of Singapore; and increasing capacity development in the regions of Cambolia, China, DPR Korea, Indonesia, Philippines, Thailand and Viet Nam. A second phase of the Project, implemented between 1999 and 2007, was supported by the Global Environmental Facility (GEF), focused on building partnerships between stakeholders. The project was renamed to PEMSEA to reflect the new thrust of the programme.

In 2003, participating governments and stakeholders of the organization issued Sustainable Development Strategy for the Seas of East Asia (SDS-SEA) to promote a common vision in the area of sustainable development in the region. In 2007, PEMSEA committed itself to implementing the SDS-SEA as a part of Phase I project (2007-2017). The latest phase's aim is to make PEMSEA a self-sustaining regional operating mechanism.

PEMSEA's areas of work include coastal and ocean governance, natural and man-made hazard prevention and management, habitat protection, restoration and management, water use and supply management, pollution and waste reduction management, as well as food security and livelihood management.

One of the important tasks that PEMSEA assumes is turning the knowledge about regional coastal into action that can improve the status quo. PEMSEA capitalizes on its broad intergovernmental, financial and intellectual resources to come up with the best solutions problems of sustainable coastal management.

== East Asian Seas Congress ==
Every three years, PEMSEA hosts the East Asian Seas Congress that consists of a Ministerial Forum, an International Conference and other events. The conference focuses on tracking progress of SDS-SEA, encourages knowledge exchange and raises important issues regarding coastal management in the region. It also tries to engage private sector in helping develop sustainable financial and business solutions to coastal management problems. The first East Asian Seas Congress was held in December 2003 in Putrajaya, Malaysia. It was organized following the recommendations of the World Summit on Sustainable Development (WSSD) with the goal to improve situation related to coasts and oceans. The following two congresses were held in Haikou City, Hainan Province, PR China, in the year 2006 and in Philippines in the year 2009. The 2012 congress was held with the theme "Building a Blue Economy: Strategy, Opportunities, and Partnerships in the Seas of East Asia" in July 2012 in Changwon City, the Republic of Korea.

== National and regional agreements and declarations ==
The programme was instrumental to the adoption of several national and regional agreements, including:

- Putrajaya Declaration: Brunei Darussalam, Cambodia, PR China, DPR Korea, Indonesia, Japan, Malaysia, Philippines, RO Korea, Singapore, Thailand and Vietnam adopted the Putrajaya Declaration of Regional Cooperation for the Sustainable Development of the Seas of East Asia on 12 December 2003. The declaration formally adopted the SDS-SEA as a regional strategy for the sustainable development of the seas of the region.
- Haikou Partnership Agreement: Signed by the original signatories of the Putrajaya Declaration (with the exception of Brunei Darussalam and Malaysia) and Japan, the agreement established the coordinating and operating mechanisms of the implementation of the SDS-SEA.
- Manila Bay Declaration: Signed in 2001, the declaration is a commitment between the national government and concerned local government units in the Philippines for the implementation of the Manila Bay Coastal Strategy, providing an environmental management framework for Manila Bay and its watersheds.
- Bohai Sea Declaration: Governors of Liaoning, Hebei, Shandong and Tianjin, together with the Administrator of China's State Oceanic Administration signed the Bohai Declaration on Environmental Protection, formally adopting principles, objectives, policy measures and actions to reduce waste and marine pollution across the administrative boundaries of the adjacent coastal municipalities and provinces.
- Executive Order 533 (Philippines): EO533 declared integrated coastal management (ICM) as the national strategy for sustainable development of the country's marine and coastal resources.

== Partners and collaborators ==
PEMSEA's partners include the following countries and organizations:

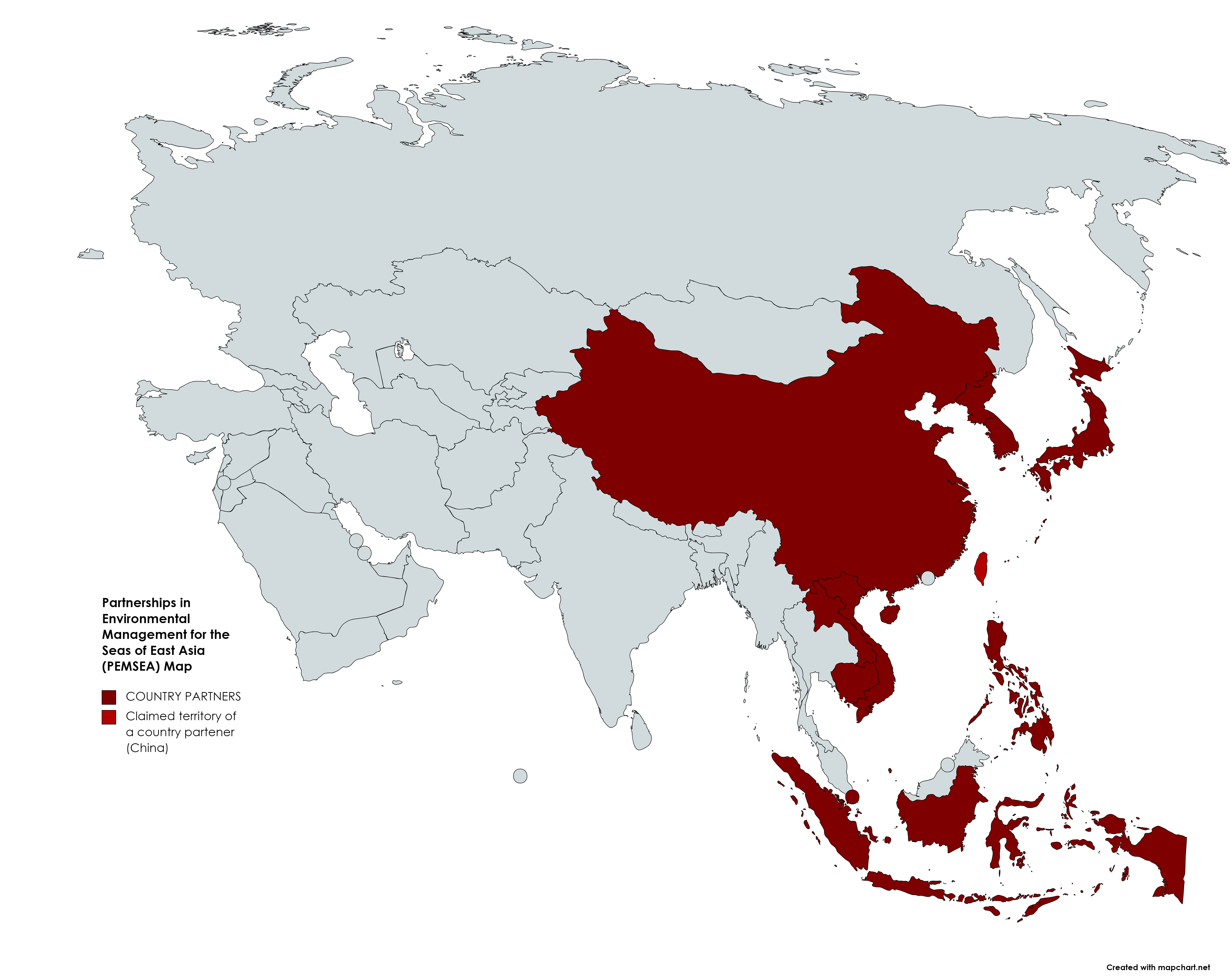
Partnerships in Environmental Management for the Seas of East Asia PEMSEA Map

=== Country partners ===
- Cambodia
- China
- Indonesia
- Japan
- Laos
- North Korea
- Philippines
- South Korea
- Singapore
- Thailand
- Timor-Leste
- Vietnam

=== Non-country partners ===
- ASEAN Center for Biodiversity
- Conservation International Philippines
- Coastal Management Center
- IOC Subcommission for the Western Pacific
- International Ocean Institute
- International Environmental Management of Enclosed Coastal Seas Center
- International Union for Conservation of Nature - Asia Regional Office
- Korea Environment Institute
- Korea Maritime Institute
- Korea Ocean Research and Development Institute
- Northwest Pacific Action Plan
- Ocean Policy and Research Foundation
- Oil Spill Response
- Plymouth Marine Laboratory
- Swedish Environmental Secretariat for Asia
- UNDP/GEF Small Grants Programme
- UNEP Global Programme of Action
- UNDP/GEF Yellow Sea LME Project

=== Collaborators ===
- Department of Sustainability and Environment, Victoria, Australia
- National Oceanic and Atmospheric Administration, United States Department of Commerce
- Victorian Coastal Council, Victoria, Australia
