= The Forum of Ministers of Environment of Latin America and the Caribbean =

The Forum of Ministers of the Environment of Latin America and the Caribbean is a body that meets under the United Nations Environment Programme to discuss environmental issues and priorities within the region.

It is the most important and high-level space for political dialogue and collaboration on environmental issues in the region and one of the oldest in the world. It was created in 1982 and has been made up of the 33 countries of the region since its inception. The main objective of the Forum is to provide a space for governments to establish priorities for environmental action, and to collaborate in the implementation of programs, projects and approaches to address those priorities in the region. It also serves as the regional coordinating body for the United Nations Environment Assembly (UNEA). The main meetings are held every two years, while in the interim period, various sessions are held with members of the Forum's Board of Directors or High-Level Officials.

This year, its 23rd edition will be held in Panama from October 24-26. The agenda will include keynotes, expert panels, interactive sessions and networking opportunities, all of which can be followed on the Forum's YouTube channel. Peculiarly, this year it will be held in parallel with the Latin American and Caribbean Climate Week, organized by the United Nations Framework Convention on Climate Change (UNFCCC), of which UNEP is part of its Secretariat.

== Organization and participation ==
The Forum was formed in 1982 and is part of the United Nations Environment Programme in the Regional Office of Latin America and the Caribbean, with meetings every two years. All thirty-three countries within the region are invited to be a part of the Forum, as are other interested parties including NGOs. The official languages of the Forum are Spanish and English.

The Conference of Ministers is preceded by a conference of High-Level Experts who meet ahead of the ministers in order to provide the technical information necessary for the ministers to make decisions. The forum is responsible for meeting to strategize action on themes related to sustainable development and the environment within Latin America and the Caribbean.

== Meetings and objectives ==
Date	Location	Goals	Main outcomes
1982	Mexico City, Mexico		
1983	Buenos Aires, Argentina		
1984	Lima, Peru		
1985	Cancún, Mexico		
1987	Montevideo, Uruguay		
March 27–31, 1989	Brasilia, Brazil		
October 17–23, 1990	Puerto España, Trinidad and Tobago		
March 12–15, 1993	Santiago, Chile	Follow up on regional priorities and positions from the Rio Summit in 1992	
September 21–26, 1995	Havana, Cuba		
October 31 – November 2, 1996	Buenos Aires, Argentina		
March 10–13, 1998	Lima, Peru	Identify regional funding sources; Establish common regional positions for larger UNEP conventions; Create a regional agenda	
March 2–7, 2000	Bridgetown, Barbados	Address regional issues of climate change, deforestation, and urban growth; Discuss effective simultaneous implementation of several multilateral environmental agreements	
October 21–23, 2001	Rio de Janeiro, Brazil	Create a Regional Action Plan for 2002–2005; Address regional issues of deforestation and vulnerability of urban environments; Discuss regional environmental priorities within an international context	
November 20–25, 2003	Panama City, Panama	Develop implementation strategy for the Latin American and Caribbean Initiative for Sustainable Development (ILAC)	
October 31 – November 4, 2005	Caracas, Venezuela	Consider and determine priority actions based on the first two years of implementation for ILAC	
January 2008	Santo Domingo, The Dominican Republic	Evaluate progress after five years of ILAC and identify future focus and implementation; Discuss regional issues of climate change, integrated management of ecosystems, and environmental mainstreaming	
April 26–30, 2010	Panama City, Panama		
January 31 – February 3, 2012	Quito, Ecuador	Carry out an assessment of the forum and its effectiveness; Prepare for the Rio+20 Conference; Address the financial and economic structure of sustainable development initiatives	Adoption of the Quito declaration, which among other things: commits to formulating a regional environmental agenda; forwards key messages to Rio+20; and sets out common positions on climate issues, technology transfer and commodity prices, among others; Adoption of ten decisions prepared and recommended by a Preparatory Meeting of High-Level Experts regarding: governance; sustainable consumption and production (SCP); environmental indicators; the Regional Financial Strategy (EFIR); air pollution; chemicals, and hazardous and other wastes; landlocked countries; small island developing States (SIDS); environmental education; and the Central American and Caribbean countries
March 11–13, 2014	Los Cabos, Mexico	Foster cooperation on climate change, biodiversity, sustainable development, and reduction/management of chemical and solid waste	
March 28–31, 2016	Cartagena, Colombia	Discussion of sustainable development, health and the environment, biodiversity; Implementation of Paris Agreement in the region.	Adoption of the Cartagena Declaration, which among other things: calls for the update of the Latin American and the Caribbean Initiative for Sustainable Development (ILAC, champions the enforcement of concepts such as Sustainable consumption and production and Environmental education, and declares the establishment of a Regional Platform on Climate Change and a Regional Plan of Action on Atmospheric Pollution
October 9–12, 2018	Buenos Aires, Argentina	Pollution mitigation and prevention; Decarbonization of the economy; Limitation of natural resource extraction and usage; Discussion of implementation of UN Sustainable Development Goals	
February 1–2, 2021	Online, organized by the government of Barbados*	Integration of environmental issues to be placed at the heart of the region’s COVID-19 recovery strategies; Opportunities for green recovery; Conservation and sustainable use of natural resources	Signment of the Bridgetown Declaration; Agreement upon eight decisions to be presented at the fifth session of the United Nations Environment Assembly.
24 - 26 October 2023	Panama City, Panama	The agenda will include keynotes, expert panels, interactive sessions and networking opportunities, all of which can be followed through the Forum's YouTube channel; This year, it will be held in parallel with the Latin American and Caribbean Climate Week, organized by the United Nations Framework Convention on Climate Change (UNFCCC), of which UNEP is part of its Secretariat.	To be celebrated

*The event would normally have happened in 2020, however due to the pandemic the event was held in a virtual format for the first time, co-hosted by the Government of Barbados, which was where the event was supposed to take place in the previous year).
