= Conference on Interaction and Confidence-Building Measures in Asia =

Inter-governmental forum

Conference on Interaction and Confidence Building Measures in Asia (CICA)
- Logo

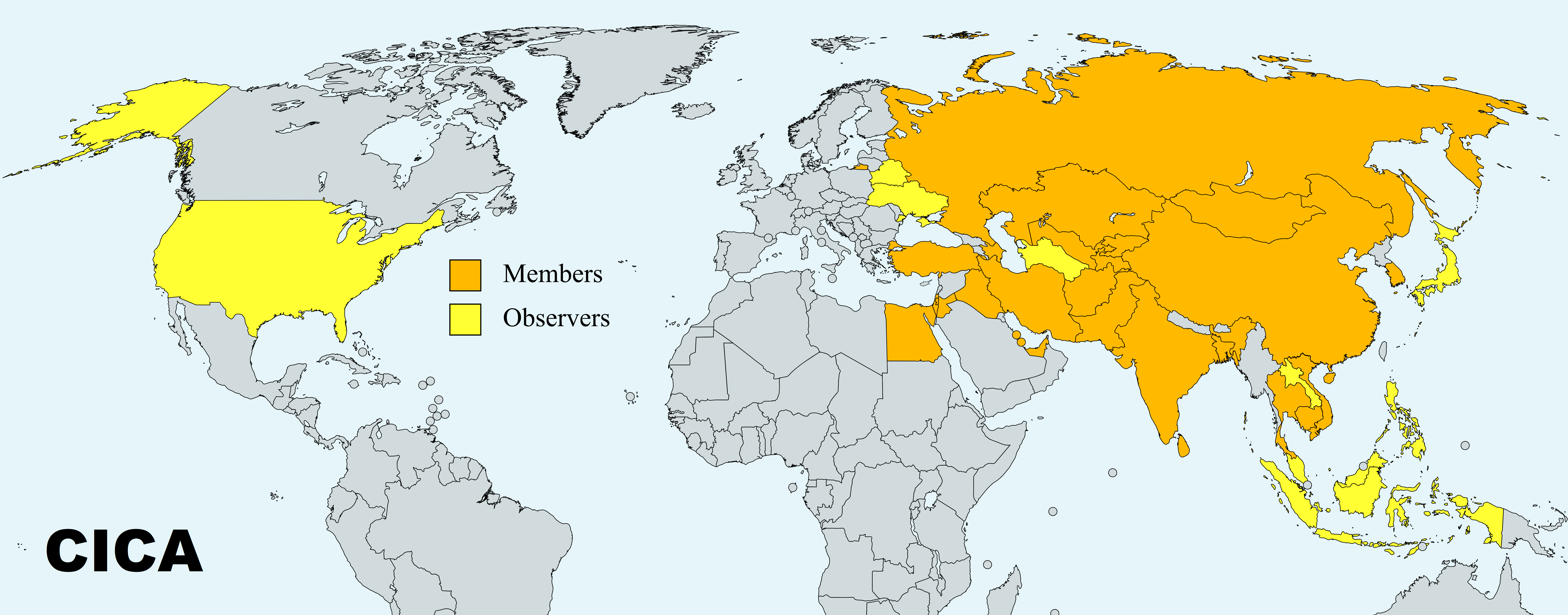
- Secretariat: Astana, Kazakhstan
- Membership: 29 member states; 10 observer states; 5 observer organizations

Leaders
  - Executive Director: (Kazakhstan) Kairat Sarybay
- Establishment: 14 September 1999
- Website www.s-cica.org

The Conference on Interaction and Confidence-Building Measures in Asia (CICA) is an inter-governmental forum for enhancing cooperation towards promoting peace, security and stability in Asia. It is a forum based on the recognition that there is a close link between peace, security and stability in Asia and in the rest of the world. The key idea of the Conference is based on the priority of the indivisibility of security, joint initiative and mutually beneficial interaction of small and large states.

The idea of convening the CICA was first proposed by Kazakhstan President Nursultan Nazarbayev on 5 October 1992, at the 47th Session of the United Nations General Assembly. On October 5, 2017, the CICA process celebrated its 25th anniversary.

== Background ==
The proposal for convening the CICA was welcomed by a number of Asian countries. During the next seven years, a series of meetings were held among the interested countries to discuss modalities of convening the CICA and draft basic documents.

The first meeting of the CICA Ministers of Foreign Affairs was held on 14 September 1999 with participation of 15 Member States. The Declaration on Principles Guiding Relations between CICA Member States was adopted at this meeting.

The first CICA summit was held on 4 June 2002 with participation of 16 Member States and Almaty Act, the charter of the CICA, was adopted. The impetus for this meeting came from the 9-11 terrorist attacks of the previous year. Thus, counter-terrorism became an important issue for CICA, and this theme has run through the subsequent meetings.

At the second meeting of the Ministers of Foreign Affairs in 2004, CICA Catalogue of Confidence-Building Measures and CICA Rules of Procedures were adopted. At the second CICA Summit in 2006, it was decided to admit Thailand and Republic of Korea as new members and to establish a permanent secretariat. At the third meeting of Ministers of Foreign Affairs in 2008, Jordan and UAE were admitted as new members. At the third CICA Summit in 2010, Turkey assumed Chairmanship of CICA from the founding Chairman Kazakhstan. The third Summit also admitted Iraq and Vietnam as new members and adopted the CICA Convention. Bahrain and Cambodia joined CICA in 2011, Bangladesh and Qatar joined in 2014, Sri Lanka in 2018 and Kuwait in 2022. Laos joined CICA in 2026.

On 9–10 September 2026, the Conference of Heads of Ports of the CICA Member States was held in Baku, where a decision was made to establish a Council on Sustainable Connectivity for the Development of Transport and Trade.

== Membership ==
Member states (29)

- Afghanistan
- Azerbaijan
- Bahrain
- Bangladesh
- Cambodia
- China
- Egypt
- India
- Iran
- Iraq
- Israel
- Jordan
- Kazakhstan
- Kuwait
- Kyrgyzstan
- Laos
- Mongolia
- Pakistan
- Palestine
- Qatar
- Russia
- Republic of Korea
- Sri Lanka
- Tajikistan
- Thailand
- Turkey
- United Arab Emirates
- Uzbekistan
- Vietnam

Observer states (9)

- Belarus
- Indonesia
- Japan
- Malaysia
- Philippines
- Saudi Arabia
- Turkmenistan
- Ukraine
- United States

Observer organizations (5)

- International Organization for Migration
- League of Arab States
- Organization for Security and Co-operation in Europe
- Parliamentary Assembly of Turkic Speaking Countries
- United Nations

Partner Organizations (6)

- Assembly of People of Kazakhstan
- Economic Cooperation Organization
- Shanghai Cooperation Organisation
- Regional Anti-Terrorist Structure of the Shanghai Cooperation Organisation
- United Nations Office on Drugs and Crime
- Eurasian Economic Union

== Chairmanship ==
- Kazakhstan (2002–2010)
- Turkey (2010–2014)
- China (2014–2018)
- Tajikistan (2018–2020)
- Kazakhstan (2020–2024)
- Azerbaijan (2024–2028)

== Summits ==
=== 2002 Summit ===
The first CICA summit was held in Almaty on June 4, 2002. The idea was proposed by Kazakhstan at the end of the Cold War and at the time of shifting geopolitics, provided a timely opportunity for the Asian nations to address modern challenges to the international peace and stability and set out the vision to tackle them.

The original 16 nations signed the Almaty Act, the Charter of the CICA and pledging to work "towards promoting peace, security and stability in Asia".

The Act was signed by Chairman of the Administration of Afghanistan Hamid Karzai, President of China Jiang Zemin, Prime Minister of India Atal Behari Vajpayee, President of Kazakhstan Nursultan Nazarbayev, President of Kyrgyzstan Askar Akayev, President of Mongolia Natsagiin Bagabandi, President of Pakistan Pervez Musharraf, President of Russia Vladimir Putin, President of Turkey Ahmet Necdet Sezer, and President of Tajikistan Emomali Rahmon. Signatories from other CICA members included the prime ministers of Azerbaijan and Uzbekistan, a deputy prime minister of Israel, as well as special high-level envoys from Egypt, Iran, and Palestine.

Ten more nations, including the United States, were accorded observer status in the new forum, as also a number of international organizations, such as the UN, the OSCE and the Arab League.

In the final Almaty Act, the 16 leaders said that the CICA process presents "new opportunities for cooperation, peace and security in Asia" and "will guide us towards a better future, which our peoples deserve". They declared their "determination to form in Asia a common and indivisible area of security, where all states peacefully coexist, and their peoples live in conditions of peace, freedom and prosperity, and confident that peace, security and development complement, sustain and reinforce each other."

The leaders agreed to hold summits every four years, while the foreign ministers are to meet every two years. There are also provisions allowing for special meetings and summits to be convened at the consensus at other times. The committee of senior officials will keep up the organizational work and will meet annually.

In another major development, the leaders adopted the CICA Declaration on Eliminating Terrorism and Promoting Dialogue among Civilizations, condemning "all forms and manifestations of terrorism, committed no matter when, where or by whom," and declaring their commitment to cooperation with each other and other nations in combating terrorism.

=== 2006 Summit ===
The second CICA summit was held in Almaty on June 17, 2006 with participation of the Heads of State/Government of Afghanistan, Azerbaijan, China, Kazakhstan, Kyrgyzstan, Pakistan, Russia, Tajikistan, Thailand and Uzbekistan and Special Envoys of the Heads of State/Government of Egypt, India, Iran, Israel, Mongolia, Palestine, Turkey and Republic of Korea which was admitted as the eighteenth member of CICA.

The Second Summit adopted the Statute of CICA Secretariat and Declaration of the Second CICA Summit. The Declaration of the Second CICA Summit reflected the general view of the member states on key problems of security and cooperation in Asia and in other parts of the world. The Declaration also reiterated the desire of the member states to continue the efforts to move forward CICA process to achieve its shared objectives; and noted with satisfaction that the establishment of CICA Secretariat in the territory of the Republic of Kazakhstan was an important milestone in the evolution of CICA process. It was also decided to mark October 5 as CICA Day to commemorate the initiation of the proposal for convening the Conference on Interaction and Confidence-Building Measures in Asia by H.E. Mr. Nursultan Nazarbayev, President of the Republic of Kazakhstan at the 47th Session of the United Nations General Assembly in 1992.

=== 2010 Summit ===
The third CICA Summit was held in Istanbul, Turkey on 8 June 2010 with participation of the Heads of State/Government of Afghanistan, Azerbaijan, Iran, Kazakhstan, Mongolia, Russia and Turkey; Deputy Heads of State/Government of Iraq and Vietnam; and Special Envoys of China, Egypt, India, Israel, Jordan, Kyrgyzstan, Republic of Korea, Pakistan, Palestine, Tajikistan, Thailand and United Arab Emirates. Uzbekistan was the only member state that was not represented at the Summit. For the first time in the short history of CICA, Chairmanship passed from Kazakhstan to Turkey. Iraq and Vietnam were admitted as new members of CICA taking the membership to twenty two. Bangladesh was accorded the status of observer.

Summit adopted the declaration: "Constructing Cooperative Approach to Interaction and Security in Asia and Convention on the Privileges and Immunities of the Secretariat, its Personnel and Representatives of Members of the Conference on Interaction and Confidence-Building Measures in Asia."

The declaration reflected CICA's stand and views on important issues of security and cooperation in Asia and other parts of the world including terrorism, disarmament, illicit drugs, the 2008 financial crisis, environment as well as situation in Afghanistan and Middle East. The declaration also reiterated commitment of the member states to carry forward the CICA process and reaffirmed the importance of initiating deliberations on security issues in accordance with the provisions of the CICA Catalogue of CBMs.

Turkish President Abdullah Gul mentioned in his concluding statement that during the summit, Israel was condemned by all members save itself for its 2010 Gaza flotilla raid. He also mentioned that Israel was isolated and "[would] suffer the consequences of its mistake."

=== 2014 Summit ===
The Fourth CICA Summit, presided by H.E. Mr. Xi Jinping, paramount leader of China, was held in Shanghai on 21 May 2014 with participation of twenty six member states, eleven observer states and international organizations, two partner international organizations, and eight guest states and international organizations. The Republic of Turkey passed on the CICA Chairmanship to the People's Republic of China for the period 2014-16. The People's Republic of China became the third Chairman of CICA after the Republic of Kazakhstan and the Republic of Turkey.

The 2014 summit saw the most participation of heads of state of any summit thus far, seeing a total of 13 heads of state attending. The summit saw Bangladesh and the Qatar admitted as new members of CICA.

On the eve of the Summit, Chinese leader Xi Jinping hosted a banquet and gala evening, with the theme “United and Harmonious Asian Countries move together towards future”, for the participants.

At the Summit, participating leaders expressed their views on topics such as security situation in Asia and measures to promote CICA dialogue, trust and coordination. In his keynote address, Chinese leader Xi Jinping presented a new regional security cooperation architecture respecting and ensuring the security of each and every country and jointly building a road for security of Asia that is shared by all in a win-win situation. Xi announced the New Asian Security Concept. Implying that Asian countries can handle their security without the involvement of the United States, the core of the New Asian Security Concept is that "Asian issues should be taken care of by Asians, and Asian security should be maintained by Asians."

The Summit adopted a declaration espousing its theme "On Enhancing Dialogue, Trust and Coordination for a New Asia of Peace, Stability and Cooperation". The declaration reflected CICA's stand and views on important issues of security and cooperation in Asia including terrorism, disarmament, illicit drugs, organized transnational crime, food and energy security, human rights, information and communication technology, environment as well as situation in Afghanistan and Middle East. The declaration also reiterated commitment of the member states to carry forward the CICA process and reaffirmed the importance of implementing agreed confidence building measures in all dimensions. The Summit also welcomed adoption of the new CICA Rules of Procedure.

A memorandum of understanding between the CICA Secretariat and the SCO Secretariat was signed on the sidelines of the CICA Shanghai Summit.

Summit also adopted revised CICA Rules of Procedure.

=== 2019 Summit ===
The Fifth CICA Summit, presided by Emomali Rahmon, President of the Republic of Tajikistan, was held in Dushanbe on 15 June 2019. The Fifth Summit gathered the largest ever participation by the Heads of State and Government. Fifteen Heads of State and Government participated in the Summit besides other high level dignitaries including Vice-President, Ministers of Foreign Affairs and Ambassadors.

=== 2022 Summit ===
The Sixth CICA Summit, presided by Kassym-Jomart Tokayev, President of Kazakhstan, was held in Astana on 12–13 October 2022.

== Ministerial meetings ==
=== 1999 Ministerial meeting ===
The first meeting of CICA Ministers of Foreign Affairs was held in Almaty on September 14, 1999 with participation of fifteen member states: Afghanistan, Azerbaijan, China, Egypt, India, Iran, Israel, Kazakhstan, Kyrgyzstan, Pakistan, Palestine, Russia, Tajikistan, Turkey and Uzbekistan. Representatives of the then Observer States: USA, Japan, Indonesia, Republic of Korea, Malaysia, Mongolia, Ukraine, and International Organizations like UN and Organization for Security and Co-operation in Europe (OSCE) also participated in the meeting.

The First Ministerial Meeting laid the foundation of CICA with the signing of the Declaration on Principles Guiding Relations between CICA Member States by the Ministers. The Ministers, while reaffirming commitment to the United Nations Charter, agreed that the Member states will respect each other's sovereign equality; refrain from the threat or use of force; respect the territorial integrity of each other; settle disputes in accordance with the Declaration, UN Charter and international law; refrain from any intervention in the internal affairs of each other; reaffirm their commitment to the goal of achieving general and complete disarmament under effective control; enhance the process of economic, social and cultural cooperation; and respect human rights and fundamental freedoms of all individuals.

=== 2004 Ministerial meeting ===
The second meeting of CICA Ministers of Foreign Affairs was held in Almaty on October 22, 2004. At this meeting, CICA Catalogue of Confidence-Building Measures (CBMs), CICA Rules of Procedure and Declaration of CICA Ministerial Meeting were adopted. Thailand was admitted as the seventeenth member of CICA.

CICA Rules of Procedure laid down ground rules for decision making, member ship, observer status, chairmanship, types of meetings and procedure for conducting meetings. One of the most important aspects of the Rules of Procedure is that decisions and recommendations at all levels are taken by consensus. Rules of Procedure were amended by a decision adopted on September 1, 2009. With this amendment, period of Chairmanship was reduced from four years to two years. It was also decided that the member state hosting regular Summit would be Chairman till the next regular meeting of Ministers of Foreign Affairs. The member state hosting the regular meeting of Ministers of Foreign Affairs would be Chairman till the next regular Summit. Declaration of the Second Ministerial Meeting included assessment of the situation at that time at the regional and global levels including Afghanistan, Iraq, Middle East, South Caucasus, and Korean peninsula. Member states once again condemned terrorism in all forms and manifestations and reiterated their commitment to fight this menace.

=== 2012 Ministerial Meeting ===
The Fourth Meeting of CICA Ministers of Foreign Affairs was held in Astana, Republic of Kazakhstan on 12 September 2012 with participation of ministers and their special envoys. The meeting was jointly presided by Ministers of Foreign Affairs of Turkey and Kazakhstan, representing CICA Chairmanship and the host country. Ministerial Meeting was preceded by a commemorative session celebrating twentieth anniversary of CICA, which was addressed by President Nursultan Nazarbayev of Kazakhstan. A comprehensive declaration adopted by the ministers reaffirmed CICA's stand and views on important issues of security and cooperation in Asia and other parts of the world including terrorism, disarmament, illicit drugs, energy security, environment as well as situation in Afghanistan and Middle East. The declaration also encouraged Member States to initiate implementation of confidence-building measures in military-political dimension. Ministers agreed to initiate steps to develop CICA Action Plan for implementation of the UN Global Counter-terrorism Strategy; constitute a CICA Business Council; explore opportunities of developing road and railway links in the CICA region; and finalise the revised rules of procedure.

=== Ministerial 2017 Marking 25th Anniversary ===
The informal ministerial marking the 25th anniversary of the CICA was held on September 20, 2017 on the sidelines of the 72nd UN General Assembly. Kazakshtan's Foreign Minister Kairat Abdrakhmanov recognized Ambassador Gong Jianwei, Executive Director of CICA Secretariat, with a medal honoring the 25th anniversary of Kazakhstan's diplomatic service corps.

== See also ==
- Asia Cooperation Dialogue
- Shanghai Cooperation Organisation
- Asia–Europe Meeting
