= International organization =

Organization established by treaty between governments

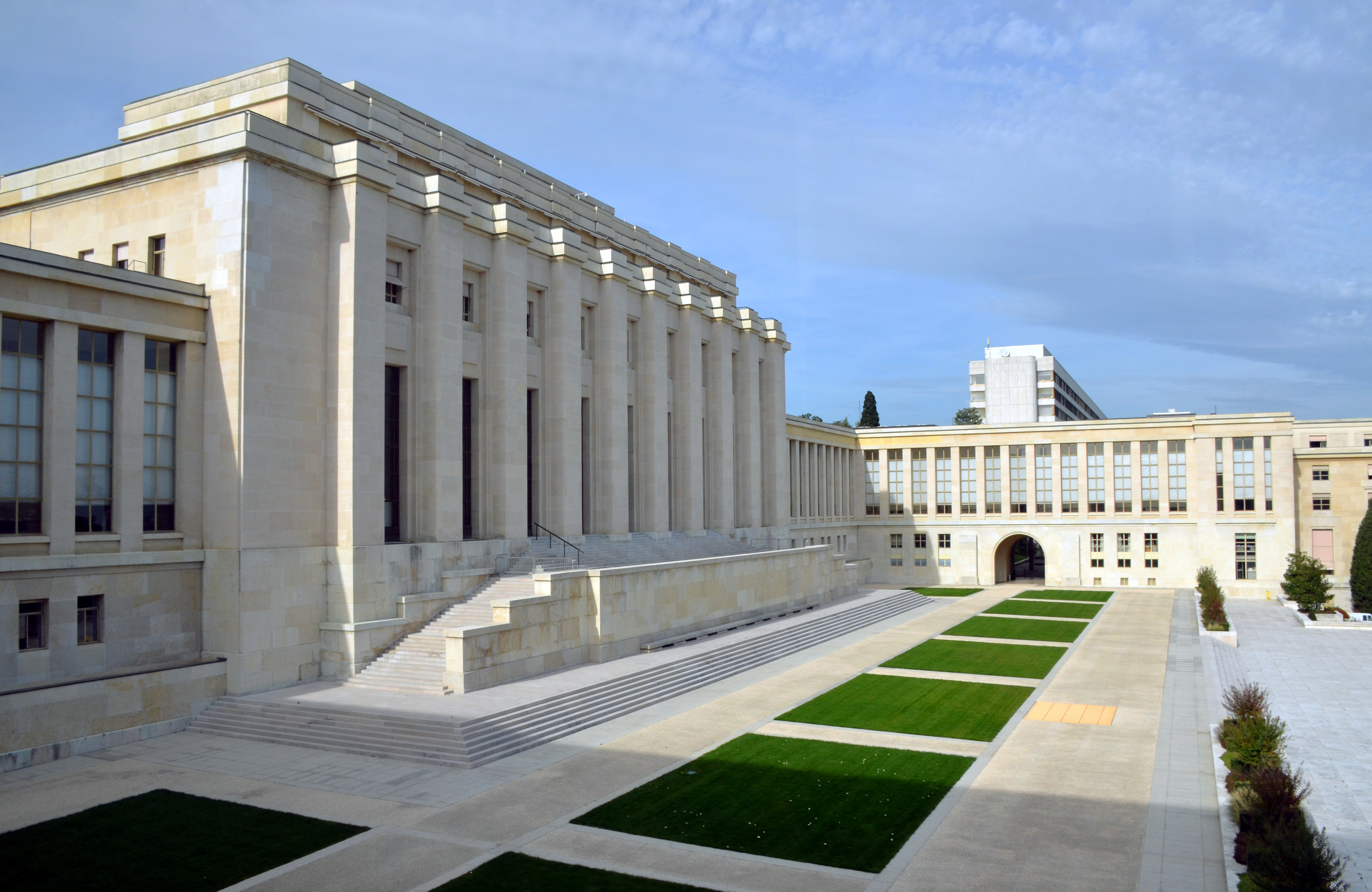
The offices of the United Nations in Geneva (Switzerland), which is the city that hosts the highest number of international organizations in the world

An international organization, also known as an international institution or intergovernmental organization (IGO), is an association of states established by a treaty or other type of instrument governed by international law to pursue the common aim of its member states. An IGO possesses its own legal personality separate from its member states and can enter into legally binding agreements with other IGOs or with other states. The United Nations (UN), the Council of Europe, the African Union, the Organization of American States (OAS), the North Atlantic Treaty Organization (NATO), Mercosur, and BRICS are examples of IGOs. International organizations are composed of primarily member states, but may also include other entities, such as other international organizations, commercial firms, and nongovernmental organizations. Additionally, entities may hold observer status. Under international law, although treaties are typically between states, intergovernmental organizations also have the capacity to enter into treaties. The traditional view was that only states were subjects of international law, but with the founding of the United Nations, that view expanded to include intergovernmental organizations.

Within the international relations literature, international organizations facilitate cooperation between states by reducing transaction costs, providing information, making commitments more credible, establishing focal points for coordination, facilitating the principle of reciprocity, extending the shadow of the future, and enabling interlinkages of issues, which raises the cost of noncompliance. States may comply with the decisions of international organizations, even when they do not want to, for rational cost-benefit calculations (to reap concrete rewards of future cooperation and avoid punishment) and normative reasons (social learning and socialization).

International organizations vary in terms of: inclusive or exclusive membership; broad or narrow scope; equal or unequal control by members; precision and flexibility of rules; hard or soft obligations; and delegation of power to the international organization. Other examples of international organizations include the UN General Assembly, the World Trade Organization, the African Development Bank, the UN Economic and Social Council, the UN Security Council, the Asian Development Bank, the International Bank for Reconstruction and Development, the International Monetary Fund, the International Finance Corporation, the Inter-American Development Bank, and the United Nations Environment Programme.

== Terminology ==
Scottish law professor James Lorimer is credited with coining the term "international organization" in an 1871 article in the Revue de Droit International et de Legislation Compare. Lorimer used the term frequently in his 2-volume Institutes of the Law of Nations (1883, 1884). Other early uses of the term were by law professor Walther Schucking in works published in 1907, 1908 and 1909, and by political science professor Paul S. Reinsch in 1911. In 1935, Pitman B. Potter defined international organization as "an association or union of nations established or recognized by them for the purpose of realizing a common end". He distinguished between bilateral and multilateral organizations on one end and customary or conventional organizations on the other end. In his 1922 book An Introduction to the Study of International Organization, Potter argued that international organization was distinct from "international intercourse" (all relations between states), "international law" (which lacks enforcement) and world government.

International Organizations are sometimes referred to as intergovernmental organizations (IGOs), to clarify the distinction from international non-governmental organizations (INGOs), which are non-governmental organizations (NGOs) that operate internationally. These include international nonprofit organizations such as the World Organization of the Scout Movement, International Committee of the Red Cross (ICRC), and Médecins Sans Frontières, as well as lobby groups that represent the interests of multinational corporations.

IGOs are established by a treaty that acts as a charter creating the group. Treaties are formed when lawful representatives (governments) of several states go through a ratification process, providing the IGO with an international legal personality. Intergovernmental organizations are an important aspect of public international law.

Intergovernmental organizations in a legal sense should be distinguished from simple groupings or coalitions of states, such as the G7 or the Quartet. Such groups or associations have not been founded by a constituent document and exist only as task groups. Intergovernmental organizations must also be distinguished from treaties. Many treaties (such as the North American Free Trade Agreement, or the General Agreement on Tariffs and Trade before the establishment of the World Trade Organization) do not establish an independent secretariat and instead rely on the parties for their administration, for example by setting up a joint committee. Other treaties have established an administrative apparatus which was not deemed to have been granted binding legal authority. The broader concept wherein relations among three or more states are organized according to certain principles they hold in common is multilateralism.

== History ==
An early prominent example of an international organization is the Congress of Vienna of 1814–1815, which was an international diplomatic conference to reconstitute the European political order after the downfall of the French Emperor Napoleon. States then became the main decision makers who preferred to maintain their sovereignty as of 1648 at the Westphalian treaty that closed the Thirty Years' War in Europe.

The Central Commission for Navigation on the Rhine, founded in 1815, is the world's oldest international organization still in operation. The oldest international organization established employing a treaty and creating a permanent secretariat with a global membership was the International Telecommunication Union, founded in 1865. The Universal Postal Union, established in 1874 as the General Postal Union, is the third oldest extant international organization. The first general international organization—addressing a variety of issues—was the League of Nations, founded on 10 January 1920 with a principal mission of maintaining world peace after the First World War. The United Nations followed this model after Second World War. This was signed on 26 June 1945, in San Francisco, at the conclusion of the United Nations Conference on International Organization, and came into force on 24 October 1945. Currently, the United Nations is the main IGO with its arms such as the Security Council (UNSC), General Assembly (UNGA), International Court of Justice (ICJ), Secretariat (UNSA), Trusteeship Council (UNTC), and Economic and Social Council (ECOSOC).

=== Expansion and growth ===
When defined as "organizations with at least three state parties, a permanent headquarters or secretariat, as well as regular meetings and budgets", the number of IGOs in the world increased from about 60 in 1940 to about 350 in 1980, after which it has remained roughly constant.

== Types and purpose ==
Intergovernmental organizations differ in function, membership, and membership criteria. They have various goals and scopes, sometimes outlined in their treaty or charter. Some IGOs developed to fulfill a need for a neutral forum for debate or negotiation to resolve disputes. Others developed to carry out mutual interests with unified aims to preserve peace through conflict resolution and better international relations, promote international cooperation on matters such as environmental protection, to promote human rights, to promote social development (education, health care), to render humanitarian aid, and to economic development. Some are more general in scope (the United Nations) while others may have subject-specific missions (such as INTERPOL or the International Telecommunication Union and other standards organizations).

Common types of intergovernmental organizations include:

- Worldwide or global organizations: Generally open to nations worldwide as long as certain criteria are met. This category includes the United Nations and its specialized agencies, World Health Organization, International Telecommunication Union, World Bank, and International Monetary Fund. It also includes globally operating intergovernmental organizations that are not an agency of the UN, including for example: the Hague Conference on Private International Law, an operating intergovernmental organization based in The Hague that pursues the progressive unification of private international law; the International Criminal Court that adjudicates crimes defined under the Rome Statute; and the CGIAR (formerly the Consultative Group for International Agricultural Research), a global partnership that unites intergovernmental organizations engaged in research for a food-secured future.
- Cultural, linguistic, ethnic, religious or historical organizations: Open to members based on some cultural, linguistic, ethnic, religious or historical link. Examples include the Commonwealth of Nations, Arab League, Organisation internationale de la Francophonie, Community of Portuguese Language Countries, Organization of Turkic States, International Organization of Turkic Culture, Organisation of Islamic Cooperation, and Commonwealth of Independent States (CIS).
- Economic organizations: Based on macro-economic policy goals. Some are dedicated to free trade and reduction of trade barriers, e.g. World Trade Organization, International Monetary Fund. Others are focused on international development. International cartels, such as OPEC, also exist. The Organisation for Economic Co-operation and Development (OECD) was founded as an economic-policy-focused organization. An example of a recently formed economic IGO is the Bank of the South.
- Educational organizations: Centered around tertiary-level study. EUCLID University was chartered as a university and umbrella organization dedicated to sustainable development in signatory countries. The United Nations has founded multiple universities, notably the United Nations University and the University for Peace, for research and education around issues relevant to the UN, such as peace and sustainable development. The United Nations also has a dedicated training arm: the United Nations Institute for Training and Research (UNITAR).
- Health and population organizations: Based on common perceived health and population goals. These are formed to address those challenges collectively, for example, the intergovernmental partnership for population and development Partners in Population and Development.
- Regional organizations: Open to members from a particular continent or other specific region of the world. This category includes the Community of Latin American and Caribbean States (CLACS), Council of Europe (CoE), European Union (EU), Eurasian Economic Union (EAEU), Energy Community, North Atlantic Treaty Organization (NATO), Economic Community of West African States (ECOWAS), Organization for Security and Co-operation in Europe (OSCE), African Union (AU), Organization of American States (OAS), Association of Caribbean States (ACS), Association of Southeast Asian Nations (ASEAN), Islamic Development Bank, Union of South American Nations, Asia Cooperation Dialogue (ACD), Pacific Islands Forum, South Asian Association for Regional Cooperation (SAARC), Asian-African Legal Consultative Organization (AALCO) and the Organisation of Eastern Caribbean States (OECS).

=== Regional organizations ===
In regional organizations like the European Union, African Union, Indian Ocean Rim Association, NATO, ASEAN, Mercosur, Andean Community and the Organization of American States, there are restrictions on membership due to factors such as geography or political regimes. To enter the European Union (EU), the states require different criteria; member states need to be European, liberal-democratic political system, and be a capitalist economy.

The oldest regional organization is the Central Commission for Navigation on the Rhine, created in 1815 by the Congress of Vienna.

== Participation and involvement ==
There are several reasons a state may choose membership in an intergovernmental organization. But there are also reasons membership may be rejected.

Reasons for participation:

- Economic rewards: in the case of the North American Free Trade Agreement (NAFTA), membership in the free trade agreement benefits the parties' economies. For example, Mexican companies are given better access to U.S. markets due to their membership. External actors can also contribute to economic rewards and fuel the attractiveness of IGOs – notably for developing countries. For example, external donor funding from the European Union to IGOs in the Global South.
- Political influence: smaller countries, such as Portugal and Belgium, who do not carry much political clout on the international stage, are given a substantial increase in influence through membership in IGOs such as the European Union. Also for countries with more influence such as France and Germany, IGOs are beneficial as the nation increases influence in the smaller countries' internal affairs and expanding other nations dependence on themselves, so to preserve allegiance.
- Security: membership in an IGO such as NATO gives security benefits to member countries. This provides an arena where political differences can be resolved.
- Democracy: it has been noted that member countries experience a greater degree of democracy and those democracies survive longer.

Reasons for rejecting membership:

- Loss of sovereignty: membership often comes with a loss of state sovereignty as treaties are signed that require co-operation on the part of all member states.
- Insufficient benefits: often membership does not bring about substantial enough benefit to warrant membership in the organization.
- Attractive external options: bilateral co-operation with external actors or competing IGOs may provide more attractive (external) policy options for member states. Thus, powerful external actors may undermine existing IGOs.

Member states of international organizations may threaten to withdraw from international organizations, often as a way to renegotiate the institutional arrangements. One study found 145 withdrawal threats over the period 1980-2022 and that 91% of those threats to withdraw were never carried out.

== Privileges and immunities ==
Intergovernmental organizations are provided with privileges and immunities that are intended to ensure their independent and effective functioning. They are specified in the treaties that give rise to the organization (such as the Convention on the Privileges and Immunities of the United Nations and the Agreement on the Privileges and Immunities of the International Criminal Court), which are normally supplemented by further multinational agreements and national regulations (for example the International Organizations Immunities Act in the United States). The organizations are thereby immune from the jurisdiction of national courts. Certain privileges and immunities are also specified in the Vienna Convention on the Representation of States in their Relations with International Organizations of a Universal Character of 1975 – which however has so far not been signed by 35 states and is thus not yet in force (status: 2022).

Rather than by national jurisdiction, legal accountability is intended to be ensured by legal mechanisms that are internal to the intergovernmental organization itself and access to administrative tribunals. In the course of many court cases where private parties tried to pursue claims against international organizations, there has been a gradual realization that alternative means of dispute settlement are required as states have fundamental human rights obligations to provide plaintiffs with access to court in view of their right to a fair trial. Otherwise, the organizations' immunities may be put in question in national and international courts. Some organizations hold proceedings before tribunals relating to their organization to be confidential, and in some instances have threatened disciplinary action should an employee disclose any of the relevant information. Such confidentiality has been criticized as a lack of transparency.

The immunities also extend to employment law. In this regard, immunity from national jurisdiction necessitates that reasonable alternative means are available to effectively protect employees' rights; in this context, a first instance Dutch court considered an estimated duration of proceedings before the Administrative Tribunal of the International Labour Organization of 15 years to be too long. An international organization does not pay taxes, is difficult to prosecute in court and is not obliged to provide information to any parliament.

== United Nations agencies and related organizations ==
The United Nations focuses on five main areas: "maintaining peace and security, protecting human rights, delivering humanitarian aid, supporting sustainable development, and upholding international law". UN agencies, such as UN Relief and Works Agency, are generally regarded as international organizations in their own right. Additionally, the United Nations has Specialized Agencies, which are organizations within the United Nations System that have their member states (often nearly identical to the UN Member States) and are governed independently by them; examples include international organizations that predate the UN, such as the International Telecommunication Union, and the Universal Postal Union, as well as organizations that were created after the UN such as the World Health Organization (which was made up of regional organizations such as PAHO that predated the UN). A few UN special agencies are very centralized in policy and decision-making, but some are decentralized; for example, the country-based projects or missions' directors and managers can decide what they want to do in the fields.

The UN agencies have a variety of tasks based on their specialization and their interests. The UN agencies provide different kinds of assistance to low-income countries and middle-income countries, and this assistance would be a good resource for developmental projects in developing countries. The UN has to protect against any kind of human rights violation, and in the UN system, some specialized agencies, like ILO and United Nations High Commissioner for Refugees (UNHCR), work in the human rights' protection fields. The UN agency, ILO, is trying to end any kind of discrimination in the work field and child labor; after that, this agency promotes fundamental labor rights and to get safe and secure for the laborers. United Nations Environment Programme (UNEP) is one of the UN's (United Nations) agencies and is an international organization that coordinates UN activities on the environment.

== See also ==
- Intergovernmentalism
- International financial institutions
- International organisations in Europe
- International relations
- International trade
  - Index of international trade topics
- List of intergovernmental organizations
- List of organizations with .int domain names
- List of regional organizations by population
- List of supranational environmental agencies
- List of trade blocs
- Multilateralism
- Non-aggression pact
- Regional Economic Communities
- Regional integration
- Regional organization
- Supranational aspects of international organizations
- Supranational union
- Trade bloc
- United Nations
- World government
