= Central Asian Cooperation Organization =

The Central Asian Cooperation Organization (CACO) (Russian: Центрально-Азиатское сотрудничество (ЦАС)) was a regional international organization uniting several former Soviet republics of Central Asia. It operated under this name from 2002 to 2005 and was dissolved following its merger with the Eurasian Economic Community.

== History ==
Kazakhstan, Kyrgyzstan, Tajikistan, Turkmenistan and Uzbekistan formed the OCAC in 1991 as the Central Asian Commonwealth (CAC). On 30 April 1994, Kazakhstan, Kyrgyzstan, and Uzbekistan signed the Treaty on the Establishment of a Single Economic Space, laying the foundation for the Central Asian Union. In March 1998, Tajikistan joined the organization, which in July 1998 was reorganized into the Central Asian Economic Community (CAEC).

In June 2000, at a meeting in Dushanbe, the President of Kazakhstan, Nursultan Nazarbayev, proposed completing work on an agreement to establish an International Water and Energy Consortium aimed at the rational joint use of water resources of transboundary rivers.

The Treaty establishing the Central Asian Cooperation Organization was signed on 28 February 2002 in Almaty. Four of the five Central Asian states—Kazakhstan, Kyrgyzstan, Tajikistan, and Uzbekistan—became founding members; Turkmenistan did not participate. CACO was formed through the transformation of the Central Asian Economic Community. Its declared objectives included cooperation in political, economic, scientific and technical, environmental, and cultural-humanitarian fields; mutual assistance in safeguarding the independence, sovereignty, and territorial integrity of member states; the coordination of border and customs policies; and the gradual formation of a single economic space.

On 5–6 October 2002, a joint meeting of the heads of CACO member states and the International Fund for Saving the Aral Sea was held in Dushanbe. The leaders discussed issues related to the Aral Sea and adopted the Dushanbe Declaration, which outlined a set of measures to address the socio-economic, environmental, and other challenges associated with the declining water level of the sea.

A summit of CACO member states took place on 27 December 2002 in Astana, focusing on regional security, economic integration, and cooperation within international organizations. Representatives of Russia, Ukraine, and Turkey attended the meeting as observers.

On 5 July 2003, the heads of CACO member states met in Almaty. Discussions centered on the implementation of regional water-energy projects, the development of transport and communication infrastructure, food security in the region, and the strengthening of cooperation in combating terrorism, extremism, and illicit drug trafficking.

The meeting of the Council of Heads of State of CACO was held on 28–29 May 2004 in Astana, where a unanimous decision was adopted to admit Russia to the organization. Subsequently, on 18 October 2004, at the CACO summit in Dushanbe, the President of Russia, Vladimir Putin, signed the protocol on Russia’s accession. The summit confirmed Russia’s leading role as a key investment donor and mediator in conflict resolution. Russia’s invitation to join CACO was initiated by the President of Uzbekistan, Islam Karimov. At the same summit, President Nazarbayev proposed the creation of a Central Asian common market.

On 6 October 2005, at a CACO summit held in Saint Petersburg, a decision was adopted to merge the organization with the Eurasian Economic Community. The initiative was put forward by the Presidents of Kazakhstan and Uzbekistan. President Nazarbayev emphasized that the merger would significantly reduce overlapping functions and financial costs while serving the interests of all participating states. President Vladimir Putin noted that the decision had also been coordinated with Belarus another member of the Eurasian Economic Community.

== See also ==
- Commonwealth of Independent States § Organisation of Central Asian Cooperation
- Eurasian Economic Community § History
