= Regional economic communities =

Africa-based international organization

The Regional Economic Communities (RECs) in Africa group together individual countries in subregions for the purposes of achieving greater economic integration. They are described as the "building blocks" of the African Union (AU) and are also central to the strategy for implementing the African Development Development Agency (AUDA-NEPAD). By the African Union These Eight RECs are namely: AMU, CEN-SAD, COMESA, EAC, ECCAS, ECOWAS, IGAD, and SADC.

== List of Regional Economic Communities recognized by the African Union ==
Currently, there are eight RECs recognised by the AU, each established under a separate regional treaty. They are:

- Arab Maghreb Union (AMU)
- Common Market for Eastern and Southern Africa (COMESA)
- Community of Sahel–Saharan States (CEN-SAD)
- East African Community (EAC)
- Economic Community of Central African States (ECCAS)
- Economic Community of West African States (ECOWAS)
- Intergovernmental Authority on Development (IGAD)
- Southern African Development Community (SADC)

== Background ==
From its establishment in 1963, the Organisation of African Unity (OAU) identified the need for the economic integration of the continent as a prerequisite for economic development.

The 1980 Lagos Plan of Action for the Development of Africa, followed by the 1991 treaty to establish the African Economic Community (also referred to as the Abuja Treaty), proposed the creation of regional economic communities (RECs) as the basis for African integration, with a timetable for regional and then continental integration to follow. The Treaty provides for the African Economic Community to be set up through a gradual process, in 6 stages over 34 years, i.e. by 2028.

Article 88 of the Abuja Treaty states that the foundation of the African Economic Community is the progressive integration of the activities of the RECs, with the establishment of full continental economic integration as the final objective towards which the activities of existing and future RECs must be geared. A Protocol on Relations between the AEC and the RECs entered into force on 25 February 1998.

In 2000, the OAU/AEC Summit in Lomé adopted the Constitutive Act of the African Union, which formally replaced the OAU in 2002. The final OAU Summit in Lusaka from 9 to 11 July 2001 reaffirmed the status of the RECs within the African Union and the need for their close involvement in the formulation and implementation of all programmes of the Union.

At the same time, it was recognised that the existing structure of the RECs was far from ideal, with many overlaps in membership. At the Maputo Summit in 2003 the AU Commission was requested to accelerate the preparation of a new draft Protocol on Relations between the African Union and the RECs. Rationalisation of the RECs formed the theme of the July 2006 Banjul summit of the AU. At the July 2007 Accra summit the AU Assembly adopted a Protocol on Relations between the African Union and the Regional Economic Communities. This protocol is intended to facilitate the harmonisation of policies and ensure compliance with the Abuja Treaty and Lagos Plan of Action time frames.

== Challenges facing the RECs ==
Several of the RECs overlap in membership: for example, in East Africa, Kenya and Uganda are members of both the EAC and COMESA, whereas Tanzania, also a member of the EAC, left COMESA and joined SADC in 2001. This multiple and confusing membership creates duplication and sometimes competition in activities, while placing additional burdens on already over-stretched foreign affairs staff to attend all the various summits and other meetings. It evokes a phenomenon called Spaghetti bowl effect.

Moreover, there are additional regional economic cooperation bodies not officially recognised by the African Union as RECs, including:

- Economic and Monetary Community of Central Africa (CEMAC)
- West African Economic and Monetary Union (UEMOA/WAEMU)
- Economic Community of the Great Lakes Countries (CEPGL)
- Indian Ocean Commission (IOC)
- Mano River Union (MRU)
- Southern African Customs Union (SACU)

Other regional cooperation structures not necessarily focused on economic integration also have some overlapping authority, including:

- peace and security agreements, such as the International Conference on the Great Lakes Region (ICGLR/CIRGL); and
- river basin management agreements, such as the Senegal River Basin Development Authority (OMVS).

The internal capability of the RECs varies considerably, with ECOWAS, SADC and EAC the most developed. Moreover, though the RECs are envisaged as the building blocks of the African Union, there is no clear evidence that all existing RECs have the aim of long-term continental integration in view, nor that there is the political will within all the RECs to submit regional concerns to the overriding imperatives of the Union.

== See also ==
- Economic integration
- List of trade blocs

== Links to REC websites ==
=== Recognised by the AU ===
- Arab Maghreb Union (UMA)
- Common Market for Eastern and Southern Africa (COMESA)
- Community of Sahel- Saharan States (CEN-SAD)
- East African Community (EAC)
- Economic Community of Central African States (ECCAS)
- Economic Community of West African States (ECOWAS)
- Intergovernmental Authority on Development (IGAD)
- Southern Africa Development Community (SADC)

=== Others ===
- Economic and Monetary Community of Central Africa
- West African Economic and Monetary Union
- International Conference on The Great Lakes Region
- Indian Ocean Commission
- Mano River Union
- Senegal River Basin Development Authority
- Southern African Customs Union
