= Economy of Africa =

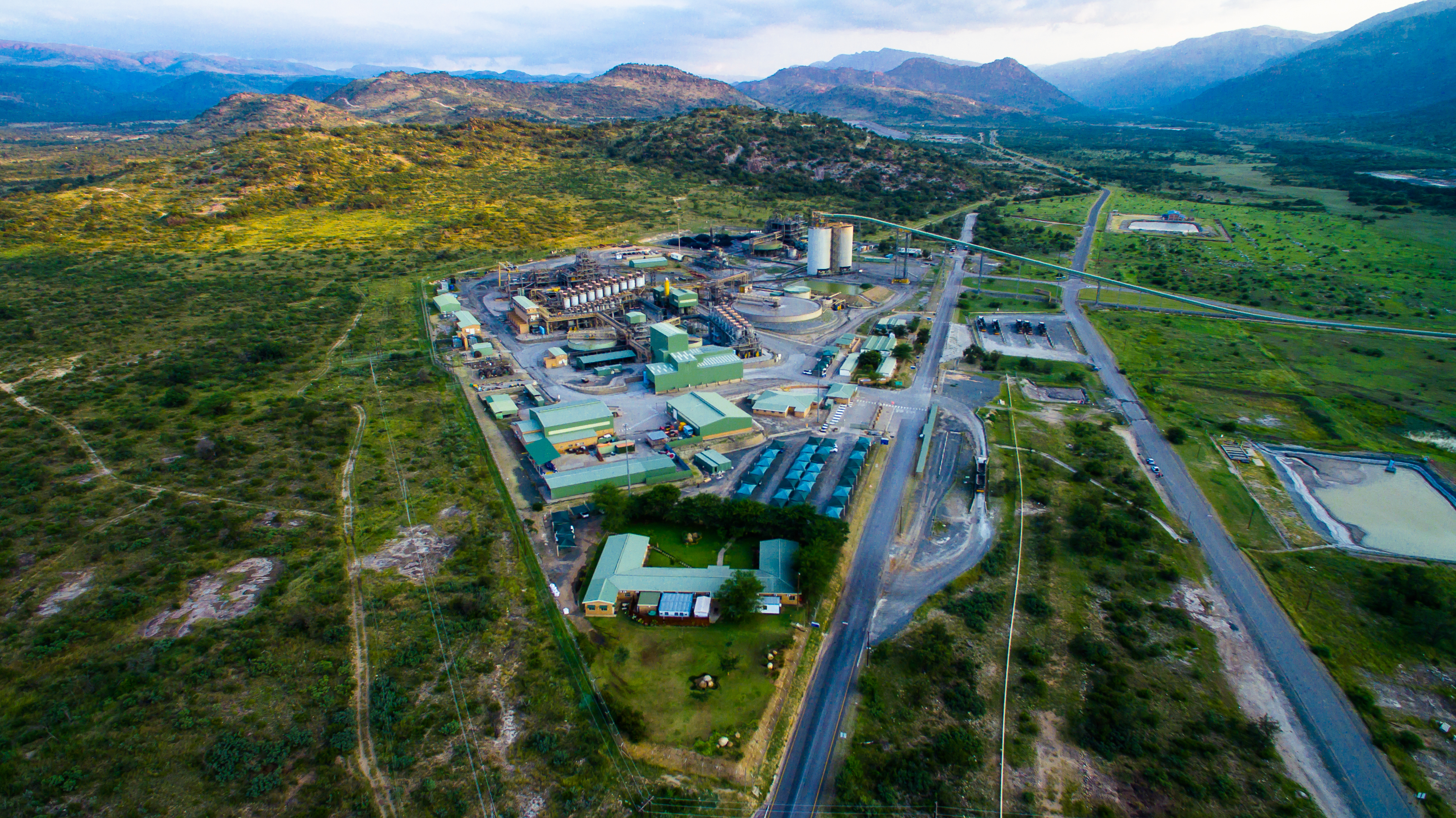
- The continent's largest economy, South Africa, reflects the region's abundant natural resources, fertile land, and emerging technology use.
- Currency: List of currencies in Africa
- Fiscal year: Calendar year
- Trade organisations: AU, AfCFTA, WTO, UN
- Country group: Emerging markets; Developing economies; Least developed countries in certain regions

Statistics
- Population: ▲1.47 billion (2024 estimate)
- GDP: ▲$3.56 trillion (nominal; 2026); ▲$12.52 trillion (PPP; 2026)
- GDP growth: ▲4.2% (2026f); ▲4.3% (2027f); ▲4.4% (2028f)
- GDP per capita: ▲$2,370 (nominal; 2026); ▲$8,330 (PPP; 2026)
- GDP by sector: Agriculture: 20%; Industry: 25%; Services: 55%; (2023 estimate)
- Inflation (CPI): 9.4% (2026)
- Population below national poverty line: Over 33% living below $1.90/day (2024 estimate)
- Gini coefficient: 40.0 (2023 estimate; moderate inequality)
- Human Development Index: 0.546 (medium; 2021)
- Labour force: ▲500 million (2023)
- Unemployment: 7.8% (2023)
- Main industries: Mining; Oil and gas; Agribusiness; Tourism; Textiles; Construction; Telecommunications; Manufacturing

External
- Exports: $720 billion (2023 estimate)
- Export goods: crude oil, gold, diamonds, agricultural products, minerals
- Main export partners: China 15%; European Union 10%; United States 8%; India 7%; UAE 5%; (2023 estimate)
- Imports: $800 billion (2023 estimate)
- Import goods: machinery, electronics, vehicles, food, medical supplies
- Main import partners: China 18%; European Union 14%; India 8%; United States 6%; Turkey 4%; (2023 estimate)
- All values, unless otherwise stated, are in US dollars.

The continent of Africa has a diversified developing economy across the second-largest continental land-mass in the world. It is the world's 5th-largest continental economy with 54 national economies and a large informal economy. With a population of 1.47 billion, the African economy generates $2.83 trillion in nominal gross domestic product (GDP) and over $10 trillion in purchasing power parity (PPP) GDP. It is home to many of the world's fastest-growing economies due to its abundant emerging markets. They are economically integrated within their supranational organization, the African Union (AU).

It is the least wealthy inhabited continent per capita and second-least wealthy by total wealth, ahead of Oceania. Scholars have attributed this to different factors including geography, climate, corruption, as well as colonialism and neocolonialism. Amid this low concentration of wealth, economic expansion and a large youthful population make Africa a large consumer market. Africa has a large quantity of natural resources. The largest sectors of the African economy have been agriculture, trade, and industry. The most developed regions are North Africa, West Africa and Southern Africa.

== History ==
=== Early history ===
Old Kingdom market scene: Two of the customers are seen carrying little boxes on their shoulders, suspected to have contained pieces of metal used as payment.

Precolonial African economies were often based on agriculture, pastoralism, or trade, with the relative scarcity of factors of production (land, labour, and capital) determining their organisation. Common industries included textile manufacturing and metallurgy, although foreign trade is thought to have negated domestic production.

For millennia, Africa's economy has been diverse, driven by extensive trade routes that developed between cities and kingdoms. Some trade routes were overland, some involved navigating rivers, still others developed around port cities. Large African empires became wealthy due to their trade networks, for example Ancient Egypt, Nubia, Mali, Ashanti, the Oyo Empire and Ancient Carthage. Some parts of Africa had close trade relationships with Arab kingdoms, and by the time of the Ottoman Empire, Africans had begun converting to Islam in large numbers. This development, along with the economic potential in finding a trade route to the Indian Ocean, brought the Portuguese to sub-Saharan Africa as an imperial force. Colonial interests created new industries to feed European appetites for goods such as palm oil, rubber, cotton, precious metals, spices, cash crops other goods, and integrated especially the coastal areas with the Atlantic economy.

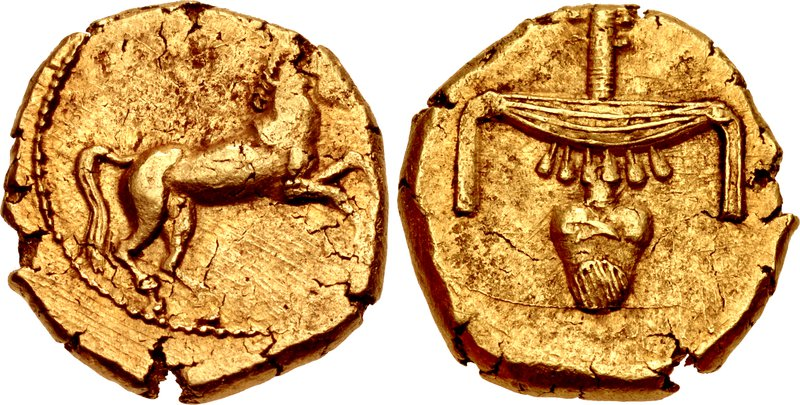
Egyptian gold stater of Nectanebo II: reverse with hieroglyphs nfr-nb. It is the first coin minted in Egypt, c. 360 BC.

A significant factor on economic development was the gain of human capital by the elite. Between the 14th and 20th centuries, it can be observed that in regions that had more violence within the elite (and hence higher chances to die at a younger age), the elite invested less education. Therefore, their numeracy (as a measure of human capital) tended to be lower than in less safe countries and vice versa. According to economic historians Joerg Baten and Kleoniki Alexopoulou, this can explain the difference in economic development between the African regions.

=== Colonial period ===
The Berlin Conference of 1884–85 regulated European colonization and trade in Africa during the Imperialism period, and coincided with Germany's sudden emergence as an imperial power. The conference ushered in a period of heightened colonial activity by European powers, while simultaneously eliminating most existing forms of African autonomy and self-governance.

Under colonial rule, the plantation system of farming was widely introduced in order to grow large quantities of cash crops, and employing cheap (often forced) African labour for export to European countries. This marked a governmental shift toward capitalistic industrial production into Africa, severely de-centring and deteriorating traditional African markets such as salt, textiles, ironwork, and ceramics. Opposed to agricultural productions for community sustenance or local markets, large-scale monopolized production for export became the primary farming practice and colonial economic focus. This substituted seasonal biodiverse crop rotations and handling with monocultures and plantations, further eroding and depleting nutrients from large plots of fertile land. This included crops such as indigo, sugar, coffee, tea, tobacco, palm oil, and rubber. Mining for gems and precious metals such as gold was developed in a similar way by wealthy European entrepreneurs such as Cecil Rhodes. The implementation and effects of these colonial policies could be brutal, as land dispossession, physical violence, and economic constraint forced Africans into labour for the purpose of export and economic production. One extreme example of exploitation of Africans during this period is the Congo Free State, administered under a form of "company rule". The Belgians, under Leopold II of Belgium, allowed businesses to use forced labour as they saw fit. The brutal conditions, famine and disease ended in the deaths of an estimated 10 million Congolese between 1885 and 1908.

Colonial economic policies favoured open economies, focused on the immediate export of raw materials with little investment into growing domestic manufacturing. Starting in the 1920s, colonial administrations began rapid industrialisation at the expense of local needs, disrupting traditional agrarian economies and forcing people into exploitative labour markets for sectors such as mining and large-scale farming. These industries further affected familial policy and home economies, as mining and agriculture industries employed African workers in declared "white only" geographical areas. Racial segregation allowed companies to justify paying Black workers "bachelor wages" which were not enough to support an entire family, as workers were forced to live in close proximity to their employment with restriction on their contact with those who did not work in the townships (typically mothers and children). This meant that Black laborers were separated from the rest of their families due to capitalistic and racially discriminatory policies, normalizing male labour migrancy in African families.

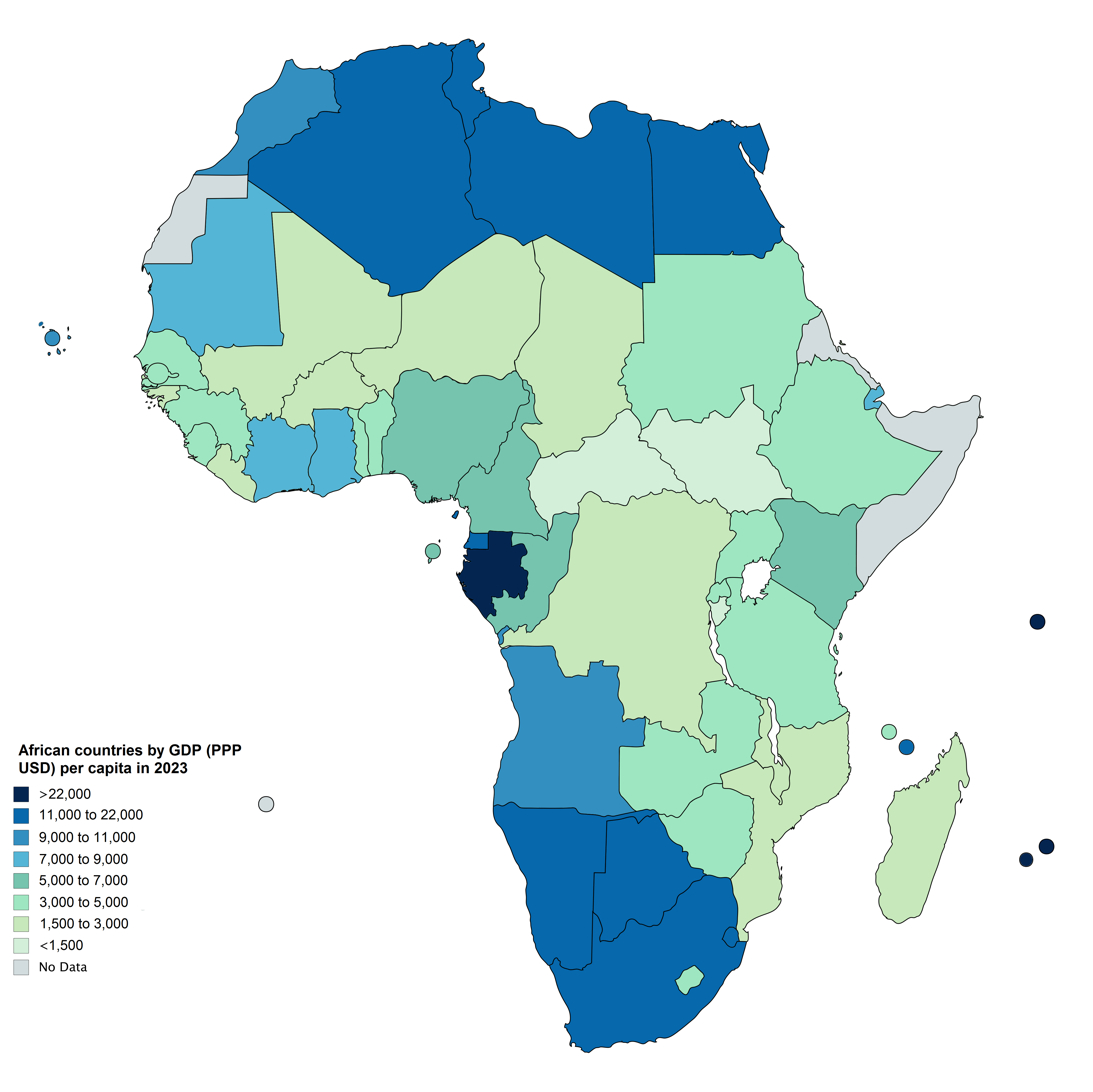
African countries by GDP (PPP) per capita in 2023

=== Post-colonial period ===
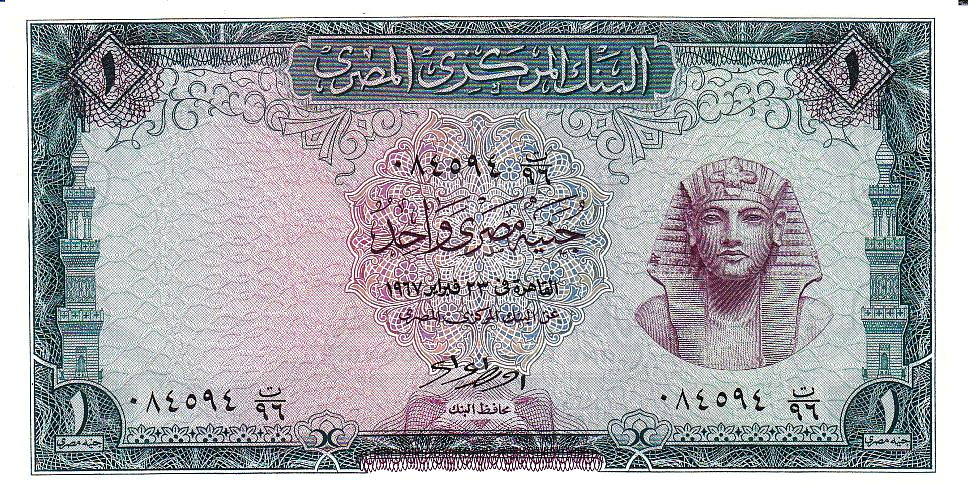
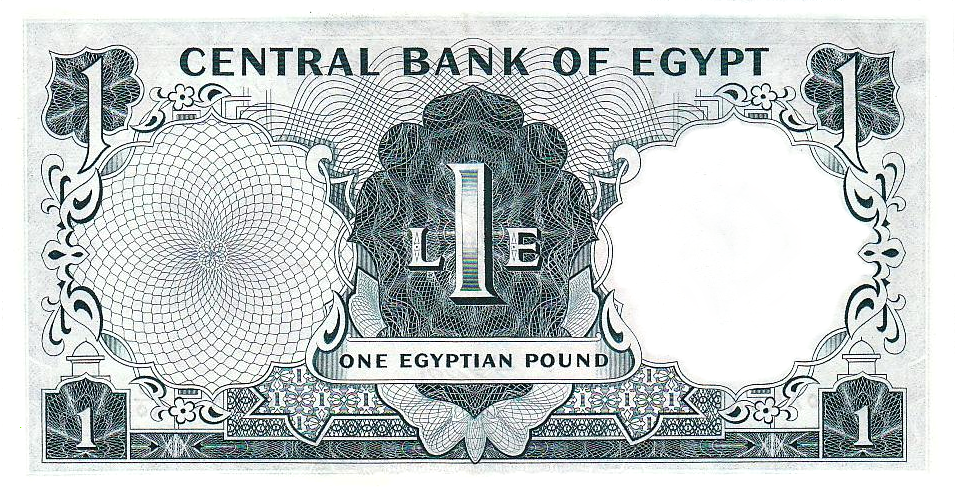
Obverse and reverse of the 1967 issue of E£1 banknote

After Africa began decolonising in 1960, post-colonial governments implemented various policies aiming to grow their economies via state-led industrialisation to correct perceived market-failures, often advised by aid donors or international bodies such as the World Bank. A common policy was import-substitution (the replacement of imports with domestic products via protectionist policies), but governments focused on exporting raw materials in order to gain the capital to industrialise, and countries remained as suppliers of raw materials with little industrial development. While import-substitution policies initially led to growths in manufacturing, firms struggled to compete globally without heavy protection, and exports were low which tightened the balance of payments.

In the 1980s, amid the neoliberalism wave of the Washington Consensus, international financial institutions such as the World Bank and International Monetary Fund (IMF) led a neo-classical 'revolution' against industrial policy, citing "significant government failures" and debt crises, arguing that markets better allocate resources and that trade liberalisation would lead to development. The 1980s and '90s saw widespread deindustrialisation, and industrial production as a share of GDP declined from the 1980s onwards.

=== 21st century ===
The dawn of the African economic boom (which is in place since the 2000s) has been compared to the reform and opening up that had emerged in China since late 1970s, though high growth rates were largely derived from high commodity prices and did little to reduce poverty. As of 2013, the Multilateral Debt Relief Initiative (MDRI) has given partial debt relief to 30 African countries. In 2013, Africa was home to seven of the world's fastest-growing economies. In the 21st century China and India have been increasingly important trade partners.

As of 2018, Nigeria was the biggest economy in Africa by nominal GDP, followed by South Africa; in terms of PPP, Egypt was second biggest after Nigeria. Equatorial Guinea has Africa's highest GDP per capita. Oil-rich countries such as Algeria, Libya and Gabon, and mineral-rich Botswana have emerged among the top economies since the 21st century, while Zimbabwe and the Democratic Republic of Congo are potentially among the world's richest nations by natural resources, but have sunk into the list of the world's poorest nations due to pervasive political corruption, warfare, and emigration. The establishment of the African Continental Free Trade Area by the African Union in 2018 intended to boost business activities between member states and within the continent, and to reduce too much reliance on importation of finished products and raw materials in to the continent.

In response to the COVID-19 pandemic, fiscal stimulus packages in African countries through to mid-2020 amounted to roughly 1–2% of GDP, with monetary stimulus amounting to about 2% of GDP, close to the IMF's global average for low-income developing nations. As African nations struggled to address the health and economic repercussions of the pandemic, the average fiscal deficit throughout Africa increased from 5% of GDP in 2019 to over 8% in 2020, increasing government borrowing which African countries have less capacity to absorb than other developed economies. Despite this, African private investment was steady in 2020.

Sub-Saharan Africa was severely harmed when government revenue declined from 22% of GDP in 2011 to 17% in 2021. 15 African nations hold significant debt risk, and as of 2022 seven were in financial crisis according to the IMF. The region received IMF Special Drawing Rights of $23 billion in 2021 to assist critical public spending. In a recent report, female-led businesses were found more likely to invest in innovation, export goods and services, and provide employee training, while also having lower bankruptcy rates. According to a 2024 report, Africa's share of global GDP has stagnated at 3.1% over the last two decades, with slow income convergence with developed nations, while 90% of production exports in Africa were unprocessed goods.

== Economic development ==
The seemingly intractable nature of Africa's poverty has led to debate concerning its root causes. Endemic warfare and unrest, widespread corruption, and despotic regimes are both causes and effects of the continued economic problems. The decolonization of Africa was fraught with instability aggravated by cold war conflict. Since the mid-20th century, the Cold War and increased corruption, poor governance, disease and despotism have also contributed to Africa's poor economy.

According to The Economist, the most important factors are government corruption, political instability, socialist economics, and protectionist trade policy. Oluwatosin Adeniyi has lamented the lack of "African economics" as a distinct 'Africanised' discipline in the same vein as African history or African psychology.

=== Infrastructure ===
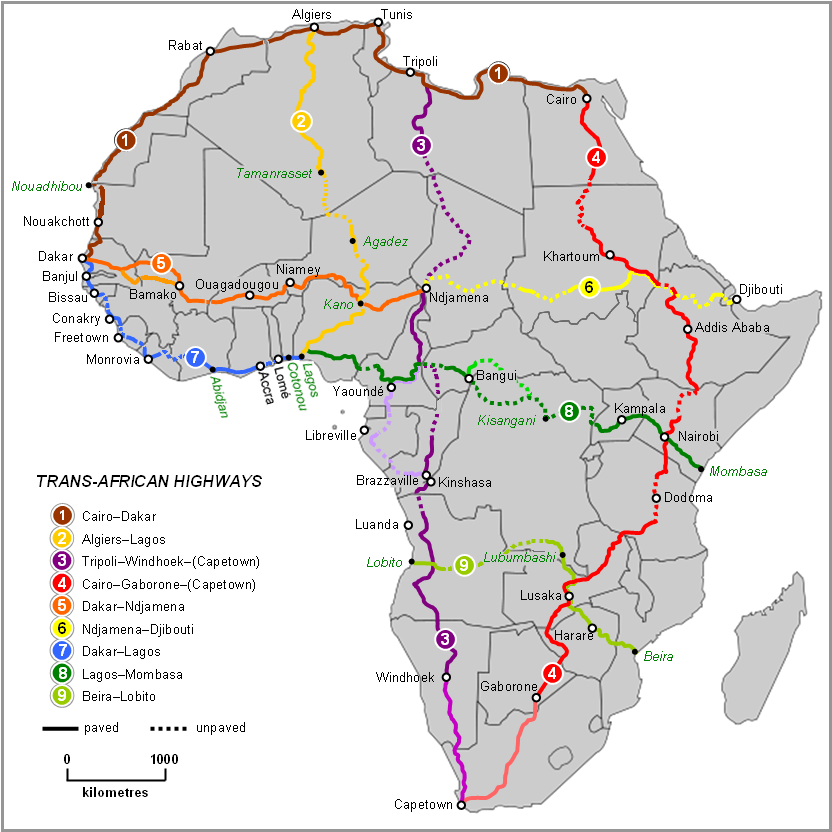
The Trans-African Highway network

According to the researchers at the Overseas Development Institute, the lack of infrastructure in many developing countries represents one of the most significant limitations to economic growth and achievement of the Millennium Development Goals (MDGs). Infrastructure investments and maintenance can be very expensive, especially in such areas as landlocked, rural and sparsely populated countries in Africa.

It has been argued that infrastructure investments contributed to more than half of Africa's improved growth performance between 1990 and 2005 and increased investment is necessary to maintain growth and tackle poverty. The returns to investment in infrastructure are very significant, with on average 30–40% returns for telecommunications (ICT) investments, over 40% for electricity generation, and 80% for roads.

In Africa, it is argued that to meet the MDGs by 2015, infrastructure investments would need to reach about 15% of GDP (around $93 billion a year). Currently, the source of financing varies significantly across sectors. Some sectors are dominated by state spending, others by overseas development aid (ODA) and yet others by private investors. In sub-Saharan Africa, the state spends around $9.4 billion out of a total of $24.9 billion.

In irrigation, sub-Saharan African states represent almost all spending; in transport and energy a majority of investment is state spending; in Information and communication technologies and water supply and sanitation, the private sector represents the majority of capital expenditure. Overall, aid, the private sector and non-OECD financiers between them exceed state spending. The private sector spending alone equals state capital expenditure, though the majority is focused on ICT infrastructure investments. External financing increased from $7 billion (2002) to $27 billion (2009). China, in particular, has emerged as an important investor.

=== Colonialism ===
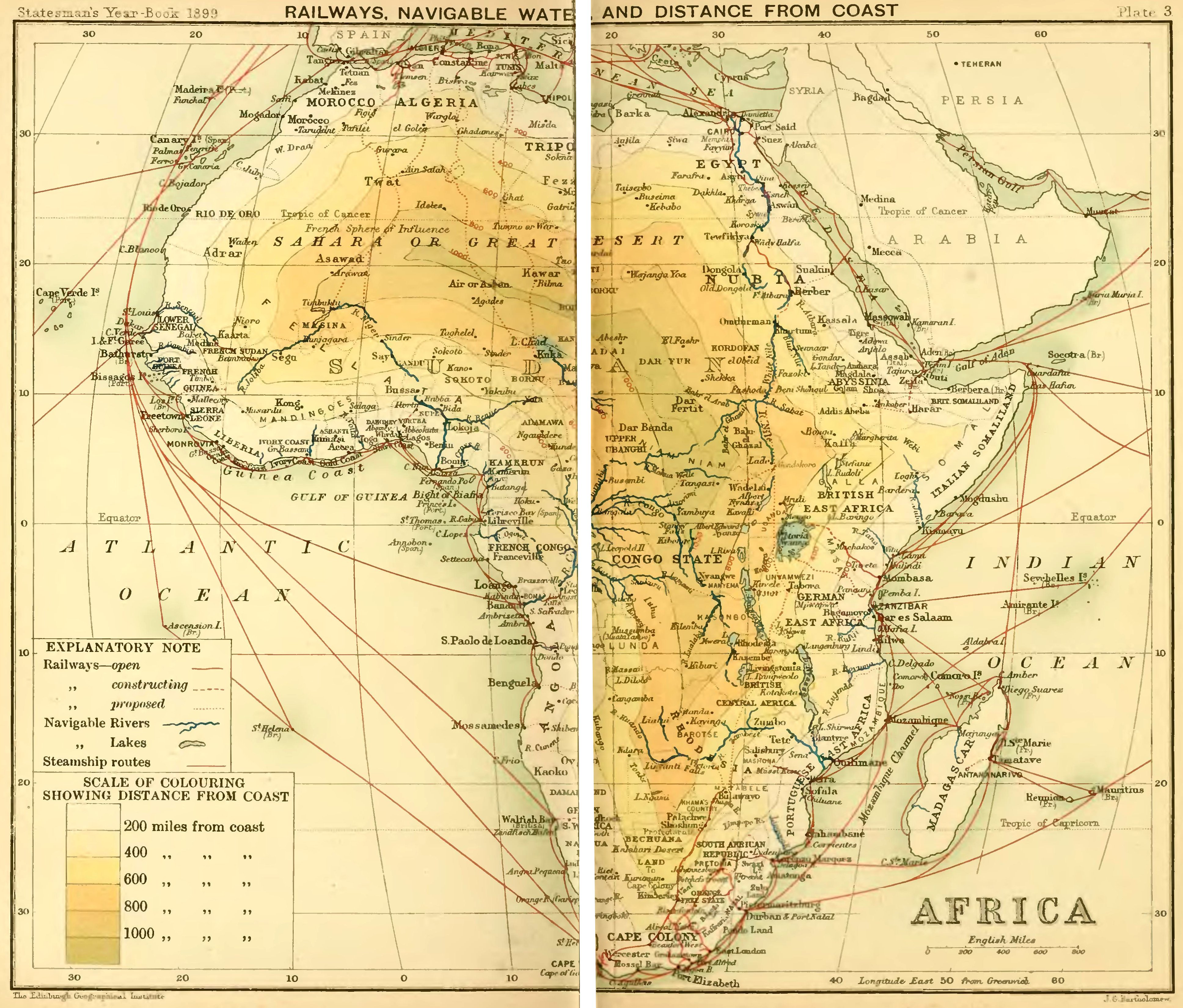
Railway map of Africa, including tracks proposed and under construction, The Statesman's Yearbook, 1899

The principal aim of colonial rule in Africa by European colonial powers was to exploit natural wealth in the African continent at a low cost. Some writers, such as Walter Rodney in his book How Europe Underdeveloped Africa, argue that these colonial policies are directly responsible for many of Africa's modern problems. Critics of colonialism charge colonial rule with injuring African pride, self-worth and belief in themselves. Other post-colonial scholars, most notably Frantz Fanon continuing along this line, have argued that the true effects of colonialism are psychological and that domination by a foreign power creates a lasting sense of inferiority and subjugation that creates a barrier to growth and innovation. Such arguments posit that a new generation of Africans free of colonial thought and mindset is emerging and that this is driving economic transformation.

Historians L. H. Gann and Peter Duignan have argued that Africa probably benefited from colonialism on balance. Although it had its faults, colonialism was probably "one of the most efficacious engines for cultural diffusion in world history". These views, however, are controversial and are rejected by some who, on balance, see colonialism as bad. The economic historian David Kenneth Fieldhouse has taken a kind of middle position, arguing that the effects of colonialism were actually limited and their main weakness wasn't in deliberate underdevelopment but in what it failed to do. Niall Ferguson agrees with his last point, arguing that colonialism's main weaknesses were sins of omission. Analysis of the economies of African states finds that independent states such as Liberia and Ethiopia did not have better economic performance than their post-colonial counterparts. In particular the economic performance of former British colonies was better than both independent states and former French colonies.

Africa's relative poverty predates colonialism. Jared Diamond argues in Guns, Germs, and Steel that Africa has always been poor due to a number of ecological factors affecting historical development. These factors include low population density, the tsetse fly, malaria, lack of navigable rivers, and the north–south orientation of Africa's geography. However Diamond's theories have been criticized by some including James Morris Blaut as a form of environmental determinism. Historian John K. Thornton argues that sub-Saharan Africa was relatively wealthy and technologically advanced until at least the seventeenth century. Some scholars who believe that Africa was generally poorer than the rest of the world throughout its history make exceptions for certain parts of Africa. Acemoglue and Robinson, for example, argue that most of Africa has always been relatively poor, but "Aksum, Ghana, Songhay, Mali, [and] Great Zimbabwe ... were probably as developed as their contemporaries anywhere in the world." A number of people including Rodney and Joseph E. Inikori have argued that the poverty of Africa at the onset of the colonial period was principally due to the demographic loss associated with the slave trade as well as other related societal shifts. Others such as J. D. Fage and David Eltis have rejected this view.

=== Language diversity ===
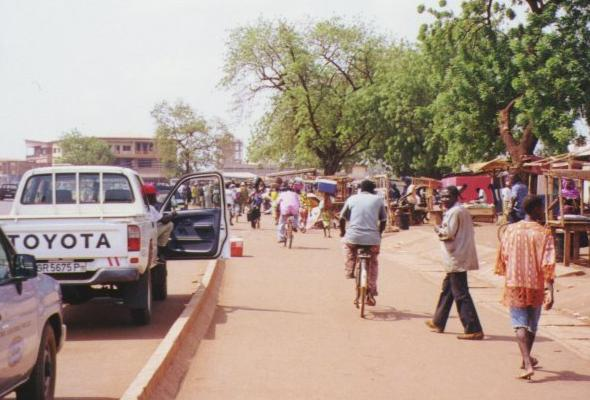
Ghana is a country with high language diversity. Asante 16%, Ewe 14%, Fante 11.6%, Boron (Brong) 4.9%, Dagomba 4.4%, Dangme 4.2%, Dagarte (Dagaba) 3.9%, Kokomba 3.5%, Akyem 3.2%, Ga 3.1%, other 31.2%.

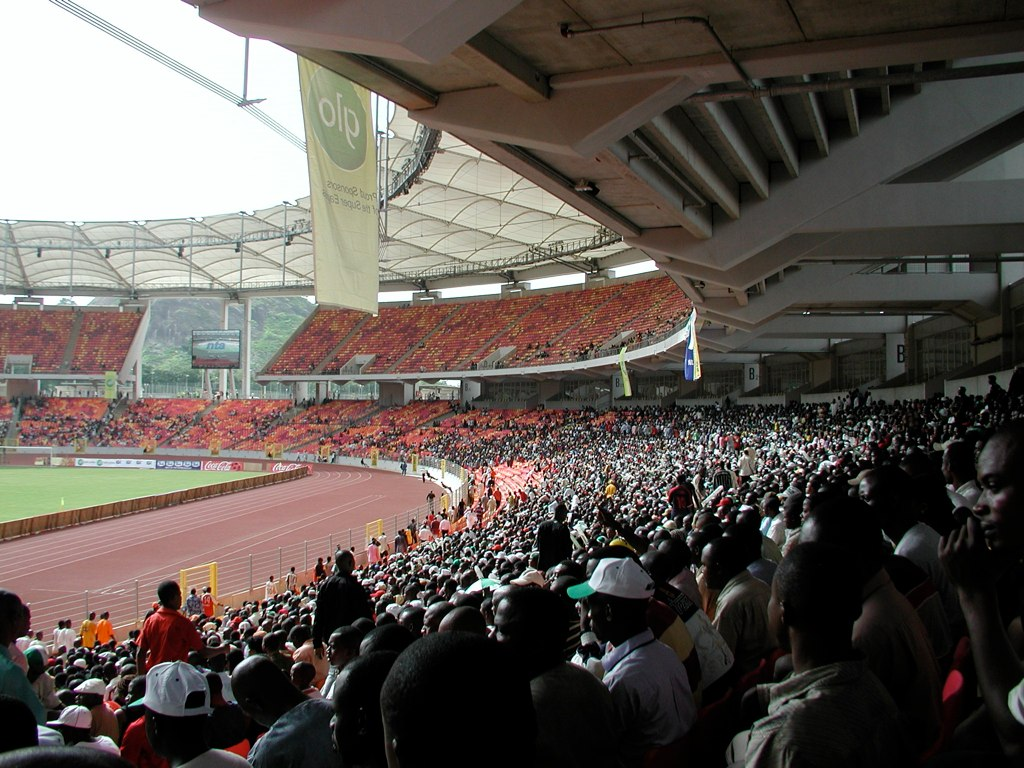
Nigeria Football Ground in 2011

African countries suffer from communication difficulties caused by language diversity. Greenberg's diversity index is the chance that two randomly selected people would have different mother tongues. Out of the most diverse 25 countries according to this index, 18 (72%) are African. This includes 12 countries for which Greenberg's diversity index exceeds 0.9, meaning that a pair of randomly selected people will have less than 10% chance of having the same mother tongue. In addition, the primary language of government, political debate, academic discourse, and administration is often the language of the former colonial powers, English, French, Arabic, or Portuguese, which many do not speak.

=== Trade-based theories ===
Dependency theory asserts that the wealth and prosperity of the superpowers and their allies in Europe, North America and East Asia is dependent upon the poverty of the rest of the world, including Africa. Economists who subscribe to this theory believe that poorer regions must break their trading ties with the developed world in order to prosper. Modern African scholars advocate for Local economic development instead, which is the process in which business activity and employment are used to stimulate or maintain the economy, particularly through local government or community-based organizations. This theory advocates for a lessened dependence on the Global North and instead on self-reliance in identifying, managing, and managing local knowledge and skills in the name of development.

Less radical theories suggest that economic protectionism in developed countries hampers Africa's growth. When developing countries have harvested agricultural produce at low cost, they generally do not export as much as would be expected. Abundant farm subsidies and high import tariffs in the developed world, most notably those set by Japan, the European Union's Common Agricultural Policy, and the United States Department of Agriculture, are thought to be the cause. Although these subsidies and tariffs have been gradually reduced, they remain high.

Local conditions also affect exports; state over-regulation in several African nations can prevent their own exports from becoming competitive. Research in Public Choice economics such as that of Jane Shaw suggest that protectionism operates in tandem with heavy State intervention combining to depress economic development. Farmers subject to import and export restrictions cater to localized markets, exposing them to higher market volatility and fewer opportunities. When subject to uncertain market conditions, farmers press for governmental intervention to suppress competition in their markets, resulting in competition being driven out of the market. As competition is driven out of the market, farmers innovate less and grow less food further undermining economic performance.

=== Governance ===
Although Africa and Asia had similar levels of income in the 1960s, Asia has since outpaced Africa, with the exception of a few extremely poor and war-torn countries like Afghanistan and Yemen. One school of economists argues that Asia's superior economic development lies in local investment. Corruption in Africa consists primarily of extracting economic rent and moving the resulting financial capital overseas instead of investing at home; the stereotype of African dictators with Swiss bank accounts is often accurate. University of Massachusetts Amherst researchers estimate that from 1970 to 1996, capital flight from 30 sub-Saharan countries totalled $187bn, exceeding those nations' external debts. Authors Leonce Ndikumana and James K. Boyce estimate that from 1970 to 2008, capital flight from 33 sub-Saharan countries totalled $700bn.

Congolese dictator Mobutu Sese Seko became notorious for corruption, nepotism, and the embezzlement of between US$4 billion and $15 billion during his reign. Socialist governments influenced by Marxism, and the land reform they have enacted, have also contributed to economic stagnation in Africa. For example, the regime of Robert Mugabe in Zimbabwe, particularly the land seizures from white farmers, led to the collapse of the country's agricultural economy, which had formerly been one of Africa's strongest; Mugabe had been previously supported by the USSR and China during the Zimbabwe War of Liberation. Tanzania was left as one of the world's poorest and most aid-dependent nations, and has taken decades to recover. Since the abolition of the socialist one-party state in 1992 and the transition to democracy, Tanzania has experienced rapid economic growth, with growth of 6.5% in 2017.

=== Foreign aid ===
Since 1960, Africa has received billions of dollars in aid. In the last 30 years alone, one estimate puts aid to the continent at $1.2 trillion, though distributed very unevenly across the continent. In this time, African economies have developed. Life expectancy and populations have both risen dramatically, and absolute poverty has fallen. The rise in living standards has been relatively meagre, and few African countries have achieved the rapid economic growth seen in much of Asia, in South Korea, China, Vietnam, Indonesia, India or Bangladesh, in the same period.

Historically, food aid is more highly correlated with excess supply than with the needs of developing countries. Foreign aid has been an integral part of African economic development since the 1980s, according to the Economist.

The aid model has been criticized for supplanting trade initiatives. Growing evidence shows that foreign aid has made the continent poorer. One of the biggest critics of the aid development model is economist Dambisa Moyo (a Zambian economist based in the US), who introduced the Dead Aid model, which highlights how foreign aid has been a deterrent for local development.

Today, Africa faces the problem of attracting foreign aid in areas where there is potential for high income from demand. It is in need of more economic policies and active participation in the world economy. As globalization has heightened the competition for foreign aid among developing countries, Africa has been trying to improve its struggle to receive foreign aid by taking more responsibility at the regional and international level. In addition, Africa has created the Africa Action Plan in order to obtain new relationships with development partners to share responsibilities regarding discovering ways to receive aid from foreign investors.

Nevertheless, foreign aid to Africa also gives Africa positive effect. Greg Mills is director of the Brenthurst Foundation, a South African think-tank funded partly by the Oppenheimer family. Mills considers that the failure of aid to create faster development is a political failure, not an economic one.

== Foreign trade ==
The African Union is the largest international economic grouping on the continent. The confederation's goals include the creation of a free trade area (established in 2018), a customs union (African Union Passport), a single market, a central bank (African Central Bank), and a common currency (African Monetary Union), thereby establishing an economic and monetary union. The African Investment Bank is meant to stimulate development. The AU plans also include a transitional African Monetary Fund leading to an African Central Bank. Some parties support development of an even more unified United States of Africa.

International monetary and banking unions include:

- Central Bank of West African States
- Bank of Central African States
- Common Monetary Area

Major economic unions are shown in the chart below.

African Economic Community
Pillar regional blocs (REC)	Area (km²)	Population	GDP (PPP) ($US)		Member states
Pillar regional blocs (REC)	Area (km²)	Population	(millions)	(per capita)	Member states
EAC	5,449,717	349,966,685	737,420	2,149	8
ECOWAS/CEDEAO	5,112,903	349,154,000	1,322,452	3,788	15
IGAD	5,233,604	294,197,387	225,049	1,197	7
AMU/UMA ^{4}	6,046,441	106,919,526	1,299,173	12,628	5
ECCAS/CEEAC	6,667,421	218,261,591	175,928	1,451	11
SADC	9,882,959	394,845,175	737,392	3,152	15
COMESA	12,873,957	406,102,471	735,599	1,811	20
CEN-SAD ^{4}	14,680,111				29
Total AEC	29,910,442	853,520,010	2,053,706	2,406	54
Other regional blocs	Area (km²)	Population	GDP (PPP) ($US)		Member states
Other regional blocs	Area (km²)	Population	(millions)	(per capita)	Member states
WAMZ ^{1}	1,602,991	264,456,910	1,551,516	5,867	6
SACU ^{1}	2,693,418	51,055,878	541,433	10,605	5
CEMAC ^{2}	3,020,142	34,970,529	85,136	2,435	6
UEMOA ^{1}	3,505,375	80,865,222	101,640	1,257	8
UMA ^{2} ^{4}	5,782,140	84,185,073	491,276	5,836	5
GAFTA ^{3} ^{4}	5,876,960	1,662,596	6,355	3,822	5
AES	2,780,159	71,374,000	179,347		3
During 2004. Sources: The World Factbook 2005, IMF WEO Database. Smallest value among the blocs compared. Largest value among the blocs compared.^{1}: Economic bloc inside a pillar REC.^{2}: Proposed for pillar REC, but objecting participation.^{3}: Non-African members of GAFTA are excluded from figures.^{4}: The area 446,550 km^{2} used for Morocco excludes all disputed territories, while 710,850 km^{2} would include the Moroccan-claimed and partially-controlled parts of Western Sahara (claimed as the Sahrawi Arab Democratic Republic by the Polisario Front). Morocco also claims Ceuta and Melilla, making up about 22.8 km^{2} (8.8 sq mi) more claimed territory.

=== Regional economic organizations ===
During the 1960s, Ghanaian politician Kwame Nkrumah promoted economic and political union of African countries, with the goal of independence. Since then, objectives, and organizations, have multiplied. Recent decades have brought efforts at various degrees of regional economic integration. Trade between African states accounts for only 11% of Africa's total commerce as of 2012, around five times less than in Asia. Most of this intra-Africa trade originates from South Africa and most of the trade exports coming out of South Africa goes to abutting countries in Southern Africa.

There are currently eight regional organizations that assist with economic development in Africa:

Name of organization	Date created	Member countries	Cumulative GDP (US$ millions)
Economic Community of West African States	28 May 1975	Benin, Burkina Faso, Cape Verde, Gambia, Ghana, Guinea-Bissau, Guinea, Ivory Coast, Liberia, Mali, Niger, Nigeria, Senegal, Sierra Leone, Togo	657
East African Community	30 November 1999	Burundi, Kenya, Uganda, Rwanda, Tanzania	232
Economic Community of Central African States	18 October 1983	Angola, Burundi, Cameroon, Central African Republic, Congo, Democratic Republic of Congo, Gabon, Guinea, São Tomé and Príncipe, Chad	289
Southern African Development Community	17 August 1992	Angola, Botswana, Eswatini (Swaziland), Lesotho, Madagascar, Malawi, Mauritius, Mozambique, Namibia, Democratic Republic of Congo, Seychelles, South Africa, Tanzania, Zambia, Zimbabwe	909
Intergovernmental Authority on Development	25 November 1996	Djibouti, Ethiopia, Kenya, Uganda, Somalia, Sudan, South Sudan	326
Community of Sahel-Saharan States	4 February 1998	Benin, Burkina Faso, Central African Republic, Comoros, Djibouti, Egypt, Eritrea, Gambia, Ghana, Guinea, Guinea-Bissau, Ivory Coast, Kenya, Liberia, Libya, Mali, Morocco, Mauritania, Niger, Nigeria, São Tomé and Príncipe, Senegal, Sierra Leone, Somalia, Sudan, Chad, Togo, Tunisia	1,692
Common Market for Eastern and Southern Africa	5 November 1993	Burundi, Comoros, Djibouti, Egypt, Eritrea, Eswatini (Swaziland), Ethiopia, Kenya, Liberia, Madagascar, Malawi, Mauritius, Uganda, Democratic Republic of Congo, Rwanda, Seychelles, Sudan, Zambia, Zimbabwe	1,011
Arab Maghreb Union	17 February 1989	Algeria, Libya, Morocco, Mauritania, Tunisia	579

== Economic variants ==
Map of Africa by nominal GDP in billions USD (2020): >200 100–200 50–100 20–50 / 10–20 5–10 1–5 <1

After an initial rebound from the 2009 world economic crisis, Africa's economy was undermined in 2011 by the Arab uprisings. The continent's growth fell back from 5% in 2010 to 3.4% in 2011. With the recovery of North African economies and sustained improvement in other regions, growth across the continent was expected to accelerate to 4.5% in 2012 and 4.8% in 2013. Short-term problems for the world economy remained as Europe confronted its debt crisis. Commodity prices—crucial for Africa—have declined from their peak due to weaker demand and increased supply, and some could fall further. However, prices are expected to remain at levels favourable for African exporters.

=== Regions ===
Economic activity has rebounded across Africa. However, the pace of recovery was uneven among groups of countries and subregions. Oil-exporting countries generally expanded more strongly than oil-importing countries. West Africa and East Africa were the two best-performing subregions in 2010.

Intra-African trade has been slowed by protectionist policies among countries and regions, and remains low at 17 percent, compared to Europe, where intra-regional trade is at 69 percent. Despite this, trade between countries belonging to the Common Market for Eastern and Southern Africa (COMESA), a particularly strong economic region, grew six-fold over the past decade up to 2012. Ghana and Kenya, for example, have developed markets within the region for construction materials, machinery, and finished products, quite different from the mining and agriculture products that make up the bulk of their international exports.

The African Ministers of Trade agreed in 2010 to create a Pan-Africa Free Trade Zone. This would reduce countries' tariffs on imports and increase intra-African trade, and it is hoped, the diversification of the economy overall.

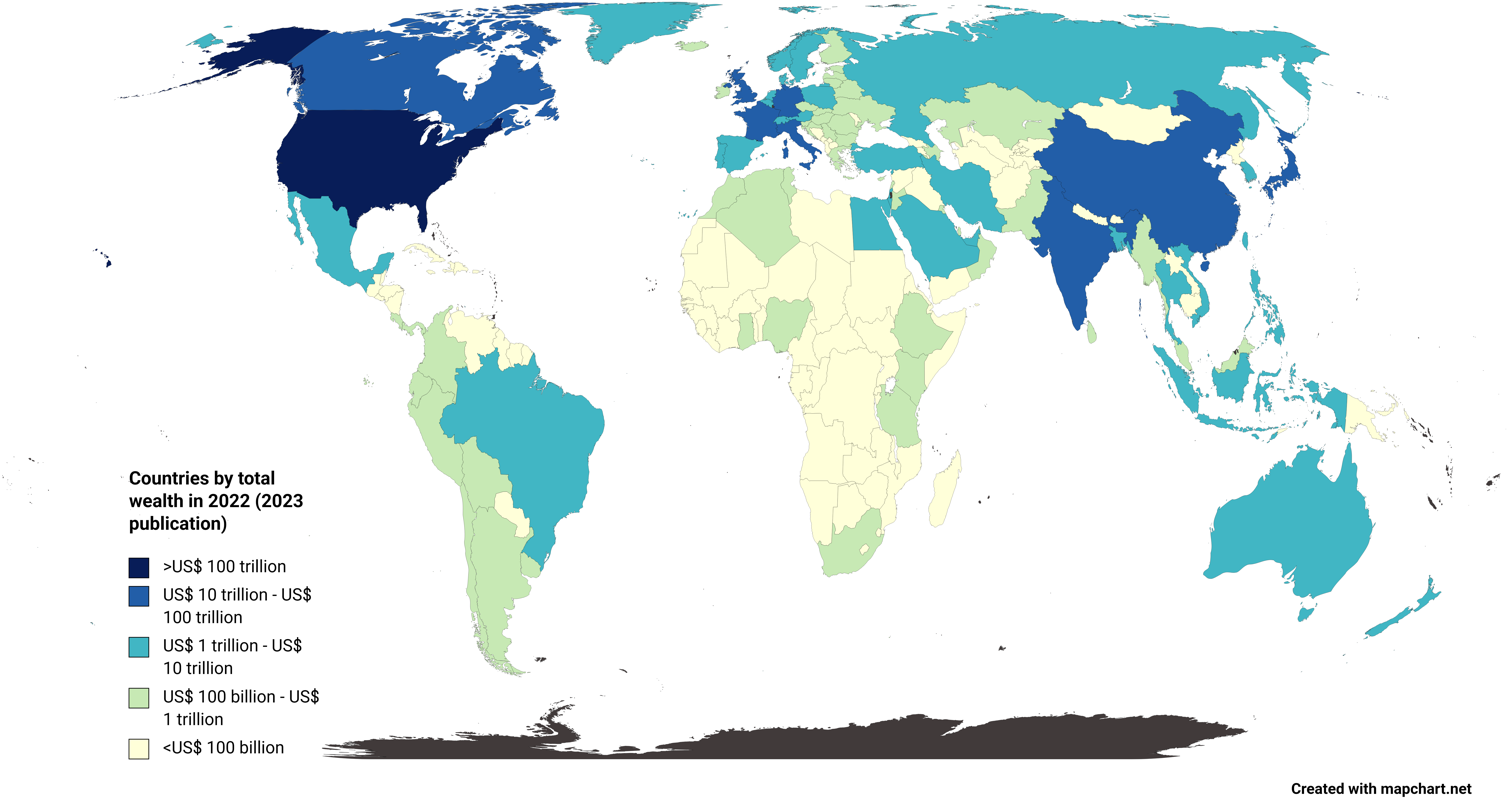
Countries by total wealth (trillions USD), Credit Suisse

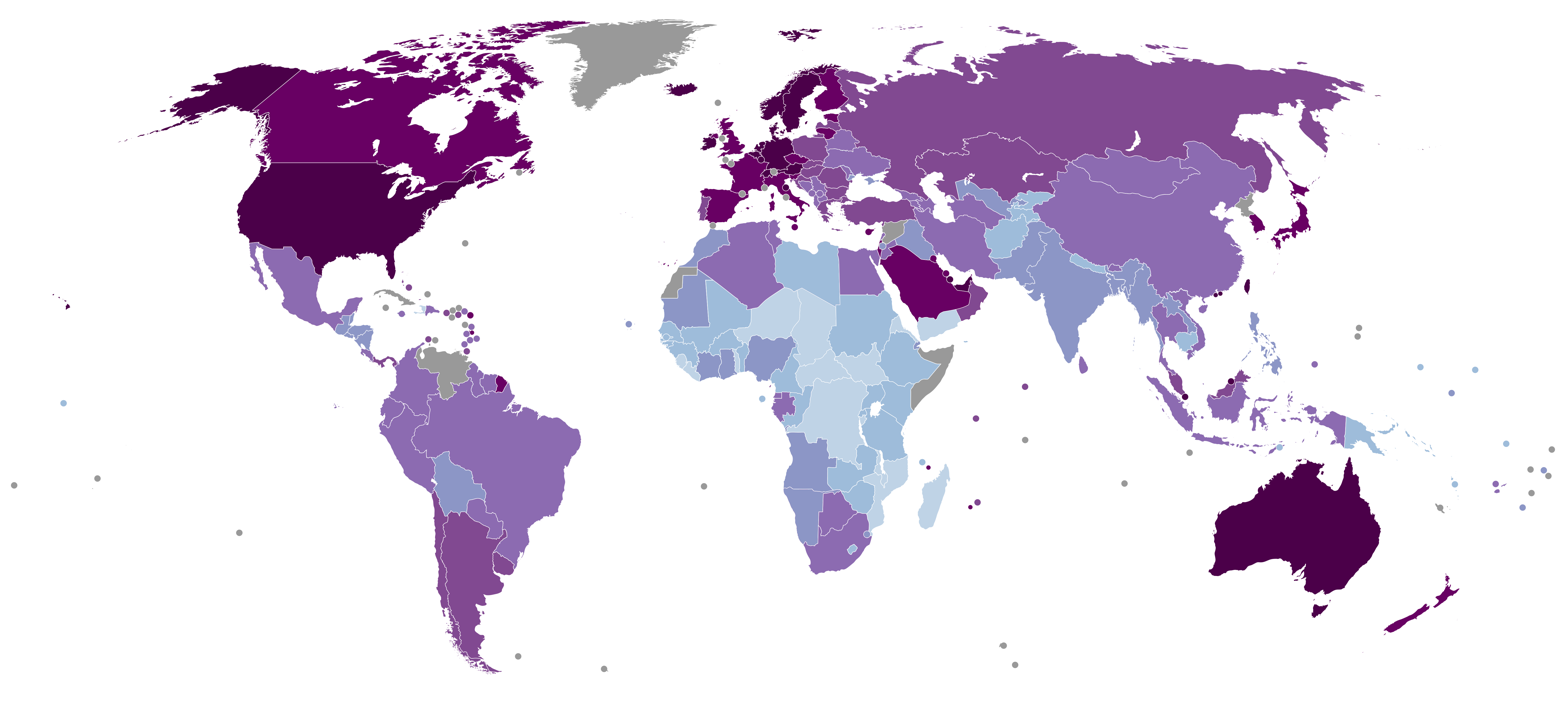
Countries by 2020 GDP (PPP) per capita

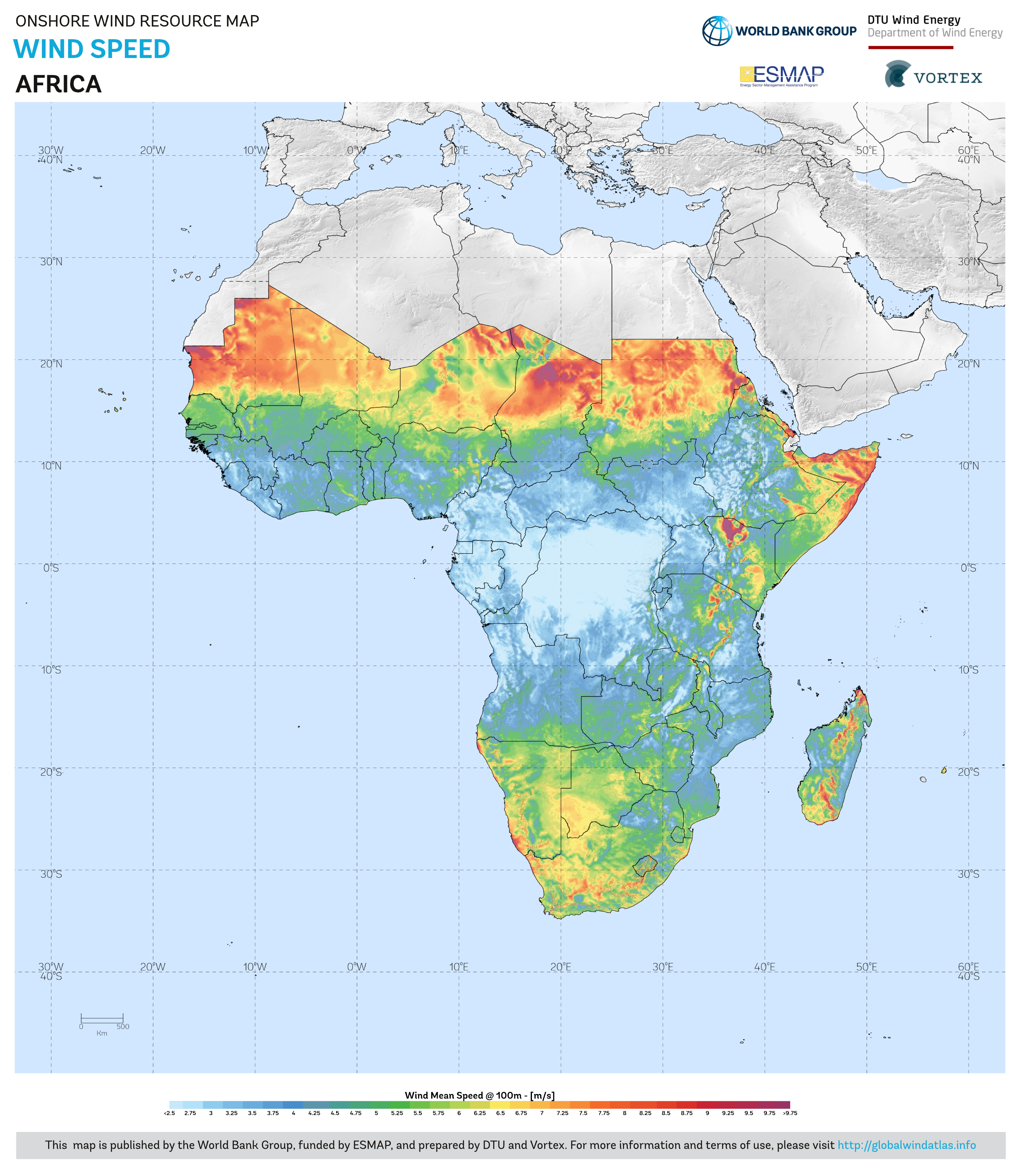
Mean wind speed in Sub-Saharan Africa

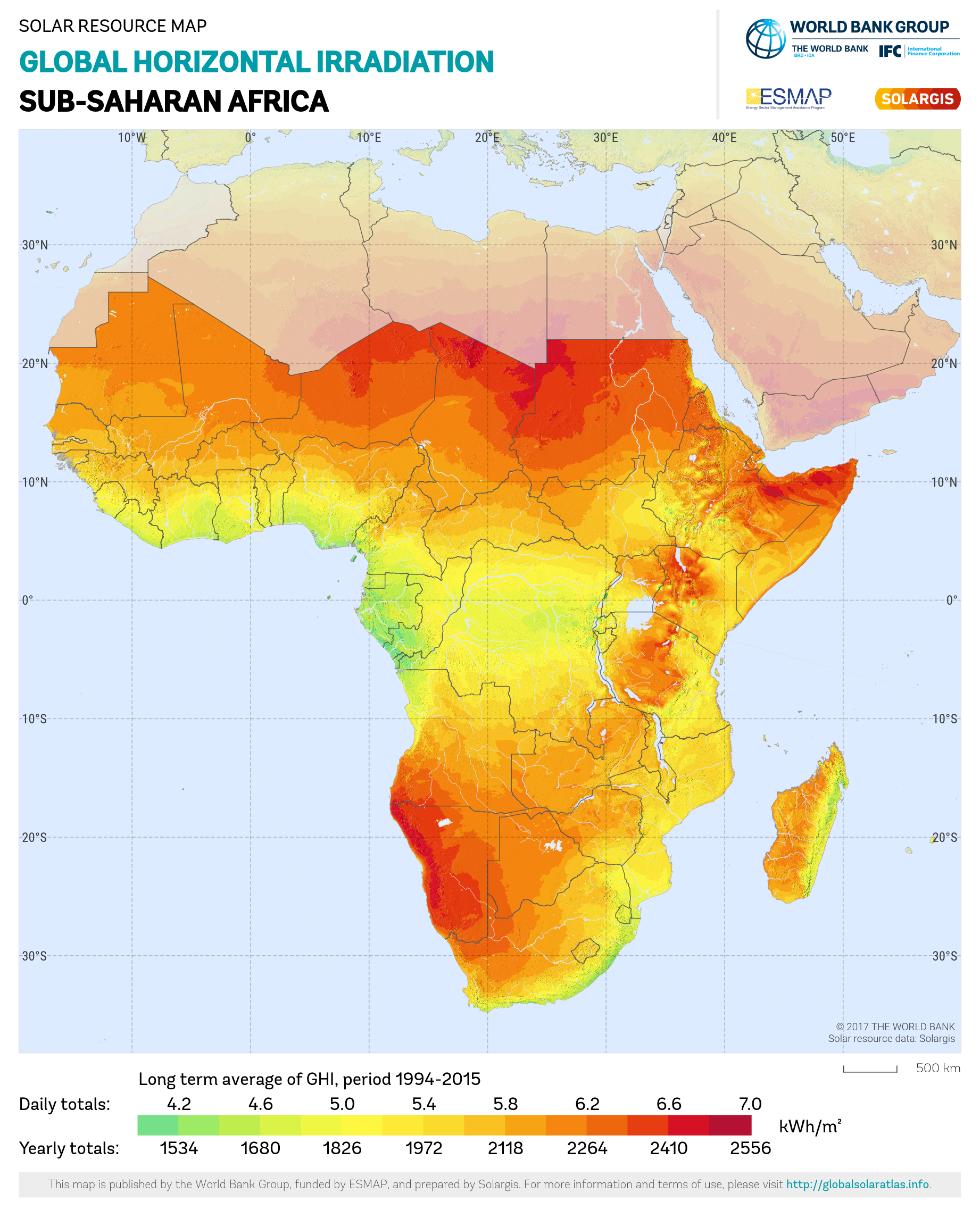
Global horizontal irradiation in Sub-Saharan Africa

=== African nations ===
Country	Total GDP (nominal) in 2019 (billion US$)	GDP per capita in 2019 (US$, PPP)	Average annual real GDP growth 2010–2019 (%)	HDI 2019
Algeria	169.3	11,729	2.6	0.748
Angola	89.4	7,384	1.9	0.581
Benin	14.4	3,423	5.1	0.545
Botswana	18.5	17,949	4.3	0.735
Burkina Faso	15.7	2,282	5.7	0.452
Burundi	3.1	821	2.0	0.433
Cameroon	38.9	3,856	4.6	0.563
Cape Verde	2.0	7,471	2.9	0.665
Central African Republic	2.3	985	−1.8	0.397
Chad	10.9	1,654	2.2	0.398
Comoros	1.2	3,108	3.1	0.554
DR Congo	49.8	1,015	6.1	0.480
Congo	12.5	4,600	−1.0	0.574
Djibouti	3.3	5,195	6.6	0.524
Egypt	302.3	12,391	3.8	0.707
Equatorial Guinea	11.8	19,291	−2.9	0.592
Eritrea	2.0	1,836	3.4	0.459
Eswatini (Swaziland)	4.6	9,245	2.4	0.611
Ethiopia	92.8	2,724	9.5	0.485
Gabon	16.9	16,273	3.7	0.703
Gambia	1.8	2,316	2.4	0.496
Ghana	67.0	5,688	6.5	0.611
Guinea	13.8	2,506	6.2	0.477
Guinea-Bissau	1.4	2,429	3.8	0.480
Ivory Coast	58.6	5,327	6.7	0.538
Kenya	95.4	4,985	5.6	0.601
Lesotho	2.4	3,010	2.8	0.527
Liberia	3.2	1,601	2.7	0.480
Libya	39.8	14,174	−10.2	0.724
Madagascar	14.1	1,720	3.4	0.528
Malawi	7.7	1,004	3.8	0.483
Mali	17.3	2,508	4.3	0.434
Mauritania	7.6	6,036	3.9	0.546
Mauritius	14.0	23,819	3.6	0.804
Mayotte (France)	3.1 (2018)	11,815 (nominal, 2018)	(N/A)	(N/A)
Morocco	118.6	8,148	3.4	0.686
Mozambique	15.2	1,302	5.4	0.456
Namibia	12.5	10,279	2.8	0.646
Niger	12.9	1,276	5.9	0.394
Nigeria	448.1	5,353	3.0	0.539
Réunion (France)	22.0	25,639 (nominal)	2.1	0.850 (2003)
Rwanda	10.1	2,363	7.6	0.543
São Tomé and Príncipe	0.4	4,141	3.9	0.625
Senegal	23.6	3,536	5.3	0.512
Seychelles	1.7	30,430	4.6	0.796
Sierra Leone	4.2	1,778	4.4	0.452
Somalia	18.2	888.00	(N/A)	0.364 (2008)
South Africa	351.4	12,962	1.5	0.709
South Sudan	4.9	862	(N/A)	0.433
Sudan	33.4	4,140	−1.6	0.510
Tanzania	60.8	2,841	6.7	0.529
Togo	5.5	1,657	5.6	0.515
Tunisia	38.8	11,125	1.8	0.740
Uganda	36.5	2,646	5.2	0.544
Zambia	24.2	3,526	4.3	0.584
Zimbabwe	18.7	2,896	4.2	0.571

== Economic sectors and industries ==
Because Africa's export portfolio remains predominantly based on raw material, its export earnings are contingent on commodity price fluctuations. This exacerbates the continent's susceptibility to external shocks and bolsters the need for export diversification. Trade in services, mainly travel and tourism, continued to rise in year 2012, underscoring the continent's strong potential in this sphere.

=== Agriculture ===
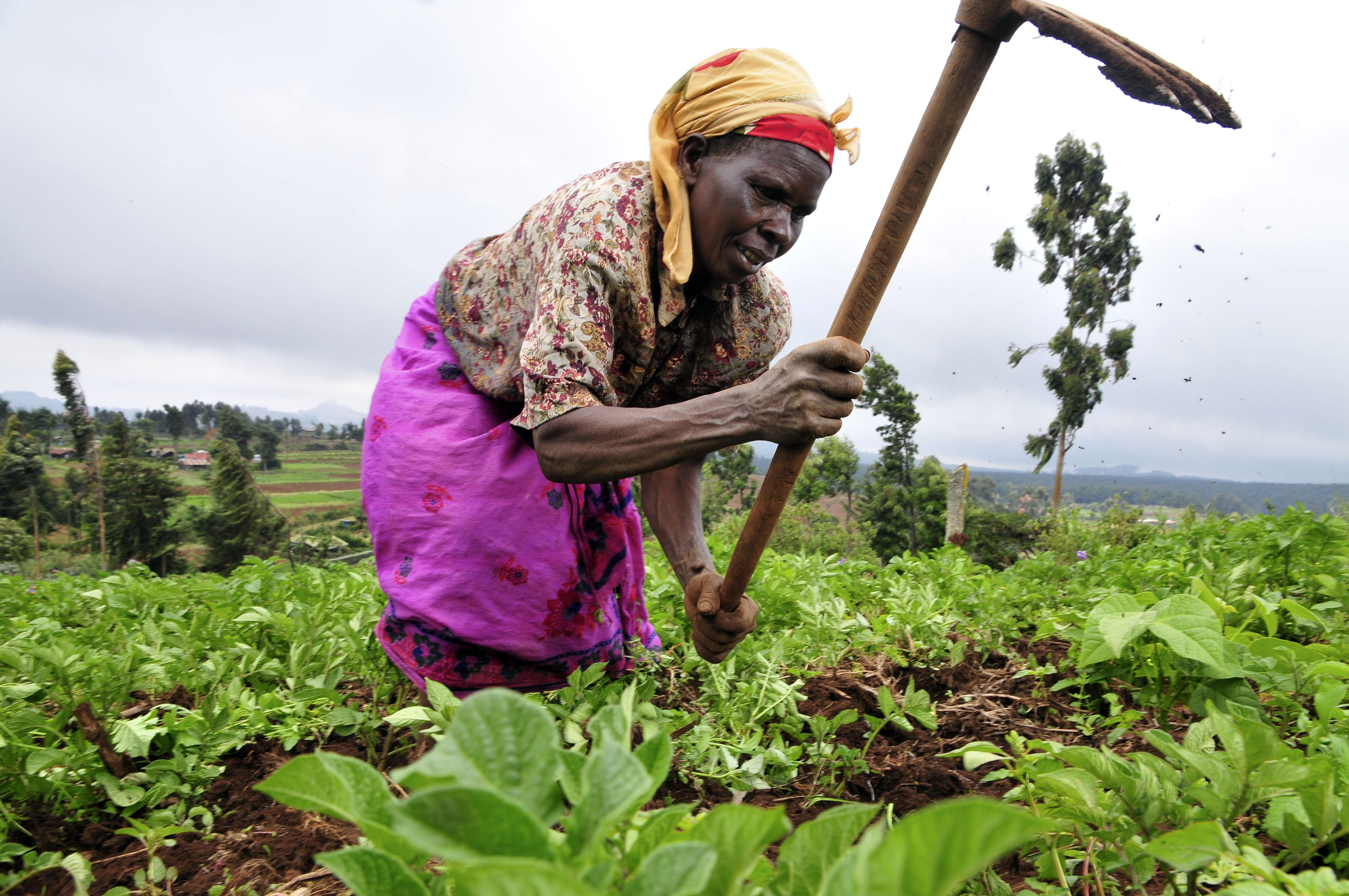
A Mount Kenya region farmer, 2010

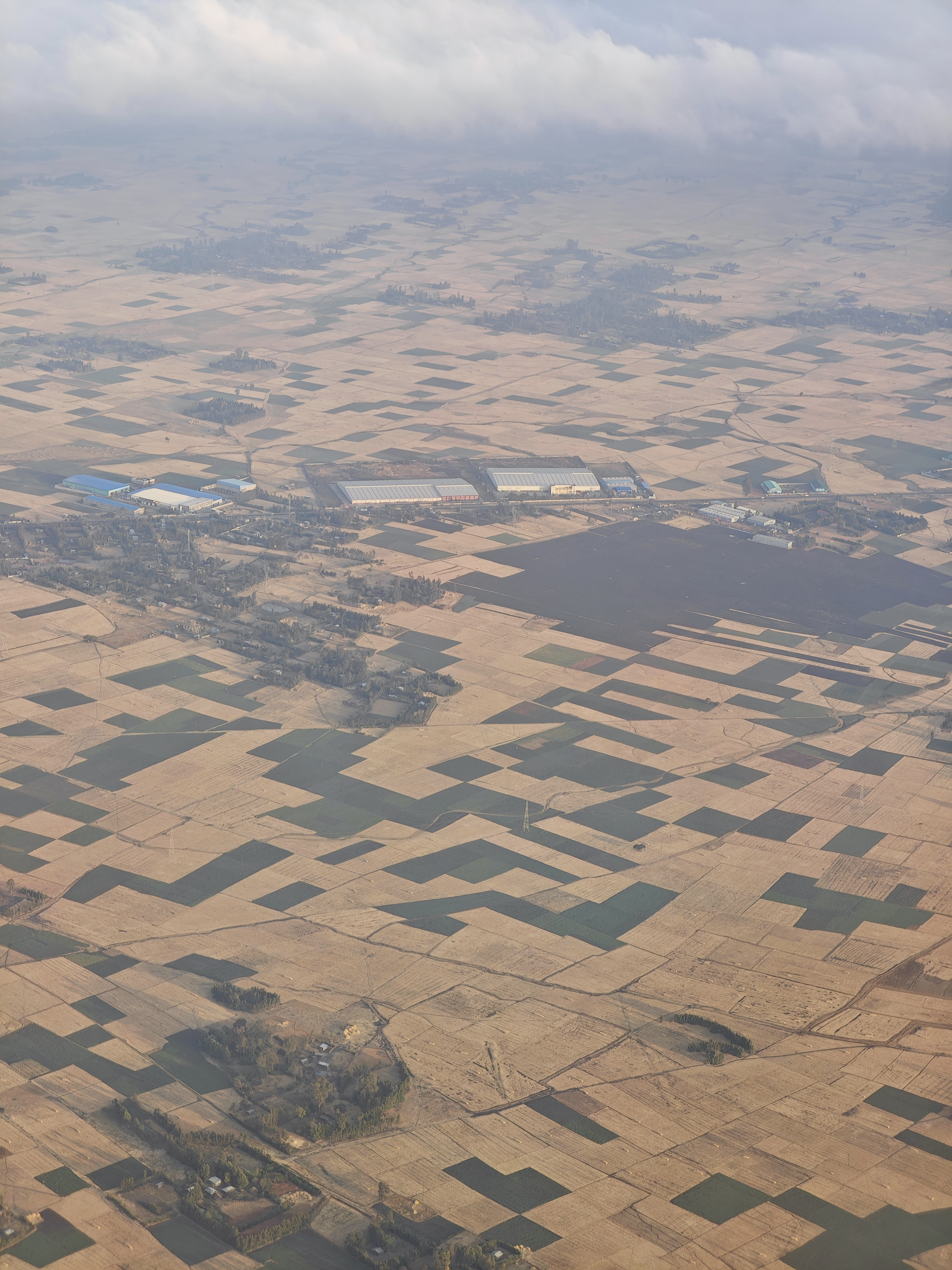
Aerial view of agricultural fields in Ethiopia in 2025

48% of working people in Africa work in agriculture, the highest in the world. The situation whereby African nations export crops to the West while millions on the continent starve has been blamed on the economic policies of the developed countries. These advanced nations protect their own agricultural sectors with high import tariffs and offer government subsidies to their farmers. which many contend leads the overproduction of such commodities as grain, cotton and milk. The impact of agricultural subsidies in developed countries upon developing-country farmers and international development is well documented. Agricultural subsidies can help drive prices down to benefit consumers, but also mean that unsubsidised developing-country farmers have a more difficult time competing in the world market; and the effects on poverty are particularly negative when subsidies are provided for crops that are also grown in developing countries since developing-country farmers must then compete directly with subsidised developed-country farmers, for example in cotton and sugar. The IFPRI has estimated in 2003 that the impact of subsidies costs developing countries $24 billion in lost incomes going to agricultural and agro-industrial production; and more than $40Bn is displaced from net agricultural exports. The result of this is that the global price of such products is continually reduced until Africans are unable to compete, except for cash crops that do not grow easily in a northern climate.

In recent years countries such as Brazil, which has experienced progress in agricultural production, have agreed to share technology with Africa to increase agricultural production in the continent to make it a more viable trade partner. Increased investment in African agricultural technology in general has the potential to reduce poverty in Africa. The demand market for African cocoa has experienced a price boom in 2008. The Nigerian, South African and Ugandan governments have targeted policies to take advantage of the increased demand for certain agricultural products and plan to stimulate agricultural sectors. The African Union has plans to heavily invest in African agriculture and the situation is closely monitored by the UN.

Ticks are a constant pressure on the continent's livestock. Although acaricides have been commonly used by farmers here, they are becoming less effective. Tick vaccines are under development and may fill this void.

=== Energy ===
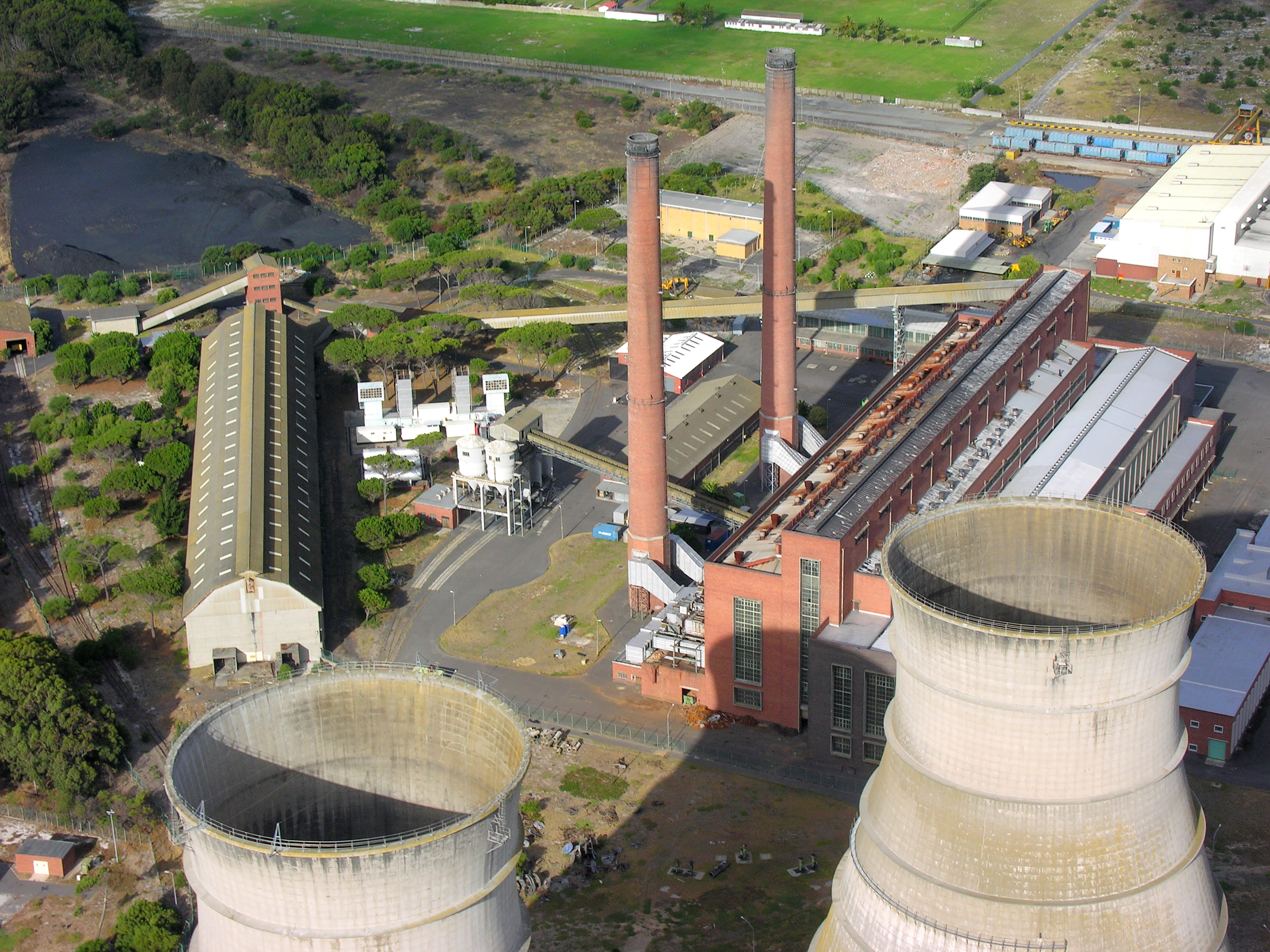
The Athlone Power Station in Cape Town, South Africa in 2007

Africa has significant resources for generating energy in several forms (hydroelectric, reserves of petroleum and gas, coal production, uranium production, renewable energy such as solar, wind and geothermal). The lack of development and infrastructure means that little of this potential is actually in use today. The largest consumers of electric power in Africa are South Africa, Libya, Namibia, Egypt, Tunisia, and Zimbabwe, which each consume between 1000 and 5000 KWh/m^{2} per person, in contrast with African states such as Ethiopia, Eritrea, and Tanzania, where electricity consumption per person is negligible.

Petroleum and petroleum products are the main export of 14 African countries. Petroleum and petroleum products accounted for a 46.6% share of Africa's total exports in 2010; the second largest export of Africa as a whole is natural gas, in its gaseous state and as liquified natural gas, accounting for a 6.3% share of Africa's exports. Only South Africa is using nuclear power commercially.

=== Infrastructure ===
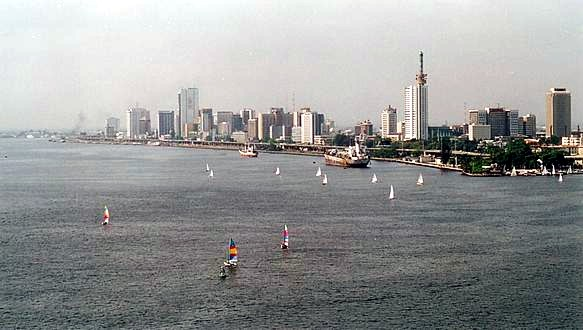
Lagos, Nigeria, Africa's largest city, 2007

Lack of infrastructure creates barriers for African businesses. Although it has many ports, a lack of supporting transportation infrastructure adds 30–40% to costs, in contrast to Asian ports.

Railway projects were important in mining districts from the late 19th century. Large railway and road projects characterize the late 19th century. Railroads were emphasized in the colonial era, and roads in 'post-colonial' times. Jedwab & Storeygard find that in 1960–2015 there were strong correlations between transportation investments and economic development. Influential political include pre-colonial centralization, ethnic fractionalization, European settlement, natural resource dependence, and democracy.

Many large infrastructure projects are underway across Africa. By far, most of these projects are in the production and transportation of electric power. Many other projects include paved highways, railways, airports, and other construction.

Telecommunications infrastructure is also a growth area in Africa. Although Internet penetration lags other continents, it has still reached 9%. As of 2011, it was estimated that 500,000,000 mobile phones of all types were in use in Africa, including 15,000,000 "smart phones".

=== Mining and drilling ===
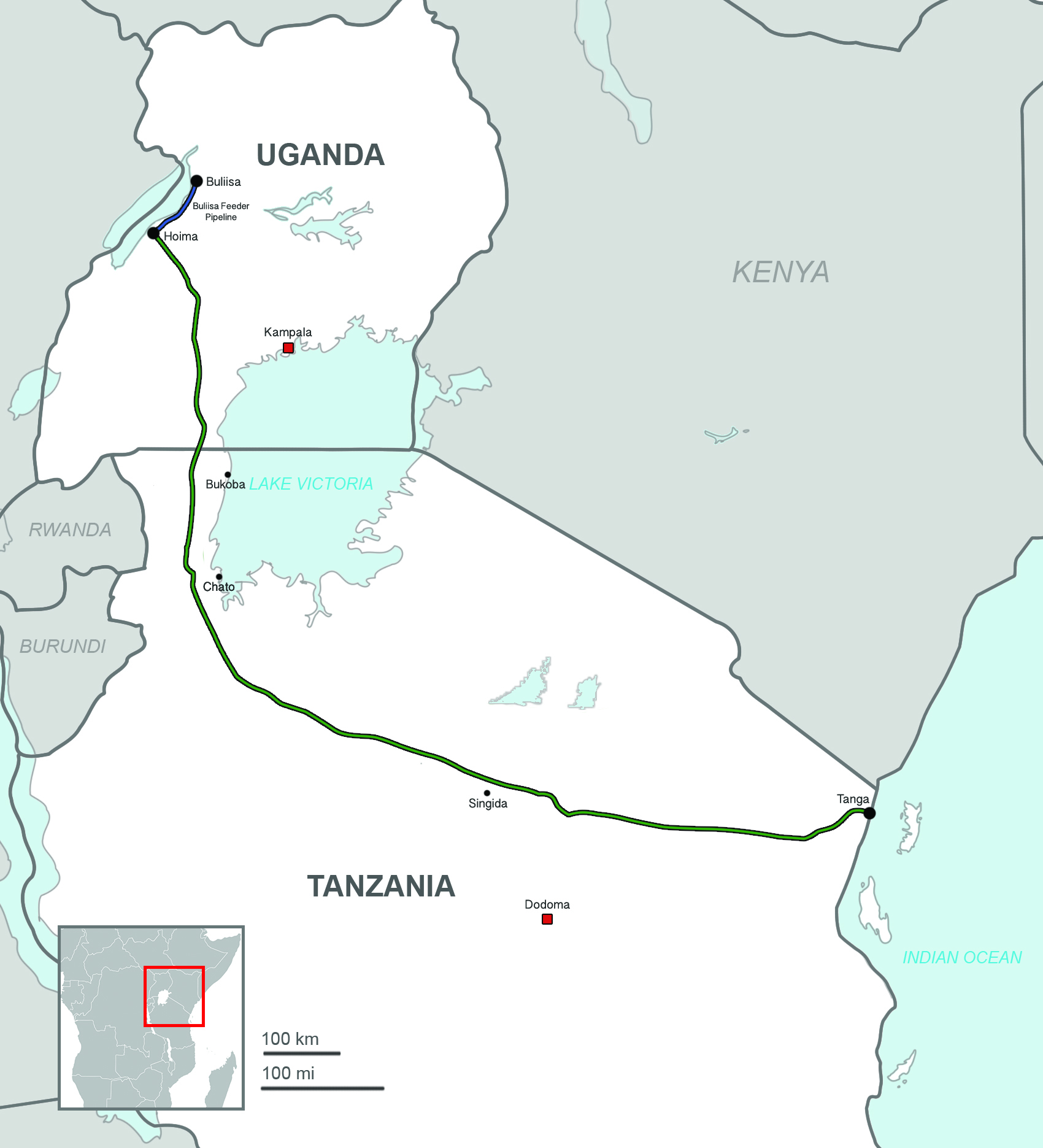
Tanzania and Uganda Pipeline, $5 billion project

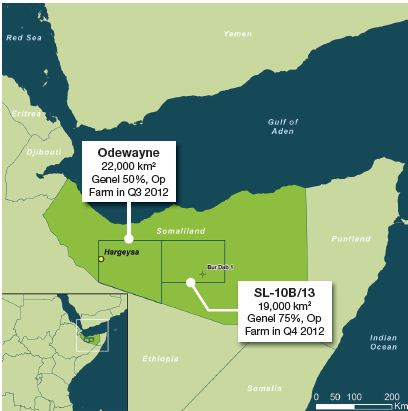
Somaliland crude oil Genel Energy concession schematic. Somaliland estimates crude at 30Bn barrels targets of exploration and production in 2024-2025.

The mineral industry of Africa is one of the largest mineral industries in the world. Africa is the second biggest continent, with 30 million km^{2} of land, which implies large quantities of resources. For many African countries, mineral exploration and production constitute significant parts of their economies and remain keys to future economic growth. Africa is richly endowed with mineral reserves and ranks first or second in quantity of world reserves of bauxite, cobalt, industrial diamond, phosphate rock, platinum-group metals (PGM), vermiculite, and zirconium.

African mineral reserves rank first or second for bauxite, cobalt, diamonds, phosphate rocks, platinum-group metals (PGM), vermiculite, and zirconium. Many other minerals are also present in quantity. The 2005 share of world production from African soil is the following: bauxite 9%; aluminium 5%; chromite 44%; cobalt 57%; copper 5%; gold 21%; iron ore 4%; steel 2%; lead (Pb) 3%; manganese 39%; zinc 2%; cement 4%; natural diamond 46%; graphite 2%; phosphate rock 31%; coal 5%; mineral fuels (including coal) & petroleum 13%; uranium 16%.

Since Africa is home to large reserves of the minerals needed for the ongoing energy transition, i.e. the transition to renewable energy technologies, the predicted increase in global demand for these critical minerals could become a driver of sustainable economic development on the continent, not least for the mineral-rich countries of Africa. The African Union has outlined a policy framework, the Africa Mining Vision, to leverage the continent's mineral reserves in pursuit of sustainable development and socio-economic transformation. A key ambition in this vision is to transform Africa's economies from today's high levels of commodity export to a larger share of industrial manufacturing of higher value-added products, an ambition that will require investments in capacity building, research and development.

=== Manufacturing ===
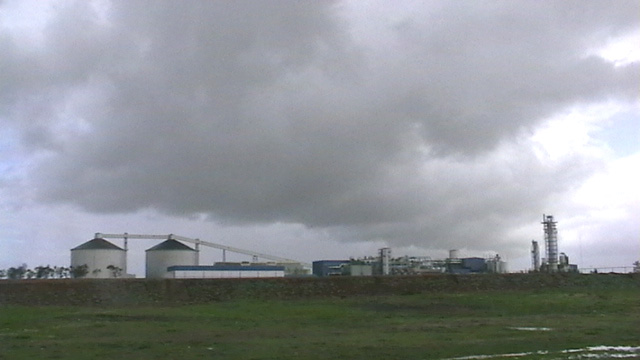
The Soucreye sugar factory in Sidi Bennour (Doukkala), Morocco

Both the African Union and the United Nations have outlined plans in modern years on how Africa can help itself industrialize and develop significant manufacturing sectors to levels proportional to the African economy in the 1960s with 21st-century technology. This focus on growth and diversification of manufacturing and industrial production, as well as diversification of agricultural production, has fueled hopes that the 21st century will prove to be a century of economic and technological growth for Africa. This hope, coupled with the rise of new leaders in Africa in the future, inspired the term "the African Century", referring to the 21st century potentially being the century when Africa's vast untapped labor, capital, and resource potentials might become a world player. This hope in manufacturing and industry is helped by the boom in communications technology and local mining industry in much of sub-Saharan Africa. Namibia has attracted industrial investments in recent years and South Africa has begun offering tax incentives to attract foreign direct investment projects in manufacturing.

Countries such as Mauritius have plans for developing new "green technology" for manufacturing. Developments such as this have huge potential to open new markets for African countries as the demand for alternative "green" and clean technology is predicted to soar in the future as global oil reserves dry up and fossil fuel-based technology becomes less economically viable.

Nigeria in recent years has been embracing industrialization, It currently has an indigenous vehicle manufacturing company, Innoson Vehicle Manufacturing (IVM), which manufactures rapid transit buses, trucks and SUVs, with an upcoming introduction of cars. Their various brands of vehicle are currently available in Nigeria, Ghana and other West African Nations. Nigeria also has few electronic manufacturers like Zinox, the first branded Nigerian computer, and electronic gadgets (like tablet PCs) manufacturers. In 2013, Nigeria introduced a policy regarding import duty on vehicles to encourage local manufacturing companies in the country. In this regard, some foreign vehicle manufacturing companies like Nissan have made known their plans to have manufacturing plants in Nigeria. Apart from electronics and vehicles, most consumer, pharmaceutical and cosmetic products, building materials, textiles, home tools, plastics and so on are also manufactured in the country and exported to other west African and African countries. Nigeria is currently the largest manufacturer of cement in Sub-saharan Africa. and Dangote Cement Factory, Obajana is the largest cement factory in sub-saharan Africa. Ogun is considered to be Nigeria's industrial hub (as most factories are located in Ogun and even more companies are moving there), followed by Lagos.

The manufacturing sector is small but growing in East Africa. The main industries are textile and clothing, leather processing, agribusiness, chemical products, electronics and vehicles. East African countries like Uganda also produce motorcycles for the domestic market.

=== Investment and banking ===
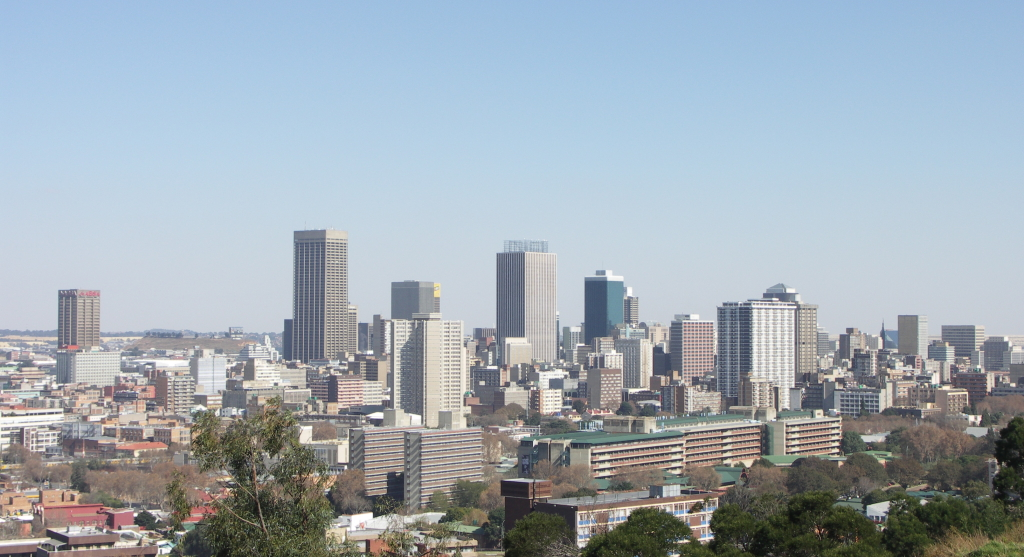
Many financial firms have offices in downtown Johannesburg, South Africa.

China and India have shown increasing interest in emerging African economies in the 21st century. Reciprocal investment between Africa and China increased dramatically in recent years amidst the current world financial crisis.

The increased investment in Africa by China has attracted the attention of the European Union and has provoked talks of competitive investment by the EU. Members of the African diaspora abroad, especially in the EU and the United States, have increased efforts to use their businesses to invest in Africa and encourage African investment abroad in the European economy.

Remittances from the African diaspora and rising interest in investment from the West will be especially helpful for Africa's least developed and most devastated economies, such as Burundi, Togo and Comoros. However, experts lament the high fees involved in sending remittances to Africa due to a duopoly of Western Union and MoneyGram that is controlling Africa's remittance market, making Africa is the most expensive cash transfer market in the world. According to some experts, the high processing fees involved in sending money to Africa are hampering African countries' development.

Remittances continue to be the most important source of external financial flows to Africa, accounting for 3.8% of GDP in 2021. However, only approximately 30% of it is dedicated to economic activities, the majority of which are in the informal sector, limiting its potential for productive transformation.

Angola has announced interests in investing in the EU, Portugal in particular. South Africa has attracted increasing attention from the United States as a new frontier of investment in manufacture, financial markets and small business, as has Liberia in recent years under their new leadership.

There are two African currency unions: the West African Banque Centrale des États de l'Afrique de l'Ouest (BCEAO) and the Central African Banque des États de l'Afrique Centrale (BEAC). Both use the CFA franc as their legal tender. The idea of a single currency union across Africa has been floated, and plans exist to have it established by 2020, though many issues, such as bringing continental inflation rates below 5 percent, remain hurdles in its finalization. In February 2024, following a large-scale trafficking of currency devices, the West African Monetary Union (UEMOA) and the Economic and Monetary Community of Central Africa (CEMAC), responsible for the monetary management of the CFA franc zone, and the Bank of France, which produces CFA franc coins, these central banks want to equip the CFA franc coins with a new alloy guaranteeing the security of the monetary circuit of the CFA franc zone, according to the International Copper Study Group (ICSG), the metal used to manufacture CFA franc coins, is prized because of its market value, The Economic and Monetary Community of Central Africa opened the first investigations in 2019, after noting the disappearance of the first CFA franc currency devices within the organization.

==== Stock exchanges ====
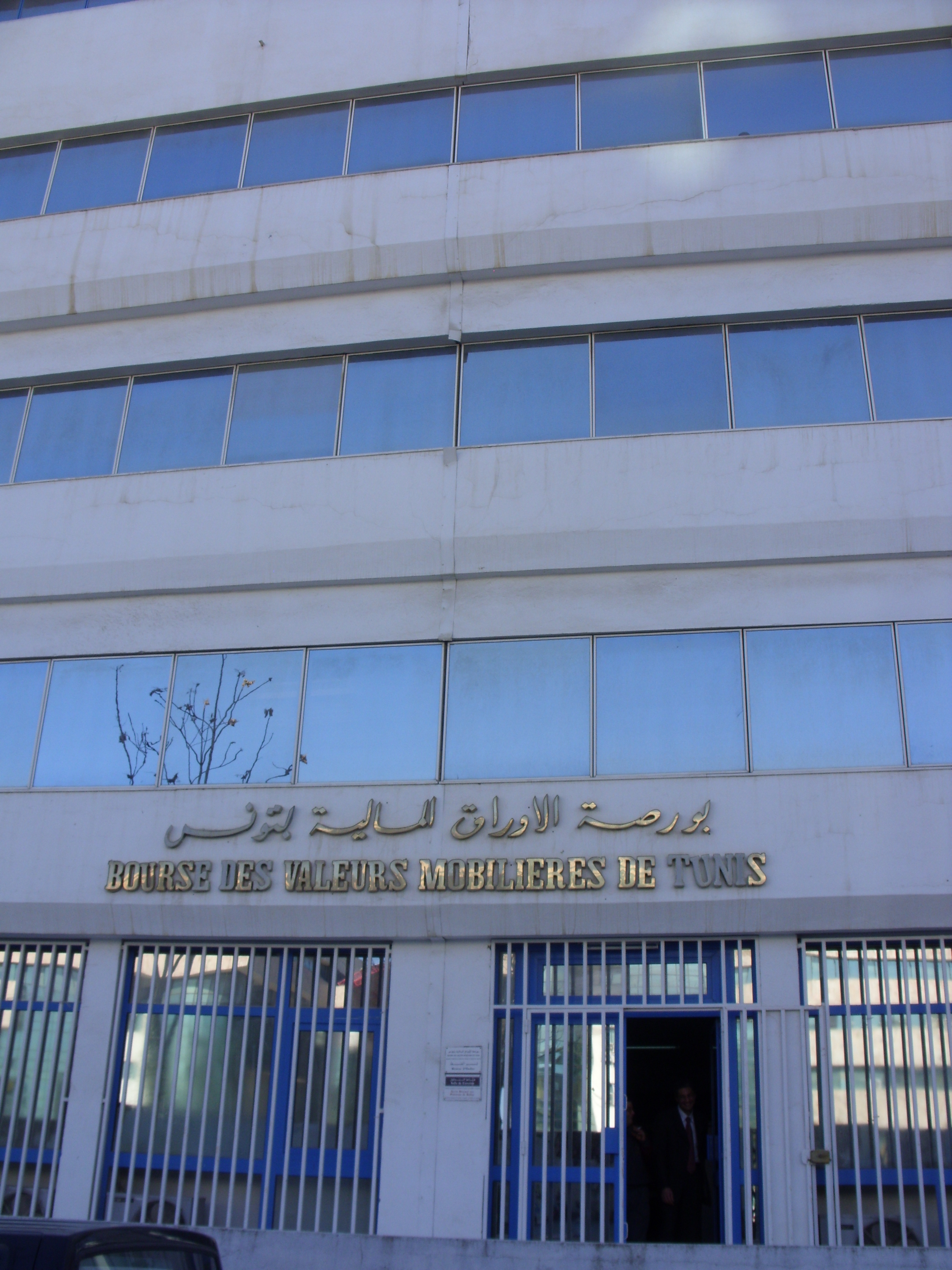
The Bourse de Tunis headquarters in Tunis, Tunisia

As of 2012, Africa has 23 stock exchanges, twice as many as it had 20 years earlier. Nonetheless, African stock exchanges still account for less than 1% of the world's stock exchange activity. The top ten stock exchanges in Africa by stock capital are (amounts are given in billions of United States dollars): but nowadays there are around 29 stock exchanges in Africa:

- South Africa (82.88)(2014)
- Egypt ($73.04 billion (30 November 2014 est.))
- Morocco (5.18)
- Nigeria (5.11) (actually has a market capitalisation value of $39.27 Bn)
- Kenya (1.33)
- Tunisia (0.88)
- BRVM (regional stock exchange whose members include Benin, Burkina Faso, Guinea-Bissau, Ivory Coast, Mali, Niger, Senegal and Togo: 6.6)
- Mauritius (0.55)
- Botswana (0.43)
- Ghana (.38)

African stock exchanges
Stock exchange name	City	Country	Year founded	Currency	Value in USD
Angola Debt and Stock Exchange	Luanda	Angola	1995	Angolan kwanza	
Botswana Stock Exchange	Gaborone	Botswana	1995	Botswana pula	
Cape Town Stock Exchange	Cape Town	South Africa	2016	South Africa rand	
Eswatini Stock Exchange	Mbabane	Eswatini	1990	Eswatini lilangeni	
Ethiopian Securities Exchange	Addis Ababa	Ethiopia	2025	Ethiopian birr	
Johannesburg Stock Exchange Limited	Johannesburg	South Africa	1887	South Africa rand	
Lusaka Stock Exchange	Lusaka	Zambia	1994	Zambian kwacha	
Malawi Stock Exchange	Blantyre	Malawi	1996	Malawi kwacha	
Namibian Stock Exchange	Windhoek	Namibia	1904	Namibian dollar	
Rwanda Stock Exchange	Kigali	Rwanda	2011	Rwandan franc	
Victoria Falls Stock Exchange	Victoria Falls	Zimbabwe	2020	United States dollar	
Zimbabwe Stock Exchange	Harare	Zimbabwe	1896	Zimbabwe dollar	

Between 2009 and 2012, a total of 72 companies were launched on the stock exchanges of 13 African countries.

== See also ==
- United Nations Economic Commission for Africa
- Africa–China economic relations
- African Economic Community
- African Economic Outlook
- Demographics of Africa
- Economic history of Africa
- Economy of East Africa
- List of largest companies in Africa by revenue
- Land grabbing
- Languages of Africa
- List of countries by percentage of population living in poverty
- List of countries by Human Development Index
- Central banks and currencies of Africa
- List of countries by credit rating
- List of countries by future gross government debt
- List of countries by public debt
- List of countries by leading trade partners
- List of countries by industrial production growth rate
- List of countries by GDP (nominal)
- List of countries by GDP (nominal) per capita
- List of countries by GDP (PPP)
- List of countries by GDP (PPP) per capita
- List of countries by GNI (nominal) per capita
- List of countries by tax revenue as percentage of GDP
- List of countries by GDP growth
