= African Economic Community =

International organization

The African Economic Community (AEC) is an organization of African Union states establishing grounds for mutual economic development among the majority of African states. The stated goals of the organization include the creation of free trade areas, customs unions, a single market, a central bank, and a common currency (see African Monetary Union) thus establishing an economic and monetary union.

== Goals ==
The AEC founded through the Abuja Treaty, signed in 1991 and entered into force in 1994 is envisioned to be created in six stages:

1. (completed in 1999) Creation of regional blocs in regions where such do not yet exist
2. (completed in 2007) Strengthening of intra-REC integration and inter-REC harmonisation
3. (completed in 2021) Establishing of a free trade area and customs union in each regional bloc
4. (to be completed in 2023) Establishing of a continent-wide customs union (and thus also a free trade area)
5. (to be completed in 2025) Establishing of a continent-wide African Common Market (ACM)
6. (to be completed in 2028) Establishing of a continent-wide economic and monetary union (and thus also a currency union) and Parliament

- End of all transition periods: 2034 at the latest

=== Stages progress ===
as of September 2007

- Stage 1: Completed, only Arab Maghreb Union members and Sahrawi Republic not participating. Somalia is participating, but no practical implementation yet.
- Stage 2: Steady progress, nothing factual to check.
- Stage 3:

| | Regional blocs - pillars of the African Economic Community (AEC) |
| Activity | CEN-SAD | COMESA | EAC | ECCAS | | ECOWAS | | | IGAD | SADC | | UMA |
| Activity | CEN-SAD | COMESA | EAC | CEMAC | Common | UEMOA | WAMZ | Common | IGAD | SACU | Common | UMA |
|---|---|---|---|---|---|---|---|---|---|---|---|---|
| Free Trade Area | stalled | progressing ^{1} | fully in force | fully in force | proposed for 2007 ? | fully in force | | proposed | stalled | fully in force | progressing ^{2} | stalled |
| Customs Union | stalled | proposed for 2008 | fully in force | fully in force | proposed for 2011 ? | fully in force | | proposed for 2007 | stalled | fully in force | proposed for 2010 | stalled |

^{1} Members not yet participating: DR Congo (in talks to join), Eritrea, Ethiopia, Seychelles (in talks to join), Swaziland (on derogation until SACU gives permission for Swaziland to join the FTA), Uganda (to join very soon)
^{2} Members not yet participating: Angola, DR Congo, Seychelles

- Stage 4: In March 2018, 49 African countries signed the African Continental Free Trade Agreement paving the way for a continent-wide free trade area. The continental free trade area became operational in July 2019, after 22 ratifications. As of late 2025, 50 signatories had ratified the treaty and become parties to it.
- Stage 5: no progress yet
- Stage 6: no progress yet

=== Overall progress ===
Members of the AEC's parent, the African Union

| | | Activities |
| Regional bloc | | Free Trade Area | Economic and monetary union | | | Free Travel | | Political pact | Defence pact |
| Regional bloc | | Free Trade Area | Customs Union | Single Market | Currency Union | Visa-free | Border-less | Political pact | Defence pact |
|---|---|---|---|---|---|---|---|---|---|
| AEC | | Partially In Force | proposed for 2023 | proposed for 2023 | proposed for 2028 | proposed for 2023 | proposed for 2023 | proposed for 2028 | proposed for 2028 |
| CEN-SAD | | proposed for 2010 |
| COMESA | | in force ^{1} | proposed for 2008 | ? | proposed for 2018 |
| EAC | | in force | in force | proposed for 2015 | proposed for 2024 | proposed for 2018 | ? | proposed for 2023 |
| ECCAS | CEMAC | in force | in force | ? | in force |
| ECCAS | Common | proposed for 2007 ? | proposed for 2011 ? | proposed | proposed | proposed | ? | | in force |
| ECOWAS | UEMOA | in force | in force | proposed | in force |
| ECOWAS | WAMZ | | | ? | proposed for 2012 |
| ECOWAS | Common | proposed ^{2} | proposed for 2007 | proposed | proposed | in force ^{1} | proposed | proposed | in force |
| IGAD |
| SADC | SACU | in force | in force | | de facto in force ^{1} | ? |
| SADC | Common | proposed for 2008 ^{3} | proposed for 2010 | proposed for 2015 | proposed for 2016 |
| UMA |

^{1} not all members participating yet
^{2} telecommunications, transport and energy - proposed
^{3} sensitive goods to be covered from 2012

African Economic Community
| Pillar regional blocs (REC) | Area (km²) | Population | GDP (PPP) ($US) | | Member states |
| Pillar regional blocs (REC) | Area (km²) | Population | (millions) | (per capita) | Member states |
|---|---|---|---|---|---|
| EAC | 5,449,717 | 349,966,685 | 737,420 | 2,149 | 8 |
| ECOWAS/CEDEAO | 5,112,903 | 349,154,000 | 1,322,452 | 3,788 | 15 |
| IGAD | 5,233,604 | 294,197,387 | 225,049 | 1,197 | 7 |
| AMU/UMA ^{4} | 6,046,441 | 106,919,526 | 1,299,173 | 12,628 | 5 |
| ECCAS/CEEAC | 6,667,421 | 218,261,591 | 175,928 | 1,451 | 11 |
| SADC | 9,882,959 | 394,845,175 | 737,392 | 3,152 | 15 |
| COMESA | 12,873,957 | 406,102,471 | 735,599 | 1,811 | 20 |
| CEN-SAD ^{4} | 14,680,111 | | | | 29 |
| Total AEC | 29,910,442 | 853,520,010 | 2,053,706 | 2,406 | 54 |
| Other regional blocs | Area (km²) | Population | GDP (PPP) ($US) | | Member states |
| Other regional blocs | Area (km²) | Population | (millions) | (per capita) | Member states |
| WAMZ ^{1} | 1,602,991 | 264,456,910 | 1,551,516 | 5,867 | 6 |
| SACU ^{1} | 2,693,418 | 51,055,878 | 541,433 | 10,605 | 5 |
| CEMAC ^{2} | 3,020,142 | 34,970,529 | 85,136 | 2,435 | 6 |
| UEMOA ^{1} | 3,505,375 | 80,865,222 | 101,640 | 1,257 | 8 |
| UMA ^{2} ^{4} | 5,782,140 | 84,185,073 | 491,276 | 5,836 | 5 |
| GAFTA ^{3} ^{4} | 5,876,960 | 1,662,596 | 6,355 | 3,822 | 5 |
| AES | 2,780,159 | 71,374,000 | 179,347 | | 3 |
During 2004. Sources: The World Factbook 2005, IMF WEO Database. Smallest value among the blocs compared. Largest value among the blocs compared.^{1}: Economic bloc inside a pillar REC.^{2}: Proposed for pillar REC, but objecting participation.^{3}: Non-African members of GAFTA are excluded from figures.^{4}: The area 446,550 km^{2} used for Morocco excludes all disputed territories, while 710,850 km^{2} would include the Moroccan-claimed and partially-controlled parts of Western Sahara (claimed as the Sahrawi Arab Democratic Republic by the Polisario Front). Morocco also claims Ceuta and Melilla, making up about 22.8 km^{2} (8.8 sq mi) more claimed territory.

== Pillars ==
Currently there are multiple regional blocs in Africa, also known as Regional Economic Communities (RECs), many of which have overlapping memberships. The RECs consist primarily of trade blocs and, in some cases, some political and military cooperation. Most of these RECs form the "pillars" of AEC, many of which also have an overlap in some of their member states. Due to this high proportion of overlap it is likely that some states with several memberships will eventually drop out of one or more RECs. Several of these pillars also contain subgroups with tighter customs and/or monetary unions of their own:

These pillars and their corresponding subgroups are as follows:

| Pillars | Subgroups |
|---|---|
| Community of Sahel-Saharan States (CEN-SAD) | |
| Common Market for Eastern and Southern Africa (COMESA) | |
| East African Community (EAC) | |
| Economic Community of Central African States (ECCAS/CEEAC) | Economic and Monetary Community of Central Africa (CEMAC) |
| Economic Community of West African States (ECOWAS) | West African Economic and Monetary Union (UEMOA) West African Monetary Zone (WAMZ) |
| Intergovernmental Authority on Development (IGAD) | |
| Southern African Development Community (SADC) | Southern African Customs Union (SACU); Common Monetary Area (CMA) |
| Arab Maghreb Union (UMA) | |

=== Pillar membership ===
member states; year of joining
member states; year of joining; cooperation in the framework of the bloc stalled
candidate states; year of application

CEN-SAD
Founding states (1998):
- Burkina Faso
- Chad
- Libya
- Mali
- Niger
- Sudan

Joined later:

- 1999: Central African Republic
- 1999: Eritrea
- 2000: Djibouti
- 2000: Gambia
- 2000: Senegal
- 2001: Egypt
- 2001: Morocco
- 2001: Nigeria
- 2001: Somalia
- 2001: Tunisia
- 2002: Benin
- 2002: Togo
- 2004: Ivory Coast
- 2004: Guinea-Bissau
- 2004: Liberia
- 2005: Ghana
- 2005: Sierra Leone
- 2007: Comoros
- 2007: Guinea
- 2008: Kenya
- 2008: Mauritania
- 2008: São Tomé and Príncipe
- 2009: Cape Verde

COMESA
Founding states (1994):
- Burundi
- Comoros
- Democratic Republic of the Congo
- Djibouti
- Eritrea
- Ethiopia
- Kenya
- Madagascar
- Malawi
- Mauritius
- Rwanda
- Sudan
- Eswatini
- Uganda
- Zambia
- Zimbabwe

Joined later:

- 1999: Egypt
- 2001: Seychelles
- 2005: Libya
- 2018: Tunisia
- 2018: Somalia
Former members:
- 1994-1997: Lesotho
- 1994-1997: Mozambique
- 1994-2001: Tanzania
- 1994-2004: Namibia
- 1994-2007: Angola

EAC
Founding states (2001):
- Kenya
- Tanzania
- Uganda

Joined later:

- 2007: Burundi
- 2007: Rwanda
- 2016: South Sudan
- 2022: Democratic Republic of the Congo

ECOWAS
Founding states (1975):
- Benin ^{UEMOA-94}
- Burkina Faso ^{UEMOA-94}
- Ivory Coast ^{UEMOA-94}
- Gambia ^{WAMZ-00}
- Ghana ^{WAMZ-00}
- Guinea ^{WAMZ-00}
- Guinea-Bissau ^{UEMOA-97}
- Liberia ^{WAMZ-10}
- Mali ^{UEMOA-94}
- Niger ^{UEMOA-94}
- Nigeria ^{WAMZ-00}
- Senegal ^{UEMOA-94}
- Sierra Leone ^{WAMZ-00}
- Togo ^{UEMOA-94}

Joined later:

- 1977: Cape Verde
Former members:
- 1975-1999: Mauritania
UEMOA-94: UEMOA state from 1994

UEMOA-97: UEMOA state from 1997
WAMZ-00: WAMZ state from 2000

WAMZ-10: WAMZ state from 2010

ECCAS
Founding states (1985):
- Burundi
- Cameroon ^{CEMAC-99}
- Central African Republic ^{CEMAC-99}
- Chad ^{CEMAC-99}
- Congo ^{CEMAC-99}
- DR Congo
- Equatorial Guinea ^{CEMAC-99}
- Gabon ^{CEMAC-99}
- Rwanda ^{withdrawn 2007-2016}
- São Tomé and Príncipe

Joined later:

- 1999: Angola
CEMAC-99: CEMAC state from 1999

IGAD
Founding states (1986):
- Djibouti
- Ethiopia
- Kenya
- Somalia
- Sudan
- Uganda

Joined later:

- 1993: Eritrea
- 2011: South Sudan

UMA^{1}
Founding states (1989):
- Algeria
- Libya
- Mauritania
- Morocco
- Tunisia

SADC
Founding states (1980):
- Angola
- Botswana ^{SACU-70}
- Lesotho ^{SACU-70}
- Malawi
- Mozambique
- Eswatini ^{SACU-70}
- Tanzania
- Zambia
- Zimbabwe

Joined later:

- 1990: Namibia ^{SACU-90}
- 1990: South Africa ^{SACU-70}
- 1995: Mauritius
- 1997: DR Congo
- 1997: Seychelles ^{withdrawn 2004-2007}
- 2005: Madagascar
SACU-70: SACU state from 1970
SACU-90: SACU state from 1990

^{1} The UMA (Arab Maghreb Union) does not participate in the AEC so far, because of opposition by Morocco

==== Interlocking relationships ====
The image above contains clickable links Euler diagram showing the relationships among various multinational African entities

Venn diagrams illustrating interlocking relationship overlaps:

REC pillars of the African Economic Community: CEN-SAD COMESA EAC ECCAS ECOWAS IGAD SADC UMA

Active REC pillars of the African Economic Community: COMESA EAC ECCAS ECOWAS SADC

=== Other blocs ===
Other trade blocs in Africa not part of the African Economic Community: GAFTA CEPGL COI LGA MRU

Other African regional blocs, not participating in the AEC framework (many of them predating AEC) are:

- Greater Arab Free Trade Area (GAFTA) (an organization of most Middle Eastern states, including those outside Africa)
- Economic Community of the Great Lakes Countries (CEPGL)
- Indian Ocean Commission (COI)
- Liptako–Gourma Authority (LGA)
- Mano River Union (MRU)

Their membership is as follows:

| GAFTA ^{1} | CEPGL | COI | LGA | MRU |
|---|---|---|---|---|
| 2005 membership: Egypt; Libya; Morocco; Sudan; Tunisia; Joined later: 2009:Algeria | 1976 membership: Burundi; DR Congo; Rwanda | 1984 membership: Comoros; Madagascar; Mauritius; Seychelles | 1970 membership: Burkina Faso; Mali; Niger | 1973 membership: Liberia; Sierra Leone; Joined later: 1980: Guinea; 2008: Ivory Coast |

^{1} Only African GAFTA members are listed.
GAFTA and MRU are the only blocs not currently stalled.

== African Free Trade Zone ==
The African Free Trade Zone (AFTZ) was announced on Wednesday October 22, 2008 by the heads of Southern African Development Community (SADC), the Common Market for Eastern and Southern Africa (COMESA) and the East African Community (EAC).

In May 2012 the idea was extended to also include ECOWAS, ECCAS and AMU.

== See also ==
- African Economic Outlook
- Economy of Africa
- Economy of the African Union
- CARICOM Single Market and Economy

== Sources ==
- A single African currency in our time?
- African leaders agree to form single market
- African Union Official Website
- South African webpage on RECs
- Pan-African Perspective
