= African Economic Outlook =

- Discipline: African studies, economy
- Language: English, French, Portuguese

Publication details
- History: 2002–2017
- Publisher: African Development Bank and OECD Development Centre (France)
- Frequency: Annual

Standard abbreviations
- ISO 4: Afr. Econ. Outlook

Indexing
- ISSN: 1995-3909 (print); 1999-1029 (web)
- LCCN: 2002242033
- OCLC no.: 49280667

Links
- Journal homepage

African Economic Outlook was an annual reference book-journal which focused on the economics of most African countries. It reviewed the recent economic situation and predicted the short-term interrelated economic, social, and political evolution of all African economies. The report was published by the OECD Development Centre, the African Development Bank, the United Nations Development Programme and United Nations Economic Commission for Africa. It was established in 2002 and discontinued in 2017.

== Scope ==
This annual publication covered economic policy, conditions, and outlook for most of the economies of Africa. It included macroeconomic forecasting for the current and the following year, combined with an analysis of its social and political context. Comparative synthesis of the prospects for African countries in the context of global economics is part of this periodical. Finally, a statistical appendix currently has 24 tables comparing economic and social variables across all the countries of Africa.

For example, topic coverage included the international environment, macroeconomic performances in Africa, structural changes, economic reforms, external financial flows to Africa, assessment of privatization policies, and reduction of poverty as a challenge for the future. Moreover, coverage includes governance, political issues, regional trade policies, and regional integration.

== See also ==
- African Economic Community
- Economy of the African Union
