= Community of Sahel–Saharan States =

Free trade area in Africa

Community of Sahel–Saharan States تجمع دول الساحل والصحراء Communauté des Etats Sahélo-Sahariens Comunidade dos Estados Sahelo-Saarianos
- Emblem

- Founding members Countries joining later
- Headquarters: (Libya) Tripoli
- Official languages: Arabic; English; French; Portuguese
- Type: Trade bloc
- Membership: 25 states: Benin; Burkina Faso; Central African Republic; Chad; Comoros; Djibouti; Egypt; Eritrea; Gambia; Ghana; Guinea; Guinea-Bissau; Ivory Coast; Libya; Mali; Mauritania; Morocco; Niger; Nigeria; Senegal; Sierra Leone; Somalia; Sudan; Togo; Tunisia; Former Members: Cape Verde; Kenya; Liberia; São Tomé and Príncipe

Leaders
  - Executive Secretary: Abderrahim Kadmiri (acting)

Establishment
  - Agreement signed: 4 February 1998

Area
  - Total: 14,300,000 km^{2} (5,500,000 sq mi)
- GDP (PPP): estimate
  - Total: $1,350.7 billion (2014)
  - Per capita: $1,363.8 (2014)
- Website https://censad.int/

The Community of Sahel–Saharan States (CEN-SAD; تجمع دول الساحل والصحراء; Communauté des Etats Sahélo-Sahariens; Comunidade dos Estados Sahelo-Saarianos) aims to create a free trade area within a region of Africa. There are questions with regard to whether its level of economic integration qualifies it under the enabling clause of the General Agreement on Tariffs and Trade (GATT).

The annual ordinary session of the Conference of Heads of State and Government convenes in different Member State capitals on a rotational basis. An extraordinary session may be called upon the request of any Member State.

== Establishment ==
CEN-SAD was established in February 1998 by six countries, but since then its membership has grown to 25. One of its main goals is to achieve economic unity through the implementation of the free movement of people and goods in order to make the area occupied by member states a free trade area. At the international level, CEN-SAD gained observer status at the UN General Assembly in 2001 and concluded association and cooperation accords with the United Nations Economic Commission for Africa (ECA) and with UN specialized agencies and institutions such as UNDP, WHO, UNESCO, FAO, and the Permanent Interstate Committee for drought control in the Sahel.

All CEN-SAD member countries are also participating in other African economic unions, that have the aim to create a common African Economic Community. The envisioned Free Trade Area of CEN-SAD would be hard to practically implement, because it is overlapping with the envisioned customs unions of the Economic Community of West African States (ECOWAS/CEDEAO), ECCAS and COMESA and other trade blocs more advanced in their integration.

=== Executive Secretaries ===
No.	Image	Name	Country	Took office	Left office
1		Mohamed Al-Madani Al-Azhari	Libya	1998	2013
2		Ibrahim Sani Abani	Niger	2013	2021
3		Brigi Rafini	Niger	2021	2023
4		Ado Elhadji Abou	Niger	2023	2026
5		Abderrahim Alkadmiri	Morocco	2026	Incubment

== 2005 summit ==
At the summit of 1–2 June 2005 in Ouagadougou (Burkina Faso), the heads of state decided to create a "high authority for water, agriculture and seeds" in order to allow member countries to develop their agriculture through better control of water resources and seed selection. On the other hand, the summit to decide to study the construction of a railway line connecting Libya, Chad, Niger, with ramps to Burkina Faso, Mali and Senegal, to facilitate exchanges and to open up the CEN-SAD space. Blaise Compaoré, president of Burkina Faso, succeeded Malian President Amadou Toumani Touré as current president of CEN-SAD.

== 2007 summit ==
The African leaders sought to reconcile differences between neighbours Chad and Sudan over the Darfur conflict and boost Somalia's embattled Transitional Federal Government at a regional summit in Libya on 3 June 2007.

== 2008 summit ==
The 10th Summit of Heads of State of the Community of Sahel–Saharan States (CEN-SAD) met on 28 June 2008 in Cotonou on 18 June. Its theme was Rural Development and Food Security in the CEN-SAD area. Beninese President Yayi Boni has been elected current President of CEN-SAD for a one-year term.

== 2013 summit ==
In January 2013, the Community of Sahel–Saharan States will meet in N'Djamena, Chad. A commentator said "Morocco will likely continue its steps to take command of the organization".

== CEN-SAD Games ==
Beginning in 2009, CEN-SAD member states will take part in planned periodic international sporting and cultural festivals, known as the Community of Sahel–Saharan States Games (Jeux de la Communauté des Etats Sahélo-Sahariens). The first CEN-SAD Games were held in Niamey, Niger from 4–14 February 2009. Thirteen nations competed in Under-20 sports (athletics, basketball, judo, football, handball, table tennis and traditional wrestling) and six fields of cultural competition (song, traditional creation and inspiration dancing, painting, sculpture and photography). The second CEN-SAD Games was scheduled to take place in the Chadian capitol of N'Djamena in February 2011.

== List of members ==
Member state	Joined	Area (km^{2})	Population		GDP (PPP) ($US)		Notes (all states are also members of the United Nations and of the African Union)
Member state	Joined	Area (km^{2})	(inh.)	(date)	(millions)	(per capita)	Notes (all states are also members of the United Nations and of the African Union)
Benin	2002	114,763	10,008,749	2013 census	29,918	2,552	also member of ECOWAS/CEDEAO and UEMOA
Burkina Faso	1998–	274,200	14,017,262	2006 census	45,339	792	also member of ECOWAS/CEDEAO and UEMOA
Central African Republic	1999–	622,984	4,666,368	2019 est.	4,262	823	also member of ECCAS/CEEAC and CEMAC
Chad	1998–	1,284,000	13,670,084	2015 est.	30,000	2,428	also member of ECCAS/CEEAC and CEMAC
Comoros	2007–	1,861	850,688	2018 est.	2,446	2,799	also member of SADC and COMESA
Djibouti	2000–	23,200					also member of IGAD and COMESA
Egypt	2001–	1,010,408					also member of COMESA, candidate to AMU/UMA
Eritrea	1999–	117,600					also member of IGAD and COMESA
Gambia	2000–	10,689					also member of ECOWAS/CEDEAO and WAMZ
Ghana	2005–	239,567					also member of ECOWAS/CEDEAO and WAMZ
Guinea	2007–	245,857					also member of ECOWAS/CEDEAO and WAMZ
Guinea-Bissau	2004–	36,125					also member of ECOWAS/CEDEAO and UEMOA
Ivory Coast	2004–	322,463					also member of ECOWAS/CEDEAO and UEMOA
Libya	1998–	1,759,541	6,871,287	2019 est.			also member of AMU/UMA and COMESA
Mali	1998–	1,240,192					also member of ECOWAS/CEDEAO and UEMOA
Mauritania	2007–	1,030,000					also member of AMU/UMA
Morocco	2001–	446,550 or 710,850					also member of AMU/UMA
Niger	1998–	1,267,000					also member of ECOWAS/CEDEAO and UEMOA
Nigeria	2001–	923,769					also member of ECOWAS/CEDEAO and WAMZ
Senegal	2000–	196,712					also member of ECOWAS/CEDEAO and UEMOA
Sierra Leone	2005–	71,740	7,092,113	2015 census	12,177	1,608	also member of ECOWAS/CEDEAO and WAMZ
Somalia	2001–	637,657					also member of IGAD and COMESA
Sudan	1998–	1,886,068 (2,505,813 before 2011)	41,592,539; 30,894,000	2020 est. 2009 est.	177,678	4,232	also member of IGAD and COMESA
Togo	2002–	56,785					also member of ECOWAS/CEDEAO and UEMOA
Tunisia	2001–	163,610	11,722,038	2019 census	159,707	3,713	also member of AMU/UMA and COMESA
Total (25 members)		14,680,111 or 14,944,411					

== See also ==
- BSIC Group
