= Economic Community of the Great Lakes Countries =

Economic Community of the Great Lakes Countries Communauté Économique des Pays des Grand Lacs (French)
- Membership: Burundi; Democratic Republic of the Congo; Rwanda
- Establishment: September 20, 1976
- Website www.cepgl.org

The Economic Community of the Great Lakes Countries (ECGLC) (in French CEPGL - Communauté Économique des Pays des Grand Lacs) is an international organization established on September 20, 1976, to promote economic integration and facilitate the movement of goods and people between its three members: Burundi, the Democratic Republic of the Congo (formerly known as Zaire), and Rwanda. Its main purpose is to promote regional economic cooperation and integration. Its headquarters is located in Gisenyi, in the Rubavu District of the Eastern Province of Rwanda.

== History ==
On September 20, 1976, the presidents of Zaire (Mobutu Sese Seko), Rwanda (Juvénal Habyarimana), and Burundi (Jean-Baptiste Bagaza) signed the agreement establishing the Economic Community of the Great Lakes Countries (CEPGL) in the Rwandan city of Gisenyi.

In 1994, the crisis in Burundi and the genocide against the Tutsi in Rwanda deeply destabilized the organization. By 1996, all agreements were suspended after Zaire’s territorial sovereignty was violated by forces from the Alliance of Democratic Forces for the Liberation of Congo (AFDL) and the Rwandan Patriotic Army (RPA).

Efforts to revive the CEPGL began in 2004, initiated by Belgian Foreign Minister Louis Michel, and gathered pace in 2008. The relaunch was officially confirmed in August 2010 during a meeting between Presidents Kagame of Rwanda and Nkurunziza of Burundi.

In August 2022, representatives from eleven Central African states agreed in Yaoundé to merge three regional economic blocs—CEEAC, CEMAC, and CEPGL—into a single organization.

The CEPGL's mission is to promote regional economic integration by enabling the free movement of people, goods, and capital, while also contributing to regional security. It supports joint institutions in sectors such as finance, research, and energy.

The CEPGL controls the following institutions:

- Development Bank of the Great Lakes States (BDEGL)
- Economic Community of the Great Lakes Countries for Energy (EGL)
- Institute for Agricultural Research and Animal Husbandry (IRAZ)
- International Electricity Company of the Great Lakes Countries (SINELAC)

== See also ==
- Common Market for Eastern and Southern Africa
- East African Community
- Economic Community of Central African States
