= Economic Community of Central African States =

Economic bloc in Central Africa

Economic Community of
Central African States
(in other official languages)
Spanish	Comunidad Económica de los Estados de África Central
French	Communauté économique des États de l'Afrique Centrale
Portuguese	Comunidade Económica dos Estados da África Central
- Logo

- ECCAS and CEMAC membership in Africa. ECCAS and CEMAC ECCAS only
- Administrative center: Malabo, Equatorial Guinea
- Working languages: French; English; Portuguese; Spanish
- Type: Pillar of the African Economic Community
- Membership: 10 states: Angola; Burundi; Cameroon; Central African Republic; Chad; Democratic Republic of the Congo; Equatorial Guinea; Gabon; Republic of the Congo; São Tomé and Príncipe

Leaders
  - President of the Commission: Ezéchiel Nibigira
- Establishment: October 18, 1983

Area
  - Total: 6,640,501 km^{2} (2,563,912 sq mi) (7th)

Population
  - 2026 estimate: ▲240,811,296 (7th)
  - Density: 36.3/km^{2} (94.0/sq mi)
- GDP (PPP): 2026 estimate
  - Total: 1.074 trillion (33th)
  - Per capita: ▲$4,460 (163th)
- GDP (nominal): 2026 estimate
  - Total: ▲$433.43 billion (40th)
  - Per capita: ▲$1,799 (161st)
- HDI (2023): ▲0.536 low (169th)
- Website ceeac-eccas.org

The Economic Community of Central African States (ECCAS; French: Communauté Économique des États de l'Afrique Centrale, CEEAC; Spanish: Comunidad Económica de los Estados de África Central, CEEAC; Portuguese: Comunidade Económica dos Estados da África Central, CEEAC) is an Economic Community of the African Union that promotes regional economic co-operation in Central Africa. It "aims to achieve collective autonomy, raise the standard of living of its populations and maintain economic stability through harmonious cooperation".

== History ==
=== Foundation ===
At a summit meeting in December 1981, the leaders of the Customs and Economic Union of Central Africa (French acronym UDEAC) agreed in principle to form a wider economic community of Central African states. ECCAS was established on 18 October 1983 by the UDEAC members, São Tomé and Príncipe and the members of the Economic Community of the Great Lakes Countries (CEPGL established in 1976 by the Democratic Republic of the Congo, Burundi and Rwanda). Angola remained an observer until 1999, when it became a full member.

ECCAS began functioning in 1985, but was inactive for several years because of financial difficulties (non-payment of membership fees by the member states) and the conflict in the Great Lakes area. The war in the DR Congo was particularly divisive, as Rwanda and Angola fought on opposing sides. ECCAS has been designated a pillar of the African Economic Community (AEC), but formal contact between the AEC and ECCAS was only established in October 1999 due to the inactivity of ECCAS since 1992 (ECCAS signed the Protocol on Relations between the AEC and the regional blocs (RECs) in October 1999). The AEC again confirmed the importance of ECCAS as the major economic community in Central Africa at the third preparatory meeting of its Economic and Social Council (ECOSOC) in June 1999.

Presided over by President Pierre Buyoya of Burundi, the summit was held in Libreville on 6 February 1998. The Heads of State and Government present at the summit committed themselves to the resurrection of the organisation. The Prime Minister of Angola also indicated that his country would become a fully fledged member. The summit approved a budget of 10 million French francs for 1998 and requested the Secretariat to:

- Obtain assistance from UNECA to evaluate the operational activities of the secretariat; to evaluate the contributions due by member states; and the salaries and salary structures of employees of the secretariat
- Convene an extraordinary meeting of the Council of Ministers as soon as possible to evaluate the recommendations of UNECA; the Council should then draw up proposals for a new administrative structure for the secretariat and revised contributions due by each member state.

The summit also requested countries in the region to find lasting and peaceful solutions to their political problems. The chairman also appealed to member countries to support the complete lifting of the embargo placed on his country. During the inauguration of President Bongo of Gabon on 21 January 1999, a mini-summit of ECCAS leaders was held. The leaders discussed problems concerning the functioning of ECCAS and the creation of a third Deputy Secretary-General post, designated for Angola. Angola formally joined the Community during this summit.

=== Recent events ===
The 10th Ordinary Session of Heads of State and Government took place in Malabo in June 2002. This Summit decided to adopt a protocol on the establishment of a Network of Parliamentarians of Central Africa (REPAC) and to adopt the standing orders of the Council for Peace and Security in Central Africa (COPAX), including the Defence and Security Commission (CDS), Multinational Force of Central Africa (FOMAC) and the Early Warning Mechanism of Central Africa (MARAC). Rwanda was also officially welcomed upon its return as a full member of ECCAS.

On January 24, 2003, the European Union (EU) concluded a financial agreement with ECCAS and CEMAC, conditional on ECCAS and CEMAC merging into one organization, with ECCAS taking responsibility for the peace and security of the sub-region through its security pact COPAX. CEMAC is not one of the pillars of the African Economic Community, but its members are associated with it through Economic Community of Central African States. The EU had multiple peacekeeping missions in the DR Congo: Operation Artemis (June to September 2003), EUPOL Kinshasa (from October 2003) and EUSEC DR Congo (from May 2005).

The 11th Ordinary Session of Heads of State and Government in Brazzaville during January 2004 welcomed the fact that the Protocol Relating to the Establishment of a Council for Peace and Security in Central Africa (COPAX) had received the required number of ratifications to enter into force. The Summit also adopted a declaration on the implementation of NEPAD in Central Africa as well as a declaration on gender equality.

On September 23, 2009, pursuant to Presidential Determination 2009-26 and as published in the Federal Register / Vol. 74, No. 183 (Presidential Documents 48363) ECCAS was made eligible under the U.S. Arms Export Control Act for the furnishing of defense articles and defense services. This makes the ECCAS organization and (theoretically) the countries under their charter eligible for U.S. Foreign Military Sales Program (i.e. government to government sales and assistance) pursuant to the Arms Export Control Act and for other such U.S. assistance as directed by a USG contract to U.S. industry for such support pursuant to the (ITAR).

In 2007, Rwanda decided to leave the organisation in order to remove overlap in its membership in regional trade blocks and so that it could better focus on its membership in the EAC and COMESA. Rwanda was a founding member of the organisation and had been a part of it since 18 October 1981. It subsequently rejoined ECCAS in 2016. On 1 September 2020, Gilberto Da Piedade Verissimo of Angola was appointed President of the ECCAS Commission with Francisca Tatchouop Belobe as vice-President.

In response to the 2023 Gabonese coup d'état, the ECCAS condemned the military use of force and asked for restoration of constitutional order. It also suspended Gabon's membership in the bloc on 5 September and moved its headquarters from Libreville to Malabo, Equatorial Guinea.

On 7 June 2025, Rwanda announced its withdrawal from the ECCAS, citing the bloc's "instrumentalisation" by the Democratic Republic of the Congo.

== Economic integration ==
=== Economic and Monetary Community of Central Africa ===
The Economic and Monetary Community of Central Africa (or CEMAC from its name in French) is an organization established by Cameroon, Central African Republic, Chad, Republic of Congo, Equatorial Guinea and Gabon to promote economic integration among countries that share a common currency, the West African CFA franc.

Membership in the regional communities
Country	ECCAS	CEMAC	SADC	EAC
Angola	Yes	No	Yes	No
Burundi	Yes	No	No	Yes
Cameroon	Yes	Yes	No	No
Central African Republic	Yes	Yes	No	No
Chad	Yes	Yes	No	No
Democratic Republic of the Congo	Yes	No	Yes	Yes
Equatorial Guinea	Yes	Yes	No	No
Gabon	Yes	Yes	No	No
Republic of the Congo	Yes	Yes	No	No
São Tomé and Príncipe	Yes	No	No	No

== Objectives ==
The ultimate goal is to establish a Central African Common Market. At the Malabo Heads of State and Government Conference in 1999, four priority fields for the organization were identified:

- to develop capacities to maintain peace, security and stability - as essential prerequisites for economic and social development
- to develop physical, economic and monetary integration
- to develop a culture of human integration
- to establish an autonomous financing mechanism for ECCAS

=== Structure ===
- Conference of Heads of State and Government
- Council of Ministers
- Secretariat General (one secretary-general elected for four years and three assistant secretaries-general)
- Court of Justice
- Consultative Commission

== Treaties and protocols ==
- Treaty Establishing the Economic Community of Central African States (ECCAS)
- Protocol Establishing the Network of Parliamentarians of ECCAS (REPAC)
- Mutual Assistance Pact Between Member States of ECCAS
- Protocol Relating to the Establishment of a Mutual Security Pact in Central Africa (COPAX)

=== Appendices to the ECCAS Treaty ===
- Protocol on the Rules of Origin for products to be traded between member states of the ECCAS
- Protocol on Non-Tariff Trade Barriers
- Protocol on the Re-export of goods within the ECCAS
- Protocol on Transit and Transit facilities
- Protocol on Customs cooperation within the ECCAS
- Protocol on the Fund for Compensation for Loss of Revenue
- Protocol on Freedom of movement and Rights of Establishment of nationals of member states within the ECCAS
- Protocol on the Clearing House for the ECCAS
- Protocol on Cooperation in Agricultural development between member states of the ECCAS
- Protocol on Cooperation in Industrial development between member states of the ECCAS
- Protocol on Cooperation in Transport and Communications between member states of the ECCAS
- Protocol on Cooperation in Science and Technology between member states of the ECCAS
- Protocol on Energy cooperation between member states of the ECCAS
- Protocol on Cooperation in Natural resources between member states of the ECCAS
- Protocol on Cooperation in the development of Human resources, Education, Training and Culture between member states of the ECCAS
- Protocol on Cooperation in Tourism between member states of the ECCAS
- Protocol on the Simplification and Harmonization of Trade documents and Procedures within the ECCAS
- Protocol on the Situation of Landlocked, Semi-Landlocked, Island, Part-Island and/or Least Advanced Countries

== Peace and security activities ==
Central African states adopted a pact of non-aggression at the end of the fifth meeting of the UN Consultative Committee on Security in Central Africa held in Yaoundé, Cameroon. The pact, adopted on 9 September 1994, was arrived at after five days of meeting and discussions between military experts and ministers of Cameroon, Central African Republic, Republic of Congo, Equatorial Guinea, Gabon and São Tomé and Príncipe. At a summit conference of the United Nations Standing Advisory Committee on Security Questions in Central Africa which took place in Yaoundé on 25–26 February 1999, member states decided to create an organisation for the promotion, maintenance and consolidation of peace and security in Central Africa, which would be called the Council for Peace and Security in Central Africa (COPAX). The COPAX Protocol has now entered into force.

=== Technical organs of the COPAX council ===
- The Central African Early-Warning System (MARAC), which collects and analyses data for the early detection and prevention of crises.
- The Defence and Security Commission (CDS), which is the meeting of chiefs of staff of national armies and commanders-in-chief of police and gendarmerie forces from the different member states. Its role is to plan, organize and provide advice to the decision-making bodies of the community in order to initiate military operations if needed.
- The Multinational Force of Central Africa (FOMAC), which is a non-permanent force consisting of military contingents from member states, whose purpose is to accomplish missions of peace, security and humanitarian relief.

The standing orders for COPAX, including those of CDS, MARAC and FOMAC were adopted in June 2002 at the 10th Ordinary Summit in Malabo.

In January 2000, Gabon hosted a regional peacekeeping exercise "Gabon 2000" with the objective of increasing the capacity of ECCAS states in the field of peacekeeping and conflict prevention and management. This exercise represented a direct application of the French RECAMP-concept (reinforcement of African peacekeeping capacities).

Extraordinary Summits of both ECCAS and CEMAC took place in Libreville on 23 June 2000. Foreign ministers from 10 Central African states met in the Democratic Republic of Congo on 16 and 17 August 2001 to discuss security in their war-torn region. The meeting was sponsored by the United Nations, and only Rwanda declined to attend.

A meeting of Defence Chiefs of Staff was held in Brazzaville in October 2003, at which it was decided that a brigade-size peacekeeping force would be created in order to intervene in unstable Central African areas. This could then form one of the African Union's five planned brigades of the African Standby Force, one brigade for each region (North, West, Central, East and Southern Africa). The meeting recommended that military planners from each of the ECCAS states form a group to work out the details for the force. They also suggested the establishment of a joint peacekeeping training centre and military exercises every two years. The first of these is to take place in Chad.

=== MICOPAX ===
The Mission for the consolidation of peace in Central African Republic (MICOPAX) is a peace operation in the Central African Republic led by the ECCAS. It is involved in the Central African Republic Bush War and 2012–2013 Central African Republic conflict.

== See also ==
- Pink card system, the CEMAC motor insurance scheme
- Central African Financial Market Supervisory Commission
- Economic Community of the Great Lakes Countries (ECGLC)
- Economic Community of West African States (ECOWAS)
- Economy of Africa
- East African Community
- PREF-CEMAC
- Southern African Development Community (SADC)
- Common Market for Eastern and Southern Africa (COMESA)
- United States of Latin Africa
