= Arab Maghreb Union =

Trade agreement among North African Arab countries of the Maghreb

Arab Maghreb Union إتحاد المغرب العربي (Arabic) Ittiḥād al-Maghrib al-‘Arabī
- Emblem

- Seat of Secretariat: Rabat, Morocco
- Largest city: Casablanca, Morocco
- Official language: Arabic
- Demonym: Maghrebis
- Member states: Algeria; Libya; Mauritania; Morocco; Tunisia

Leaders
  - Secretary General: Taïeb Baccouche
- Establishment: 17 February 1989

Area
  - Total: 6,046,441 km^{2} (2,334,544 sq mi) (7th)

Population
  - 2026 estimate: 109,114,567 (13th)
  - Density: 18/km^{2} (46.6/sq mi) (217th)
- GDP (PPP): 2026 estimate
  - Total: ▲$1,792.704 trillion (27th)
  - Per capita: ▲$16,429
- GDP (nominal): 2026 estimate
  - Total: ▲$639.056 billion (28th)
  - Per capita: ▲$3,720
- Gini (2012): ▼32.8 medium inequality
- HDI (2023): ▲0.730 high (113th)
- Currency: Algerian dinar; Libyan dinar; Mauritanian ouguiya; Moroccan dirham; Tunisian dinar
- Website maghrebarabe.org

The Arab Maghreb Union (Arabic: إتحاد المغرب العربي Ittiḥād al-Maghrib al-‘Arabī; AMU/UMA) is a political union and economic union trade agreement aiming for economic and future political unity among Arab countries that are located primarily in the Maghreb in North Africa. Its members are the nations of Algeria, Libya, Mauritania, Morocco and Tunisia. The Union has been unable to achieve tangible progress on its goals due to deep economic and political disagreements between Morocco and Algeria regarding, among others, the issue of Western Sahara. No high-level meetings have taken place since 3 July 2008, and commentators regard the Union as largely dormant.

== Creation ==
The idea for an economic union of the Maghreb began with the independence of Tunisia and Morocco in 1956. It was not until thirty years later, though, that five Maghreb states - Algeria, Libya, Mauritania, Morocco, and Tunisia - met for the first Maghreb summit in 1988. The Union was established on 17 February 1989 when the treaty was signed by the member states in Marrakech. According to the Constitutive Act, its aim is to guarantee cooperation "with similar regional institutions... [to] take part in the enrichment of the international dialogue... [to] reinforce the independence of the member states and... [to] safeguard... their assets." Strategic relevance of the region is based on the fact that, collectively, it boasts large phosphate, oil, and gas reserves, and it is a transit centre to southern Europe. The success of the Union would, therefore, be economically important.

== Organization ==
There is a rotating chairmanship within the AMU which is held in turn by each nation. The current Secretary-General is the Tunisian Taïeb Baccouche.

== Members ==
During the 16th session of the AMU Foreign Ministers, held on 12 November 1994 in Algiers, Egypt applied to join the AMU grouping.

- Algeria
- Libya
- Mauritania
- Morocco
- Tunisia

== Economy ==
The economy of the AMU combines the economies of four out of five member states. All countries are predominantly Arab and Muslim states. The four out of five AMU countries have a combined GDP (at purchasing power parity; PPP) of US$1.5276 trillion. The richest country on the basis of GDP per capita at PPP is Algeria. On the basis of per capita GDP (nominal), Libya is the richest country, with incomes exceeding US$65.803 per capita.

Economies of AMU members
Country	GDP (nominal)	GDP (PPP)	GDP (nominal) per capita	GDP (PPP) per capita	HDI
Algeria	▲317.173	▲941.544	▲6,628	▲19,677	0.763
Libya	▲52.453	▲141.260	▲6,962	▲18,749	0.721
Mauritania	▲14.352	▲43.912	▲3,033	▲9,280	0.563
Morocco	▲194.333	▲469.394	▲5,107	▲12,336	0.710
Tunisia	▲60.745	▲196.564	▲4,893	▲15,833	0.746
Arab Maghreb Union	639.056	1,792.674	5,857	16,429	0.730

== Operations ==
There have been problems of traditional rivalries within the AMU. For example, in 1994, Algeria decided to transfer the presidency of the AMU to Libya. This followed the diplomatic tensions between Algeria and other members, especially Morocco and Libya, whose leaders continuously refused to attend AMU meetings held in Algiers. Algerian officials justified the decision, arguing that they were simply complying with the AMU Constitutive Act, which stipulates that the presidency should in fact rotate on an annual basis. Algeria agreed to take over the presidency from Tunisia in 1994, but could not transfer it due to the absence of all required conditions to relinquish the presidency as stipulated by the Constitutive Act.

Following the announcement of the decision to transfer the presidency of the Union, the Libyan leader, Muammar Gaddafi, stated that it was time to put the Union "in the freezer". This raised questions about Libya's position towards the Union. The concern was that Libya would have a negative influence on the manner in which it would preside over the organization.

Moreover, traditional rivalries between Morocco and Algeria, and the unsolved question of Western Sahara's sovereignty, have blocked union meetings since the early 1990s despite several attempts to re-launch the political process. Western Sahara, a former Spanish colony that was invaded by Morocco and Mauritania, has declared independence as the Sahrawi Arab Democratic Republic. The latest top-level conference, in mid-2005, was derailed by Morocco's refusal to meet, due to Algeria's vocal support for Sahrawi independence. Algeria has continuously supported the Polisario Front liberation movement.

Several attempts have been made, notably by the United Nations, to resolve the Western Sahara issue. In mid-2003, the UN Secretary General's Personal Envoy, James Baker, proposed a settlement plan, also referred to as the Baker Plan II. The UN's proposal was rejected by Morocco and accepted by the Sahrawi Arab Democratic Republic. As far as bilateral attempts are concerned, very little has been achieved, as Morocco continues to refuse any concessions that would allow the independence of Western Sahara, while Algeria maintains its support for the self-determination of the Sahrawis.

In addition, the quarrel between Gaddafi's Libya and Mauritania has not made the task of reinvigorating the organization any easier. Mauritania has accused the Libyan secret service of being involved in a 2003 attempted coup against President Maaouya Ould Sid'Ahmed Taya. Libya has denied all the accusation.

By 2023, the single currency project in the area remained technically feasible but politically infeasible.

In April 2024, Algeria, Tunisia, and Libya discussed the establishment of a new North African entity, supposed to replace the Arab Maghreb Union, which they consider "inoperative", without Morocco, and Mauritania. It was decided that joint working groups will be created to coordinate efforts on the security of common borders in the face of irregular migration and the establishment of major joint investment projects on cereal production as well as water desalination of sea water in the face of climate change, and the free movement of goods and people between the three countries.

In November 2024, Algerian president Abdelmadjid Tebboune invited Kais Saied, President of Tunisia, Mohamed Ould Ghazouani, President of Mauritania, Mohamed al-Menfi, President of the Libyan Presidential Council, and Ibrahim Ghali, President of the Sahrawi Republic, to attend the celebration of the 70th anniversary of the Declaration of 1 November 1954. This meeting is seen as the beginning of a new union with the notable absence of Morocco and Mauritania.

A third tripartite summit between Tunisia, Libya, and Algeria was held in Tripoli in January 2025.

== See also ==
- Maghrebis
- African Economic Community (AEC)
- Arab League
- Common Market for Eastern and Southern Africa (COMESA)
- Economic Community of West African States (ECOWAS)
- Euro-Mediterranean free trade area (EU-MEFTA)
- Greater Arab Free Trade Area (GAFTA)
- List of trade blocs
- US - Middle East Free Trade Area (US-MEFTA)
- African Union (AU)
- Union for the Mediterranean (UfM)
