= Africa Prosperity Network =

Ghana-based non-profit organisation

- Abbreviation: APN
- Formation: May 22, 2022
- Headquarters: Labone, Accra, Ghana
- Coordinates: .574715427598659°N 0.17028214232905473°W
- Website: https://africaprosperitynetwork.com/

The Africa Prosperity Network (APN) is a non-profit organisation, founded with the objective of advancing the vision of ‘The Africa We Want’ as outlined in the African Union’s Agenda 2063.

The network's mission is to bring prosperity to Africa by creating platforms for holding critical dialogues that will reshape the thinking of African leaders and encourage them to take bold steps in the areas of trade, the structure of national economies, political conduct, and culture.

== Organisation ==
=== Advisory Council ===
Advisory Council
Name
Nkosazana Clarice Dlamini-Zuma
Amina Mohamed
Eugene Owusu
Amany Asfour
Patricia Poku Diaby
Cesar Augusto Mba Abogo
Christal Jackson
Joshua Siaw

== Activities & Advocacy ==
=== Make Africa Borderless Now! ===
The ‘Make Africa Borderless Now’ Movement, was launched in Accra, Ghana at the Africa Prosperity Dialogues 2026. It is an initiative calling for faster progress on mobility, trade integration and the practical implementation of AfCFTA. The campaign aims to gather 10 million signatures to be presented to African Heads of State at the 40th African Union Summit in Addis Ababa in February 2027.

=== Malabo Leadership Breakfast Meeting ===
The Malabo Leadership Breakfast Meeting, convened political and business leaders on the sidelines of the African Union's 7th Mid-Year Coordination Meeting and focused on positioning, Equatorial Guinea as an investment destination and tackled pan-African challenges, including high transport costs, fragmented markets, and underperforming logistics systems, under the theme “Financing and Facilitating the Movement of People, Goods and Services Across Africa”.

=== Continental Mobile Money Interoperability Symposium ===
The Continental Mobile Money Interoperability Symposium or Interoperability Symposium emphasises financial inclusion as a catalyst for development and economic progress across Africa. The symposium brings together industry players to discuss the essential components and strategies for creating an integrated payment system to boost intra-African trade.

Overview of Past Symposia
Year	Dates	Theme
2024	July 5	Scaling up interoperability: Using Mobile Money to Buy and Sell across Africa

=== Global Africa Forum ===
The Global African Forum serves as a platform for connecting the African continent with its diaspora to foster collaboration and take advantage of economic opportunities aligned with the African Union's Agenda 2063.

=== Africa Prosperity Dialogues (APD) ===
The Africa Prosperity Dialogues (previously called the Kwahu Summit), a flagship event organised in partnership with the African Continental Free Trade Area Secretariat and the Government of the Republic of Ghana, serves as a dedicated annual platform that brings together Africa and Global Africa’s business executives and organisations, and political leaders to think together, plan together, to work together with the needed urgency to drive the goal of building the world’s largest single market in Africa.

Overview of Past Dialogues
Year	Dates	Theme
2023	January 26–28	AfCFTA: From Ambition to Action, Delivering Prosperity Through Continental Trade
2024	January 25–27	Delivering Prosperity in Africa: Produce. Add Value. Trade.
2025	January 30–1 February	Delivering Africa’s Single Market through Infrastructure: Invest. Connect. Integrate.
2026	February 4–6	Empowering SMEs, Women & Youth in Africa’s Single Market: Innovate. Collaborate. Trade.

=== Africa Prosperity Champions Awards (APCA) ===
The Africa Prosperity Champions Awards (APCA) celebrates the accomplishments of distinguished Africans across various sectors.

Past Winners
Personality	Category
2025
Herman Chinery-Hesse	Lifetime Achievement Award in Digital Technology
Dr. Sidi Ould Tah	Financial Leadership Award
Bridgette Motsepe-Radebe	Women Empowerment Award
Wode Maya	Excellence in Tourism Promotion for Africa and Global Africa Award
Dr. Rakesh Wahi	Excellence in Pan-African Media Award
Dr. Nkosazana Dlamini-Zuma	Champion of the Africa We Want Award
Mesfin Tasew	Leadership in Connecting Africa Award
Nana Addo Dankwa Akufo-Addo	Transformational Leadership in Education Award
2024
Baroness Patricia Scotland of Asthal	Global African Champion Award
Irfaan Ali	Global African Leadership Award
Alassane Ouattara	Nation Builder Award
Oluwatosin Oluwole Ajibade (Mr Eazi )	Young Entrepreneur Award
Prof. Benedict Okechukwu Oramah	Financial Leadership Award
Mohamed M. Abou El Enein	Industrialist of the Year Award
