= Benedict Okey Oramah =

Nigerian economist (born 1961)

Benedict Okechukwu "Okey" Oramah GCON

3rd President and Chairman of the African Export–Import Bank (Afreximbank)
- In office 13 July 2015 – 25 October 2025
- Preceded by: Jean-Louis Ekra
- Succeeded by: George Elombi

Personal details
- Born: 24 July 1961 (age 65) Ahoada, Nigeria
- Citizenship: Nigeria (1961–present)
- Spouse: Chinelo Oramah
- Children: 3
- Education: University of Ibadan (BSc); University of Ife (MA, PhD)

Benedict Okechukwu “Okey” Oramah GCON (born 24 July 1961) is a Nigerian economist who served as president and chairman of the Board of Directors of the African Export-Import Bank (Afreximbank). He was elected President of the African Export-Import Bank (Afreximbank) in 2015 and re-elected for a second term in 2020. He was succeeded by Cameroonian national, George Elombi appointed on June 28, 2025, at the Afreximbank Annual Meetings in Abuja, Nigeria.

== Biography ==
=== Early life and education ===
Benedict Okechukwu Oramah was born on 24 July 1961 to Chief Lazarus A. and Francisca U. Oramah in Ahoada, in present-day Rivers State of Nigeria. He is from Nnokwa town in Idemili South Local Government, Anambra State. He is the youngest of four children.

Oramah attended the Merchants of Light School in Oba before obtaining a bachelor's degree in Agricultural Economics from the University of Ibadan in 1983. He subsequently obtained his master's degree and Doctor of Philosophy from the University of Ife (now Obafemi Awolowo University) in the same field. Oramah holds an Advanced Management Certificate from Columbia Business School, New York.

In 2018, he was appointed a professor of International Trade and Finance by Adeleke University, Nigeria.

=== Career ===
Oramah began his professional career at the Nigerian Export-Import Bank (NEXIM) in 1992 as an Assistant Manager.

In March 1994, he joined African Export-Import Bank as one of the original employees. He has served in various roles in Afreximbank including serving as Chief Analyst, assistant director in 1998, deputy director in 2001, and substantive Director of the Planning and Business Development Department in 2004. He was promoted to Senior Director in 2007 and appointed Executive Vice President, Business Development and Corporate Banking in 2008.

On 13 June 2015, Oramah was appointed President of Afreximbank at the bank's 22nd Annual Meeting of Shareholders in Lusaka, Zambia. He formally assumed office on 21 September 2015, succeeding Jean-Louis Ekra. His leadership was reaffirmed with his reappointment for a second five-year term in 2020.

Under his leadership, Afreximbank has evolved into a group entity comprising the Bank, its impact fund subsidiary, the Fund for Export Development in Africa (FEDA), and its insurance management arm, AfrexInsure. The group also includes several strategic subsidiaries and initiatives, such as MANSA, a repository platform for customer due diligence on African entities; the Pan-African Payment and Settlement System (PAPSS); Creative African Nexus (CANEX); the African Medical Centre of Excellence (AMCE); the Intra-African Trade Fair (IATF); and the Africa Quality Assurance Centre (AQAC). During his tenure, the Bank's balance sheet assets have grown from $5 billion in 2015 to $37 billion in 2023.

=== Personal life ===
Oramah is married to Mrs. Chinelo Oramah. They have three daughters.

== Board memberships ==
Oramah holds various leadership and board roles in several organizations and initiatives, including.

- Chairman of the Board of Directors of the Fund for Export Development in Africa (FEDA)
- Chairman of the management board of Directors of the Pan-African Payment and Settlement System (PAPSS)
- Chairman of the executive committee of the Arab-Africa Trade Bridges (AATB),
- Chairman of the Board of Trustees of the African Union COVID-19 Response Fund,
- Board member of the Sustainable Development Goals Centre for Africa (SDGCA),
- Member, Consultative Board on the World Cocoa Economy of the International Cocoa Organization (ICCO).
- Member of the Intra-African Trade Fair (IATF) Advisory Council,
- Member of the Practitioners Advisory Board of the Institute for Trade and Innovation (IfTI) at Offenburg University, Germany
- Board member of the Coalition for Dialogue on Africa (CoDA)
- Member of the Emerging Markets Advisory Council of the Institute of International Finance (IIF-EMAC).
- Fellow of the Institute of Credit Administration (ICA) and the Chartered Institute of Bankers of Nigeria (CIBN).

== Awards and honours ==
Oramah has received recognitions for his contributions to business and African trade, including.

- 2024 Mohammed S. Barkindo Lifetime Achievement Award by the African Energy Week Awards
- 2024 Financial Leadership Award by the Africa Prosperity Network
- 2023, Forbes Africa magazine Person of The Year award
- 2023 "Business Leader of the Year" at CNBC Africa's 11th All Africa Business Leaders Awards
- 2017 and 2022 "African Banker of the Year" by the African Bankers’ Magazine.
- 2022 Margaret Herz Demant Award for African Art by the Detroit Institute of Arts.
- 2019 to 2022 - Oramah has been listed as one of the 100 most influential Africans by New African Magazine
- Top 100 Influential Africans by Jeune Afrique magazine for multiple years since 2017.
- He also holds honorary doctorates from the Obafemi Awolowo University and Nnamdi Azikiwe University.

=== National honours ===
- Nigeria:
  - Grand Commander of the Order of the Niger (GCON) - 2025

=== Foreign honours ===
- Cameroon:
  - Knight of the National Order of Merit - 2019

== Published works ==
- A Path to Making Africa Great Again, New York University and Afreximbank, 2018
- Foundations of Structured Trade Finance, Wilmington, Ark Group Ltd., London, 2015
- Potentials for Diversifying Nigeria’s Non-Oil Exports to Non-Traditional Markets, Research Report 68, African Economic Research Consortium (AERC), Nairobi, November 1997
