= ACTIF =

The ACTIF or alternately African–Caribbean (AfriCaribbean) Trade and Investment Forum (ACTIF) are a series of conferences which have taken place between the member states of the African continent and the Caribbean Community (CARICOM). First begun in 2022 it was created as an initiative of the involved member states plus many organisations including: the African Export–Import Bank, the African Union Commission, the African Continental Free Trade Area Secretariat, the Africa Business Council, the CARICOM Secretariat, and the Caribbean Export Development Agency, among others. Both groups have formed the high-level of multilateral dialogue series to further investment and cooperation between both regions in many levels of arrangement. The meeting series is part of the initiative to further integrate the Caribbean with the African Union-bloc as its 6th region known as the Diaspora. And the ultimate expansion of a possible full scope free trade arrangement between both.

== Summits list ==
African–Caribbean Trade and Investment Forum (ACTIF)
Summit	Year	Date	Name	Host country	Host city	ref
1st	ACTIF2022	September 2022	One People, One Destiny: Uniting and Reimagining Our Future	Barbados	Bridgetown	
2nd	ACTIF2023	October 2023	Creating a Shared Prosperous Future	Guyana	Georgetown	
3rd	ACTIF2024	June 2024	Owning Our Destiny: Economic Prosperity on the Platform of Global Africa	Bahamas	Nassau	
4th	ACTIF2025	July 2025	Resilience and Transformation: Enhancing Africa-Caribbean Economic Cooperation in an Era of Global Uncertainty	Grenada	St. George's	

== See also ==
- Agenda 2063
- Africa–CARICOM Summit
- Intra-African Trade Fair (IATF)
- CARICOM Single Market and Economy
- Organisation of Eastern Caribbean States
