= Kaushik Burman =

Indian engineer and business executive

Dr Kaushik Burman
- Born: 7 December 1978 (age 47); Kolkata, India
- Education: University College of Engineering, Osmania University; University of Delhi; INSEAD; International American University
- Occupation: Business executive
- Employers: Shell plc (2012-2019); Gogoro (2019-2023); Spiro (2023- present)
- Known for: E-mobility and clean-energy transport
- Title: CEO at Spiro
- Predecessor: Shegun Adjadi Bakari
- Spouse: Nithya Ravishankar

Kaushik Burman is a business executive, who has been the CEO of Spiro, Africa’s e-mobility company since August 2023. Previously he has held leadership positions at Fortune 500 companies and early-stage clean energy startup to commercial scale.

== Early life and education ==
Burman was born in Kolkata, West Bengal, India. His father, Manas Kumar Burman, was a chemical engineer and his mother, Shyamali Burman, was a classical music teacher. He completed his high school from Hyderabad Public School, Begumpet, which has a notable alumni network (Satya Nadella, Ajay Banga and Shantanu Narayan). Burman attended the National Defence Academy (NDA) in Khadakwasla, Pune. He secured an All India Rank of 7 (AIR 7) and was selected for the Indian Air Force. At the academy, he was a cadet of Foxtrot Squadron.

Burman earned a degree in Mechanical Engineering from the University College of Engineering, Osmania University in Hyderabad and graduated in 2001. He has an MBA from FMS Delhi and also an MBA from INSEAD in 2011. He completed the Chief AI Officer program from Cornell University, USA. He also completed an advanced program in technology and policy at the Harvard Kennedy School in 2023. In 2026, Burman received his honorary doctorate from International American University.

== Career ==
Burman began his career at Tata Consultancy Services as a design engineer before moving to Nestlé India, Citibank, where he worked in sales, distribution channels and key account management, and HSBC in sales and business development roles.

In 2012, Burman joined Shell plc, working across Europe and Asia in fleet management, transport solutions, and marketing. Burman was a founding member of Shell’s Liquefied Natural Gas for transport team based in The Hague, Netherlands. He was involved in establishing supply chains, designing refueling infrastructure, and collaborating with industry partners. He also worked on e-mobility and B2B initiatives within Shell. Between 2017 and 2019, he was general manager for Shell Fleet Solutions in Singapore and Indonesia.

In 2019, Burman joined Gogoro, a Taiwanese battery-swap and electric-scooter company. At Gogoro, he worked on the company’s expansion across Indonesia, Singapore, Philippines, and India. He worked on agreements involving the Government of Maharashtra, investment in Zypp Electric, joint ventures with Hero Motocorp and Belrise Industries. He led pilot projects in Delhi and the National Capital Region developing battery-swap infrastructure.

=== Spiro ===
In 2023, Burman was appointed CEO of Spiro, a company operating electric motorcycles and battery-swap infrastructure in Africa, including Rwanda, Benin, Togo, Nigeria, Uganda, Cameroon, Mali, DRC, Ghana and Kenya. In May 2024, Spiro was included in TIME’s 100 Most Influential Companies list.

By 2025, Spiro had expanded its electric motorcycle and battery-swapping operations across six African markets, with pilot deployments launched in Tanzania and Cameroon. Spiro has deployed 125,000 bikes across 10 countries. Spiro was named among the five finalists for the 2025 Milken-Motsepe Prize in AI and Manufacturing. In 2026, Burman was featured in Forbes Africa's Kenya Special Edition.

==== Fundraising ====
During Burman's tenure, Spiro raised a series of funding to expand across Africa. In 2023, the company secured up to US$63 million from Société Générale and GuarantCo. In May 2024, Spiro received US$50 million from Afreximbank. In October 2025, Spiro announced a US$100 million investment round led by the Fund for Export Development in Africa. In 2026, Spiro secured a further US$215 million in equity investment from institutional investors, including Impact Fund Denmark, followed by an additional US$55 million from NewTrails Capital, bringing the combined round to US$270 million.

== Impact ==
At Gogoro, Burman oversaw the development of India’s first battery-swapping pilot projects and related infrastructure. Since 2023, as CEO of Spiro, he has led the company in scaling electric motorcycles and establishing battery-swapping networks across 7 African countries.
