= Africa–CARICOM Summit =

African–Caribbean diplomatic conference

The Africa–CARICOM Summit is a quadrennial bi-continental diplomatic conference between the leading politicians of countries in Africa and the member states of the Caribbean Community (CARICOM). It was first held in 2021 virtually. Particular emphasis has been placed in past summits on the shared histories of colonialism and the Atlantic slave trade, as well as formal support for reparations for slavery and economic integration proposals and initiatives.

== Summits ==
=== 2021 summit ===
The first was virtually held online on 7 September 2021 due to the SARS-CoV-2 pandemic of 2019. The event was opened by Uhuru Kenyatta and was held under the theme "Unity Across Continents and Oceans: Opportunities for Deepening Integration".

=== 2025 summit ===
The second summit was held on 7 September 2025 at the headquarters of the African Union Commission in Addis Ababa, Ethiopia. It was opened by João Lourenço and was held under the theme "Transcontinental Partnership in Pursuit of Reparatory Justice for Africans and People of African Descent through Reparations". In addition to the traditional Caribbean Community-bloc the government and people of Cuba also held a concurrent Africa-CARICOM Day celebration in Havana, Cuba. Also discussed on the sidelines was the MOU for strategic partnership in various areas of cooperation including: trade, health, education, technology & diplomacy towards a more effective multilateralism.

== See also ==
- ACTIF
- Group of African, Caribbean and Pacific countries
- African Union Commission
- African Continental Free Trade Area (AfCFTA)
- African Export–Import Bank
- CARICOM Single Market and Economy (CSME)
- Foreign relations of the African Union
- Africa–South America Summit
