= Agencies of the African Union =

Specialized institutions of the African Union

The agencies of the African Union (AU) are specialized institutions which carry out their respective functions but still relates to the mandate of the AU. The specialties include sectors such as education, economics, human rights, and continental security. The agencies differ from the AU's organs, such as The Pan-African Parliament and the Court of Justice of the African Union, which are established by the African Union Assembly.

The agencies may not be necessarily created by the AU but is linked or affiliated to the establishment by way of the Assembly. They are also independent bodies which are outside the managerial, budgetary rules and regulations of the AU.

== List ==
Name	Date	Purpose	Abbreviation	Category	Ref.
Pan African University	14 December 2011	Promoting higeher education & research in Africa	PAU	Educational organisation	
Pan-African Institute for Education for Development (Formerly the African Bureau of Educational Sciences)	1973	Promote educational development high in quality, responsiveness and inclusivity	IPED-AU	Educational organisation	
African Continental Free Trade Area Secretariat	May 30, 2019	Raising living conditions for African people	AfCFTA	Economic institution	
Committee of Intelligence and Security Services of Africa	August 2004	Addressing security concerns in Africa	CISSA	Intelligence organisation	
African Union-Inter-African Phyto-Sanitary Council	April 1969	Improving livelihood, food security and rural economies	AU-IAPSC	Food security organisation	
African Civil Aviation Commission	1978	Providing aviation frameworks for civil aviation authorities	AFCAC	Aviation institution	
African Rehabilitation Institute	17 July 1985	Promoting development of prevention and rehabilitation services	ARI	Rehabilitative institution	
African Energy Commission	11 July 2001	Enhancing the development of Africa's energy resources	AFREC	Economic organisation	
African Commission on Nuclear Energy	15 July 2009	Supporting the development of nuclear energy in Africa	AFCONE	Nuclear treaty	
African Union Institute for Statistics	January 2013	Promoting statistical information of high quality	STATAFRIC	Statistical institution	
Pan-African Youth Union Youth Council (Formerly the Pan African Youth Movement)	26 April 1962	Improving fate of young Africans	UPJ/PYU	Youth organisation	
African Airlines Association	1968	Establishing effective co-operation between African Airlines	AFRAA	Aviation institution	
African Telecommunications Union	7 December 1977	Accelerating the development of telecommunications in Africa	ATU	Telecommunications organisation	
African Union Scientific, Technical and Research Commission	1964	Popularise scientific and technological research culture in Africa.	AU-STRC	Research institution	
Pan African Postal Union	18 January 1980	Promote the development of postal services in Africa.	PAPU	Postal institution	
African Union Observatory for Science, Technology, and Innovation	February 2009	Promoting the use of science, technology and innovation (STI) in Africa	AOSTI	Research institution	
African Risk Capacity	23 November 2012	Reduce the risk of loss and damage affecting Africa’s populations	ARC	Financial organization	
Pan African Intellectual Property Organisation	30 January 2013	Promote effective use of the intellectual property system in the AU	PAIPO	IP institution	
African Union/International Centre for Girls’ and Women’s Education in Africa	July 2004	Dealing with women and girls’ education in Africa	AU/CIEFFA	Educational organisation	
Trust Fund for Africa Women (formerly Fund for African Women)	January 2010	Mobilizing resources for programmes and projects for African Women	TFAW	Financial institution	
African Minerals Development Centre	July 2018	Promote the role of mineral resources in AU	AMDC	Mining institution	
Semi-Arid Food Grain Research and Development	1977	Contribute to sustainable food security	AU–SAFGRAD	Food security organisation	
African Union–Inter-African Bureau for Animal Resources (Formerly the Interafrican Bureau for Epizootic Diseases)	1983	Advancing the development and sustainable management of animal resources in Africa	AU–IBAR	Livestock institution	
Pan African Veterinary Vaccine Centre	12 March 2004	Promote the use of good quality vaccine for the control and eradication of animal diseases in Africa.	PANVAC	Health organization	
Pan African Tsetse and Trypanosomiasis Eradication Campaign	July 2000	Eradicate tsetse flies and the trypanosomiasis diseases across Africa	PATTEC	Health organization	
African Centre for the Study and Research on Terrorism	13 October 2004	Conduct research and study on terrorism and counterterrorism in Africa	ACSRT	Counterintelligence organisation	
African Union Mechanism for Police Cooperation	30 January 2017	Preventing and combating organized crime, terrorism, cybercrime, and other threats to continental security.	AFRIPOL	Counterintelligence organisation	
African Union Centre for Post-Conflict Reconstruction and Development	21 December 2021	Monitoring and evaluating post-conflict reconstruction and development (PCRD) programmes and projects in countries emerging from conflicts.	AUC-PCRD	Security organisation	
Africa Centres for Disease Control and Prevention	January 2016	Improve surveillance of emergency response and prevention of infectious diseases	Africa CDC	Health organization	
AIDS Watch Africa	2001	Addressing and mobilizing resources to end AIDS in Africa, tuberculosis (TB) and malaria by 2030.	AWA	Health organization	
African Medicines Agency	February 2019	Facilitate harmonisation of mecial regulation throughout Africa	AMA	Health organization	
Centre for Linguistic and Historical Studies by Oral Tradition (Formerly Centre for Research and Documentation for Oral Tradition)	1974	Recover Africa's autonomy by affirming a cultural identity by promoting integration and development of the continent.	CELHTO	Linguistic institution	
African Academy of Languages (Formerly Mission for the African Academy of Languages)	19 December 2000	Promoting African Languages for a Peaceful, Prosperous & Integrated Africa	ACALAN	Linguistic institution	
African Institute for Remittances	2015	Making remittance transfers to and within Africa cheaper, safer, faster, and easier	AIR	Financial institution	
African Union Sport Council	31 January 2016	Promotion and development of sports in Africa.	AUSC	Sports organisation	
African Audiovisual and Cinema Commission	February 2019	Promotion of the rapid development of the African audiovisual and cinema industry	AACC	Filmographic organisation	
African Centre for the Study and Research on Migration	19 March 2021	Strengthen overall migration governance in Africa	CARIM	Social institution	
African Migration Observatory	2018	Improve the overall migration governance in Africa.	AMO	Social institution	
African Union Development Agency	July 2018	Facilitate and coordinate the implementation of regional and continental priority development programmes and projects	AUDA-NEPAD	Economic organisation	
African Capacity Building Foundation	February 9, 1991	Develop the human capital and institutions to enable Africa’s inclusive and sustainable development.	ACBF	Economic organisation	
Pan African Women’s Organization (Formerly the African Women's Union)	31 July 1962	Strive for the effective and responsible participation of African women in the socio-economic, political and cultural development of Africa	PAWO	Rights organisation	

== Notes ==
1.When each agency was founded.

== See also ==
- Agenda 2063
- Regional economic communities
