= Gagan Gupta =

Indian Businessman (born May 10, 1975)

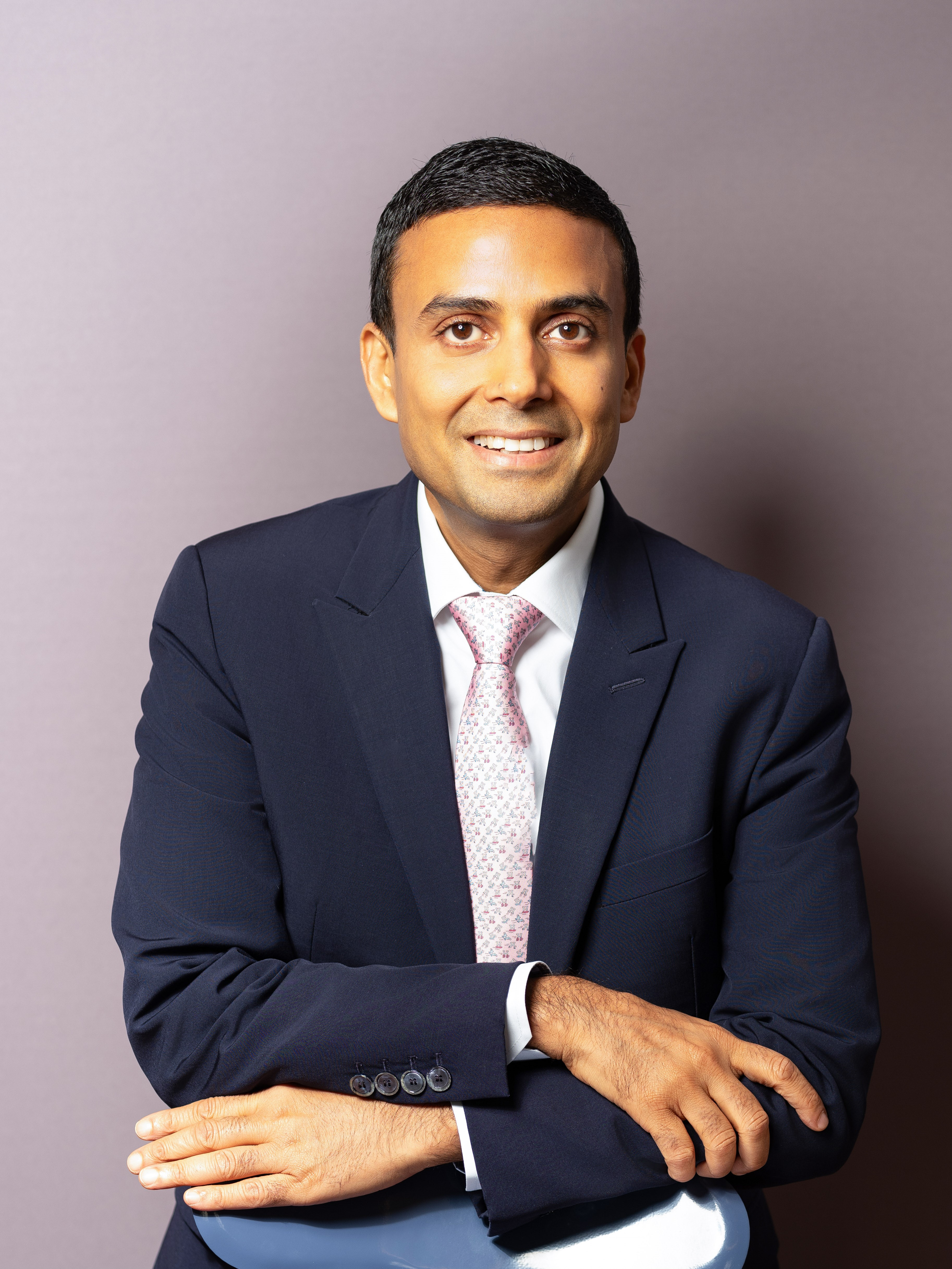
- Born: May 10, 1975 (age 51); Rajasthan, India
- Education: All India Rank (Institute of Chartered Accountants of India)
- Known for: Co-creator and CEO of Arise P&L, Arise IIP, Arise IS
- Title: CEO

Gagan Gupta (born May 10, 1975) is an Indian businessman and investor specializing in industrial development, infrastructure, mining, energy, logistics and electric mobility in Africa. He is the founder and CEO of Arise, a leading pan-African industrial infrastructure construction and logistics group operating in fourteen countries.

Beyond his role at Arise, he is founder and president of Equitane, a private-equity investment firm managing $4 billion in assets, as well as Spiro, Africa's leading startup in electric mobility, and Africa Minerals and Metals Processing Platform (A2MP), a large-scale pan-African initiative focused on the extraction and local processing of minerals and metals, with a dozen active projects in Africa.

== Early life and education ==
Gagan Gupta was born on May 10, 1975, in Rajasthan, India. He holds a Bachelor of Commerce from Delhi University and earned an All India Rank from the Institute of Chartered Accountants of India (ICAI).

== Career ==
=== Early career ===
Gagan Gupta began his career as a chartered accountant and management controller in the finance departments of Reebok and Reckitt Benckiser in India.

In 2008, he joined Olam International Limited, where he was appointed head of the company's Gabonese operations.

In 2010, he was successively appointed Country Manager, Group Operations Director in Central Africa, and Business Development Director at Olam International.

The same year, he initiated public-private partnerships (PPPs) with the Gabonese government, implementing major projects to accelerate industrialization and infrastructure development. These PPPs are divided into three main sectors:

- Agriculture: The creation of Africa's largest virgin palm oil plantation (60,000 ha) and one of the world's largest rubber plantations (10,000 ha).
- Industrial development: The establishment of the Nkok Special Economic Zone (GSEZ) in Gabon, Africa's first carbon-neutral industrial hub.
- Logistics infrastructure: The creation of the Owendo mineral port, the new Owendo international port and the redevelopment of Libreville international airport.

=== Arise's founding and expansion in Africa ===
In 2018, Gagan Gupta founded Arise, a company specializing in the development of integrated industrial platforms, ports and large-scale infrastructure across Africa.

Arise is structured into three divisions :

- Arise Integrated Industrial Platforms (IIP) is developing integrated parks in several African countries. Among its projects underway in 2025 is a $150 million industrial zone in Malawi. The project is expected to create 132,000 direct jobs and 26,000 indirect jobs.
- Arise Ports & Logistics (P&L) specializes in port logistics operations. Its shareholders include A.P. Moller Capital (42.28%), Olam International and Africa Finance Corporation.
- Arise Infrastructure Services (IS) specializes in all other infrastructure.

In February 2021, Olam International entered into definitive agreements with Africa Transformation and Industrialization Fund, an Abu Dhabi-based investment fund established by Arise employees. The two companies closed the sale of Olam's remaining shares in Arise Integrated Industrial Platforms (Arise IIP) and Arise Infrastructure Services (Arise IS).

In October 2024, Arise IIP raises $443 million to finance its expansion, including $300 million from the Fund for Export Development in Africa (FEDA), the development branch of Afreximbank and $143 million from Africa Finance Corporation (AFC). With this round of financing, Arise IIP's total capital exceeds one billion dollars.

In September 2025, the company announced a new $700 million capital raise. This transaction marked the entry of Saudi investor Vision Invest into the platform’s capital, alongside AFC, Equitane and FEDA.

In 2025, Arise is established in Ivory Coast, Sierra Leone, Togo Bénin, Nigéria, Gabon, Tchad, Congo, Democratic Republic of the Congo, Senegal, Rwanda, Cameroon, Kenya, Tanzania and Malawi.

The company has developed a model enabling African countries to make their raw materials production more profitable through targeted investments in local processing. By reducing the export of raw materials from Africa to Asia and other regions in favor of local processing, Arise intends to reduce carbon emissions, support the creation of jobs and value locally and shorten global supply chains.

=== Diversification ===
==== Creation of Equitane ====
In 2024, Gagan Gupta renamed the Africa Transformation and Industrialization Fund (ATIF) into Equitane, a multi-sector investment company dedicated to sustainable industrialization and economic transformation in Africa. Unlike conventional investment funds, Equitane operates as a permanent capital investment structure, focusing on long-term development over short-term returns. Equitane operates in 14 countries.

Equitane comprises five main activities:

- Infrastructure: Equitane owns 24.08% of Arise IIP, supporting the expansion of industrial and logistics hubs across Africa.
- Green mobility: The company owns Spiro, an African electric mobility company.
- Manufacturing: Equitane holds investments in agro-processing (cotton, sugar), pharmaceuticals and ceramics.
- Mining: Equitane holds a minority stake in the Belinga iron ore project in Gabon, to promote resource transformation and industrial integration. In March 2025, Gagan Gupta acquired a 9.7% stake in Zanaga Iron Ore Company, operator of the Zanaga iron ore project in the Republic of Congo. This $21.5 million transaction enabled the withdrawal of Glencore, the former majority shareholder (43.17%), which had been inactive on the project. The Zanaga site, located in the Lékoumou region, contains an estimated reserve of 2.1 billion tonnes of iron ore, with a projected capacity of 30 million tonnes per year. The operation also reopened the prospect of relaunching economic studies and forming a consortium to build key infrastructure, including a 300km railway line linking the deposit to the port of Pointe-Noire.
- Finance: A $50 million investment fund to promote African entrepreneurship.

==== Entrepreneurship in sustainable development ====
With Equitane, Gagan Gupta created the electric vehicle startup Spiro, specializing in electric motorcycles. In October 2025, Spiro announced what it described as the largest investment ever made in electric mobility in Africa, with a record $100 million fundraising round from Afreximbank and a private investor. By 2025, Spiro is operating in six African countries: Togo, Benin, Rwanda, Kenya, Uganda and Nigeria.

Equitane is also behind Solen, a company focused on solar energy and electricity storage in Gabon, Benin, Togo and Chad. Solen operates 50 MW of active projects and is developing a further 300 MW. Solen is an independent power producer. It operates Ayémé Solar Power Station.

Gagan Gupta also founded the African Trade and Distribution Company (ATDC), a vehicle designed to strengthen intra-African trade.

In 2021, Arise acquired 35% of Aera Group, which operates in the carbon credits market.

In 2023, Arise IIP acquired a 17.6% stake in Crystalchain, a French company specializing in supply chain transparency via blockchain.

== Private life ==
Gagan Gupta is married with two children. A long-distance runner, he initiated the organization of the Gabon Marathon, by making Olam the first official sponsor of this event. In 2023, the race gathered 14,000 runners.

== Awards ==
Gagan Gupta was named vice president of the Giants Club in recognition of his efforts to foster sustainable and environmentally friendly industrialization, as well as the establishment of Africa's first carbon-neutral special economic zone (GSEZ). The Giants Club supports African governments in the protection of their natural resources, and promotes economic development.
