= Africa Energy Bank =

Multilaterial investment bank

The Africa Energy Bank is a multilateral bank created by the African Export-Import Bank (Afreximbank) and the African Petroleum Producers' Organization (APPO) designed to finance energy security and infrastructure in alignment with UN Sustainable Development Goals (SDGs) and the African Union's Agenda 2063. The bank will start with $10 billion of financing primarily for oil and gas. The bank plans to expand financing into a secondary phase of funding in 2027 to build a gas hub in alignment with the Congo Brazzaville Declaration, and further assets by 2030.

The bank is supposed to start operating on July 1, 2026, in Abuja, Nigeria, with funds originating from Nigeria, Angola and Ghana through the Africa Energy Investment Corporation, but in June 2026 that deadline was pushed back to September. The bank was initially announced in 2024, and thought to open in 2025. Nigeria won the rights to the headquarters in compeitition with four other countries: Ghana, Algeria, South Africa and Benin Republic. Three attempts were previously made to constitute the bank.

Experts interviewed by Gas Outlook described the bank as setting up opportunities for energy security and problems with securing capital and long-term investment from outside the continent. The long-term delay in implementation and financing for the bank, was described as part of a larger problem with large scale investments in fossil fuel infrastructure in Africa by commenter Félicien Houindo Lokossou.

According to Al Jazeera, climate civil society organizations questioned the strong emphasis of the banks funding on oil and gas projects which have a strong possibility of becoming stranded assets. Former Nigerian MP Samuel Onuigbo argued in an editorial for African Arguments that the strategy of the bank to double down on fossil fuel investment didn't take advantage of Africa's comparative advantage for renewables.
