= Yamoussoukro Decision =

Aviation treaty between African countries

Decision Relating to the Implementation of the Yamoussoukro Declaration Concerning the Liberalisation of Access to Air Transport Markets in Africa
- Members of the Single African Air Transport Market, an implementation of the Yamoussoukro Decision.
- Type: Air transport agreement
- Signed: 14 November 1999
- Location: Yamoussoukro, Ivory Coast
- Ratified: 12 July 2000
- Depositary: African Union; originally Organization of African Unity
- Languages: French and English

The Yamoussoukro Decision is a treaty adopted by most members of the African Union (AU) which establishes a framework for the liberalization of air transport services between African countries, as well as fair competition between airlines. The decision was signed by 44 African states in 1999, and became binding in 2002.

The treaty grants first, second, third, fourth and fifth freedom transit rights between all its signatories, granting airlines based in member states greater freedoms in each others' airspaces. It also seeks to eliminate restrictions on ownership of airlines as well as capacity and frequency limits on routes between signatory states. The practical implementation of its policies has faced a number of setbacks, however, and has not been completed by all AU members.

In 2018, the Single African Air Transport Market (SAATM) was launched, with the intent of fully implementing the Yamoussoukro Decision.

== Background ==
Aviation has long been understood to be uniquely important in the African context, due to the low quality of alternative modes of transport like roads, shipping and rail as well as the economic potential of the continent's air transportation market. Most inland and maritime infrastructure on the African continent prior to decolonization was built to transport resources to and from the coasts. Perceiving air traffic to be a means of circumventing the resulting lack of linkage between newly independent African states, the Organization of African Unity (OAU) declared in 1973 that air transport was "both far-reaching and essential for the development of Inter-African trade and for the improvement of the economic, social and cultural conditions of the African peoples." The capacity for growth and profits in the sector, due to Africa's abundance of resources and large populations, has also been widely noted by observers.

Upon gaining independence, many African nations developed their air services through a nationalized model, where state-owned air carriers funded more costly domestic transit with revenue from flights to and from former colonial metropoles. As most air transport agreements had been based on arrangements between European colonizers, African countries also began to regulate traffic between themselves using the then common system of bilateral air service agreements (bilaterals). It has been argued that these agreements have hampered the development of inter-African flight routes, as both the country of origin and destination must license an airline before it can fly between them.

Following air service liberalization in the United States and European Union in the late 20th Century, African policymakers also began to move towards deregulating the continent's air transport. Pressure to liberalize also began to emerge from domestic carriers, which wanted better access to new markets, as well as the United Nations Economic Commission for Africa (UNECA). Several initiatives were announced from the 1980s onwards, most notably the Yamoussoukro Declaration in 1988 and the Abuja Treaty in 1994. This culminated in the signing of the Yamoussoukro Decision in 1999, establishing principles through which deregulation and pro-competition policies could be implemented in the aviation sector.

== Treaty content and signing ==
In a conference in Yamoussoukro, Ivory Coast held over 13–14 November 1999, representatives of several nations met to negotiate the further deregulation of air services across Africa. The conference was organized in the wake of the 11th Conference of African Ministers Responsible for Transport and Communications, held in Cairo in November 1997, which recommended a meeting of ministers responsible for civil aviation in their respective countries to find ways of implementing the Yamoussoukro Declaration. A previous meeting in Mauritius in September 1994 also called for the Yamoussoukro Declaration to be implemented at a faster pace. The conference in Yamoussoukro concluded with the adoption of the Yamoussoukro Decision, which aims to gradually liberalize scheduled and non-scheduled inter-African air transport as defined in its Scope of Application.

=== Freedoms of the air ===
The treaty grants the free exercise of the first, second, third, fourth and fifth freedoms of the air to eligible airlines (as defined in the treaty) conducting scheduled and non-scheduled passenger and freight flight services between state parties. This allows flights to cross the airspaces and land on the territories of signatories with only prior notification. In comparison to deregulation packages like those implemented by the European Union, which provides unlimited rights to the third, fourth, fifth, seventh, eighth and ninth freedoms, the Yamoussoukro Decision only calls for a gradual shift to the full third, fourth and fifth freedoms. Article 3 of the treaty initially allowed states to limit fifth freedom rights to only specific circumstances, with said provision expiring 2 years after ratification on 12 August 2002.

=== Service liberalization ===
Non-physical barriers to frequency and capacity and tariffs are reduced by the Yamoussoukro Decision. Article 5 prevents the frequency and capacity of flights between any two cities from being restricted by state parties, and forbids its signatories to restrict capacity, number of flights, type of aircraft, or traffic rights, with the exception of certain environmental and technical factors. Article 4 stipulates that approval does not need to be granted by a state party before an airline can increase tariffs, but proposed increases must be filed before competent authorities (i.e. aeronautical authorities) 30 working days before they come into effect. Decreases in tariffs take effect immediately. As the treaty applies only to international air traffic between signatories, Article 4 does not apply to domestic air services internal to state parties.

=== Regulating competition ===
While Article 7 calls for state parties to ensure fair opportunity on a non-discriminatory basis to "designated African airline[s]" to facilitate competition, the distinction between fair and unfair regulations is not explicitly defined in the treaty. However, Annex 2 (referred to by Article 8) is claimed by some scholars to imply that the Monitoring Body has the responsibility to perform arbitration procedures and determine competition rules, given its defined obligations to prepare the Annexes for adoption and state its view on unfair and predatory competition practices at the request of state parties. Further power is granted by Article 9 to the African Air Transport Executing Agency to enforce fair competition rules and promote healthy competition.

=== Safety ===
As set forth in Article 6, an eligible airline must demonstrate that it can meet the standards set by the International Civil Aviation Organization (ICAO), and reaffirm its obligation to standard safety standards and practices in civil aviation. Simultaneously, state parties are obligated to recognize all air operating certificates, certificates of airworthiness, certificates of competency and personnel licenses from other state parties that are still in force, given that said certificates and licenses have issuing requirements meeting the standards of the ICAO. Outside of the context of the treaty, the ICAO regularly assesses the compliance of contracting states with its safety and security regulations. Safety audits are publicly accessible, while security audits are made strictly confidential.

== Implementation ==
=== Regional disparities ===
Implementation of the treaty varies based on the given state party and region. Sub-regional committees like the West African Economic and Monetary Union (WAEMU), Central African Economic and Monetary Community (CEMAC), Banjul Accord and Common Market for Eastern and Southern Africa (COMESA), as well as continent-level institutions like the African Civil Aviation Commission (AFCAC) and SAATM, have independently pursued implementation of different aspects of the treaty. This decentralized approach has resulted in wide inequalities, as countries like Egypt, South Africa, Morocco, and Ethiopia have made greater progress in liberalizing air traffic and increasing connectivity than most states in Central Africa. West African nations have been noted by observers to have made significant progress in implementing the treaty, with the WAEMU applying many of its principles in its internal market and the Banjul Accord having formed a multilateral air service agreement between member states.

=== SAATM ===
First announced in January 2018, the Single African Air Transport Market aims to implement the Yamoussoukro Decision on an AU-wide basis. As of 2017, the trade area encompassed 26 countries with a combined population of 527,000,000 and a total GDP of $624,000,000,000. The project aims to implement Item 7 of the AU's Agenda 2063, which calls for the liberalization of the civil aviation market. Members of the common market are entitled to hold and provide air transport services in each other's territories, and automatically benefit from the traffic rights stipulated by the treaty. States that have signed a "Solemn Commitment" to implement the terms of the treaty through the SAATM are required to report on their own progress and follow-up on each other, and have also committed to urging other AU member states to join the project.

=== Air connectivity ===
Evidence suggests that air connectivity has increased in many state parties to the treaty as a result of greater liberalization. Departure frequencies of flights originating in Addis Ababa have been shown to be higher when said flights are connecting to states that have more thoroughly deregulated air traffic, and studies have indicated that flight frequency, available seat kilometres and the number of destinations and routes correlate with the policies stipulated by the decision. However, the majority of intra-African flight routes have not been liberalized, with bilaterals remaining the predominant form of air transport agreement between African countries. Restrictions on market access and capacity persist, as well as bureaucratic barriers which prevent wider integration of African aviation markets like visa requirements.

=== Airline ownership ===
While a few state-owned carriers have shut down as a result of liberalization, the total number of airlines has significantly increased since the signing of the treaty. In 2013 there were 70 airlines based on the continent, more than double the number in 1994. Another notable phenomenon is the entrance of new competitors into markets left vacant by failing carriers, using the fifth freedom of the air to service new destinations. Some observers argue that this increase is a result of domestic reforms in some African countries allowing private carriers to compete, and there is little evidence that it is being directly caused by air liberalization between countries. The harmonization of competition law between member states called for by the SAATM has not yet been fully implemented, and state-owned airlines retain tax advantages in many countries.

== Membership ==
According to the World Bank, the Yamoussoukro Decision has been signed and ratified by all members of the AU except Djibouti, Equatorial Guinea, Eritrea, Eswatini, Gabon, Madagascar, Mauritania, Morocco, Somalia and South Africa. This leaves the following states legal parties to the treaty (excluding those currently suspended from the AU):

- Algeria
- Angola
- Benin
- Botswana
- Burundi
- Cameroon
- Cape Verde
- Central African Republic
- Chad
- Comoros
- Democratic Republic of the Congo
- Egypt
- Ethiopia
- Gabon
- Gambia
- Ghana
- Guinea-Bissau
- Ivory Coast
- Kenya
- Lesotho
- Liberia
- Libya
- Malawi
- Mauritius
- Mozambique
- Namibia
- Niger
- Nigeria
- Republic of the Congo
- Rwanda
- Sahrawi Arab Democratic Republic
- São Tomé and Príncipe
- Senegal
- Seychelles
- Sierra Leone
- South Sudan
- Tanzania
- Togo
- Tunisia
- Uganda
- Zambia
- Zimbabwe

== Reactions ==
=== African observers ===
Multilateral organizations in Africa have been largely supportive of the Yamoussoukro Decision. African Development Bank vice president Pierre Guislain declared in 2018 that the bank was "keen to support practical efforts by countries, regional organisations and companies from the aviation sector to increase connectivity and open up the African skies." Full implementation of the treaty through the SAATM is an explicit objective of the African Union, and is incorporated in the organization's Agenda 2063 program. In addition, countries with large airlines such as Rwanda and Togo have been strong proponents of the treaty, arguing that the creation of a single market will benefit the African aviation sector.

Many countries and organizations have been critical of the agreement, arguing that it will hurt smaller airlines and allow already large carriers like Ethiopian Airlines and South African Airways to dominate. Airline Operators of Nigeria (AON), an association of Nigerian airlines, denounced the SAATM and lobbied the Nigerian government to avoid implementing the single market. Advocating instead for the formation of regional airlines prior to further air liberalization, Ugandan president Yoweri Musevini opined in 2018 that a "[f]ew airlines are going to dominate and that is not good."

=== International observers ===
The International Air Transport Association (IATA) has commended the adoption of the Yamoussoukro Decision by the African Union, describing it as "cover[ing] competition and consumer protection and dispute settlement as these safeguard the efficient operation of the market." The organization predicted in 2014 that increased air connectivity could lead to an 80% increase in passenger traffic and 155,000 jobs. The United Nations Economic Commission for Africa (UNECA) and World Bank have also strongly supported the implementation of the treaty. Academics have largely approved of the terms of the decision, but some have criticized its implementation as geographically uneven and not sufficiently sweeping.

Countries outside of Africa have expressed interest in supporting the implementation of the treaty through investment and aid. During the 8th Ministerial Conference of the Forum on China-Africa Cooperation (FOCAC), the Chinese government announced it would encourage Chinese firms to participate in public-private partnerships (PPPs) and other projects related to the SAATM. The European Union has also committed to a €5,000,000 project with the African Union, assisting AFCAC in its role as the implementing agency of SAATM, assisting current members of the market in implementation and encouraging non-members to participate.
