= Kanayo Awani =

Nigerian banking executive

Executive Vice President, Intra-African Trade Bank, African Export–Import Bank (Afreximbank)
- Incumbent
- Assumed office 1 July 2022
- Appointed by: Afreximbank Board

Personal details
- Citizenship: Nigeria
- Education: University of Nigeria (B.Sc.); Harvard Kennedy School (MPA)
- Occupation: Banker

Kanayo Awani is a Nigerian banking executive who currently serves as the Executive Vice President of the Intra-African Trade Bank, African Export-Import Bank. Awani in her leadership position at Afreximbank contributed to advancing intra-African trade and industrialization, she has played a central role in supporting initiatives such as the African Continental Free Trade Area (AfCFTA). With an extensive career in both private and development finance. Awani has contributed to expanding the bank’s asset base and facilitating substantial trade financing across the Africa continent.

== Educational background ==
Awani earned her Bachelor of Science from the University of Nigeria. She further pursued a Master of Public Administration at Harvard Kennedy School of Government, where she was also awarded the Edward S. Mason Fellowship in Public Policy and Management. She has earned leadership credentials with certificates from institutions, including the Leadership Transition Programme Certificate from INSEAD in 2014, and the Oxford Strategic Leadership Programme Certificate from Said Business School in 2016.

== Career ==
=== Citigroup ===
Awani began her career at Citigroup in Nigeria in 1990, she worked in various capacities including Trade Services and Operations, Corporate Finance, and Corporate Banking. She later rose to the position of Vice President and Lead of Industrial & Commercial Corporates Division, establishing key business relationships with multinationals and leading local corporates across diverse sectors.

=== Afreximbank ===
In 2009, Awani transitioned to Afreximbank, as Assistant Director in Trade Finance and Branches; a department that later became one of the bank’s most profitable segments. Her contributions were key in steering the bank’s strategic focus on intra-African trade and industrialization. On 18 May 2016 she was Appointed Managing Director of Intra-African Trade Bank at African Export–Import Bank. During her tenure the bank’s backing for the AfCFTA negotiations concluded in the formalisation of the pact in Kigali by 44 countries in March 2018.

She oversaw the growth in the bank’s intra-African trade business from approximately 3% in 2016 to 28% by the end of 2021, while facilitating US$20 billion in trade and investment financing. She also pioneered the Intra-African Trade Champions programme, which has enabled leading African enterprises to broaden their operation across borders and promote “Made in Africa” products. she was the force behind the creation and execution of the Intra-African Trade Fair, with events in Cairo (2018) and Durban (2021) that collectively generated trade deals worth 42 of billions of dollars.

==== Executive Vice President ====
On 20 June 2022, Awani was appointed the Executive Vice President of the Intra-African Trade Bank at Afreximbank, by Afreximbank Board. She established Industrial Parks, Export Processing Zones, the harmonization of standards for pharmaceuticals and medical consumables during the COVID-19 pandemic, the development of the African Collaborative Transit Guarantee Scheme to ease cross-border trade, and the launch of the Creative Africa Nexus , a facility with a $1 billion allocation to support various sectors. In November 2023 she was elected to the Executive Committee of the global factoring body.

== Recognition ==
Awani’s contributions have earned her recognition across the financial and development sectors. She has been honoured by MIPAD as a Top 100 Most Influential Person of African Descent in 2020, and recognized among the 100 Leading Nigerian Women. In 2023 she was listed among TOP 50 Forbes Africa Women.

== Awards ==
- Africa Financial Industry Summit; Woman Leader Award (2022 )
- Africa Economy Builders Forum Award (2023)
- African Diaspora Advisory Board Global Woman Award.
