= Pokus =

Pokus may refer to:

- Pokus, fictional characters created by Estonian writer and graphic artist Edgar Valter
- Pokus, a 1992 TV production by Igor Ciel
- Pokus, a 2006 TV production starring Hana Vagnerová

== See also ==
- Poku
- Pocus
- Hocus Pocus (disambiguation)
