= Poku =

Poku is a surname. Notable people with the surname include:

- Abena Osei-Poku (born 1971), Ghanaian businessperson
- Ernest Poku (born 2004), Dutch footballer
- Ernest Owusu-Poku, Ghanaian police officer
- Francis Adu-Poku, Ghanaian politician
- Godfrey Poku (born 1990), English footballer
- Ignatius Kofi Poku Edusei (born 1963), Ghanaian politician
- Kwadwo Poku (disambiguation), multiple people
- Kwame Poku (born 2001), Ghanaian footballer
- Kwame Poku Agyekum (born 1936), Ghanaian politician
- Kwame Sanaa-Poku Jantuah (1922–2011), Ghanaian politician and diplomat
- Kwasi Poku (born 2003), Canadian soccer player
- Nana Poku (born 1988), Ghanaian footballer
- Ofresu Kwabena Poku (born 1923), Ghanaian politician
- Patricia Poku-Diaby, Ghanaian businessperson

Poku may also refer to:

- Queen Poku (1730-1750), queen and founder of the Baoule tribe of West Africa, part of the Ashanti Empire
- Aleksej Pokuševski (born 2001), Serbian basketball player nicknamed "Poku"
