= Obi Ozor =

Nigerian technology entrepreneur

Commissioner for Transportation Incumbent
- Governor: Peter Mbah

Personal details
- Education: Harvard Business School, Wharton School of Business
- Occupation: Public servant and Entrepreneur
- Awards: CNBC Africa All Africa Business Leaders Awards (AABLA, 2019 Disrupter of the Year by the Africa CEO Forum, World Economic Forum Young Global Leader

Obi Ozor is a Nigerian entrepreneur, business executive, and public servant. He co-founded Kobo360, a Lagos-headquartered digital logistics platform whose investors include Goldman Sachs, the International Finance Corporation, and Y Combinator.

In 2023, Ozor was appointed Commissioner for Transportation in Enugu State by Peter Mbah, the governor of Enugu State.

== Background and education ==
Ozor was born and raised as the last of eight children in the farming town of Abor in Enugu State, Nigeria. He studied biochemistry at the University of Michigan before graduating from the Wharton School of Business.

Ozor is also an alumnus of the Harvard Business School, having completed its Owner/President Management program.

== Career ==
Prior to founding Kobo360, Ozor worked as an investment banker at J.P. Morgan & Co. and in operations at Uber Nigeria.

At Kobo360, he served as CEO & Board Chair before stepping down in 2023 to focus on his appointment as the Commissioner for Transportation for Enugu State.

Ozor is also a co-founder and strategic advisor of Fig Finance, a provider of credit infrastructure for emerging markets.

== Awards ==
In 2019, Ozor received both the Innovator of the Year and Young Business Leader of the Year awards at the CNBC Africa All Africa Business Leaders Awards (AABLA). He was also named the 2019 Disrupter of the Year by the Africa CEO Forum.

In 2020, he was named one of Fortune’s 40 under 40 global technology leaders. He was selected to join Endeavor’s global network of high-impact entrepreneurs in the same year. Ozor he was also listed as one of Africa's New Tycoons by Forbes Africa.

In 2021, Ozor was named a World Economic Forum Young Global Leader.
