= AfCFTA Dispute Settlement Mechanism =

Mechanism for trade in Africa

The AfCFTA Dispute Settlement Mechanism is a mechanism established under the Protocol on Rules and Engagement on the settlement of disputes under the African Continental Free Trade Area (AfCFTA) agreement.

It was designed to provide a forum for the amicable, transparent and swift resolution of disputes between State Parties under the conditions of the agreement

== Components ==
The Dispute Settlement Mechanism consists of the following institutions;

=== Dispute Settlement Body ===
The Dispute Settlement Body is the main decision making responsible for the Dispute Settlement Mechanism. It is mandated to establish the panels and Appellate Body and their reports.

=== Adjudicating Panels ===
The Adjudicating Panels are responsible for hearing and resolving disputes between state parties. They are composed of three experts who are appointed by the Dispute Settlement Body.

=== Appellate Body ===
This is a second tier review body that hears appeals of panel decisions. It is composed of seven independent experts who are appointed by the DSB.

== See also ==
- African Continental Free Trade Area
