= George Elombi =

Cameroonian lawyer

George Elombi OV

4th President and Chairman of the African Export–Import Bank (Afreximbank)
- Incumbent
- Assumed office October, 2025
- Preceded by: Benedict Okey Oramah

Personal details
- Citizenship: Cameroon
- Education: London School of Economics, University of London; University of Yaoundé

George Elombi is a Cameroonian lawyer and the President and Chairman of the Board of Directors of Afreximbank. He is also a receipent of the Cameroon Knight of the Order of Valour

== Education ==
Elombi bagged his Masters of Law and PhD in Commercial arbitration from the London School of Economics. In 1989 he bagged a Maitrise-en-Droit from the University of Yaoundé, Cameroon.

== Career ==
Elombi began his professional career as a lecturer at the University of Hull in the United Kingdom. He joined the African Export-Import Bank (Afreximbank) in 1996 as a Legal Officer and held successive roles, including Senior Legal Officer (2001–2003), Chief Legal Officer (2003–2008), Deputy Director for Legal Services and Executive Secretary (2008–2010), and Director and Executive Secretary (2010–2015).

In 2015, he was appointed Executive Vice President in charge of Governance, Legal and Corporate Services. In this capacity, he led the establishment of Afreximbank Group subsidiaries, guided institutional governance, and oversaw legal and board operations. He also chaired the Bank’s Emergency Response Committee during the COVID-19 pandemic, helping mobilize over US$2 billion for vaccine access in Africa and the Caribbean. Under his leadership, the Bank raised approximately US$3.6 billion in equity by April 2025.

Elombi was appointed the fourth President of Afreximbank during the Bank’s 32nd Annual General Meeting held in Abuja, Nigeria and assumed office in October 2025 following an investiture ceremony in Cairo, Egypt.

== Award ==
In 2019, the government of Cameroon gave Elombi the Chevalier de l’Ordre de la Valeur which is known as the knight of the Order of Valour in English alongside Prof. Benedict Okey Oramah. It was announced by the prime Minister of Cameroon on the 13th of December 2019.
