= Spiro (company) =

African electric vehicle company

- Type: Private
- Industry: Electric vehicle
- Founded: 2022; 4 years ago
- Key people: Kaushik Burman (CEO)
- Website: www.spironet.com

Spiro is the largest electric vehicle (EV) company in Africa. It is headquartered in Dubai, United Arab Emirates, and was founded in 2022 with backing from Gagan Gupta's Equitane Group. The company specializes in electric motorbikes and battery swapping infrastructure. The company owns the fastest growing battery swapping infrastructure in Africa. As of 2025, Spiro operates across six African countries: Togo, Benin, Rwanda, Kenya, Uganda and Nigeria, with a mission to reduce the continent's fossil fuel dependency. The CEO of the company is Kaushik Burman.

== Funding ==
Founded in 2022, Spiro received initial funding of USD 85 million from Equitane Group, formerly Africa transformation and industrialization fund (ATIF).

In May 2023, Spiro received an investment of USD 63 million from Société Générale, to finance its expansion in Kenya and Uganda. The goal of this funding was to add 15,700 additional motos in those countries. The same year, it extended to Kenya, Rwanda, Uganda, and Nigeria. In Uganda, Spiro partnered with the government to replace its boda bodas - an emission-heavy moto taxi fleet - with electric two-wheelers.

In 2024, Spiro received USD 50 million from African Export-Import Bank (Afreximbank). In May, Spiro was listed in the Time 100 Most Influential Companies 2024.

In October 2025, the company raised $100mn in a round led by Fund for Export Development in Africa (FEDA), the impact investment arm of Afreximbank. This is the largest funding ever seen in electric vehicle in Africa.

== Business model and strategy ==
In August 2023, Spiro launched twin assembly plants in Benin and Togo.

In January 2024, Asset financing company Watu Credit and Spiro Kenya, announced a partnership to enhance access to financing for electric motorbikes in Kenya.

In May 2024, the company declared a fleet of 14,000 electric two-wheelers, and nine million battery swaps in five countries. The same month, the company partnered with Max, a tech platform that democratises access to vehicle ownership. In July the startup overtook its competitor Ampersand, a Kigali based electric motorbike company.

In September 2024, Spiro launched a manufacturing centre on Old Mombasa Road in Nairobi.

In February 2025, Spiro declared having 18,000 bikes in circulation, 11 million battery swaps and 428 million CO_{2}-free kilometres driven. The company aims at having 2 million bikes in circulation in Africa by 2030.

In 2025, Spiro plans to open two electric vehicle assembly plants in 2025 in Kenya and in Ogun State, Nigeria. In January Spiro entered into a partnership with ZOOMe, an electric mobility firm in Nigeria.

As of November 2025, Spiro has more than 60,000 bikes in circulation and 1,500 swap stations. Riders using its network have completed more than 26 million battery swaps, enabling more than 800 million km of low-carbon travel. The startup has established four assembly facilities in Kenya, Rwanda, Uganda and Nigeria

== See also ==
- Shegun Adjadi Bakari
- Gagan Gupta
