= Fund for Export Development in Africa =

The Fund for Export Development in Africa (FEDA) is the development investment arm of African Export–Import Bank (which is also known as Afreximbank).

== History ==
In 2016, Fund for Export Development in Africa was initiated as "Fund for the promotion of intra-African trade and industrialization and export development".

FEDA was established to address the US$110 billion financing gap hindering intra-African trade, value-added export development, and the development of industrial value chains across the continent. Rwanda, where FEDA is headquartered was the first country to sign the FEDA Establishment Agreement. São Tomé and Príncipe signed the agreement in June 2023. Nigeria became the 16th country to accede the agreement in May 2024.

Egypt and Malawi joined in September and October 2024 respectively. Other members include Mauritania, Guinea, Togo, South Sudan, Zimbabwe, Kenya, Chad, Republic of the Congo, Gabon, Sierra Leone, Equatorial Guinea, Ghana.

== Funding and investments ==
In 2021, FEDA led the $56 million series B round for Kobo360.

In 2022, FEDA raised $670 million to drive different interventions aimed at developing trade in Africa.

In February 2023, Geregu Power Plc announced that FEDA had purchased 5% of its shares.

In October 2024, FEDA contributed $300 million investment to ARISE IPP's $443 million capital raise.

In October 2025, Spiro raised $100mn in a round led by FEDA.
