= Kobo360 =

Pan African Logistics company

- Company type: Private
- Industry: Logistics services
- Founded: 2018; 8 years ago
- Founder: Obi Ozor and Ife Oyedele II
- Headquarters: Lagos, Nigeria, Nigeria
- Area served: Sub-Saharan Africa
- Products: transport, clearing and forwarding, and warehousing services
- Website: https://kobo360.com

Kobo360 is an African tech-enabled digital logistics platform, headquartered in Lagos and connects cargo owners to truck owners, with a physical presence in 6 African countries, including Nigeria, Ghana, Kenya, Burkina Faso, and Ivory Coast.

Kobo's mission is to simplify Africa's logistics and supply chain by making it more efficient through technology. Its customers are mostly large multinationals and manufacturing and production companies. Kobo360's platform matches cargo owners with truck owners to solve the delay faced in getting goods delivered on time. The company was founded by Obi Ozor and Ife Oyedele II. Kobo360 also has an app that enables users to carry out their activities easily.

In 2019, Kobo360 had achieved product-market fit, and the company was rapidly expanding as a result of a $30 million equity and debt investment from Goldman Sachs, International Finance Corporation, TLcom Capital and other investors.

In an interview with TechCrunch, KOBO360 CEO, Obi Ozor described the issues that arose as a result of the pandemic and the need to rethink strategy. He also discussed how the company dealt with them, as well as its current state of stable growth and sustainability.

In March 2023, Kobo360 was listed among the "25 Rising African Tech Startups To Watch Out For In 2023" by African Folder.

== Funding and investments ==
Kobo360 raised $20 million in a Series A round headed by Goldman Sachs in 2019 and $10 million in working capital funding from Nigerian commercial banks.

Kobo360 raised an additional $56 million in its series B round led by Afrexim Bank's equity arm - The Fund For Export Development in Africa (FEDA), with participation from existing investors.

== Awards and recognition ==
In 2019 the company was nominated as a Disrupter of the Year finalist at the Africa CEO Forum Awards. In 2022, the company was adjudged the best E-Logistics Platform at The Digital Tech Awards.

== Leadership ==
In August, 2023, Cikü Mugambi, was announced as the new CEO, as Obi Ozor stepped aside following his political appointment. Fola Adeola, a seasoned entrepreneur and investor, was also appointed as the Chairman of the Board of Directors.
