= Afrexim Bank House, Kampala =

Building in Uganda

- Location within Kampala

General information
- Type: Mixed Use
- Location: Nakasero, Kampala, Uganda
- Coordinates: 00°19′18″N 32°35′15″E
- Construction started: November 2024
- Completed: Q4 2027 (Expected)
- Cost: US$100 million

Afrexim Bank House, Kampala, also Kampala Afreximbank Africa Trade Centre (Kampala AATC), is a building under construction in Uganda, that will serve as the regional headquarters of Afrexim Bank's Eastern Africa region, covering 14 countries: Comoros, Djibouti, Eritrea, Ethiopia, Kenya, Madagascar, Mauritius, Rwanda, Somalia, Sudan, South Sudan, Seychelles, Tanzania and Uganda.

The building will host the Afreximbank Africa Trade Centre (AATC), for Eastern Africa. This comprises the permanent headquarters of the regional office, a five-star hotel, a business information centre, a conference centre and a technology incubation hub. The Kampala AATC is also expected to host offices of other global, continental and regional development and financial institutions.

== Location ==
The building is planned to sit on a piece of land in Nakasero, in the Central Division of Kampala, the capital and largest city in the country. The piece of land measures 2.43 acres (0.98 ha). The land was a donation from the Ugandan government to Afrexim Bank, for the purpose of building the bank's regional headquarters for the bank's Eastern Africa region.

== Overview ==
Afrexim Bank maintains headquarters in Cairo, Egypt. The bank also maintains five regional branches at Abidjan, Abuja, Harare, Kampala and Yaounde. The bank's Eastern Region headquarters were originally planned to be located in Nairobi, Kenya. However, after a three-year delay in obtaining Kenyan authorization, the bank switched to Kampala, Uganda.

The headquarters were opened in late 2019, after agreements were signed between the bank and Ugandan government officials. The interim, temporary offices are located at Rwenzori Towers, off of Nakasero Road, in Kampala.

To expedite the establishment of permanent headquarters, the government of Uganda donated land along Yusuf Lule Road, in Kampala for the bank to build its regional offices.

== Construction ==
Construction is expected to start once the feasibility studies and architectural plans are finalized and approved. The construction is planned to cost about US$120 to US$150 million. Construction began in November 2024 and is expected to conclude in 36 months.

== See also ==
- List of tallest buildings in Kampala
- Uganda Ministry of Finance
