= African Union Passport =

Common passport document for citizens of African Union member states

African Union passport
- The front cover of an African Union diplomatic passport

- The picture page of an African Union service passport
- Type: Passport
- Issued by: African Union
- First issued: July 17, 2016
- Purpose: Identification
- Eligibility: Citizen of an African Union member state

The African Union Passport is a proposed passport document that is set to replace existing nationally issued African Union member state passports and exempt bearers from having to obtain any visas for all 55 states in Africa. It was announced on July 17, 2016, at the 27th Ordinary Session of the African Union that was held in Kigali in Rwanda by Rwandan President Paul Kagame and the late Chadian President Idriss Déby. The passport was planned to be rolled out and ready for use at borders worldwide by 2023, however the rollout has since been delayed indefinitely.

Future proposed endeavors for the passports have included the planned initiative for visa free travel – known as "Visa Free Africa" under the auspice of the African Union. and eventual freedom of movement within the bloc.

== Types ==
There are three types of African Union passport that will be issued:

Ordinary passport
These passports are issued to citizens and are intended for occasional travel, such as vacations and business trips. They contain 32 pages, and are valid for 5 years.

Official/Service passport
These passports are issued to officials attached to government institutions who have to travel on official business.

Diplomatic passport
Issued to diplomats and consuls for work-related travel, and to their accompanying dependents.

Temporary passport
These passports are issued to travelling citizens or natives of African countries that cannot get hold of their passports due to various reasons including robbery, theft or accidents. They may last for 6 months to a year.

== Design ==
The passport has inscriptions in Arabic, English, French, Portuguese, and Swahili. The African Union anthem's lyrics are printed on the page immediately after the picture page.

== Recognition and acceptance ==
=== African Union Member States ===
State	Visa Required	ETA Required
Algeria		
Angola	Yes	
Benin		
Botswana		
Burkina Faso		
Burundi		
Cameroon		
Cape Verde		
Central African Republic		
Chad		
Comoros		
Democratic Republic of the Congo		
Republic of the Congo		
Djibouti		
Egypt		
Equatorial Guinea		
Eritrea		
Eswatini		
Ethiopia	No	
Gabon		
Gambia		
Ghana	No	
Guinea		
Guinea-Bissau		
Ivory Coast	No	
Kenya		
Lesotho		
Liberia		
Libya		
Madagascar		
Malawi		
Mali		
Mauritania	Yes (on the spot)	
Mauritius		
Morocco		
Mozambique		
Namibia		
Niger		
Nigeria		
Rwanda	No	
Sahrawi Arab Democratic Republic		
São Tomé and Príncipe		
Senegal		
Seychelles		
Sierra Leone		
Somalia		
South Africa		
South Sudan		
Sudan		
Tanzania	No	
Togo		
Tunisia		
Uganda		
Zambia	No	
Zimbabwe		

=== Common area passports in Africa ===
- ECOWAS passport

== See also ==
- African diaspora
- Tourism in Africa
- Rail transport in Africa
- Single African Air Transport Market
- African Continental Free Trade Area
- Interpol Travel Document
