= Tourism in Africa =

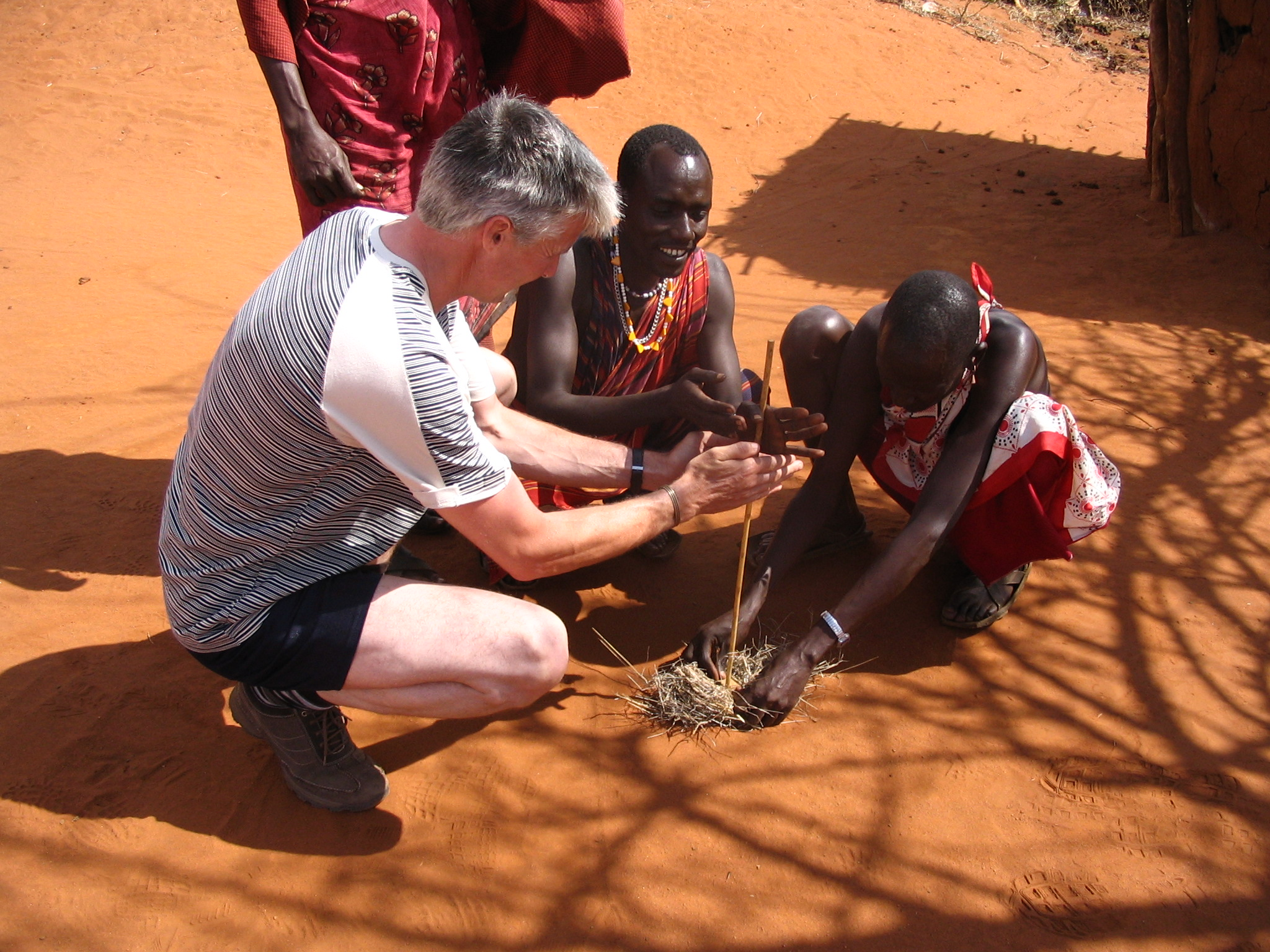
Cultural tourism in Kenya in 2005

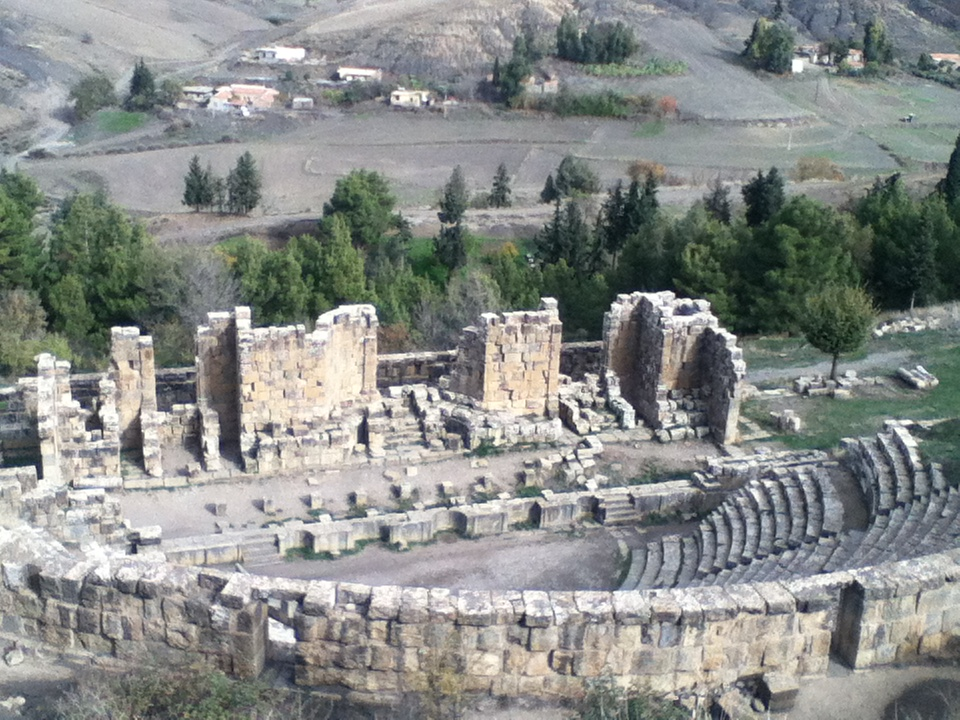
Roman ruins in the east of Algeria

Tourism is an important economic sector for many countries in Africa. There are many countries that benefit heavily from tourism like Kenya, Uganda, Algeria, Egypt, South Africa, Morocco, Tunisia, Ghana and Tanzania. The touristic particularity of Africa lies in the wide variety of points of interest, diversity and multitudes of landscapes as well as the rich cultural heritage. Also, an ecotourist industry is present in some African countries (e.g., South Africa, Kenya, Namibia, Rwanda, Zambia, Uganda, Mozambique, etc.).

== Overview ==
Countries in Africa started investing in their tourism markets since the late 1960s and 1970s and are at different levels of tourism development. Countries in the continent of Africa are typically categorized using Butler's 1980 Tourist Area Life Cycle (TALC) model which is a common model that describes six specific stages of tourism development for all countries worldwide: exploration, involvement, development, consolidation and stagnation.

However, a World Bank study in 2011 classified also African countries in to 4 categories based on performance. These performance groupings were based on indicators such as business environment; tourism regulation, infrastructure, resources, tourism income, number of visitors and the potential growth of the market.

- “pre-emergent”: Somalia, Sudan, Eritrea, Comoros, Togo, Guinea, Chad, Guinea Bissau, Niger, Central African Rep., Congo D.R., Liberia, Congo Rep., Equatorial Guinea
- “potential”: Madagascar, Ethiopia, Mauritania, Mali, Benin, São Tomé and Príncipe, Sierra Leone, Burundi, Côte d’Ivoire, Nigeria, Lesotho, Angola, Swaziland, Cameroon, and Gabon
- “emerging”: Seychelles, Zambia, Uganda, Rwanda, The Gambia, Senegal, Zimbabwe, Burkina Faso, Malawi, and Mozambique
- “consolidating”: Morocco, South Africa, Mauritius, Tanzania, Kenya, Cape Verde, Ghana, Namibia, Botswana.

Inter-Africa tourism has also become an important component of the continent's tourism market supported by improving regional connectivity and initiativs aimed at reducing barriers to trave. Air connectivity, Visa policies and regional integration remain significant factors influencing travel between African countries.

== Tourism sectors ==
=== Ecotourism ===
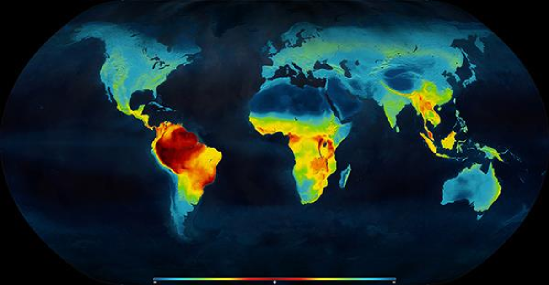
Map latitudinal gradient of biodiversity (Mannion 2014), indicating the biodiversity richness of the African continent

Ecotourism is the concept of responsible trips and travel to areas that might be protected and especially fragile. The intent is to create as little detrimental impact on the environment as possible. In some locations (such as Gorongosa National Park) where the wildlife has previously been decimated, rewilding has been done and much of the wildlife has been brought back (along with vegetation, thus allowing the environment to sequester more carbon than what was previously the case). This return of wildlife has created tourism opportunities (wildlife viewing, safari trips) allowing for to bringing in of financial revenue. It also requires personnel such as park rangers, to be present, thus creating local employment opportunities.

=== Historical sites and monuments ===
Africa has many historic structures that have survived from ancient civilizations as well as more recent structures of interest to tourists. Ancient historical sites include the Pyramids and temples in both Egypt and Sudan; The Obelisk of Axum from Ethiopia; the ruins of ancient Zimbabwe's trading city, Great Zimbabwe; and the Palace of Emperor Fasilides in Ethiopia. More recent structures that attract tourism includes the old slave castles in Ghana, Elmina Castle and Cape Coast Castle, which are also sited for heritage tourism. It also includes the highest monument in the world, the African Renaissance Monument in Senegal.

=== Medical tourism ===
Due to advance in technologies, techniques and practices and lower costs, Africa has experienced a surge in medical tourism and health tourism. Countries that are destinations for medical and health tourism packages include Algeria, Ghana, Ivory Coast, Kenya, Mauritius, Morocco, Nigeria, Rwanda, South Africa, Tanzania and Tunisia. The top destinations for European visitors include Egypt, Tunisia, and South Africa. South Africa is the top destination for both international tourists and regional tourists from other African countries.

=== Tea tourism ===
Africa has a rich history of tea cultivation which has given rise to several countries becoming growing tea tourism destinations. Malawi was the first country to grow tea in Africa, and it has many tea estates that are decades old. Countries like Morocco, Kenya, Malawi, and South Africa are large tea-producing countries that are frequented by tea tourists. South Africa's tea tourism market is focused on rooibos tea.

== Tourism by arrivals ==
All of the data presented here is from the World Tourism Organization (UNWTO) and from "Reviewing Africa in the Global Tourism Economy." The following table shows the number of arrivals in each country:67

Country (Note: No data is available for Benin, Burkina Faso, Central African Republic, Chad, Comoros, Republic of the Congo, Côte d'Ivoire, Equatorial Guinea, Ethiopia, Gabon, Ghana, Guinea-Bissau, Kenya, Libya, Madagascar, Malawi, Mauritania, Mozambique, Namibia, Niger, Nigeria, Rwanda, Sudan, Tanzania and Zambia.)	Arrivals (2024)
Morocco	17,500,000
Egypt	15,000,000
Angola	210,000
Botswana	1,559,000
Burundi	148,000
Cameroon	210,000
Cape Verde	198,000
Democratic Republic of the Congo	61,000
Djibouti	30,000
Algeria	4,244,000
Eritrea	83,000
Gambia	111,000
Guinea	45,000
Lesotho	304,000
Mali	143,000
Mauritius	934,827 (2020)
São Tomé and Príncipe	11,000
Senegal	769,000
Seychelles	129,000
Sierra Leone	40,000
South Africa	7,518,000
Eswatini	839,000
Togo	81,000
Tunisia	6,378,000
Uganda	1,468,000 (2017)
Zimbabwe	1,559,000

== Tourism by receipts ==
The following map and data depict the income from tourism in US dollar equivalent:

Country (Note: No data is available for Algeria, Angola, Benin, Burkina Faso, Cameroon, Central African Republic, Chad, Comoros, Republic of the Congo, Côte d'Ivoire, Democratic Republic of the Congo, Djibouti, Equatorial Guinea, Ethiopia, Gabon, Gambia, Ghana, Guinea, Guinea-Bissau, Libya, Madagascar, Mali, Mauritania, Niger, Nigeria, Rwanda, Sao Tome and Principe, Senegal, Togo, Swaziland and Zambia.)	Receipts (2020) in US$
Botswana	$562,000,000
Burundi	$2,000,000
Cape Verde	$123,000,000
Egypt	$16,851,000,000
Eritrea	$66,000,000
Kenya	$879,000,000
Lesotho	$30,000,000
Malawi	$26,000,000
Morocco	$4,617,000,000
Mozambique	$130,000,000
Namibia	$348,000,000
Reunion	$384,000,000
Seychelles	$192,000,000
Sierra Leone	$83,000,000
South Africa	$7,327,000,000
Sudan	$89,000,000
Uganda	$1,400,000,000
Tunisia	$2,063,000,000
Tanzania	$4,468,000,000
Zimbabwe	$1,559,000

== Visa policies to visit ==
- Algeria
- Angola
- Benin
- Botswana
- Burkina Faso
- Burundi
- Cameroon
- Cape Verde
- Central African Republic
- Chad
- Comoros
- Democratic Republic of the Congo
- Republic of the Congo
- Djibouti
- Egypt
- Equatorial Guinea
- Eritrea
- Eswatini
- Ethiopia
- Gabon
- The Gambia
- Ghana
- Guinea
- Guinea-Bissau
- Ivory Coast
- Kenya
- Lesotho
- Liberia
- Libya
- Madagascar
- Malawi
- Mali
- Mauritania
- Mauritius
- Morocco
- Mozambique
- Namibia
- Niger
- Nigeria
- Rwanda
- São Tomé and Príncipe
- Senegal
- Seychelles
- Sierra Leone
- Somalia
- South Africa
- South Sudan
- Sudan
- Tanzania
- Togo
- Tunisia
- Uganda
- Zambia
- Zimbabwe

== See also ==
- Economy of Africa
- ECOWAS ECOTOUR
- Africa Travel Association
- African Continental Free Trade Area
- Rail transport in Africa
- Single African Air Transport Market
- CARICOM passport (Caribbean Community)
- UN Decade on Ecosystem Restoration
- Safari lodge
- UN Tourism
