= Single African Air Transport Market =

Project of African countries to create a single air transport market

- Participating countries
- Location: Africa
- Type: Air transport agreement
- Participants: 34 states

Establishment
  - Yamoussoukro Declaration: 1988
  - Yamoussoukro Decision: 1999
  - SAATM launched: 28 January 2018
- Website au.int/saatm

The Single African Air Transport Market (SAATM) is a project of the African Union to create a single market for air transport in Africa. Once completely in force, the single market is supposed to allow significant freedom of air transport in Africa, advancing the AU's Agenda 2063.

Primarily, the goal of the SAATM is to fully implement the 1999 Yamoussoukro Decision. This means that all participants agree to lift market access restrictions for airlines, remove restrictions on ownership, grant each other extended air traffic rights (first through fifth freedoms, not affecting cabotage rights), and liberalise flight frequency and capacity limits. Both passenger and cargo aviation are included. It also seeks to harmonise safety and security regulations in aviation, based on ICAO requirements. Oversight over the SAATM is exercised by the African Union, its Regional Economic Communities, and the African Civil Aviation Commission (AFCAC).

== History ==
The benefit of liberalising air traffic, particularly the fifth freedom, was first acknowledged in the Yamoussoukro Declaration of 1988. This declaration was reaffirmed in 1999, when the African Union passed the Yamoussoukro Decision. However, the implementation of the decision faced obstacles, as regulatory bodies did not become operational as stipulated in the agreement. A number of member states did not grant fifth freedom rights to airlines from other countries.

In 2015, the Declaration for the Establishment of a Single African Air Transport Market laid the framework for a single market implementing the Yamoussoukro Decision to be established by 2017. This deadline was later extended with plans to launch the single market during the 30th African Union Summit in Addis Ababa. There, the launch of the SAATM was then made official on 28 January 2018 by Rwandan President Paul Kagame, as new Chairperson of the Africa Union. The organisation sought to have 40 members by the end of 2019.

== Participation ==
Twenty-three member states of the African Union originally agreed to join the SAATM as starting participants. As of July 2022 there were 34 countries participating:

- Benin
- Botswana
- Burkina Faso
- Cameroon
- Cape Verde
- Chad
- Central African Republic
- DR Congo
- Congo
- Côte d'Ivoire
- Egypt
- Ethiopia
- Equatorial Guinea
- Gabon
- The Gambia
- Ghana
- Guinea
- Guinea-Bissau
- Kenya
- Lesotho
- Liberia
- Mali
- Morocco
- Mozambique
- Namibia
- Niger
- Nigeria
- Rwanda
- Senegal
- Sierra Leone
- South Africa
- Swaziland
- Togo
- Zimbabwe

== Evaluation ==
Some African governments and airlines have criticised the project. Especially smaller airlines, as well as the Ugandan government, allege that the agreement would lead to few big airlines dominating the market, thus stifling competition.

The African Development Bank, among other analysts, predicted that the SAATM would lead to cheaper flights, greater passenger volumes and economic benefits.

The International Air Transport Association commended the African Union for launching the single market, but warned that more work would be required to effectively implement the policy.

Abdérahmane Berthé, secretary general of the African Airlines Association, said that the COVID-19 pandemic has helped the implementation of the SAATM.

== See also ==
- African Continental Free Trade Area
- African Union Passport
- Rail transport in Africa
- Caribbean Single Market and Economy
- European Common Aviation Area
