= African Civil Aviation Commission =

African Union agency

- Abbreviation: AFCAC
- Established: 17 January 1969; 57 years ago
- Type: Specialised agency of the African Union
- Purpose: civil aviation
- Headquarters: Dakar, Senegal
- Coordinates: 14°44′56″N 17°29′21″W
- Secretary General: Tefera Mekonnen
- Website: afcac.org/en/

The African Civil Aviation Commission (AFCAC; French: Commission africaine de l'aviation civile, CAFAC) is an agency of the African Union headquartered in Dakar, Senegal.

The purpose is to assist member states with a framework to discuss and plan the coordination, cooperation, development, and regulation of civil aviation in Africa. AFCAC is the executing agency of the Single African Air Transport Market, which implements the Yamoussoukro Decision. Their cooperation with the International Civil Aviation Organization includes promoting the application of their Standards and Recommended Practices.

The agency receives administrative and financial assistance from ICAO and has also gotten funding from the African Development Bank. As of 2015 many states did not pay their membership dues and 90% of AFCAC's income was spent on salaries and administrative costs.

== History ==
The AFCAC was founded on 17 January 1969 in Addis Ababa, Ethiopia during a Conference called by the International Civil Aviation Organization and the Organisation of African Unity (now the African Union). It was initially approved provisionally until 12 January 1972 when 20 States had ratified the constitution. Currently all but one African state have since ratified the constitution.

In 1988 African Aviation Ministers met in Yamoussoukro to outline the future of the African Aviation Industry. This would later be known as the Yamoussoukro Declaration. 10 years later ministers would meet again to elaborate and finalize the Yamoussoukro Declaration, later known as the Yamoussoukro Decision. By removing restrictions on traffic rights, capacity and frequency, the Yamoussoukro Decision sought to liberalize African air transport markets. The Yamoussoukro Decision was adopted by the Assembly of Heads of State and Government in July 2000, and has precedence over any and all agreements between states.

In 2001 a revised constitution was adopted, and later in 2009 a new constitution was adopted by the AFCAC. The new constitution would take effect April 2021 and states who had not ratified it would lose their membership to the AFCAC.

== Mission & Objectives ==
The AFCAC's mission statement: "We facilitate cooperation and coordination among African States towards the development of integrated and sustainable Air transport systems; and foster the implementation of International Civil Aviation Organization SARPs."

The objectives of the AFCAC are:

1. Develop, coordinate, and maintain a strong Aviation Safety system and culture.
2. Encourage the adoption of a common Air Traffic Management system.
3. Identify, monitor, and mitigate safety risks to civil aviation.
4. All safety related disciplines will work towards implementing safety management system.
5. The implementation of International Civil Aviation Organization provisions and SARPs - Standards and Recommended Practices.
6. Coordination of all civil aviation in Africa.
7. Cooperate between other organization related to the development of civil aviation.
8. Promote exchange of safety related information between African states.
9. Upgrade of air safety related systems.
10. Reduce the African accident rate from 8.6 to 2.5 per million departures.
11. African-Indian Ocean Cooperative Inspectorate Scheme (AFI-CIS) was established to assist States address Safety oversight related concerns.

== Structure ==
The AFCAC is structured with three organs, The Plenary, The Bureau, and The Secretariat. Each of these has unique powers and duties.

The Plenary is the most powerful of the three and is composed of member states. It meets every three years to discuss issues areas such as elections, appointments, policy approvals, and enforcement of rules. When The Plenary concludes it produces a report on their meeting, and specifically the progress of the implementation of the Yamoussoukro Decision to an Executive Council.

The Bureau is a body elected by and reporting to The Plenary, composed of the current president and five vice presidents, one from each region established by the African Union. As the administrative organ of the AFCAC, it is responsible for organizing the Plenary's sessions, implementing decisions and resolutions set-fourth by The Plenary, and supervising The Secretariat. The Bureau may also be given other directives by the Plenary.

The Secretariat is composed of officials appointed by The Plenary and headed by the Secretary General. Included in the Secretariat are: Corporate Services, Safety and Technical Services, Air Transport, and the Office of The Secretariat General. One key role of The Secretariat is ensuring resolutions and decisions of The Plenary are implemented. Additional functions of The Secretariat include day to day operations including but not limited to: budgets, revenue collection, work programs, strategic objectives, projects, activities, and staffing.

== Current Leadership ==
- President of the Bureau: Silas Udahemuka
- Vice President, Central Region: François Edly Follot
- Vice President, Eastern Region: Emile Arao
- Vice President, Northern Region: Abdoulaye Ngaïde
- Vice President, Southern Region: Andile Mtetwa-Amaeshi
- Vice President, Western Region: Colonel-major Hamadou Ousseini Ibrahim
- AFCAC AFI Group coordinator: Engr. Mahmoud Sani Ben Tukur
- Secretary General: Adefunke Adeyemi

== Members ==
To become a member state of the African Civil Aviation Commission, states must either be a member of the African Union or the Economic Community of African States (ECA). Currently all but one member of the AU are members of the AFCAC, all of which are listed below. Sahrawi Arab Democratic Republic is currently the only recognized member of the African Union not in the AFCAC.

- Algeria
- Angola
- Benin
- Botswana
- Burkina Faso
- Burundi
- Cameroon
- Cape Verde
- Central African Republic
- Chad
- Comoros
- Republic of the Congo
- Democratic Republic of the Congo
- Djibouti
- Egypt
- Equatorial Guinea
- Eritrea
- Eswatini
- Ethiopia
- Gabon
- Gambia
- Ghana
- Guinea
- Guinea-Bissau
- Ivory Coast
- Kenya
- Lesotho
- Liberia
- Libya
- Madagascar
- Malawi
- Mali
- Mauritania
- Mauritius
- Morocco
- Mozambique
- Namibia
- Niger
- Nigeria
- Rwanda
- São Tomé and Príncipe
- Senegal
- Seychelles
- Sierra Leone
- Somalia
- South Africa
- South Sudan
- Sudan
- Tanzania
- Togo
- Tunisia
- Uganda
- Zambia
- Zimbabwe
