= Kwadwo Poku =

Kwadwo Poku or Kwadwo Opoku may refer to:

- Kwadwo Poku (footballer, born 1985), Ghanaian professional footballer
- Kwadwo Poku (footballer, born 1992), Ghanaian footballer
- Kwadwo Poku (footballer, born 1993), Ghanaian footballer

== See also ==
- Kwadwo Opoku, born 2001, Ghanaian footballer
