= Mobile Money =

Mobile payment system

African MobileMoney
- Operating area: Africa

Mobile Money is a mobile payment system based on accounts held by a mobile operator and accessible from subscribers' mobile phones. The conversion of cash into electronic value (and vice versa) happens at retail stores (or agents). All transactions are authorised and recorded in real-time using SMS. in the year 2007, M-PESA was launched.

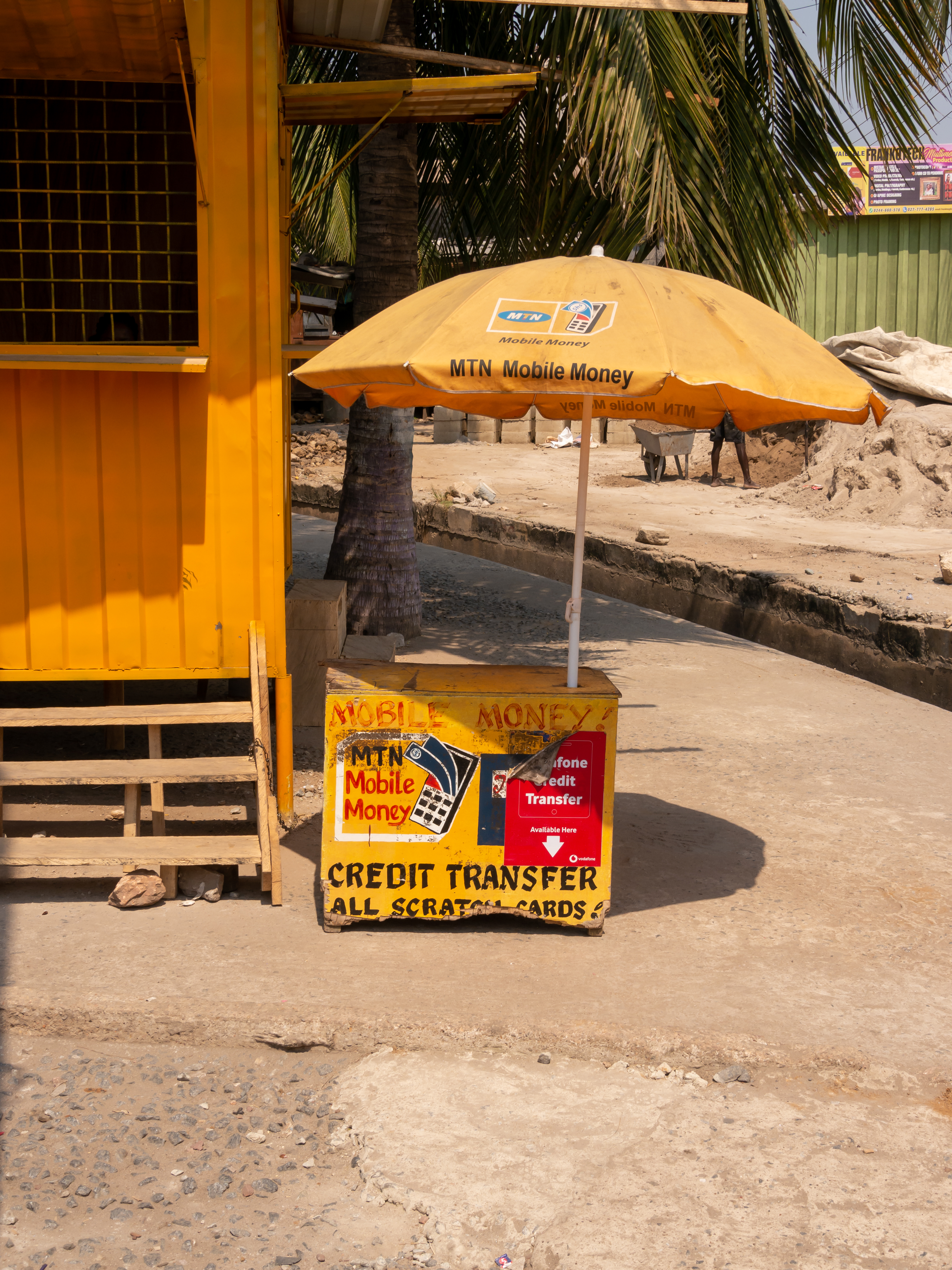
MTN Mobile Money agent's stand in Ghana

In 2008, a Ugandan software developer named Ronald Egesa of Mobitrix Uganda Ltd was reported by the leading newspapers to have developed the country's first mobile phone bank that he called SmartCash It was reported to be a network independent service.

In 2009, GSMA made a grant to Safaricom to support the development of a social transfer payment project via M-Pesa.

M-PESA was developed by Vodafone and first deployed by its Kenyan affiliate Safaricom. In May 2012, there were over 15 million customers of M-PESA in Kenya.

== Countries with a Mobile Money Presence ==
Current Mobile Money Presence in African Countries
Currency ISO	Country	Currency
XOF	Benin	CFA franc
BWP	Botswana	Botswana pula
XOF	Burkina Faso	CFA franc
BIF	Burundi	Burundi franc
XAF	Cameroon	CFA franc
XAF	Chad	CFA franc
CDF	Democratic Republic of the Congo	Congolese franc
EGP	Egypt	Egyptian pound
ETB	Ethiopia	Ethiopian birr
XAF	Gabon	CFA franc
GHS	Ghana	Ghanaian cedi
GNF	Guinea	Guinean franc
XOF	Guinea-Bissau	CFA franc
XOF	Ivory Coast	CFA franc
KES	Kenya	Kenyan shilling
LSL	Lesotho	Lesotho loti
LRD	Liberia	Liberian dollar
MGA	Madagascar	Malagasy ariary
MWK	Malawi	Malawian kwacha
XOF	Mali	CFA franc
MRO	Mauritania	Mauritanian ouguiya
MUR	Mauritius	Mauritian rupee
MAD	Morocco	Moroccan dirham
MZN	Mozambique	Mozambican metical
NAD	Namibia	Namibian dollar
XOF	Niger	CFA franc
NGN	Nigeria	Nigerian naira
RWF	Rwanda	Rwandan franc
XOF	Senegal	CFA franc
SLL	Sierra Leone	Sierra Leonean leone
SOS	Somalia	shilling
ZAR	South Africa	South African rand
SDG	Sudan	Sudanese pound
SZL	Swaziland	Swazi lilangeni
TZS	Tanzania	Tanzanian shilling
XOF	Togo	CFA franc
TND	Tunisia	Tunisian dinar
UGX	Uganda	Ugandan shilling
ZMW	Zambia	Zambian kwacha
ZWD	Zimbabwe	Zimbabwean dollar
