= University College of Engineering, Osmania University =

Engineering college in Hyderabad, Telangana, India

College of Engineering, Osmania University,
- Type: Education and Research Institution
- Established: 1929
- Affiliations: Osmania University
- Location: Hyderabad, Telangana, India
- Campus: Urban
- Website: uceou

The University College of Engineering, Osmania University (UCE) is an autonomous engineering college located in Hyderabad, India. The college offers undergraduate B.E. and postgraduate M.E. courses.

== History ==
Established in 1929 the University College of Engineering is the oldest and the biggest in Telangana. Established in 1929, eleven years after the formation of Osmania University, it was the sixth engineering college to be established in the whole of British India.

The college moved to its present permanent building in 1947. Today it is the biggest among the campus colleges of Osmania University.

The college was conferred autonomous status in 1994.

== Departments ==
The college has the following departments:

- Artificial intelligence and Machine Learning
- Biomedical Engineering
- Civil Engineering
- Computer Science and Engineering
- Electrical Engineering
- Electronics and Communication Engineering
- Mechanical Engineering
- Mining Engineering
- Chemistry
- Physics
- English
- Mathematics

== Ranking ==
University and College rankings

Engineering – India
- NIRF (2023): 100-150 band
- Government colleges
- Outlook India (2021): 24

Among government engineering colleges in India, UCE was ranked 24 by Outlook India in 2021. It is ranked in the band 100-150 among engineering colleges by the National Institutional Ranking Framework (NIRF) in 2023.
