= Wode Maya =

Ghanaian YouTuber (born 1990)

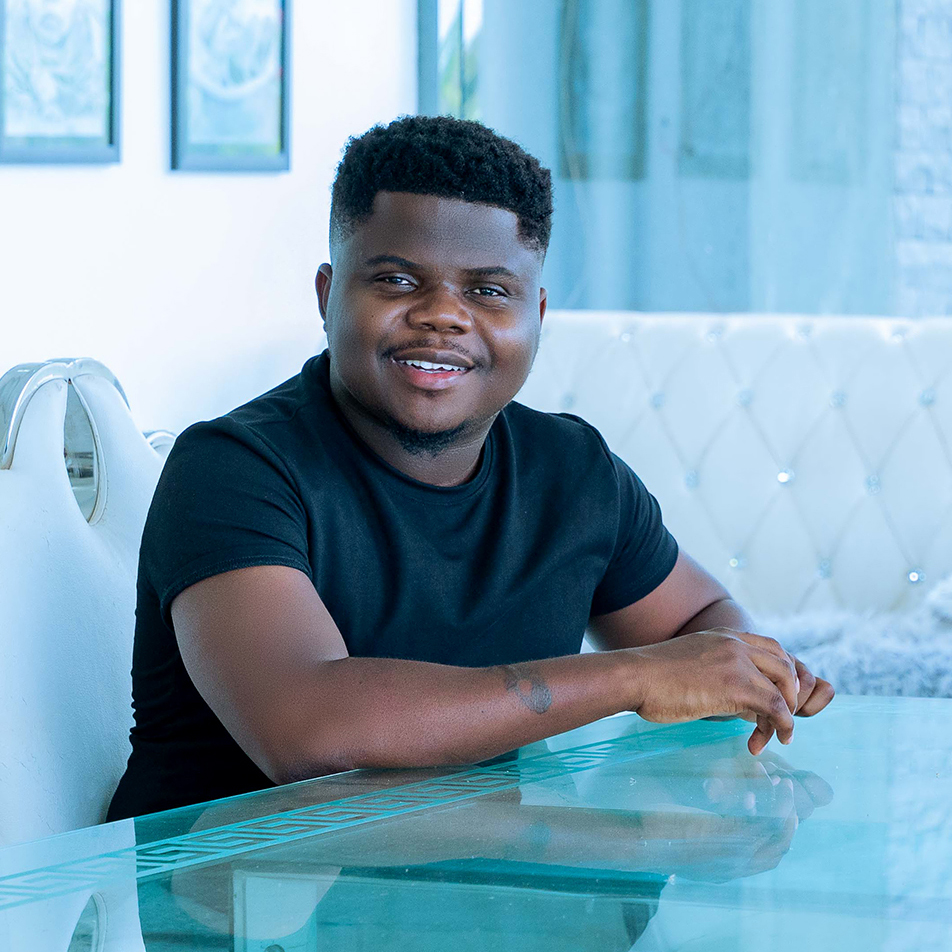
- Wode Maya in 2023
- Born: 3 March 1994 (age 32); Ahekofi, Ghana
- Education: Shenyang Aerospace University
- Occupation: YouTuber
- Spouse: Miss Trudy

YouTube information
- Channel: Wode Maya
- Years active: 2013–present
- Subscribers: 1.95 million
- Views: 300 million
- Last updated: 21 October 2025
- Website: wodemaya.me

Berthold Kobby Winkler Ackon (born March 3, 1994), popularly known as Wode Maya, is a Ghanaian YouTube personality, vlogger, digital media influencer, and aeronautical engineer. His name Wode Maya (Wǒ de Mà yà) translates as "Oh my God" in the Chinese language. In 2017, he took a video in a bus where seats were empty beside him and other passengers stood due to his skin colour and the video went viral. He is acclaimed to be one of the top and most Influential YouTubers in Africa.

== Early life and education ==
Wode Maya is from Ahekofi, Kofikrom, a town in the Western region of Ghana. He attended the Beijing Language and Culture University (BLCU).

== Career ==
He was still a student when he started vlogging in China about his experiences and later quit his job as an aeronautical engineer. His moniker Wode Maya comes from the Mandarin expression wǒ de mā ya (我的妈呀, lit. "Oh, my mom!"), which is an interjection that roughly equates to English "Oh my god!" In December 2021, he started his own real estate company and said it will be known as "CHARLIEMAG Estate" located in East Legon. He was one of six prominent YouTubers from around the world invited to cover the annual conference of the World Economic Forum in 2023. He was also invited to cover the 2023 Munich Security Conference.

== Recognition ==
=== Diplomatic Passport ===
On September 17, 2025, Wode Maya and four other distinguished Ghanaians received diplomatic passports from Ghana's Minister of Foreign Affairs, Samuel Okudzeto Ablakwa, in recognition of their contributions to promoting Ghana and Africa's image globally.

== Personal life ==
Wode Maya is married to Miss Trudy, a Kenyan YouTuber.

== Philanthropy ==
Wode Maya donated roughly $10,000 for a dumpsite to be transformed into a park after being inspired by a man in Kwahu. In 2021, he helped raise $10,000 to cater to the educational needs of one-hundred children. He claimed it was more than a donation and called on others to take up such deeds.

== Accolades ==
Wode Maya won Online Creator of the Year at the 2022 Entertainment Achievement Awards.
