= Pan-African Payment and Settlement System =

International payment system

Logo of the Pan-African Payment and Settlement System

The Pan-African Payment and Settlement System (PAPSS) is a Pan-African real-time gross settlement (RTGS) infrastructure for cross-border payments in distinct local currencies. It was publicly launched on January 13, 2022 by the African Union (AU) and the African Export-Import Bank (Afreximbank) to compliment trading under the African Continental Free Trade Area (AfCFTA) with further rollout in the Caribbean region.

== History ==
PAPSS was first mentioned on the 7 July 2019 at the 12th Extraordinary Session of The African Union Assembly in Niamey, Niger to support the launch of the operational phase of AfCFTA. It started as a pilot project among the 6 countries in the West African Monetary Zone (WAMZ) before it became publicly available. In 2023 several nations of the Caribbean Community began to implement a pilot framework for using the Pan-African Payment and Settlement System to facilitate trade between the Caribbean and Africa. The move coincided with the Afreximbank agreeing to designate the Caribbean region as a diaspora-related sixth region of Africa and opened an office in the Caribbean island of Barbados. PAPSS is slated to be rolled out among Caribbean countries which have already signed the agreement with Afreximbank, and is slated to come on stream in Q4, 2024.

== How it works ==
Here is a simplified overview of how PAPSS works

1. A company issues a payment instrument to their local bank or payment service provider
2. The payment instruction is sent to PAPSS through the country's central bank and routes it to the beneficiary bank account
3. PAPSS performs all validation checks on payment instruction before it sends it forwards it to the beneficiary's central bank and eventually to the local bank account
4. PAPSS sends credit or debit settlement instruction to the Central Bank of the originator and the Central Bank of the beneficiary. The Central Banks settle the transaction in hard currency, using Afreximbank as the settlement agent.
5. Once the cross-border net settlement is complete, the beneficiary receives the funds in their local currency.

On a daily basis, PAPSS settles the balance of all of the transactions among individual African currencies, netting them out prior to midnight. Central Banks then resolve the remaining difference. The payments and settlement process starts again from net zero the next day.

== Central banks ==
These are the banks enrolled in PAPSS (November 2025)

- Bank of Ghana
- Central Bank of Nigeria
- Central Bank of Liberia
- Central Bank of the Republic of Guinea
- Bank of Sierra Leone
- Reserve Bank of Zimbabwe
- Central Bank of Djibouti
- Bank of Zambia
- Central Bank of Kenya
- Central Bank of The Gambia
- Central Bank of Tunisia
- Central Bank of Egypt
- Central Bank of the Comoros
- Reserve Bank of Malawi
- Bank Al-Maghrib
- Bank of Algeria
- National Bank of Rwanda
- Bank of the Republic of Burundi

== See also ==
- Cross-Border Inter-Bank Payments System (CIPS)
- Indian Financial System Code (IFSC)
- Fedwire
- Mir (payment system)
- Structured Financial Messaging System (SFMS)
- Society for Worldwide Interbank Financial Telecommunications (Swift)
  - SWIFT ban against Russian banks
- Real-time gross settlement
