= Patricia Poku-Diaby =

Ghanaian businesswoman

- Born: Ghana
- Occupation: Cocoa merchant
- Years active: 2006–current
- Known for: Plot Enterprise

Patricia Poku-Diaby is a Ghanaian businesswoman, cocoa merchant and the CEO of Plot Enterprise Ghana Limited. In 2015, she was named the eighth richest person in Ghana and the richest woman in Ghana, with a net worth of $720 million.

She is the founder and CEO of Plot Enterprise Group, a cocoa processing company in Ghana.

== Early life ==
Prior to when Patricia Poku-Diaby started Plot Enterprise Group, she was involved in her family’s business (trading and transportation) before she set up the Plot Enterprise Group in Ivory Coast, from her Ghanaian pioneering company.

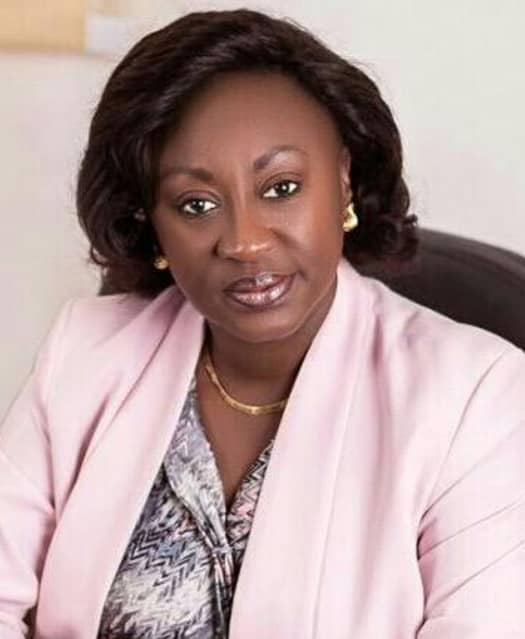

== Award and recognitions ==
In 2015, Patricia Poku-Diaby was listed as the eighth richest Ghanaian among 80 Ghanaian businessmen and entrepreneurs with a net worth of $720 million in a list compiled by Goodman AMC, a management and consultancy firm, and ‘The Ghana Wealth Report.'
