= Agenda 2063 =

Initiatives proposed by the African Union

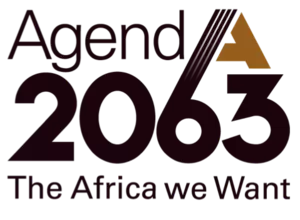
Logo

Agenda 2063 is a set of initiatives proposed and currently under implementation by the African Union. It was adopted on 31 January 2015 at the 24th Ordinary Assembly of the Heads of State and Governments of the African Union in Addis Ababa. Ethiopia. The call for such an agenda was first made by the 21st Ordinary Assembly on 26 May 2013, 50 years after the foundation of the Organisation of African Unity, as a plan for the next 50 years. The stated goals of the Agenda are economic development (including the eradication of poverty within one generation), political integration (in particular through the establishment of a federal or confederate United Africa), improvements in democracy and justice, establishment of security and peace on the entire African continent, strengthening of cultural identity through an "African renaissance" and pan-African ideals, gender equality, and political independence from foreign powers.

The First Continental Report on the Implementation of Agenda 2063 was presented by President Alassane Ouattara of Ivory Coast on 10th February, 2020, marking the beginning of a biennial reporting cycle. It measures progress against a set of goals defined for the first Ten-Year Implementation Plan and was launched together with an interactive online dashboard showing progress in individual areas of the Agenda as well as geographical regions.

== Flagship projects ==
The Agenda includes 15 flagship projects, which have been identified as being key to enabling and accelerating progress in all areas of development. These are:

1. A high-speed train network connecting all African capitals and commercial centres
2. The formulation of a strategy for transforming the African economy from a supplier of raw materials to one that actively uses its own resources
3. The establishment of the African Continental Free Trade Area
4. The introduction of the African Union Passport, and removal of all visa requirements for its holders within Africa.
5. Ending all wars, civil conflicts, gender-based violence, and violent conflicts by 2020 (later changed to 2030)
6. The construction of a third Inga Dam
7. The establishment of the Single African Air-Transport Market
8. The establishment of an Annual African Economic Forum
9. The establishment of a set of financial institutions, envisaged as an African Investment Bank, a Pan-African Stock Exchange, an African Monetary Fund, and an African Central Bank
10. A pan-African digital data network
11. The development of a common African strategy for the use of outer-space technology
12. The establishment of an African open, digital, distance-learning university
13. Cooperation on cyber security
14. The foundation of a Great African Museum, preserving African cultural heritage and promoting pan-Africanism
15. The compilation of an Encyclopaedia Africana as an authoritative resource on the authentic history of Africa and African life.

=== Implementation ===
The African Continental Free Trade Area (ACFTA) was established by an agreement adopted in March 2018 and officially commenced January 1st, 2021. The African Investment Bank and African Monetary Fund are nominally established, with headquarters to be built in Tripoli, Libya and Yaoundé, Cameroon, respectively. Egypt is set to host the African Space Agency. The Pan African Virtual and E-University (PAVEU) has been created as the digital arm of the Pan-African University and is offering an initial set of three courses.

Many of the projects are held back by lack of funding, such as the high-speed train network, the space agency, and the Inga Dam.

== See also ==
- Egypt Vision 2030
