= African Continental Free Trade Area =

Free trade area in Africa

- African Continental Free Trade Area logo Status as of August, 2024 Ratifying parties Signed March 2018, not ratified Signed July 2018 or later, not ratified
- Type: Free-trade area
- Signed: March 21, 2018
- Location: Kigali, Rwanda
- Effective: May 30, 2019; 7 years ago
- Condition: Ratification by 22 states
- Original signatories: 44 states: Algeria; Angola; Burkina Faso; Cabo Verde; Cameroon; Central African Republic; Chad; Comoros; Côte d'Ivoire; Democratic Republic of Congo; Djibouti; Egypt; Equatorial Guinea; Eswatini; Ethiopia; Gabon; Gambia; Ghana; Guinea; Kenya; Liberia; Libya; Madagascar; Malawi; Mali; Mauritania; Mauritius; Morocco; Mozambique; Niger; Republic of Congo; Rwanda; Sahrawi Republic; São Tomé and Príncipe; Senegal; Seychelles; Somalia; South Sudan; Sudan; Tanzania; Togo; Tunisia; Uganda; Zimbabwe
- Signatories: 10 additional states: Benin; Botswana; Burundi; Guinea-Bissau; Lesotho; Namibia; Nigeria; Sierra Leone; South Africa; Zambia
- Parties: 49 states: Algeria; Angola; Botswana; Burkina Faso; Burundi; Cabo Verde; Cameroon; Central African Republic; Chad; Comoros; Côte d'Ivoire; Democratic Republic of Congo; Djibouti; Egypt; Equatorial Guinea; Eswatini; Ethiopia; Gabon; Gambia; Ghana (May 10, 2018); Guinea; Guinea-Bissau; Kenya (May 10, 2018); Lesotho (November 2, 2020); Liberia; Madagascar; Malawi; Mali; Mauritania; Mauritius; Morocco; Mozambique; Namibia; Nigeria; Niger; Republic of the Congo; Rwanda; Sahrawi Republic; São Tomé and Príncipe; Senegal; Seychelles; Sierra Leone; South Africa; Tanzania (17 January 2022); Togo (December 6, 2018); Tunisia (November 2, 2020); Uganda (November 29, 2018); Zambia; Zimbabwe
- Depositary: African Union Commission
- Languages: Arabic, English, French, Portuguese, Spanish, Swahili

The African Continental Free Trade Area (AfCFTA) is a free trade area encompassing most of Africa. It was established in 2018 by the African Continental Free Trade Agreement, which has 43 parties and another 11 signatories, making it the largest free-trade area by number of member states, after the World Trade Organization, and the largest in population and geographic size, spanning 1.3 billion people across the world's second largest continent.

The agreement founding AfCFTA was brokered by the African Union (AU) and signed by 44 of its 55 member states in Kigali, Rwanda on March 21, 2018. The proposal was set to come into force 30 days after ratification by 22 of the signatory states. On April 29, 2019, the Sahrawi Republic made the 22nd deposit of instruments of ratification, bringing the agreement into force on May 30; it entered its operational phase following a summit on July 7, 2019, and officially commenced January 1, 2021. AfCFTA's negotiations and implementation are overseen by a permanent secretariat based in Accra, Ghana.

Under the agreement, AfCFTA members are committed to eliminating tariffs on most goods and services over a period of 5, 10, or 13 years, depending on the country's level of development or the nature of the products. General long-term objectives include creating a single, liberalised market; reducing barriers to capital and labor to facilitate investment; developing regional infrastructure; and establishing a continental customs union. The overall aims of AfCFTA are to increase socioeconomic development, reduce poverty, and make Africa more competitive in the global economy.

On January 13, 2022, the AfCFTA took a major step towards its objective with the establishment of the Pan-African Payment and Settlement System (PAPSS), which allows payments among companies operating in Africa (and later by extension the Caribbean) to be done in any local currency.

In April 2024, the African Union announced that the AfCFTA entered into the operational phase of the agreement. The operational phase, which effectively puts the agreement into force, is characterized by the following actions:

- Establishment of the rules of origin, which will govern the conditions under which a product or service can be traded duty free;
- Tariff concessions, 90% tariff liberalisation;
- Online mechanism, allows members to report non-tariff barriers;
- Pan-African payment and settlement system, allows certainty of payments and will instill confidence in the system
- African Trade Observatory, a portal to address hindrances to trade, will be provided by AU member states.

== History ==
=== Background ===
In 1963, the Organization of African Unity was founded by the independent states of Africa. The OAU aimed to promote cooperation between African states. In 1980 it adopted the Lagos Plan of Action. The plan suggested Africa should minimize its reliance upon the West by promoting intra-African trade. This began as the creation of a number of regional cooperation organizations in the different regions of Africa, such as the Southern African Development Coordination Conference. Eventually this led to the Abuja Treaty in 1991, which created the African Economic Community, an organization that promoted the development of free trade areas, customs unions, an African Central Bank, and an African common currency union.

In 2002, the OAU was succeeded by the African Union (AU), which had as one of its goals to accelerate the "economic integration of the continent". A second goal was to "coordinate and harmonize the policies between the existing and future Regional Economic Communities for the gradual attainment of the objectives of the Union."

=== Negotiations ===
At the 2012 African Union summit in Addis Ababa, leaders agreed to create a new Continental Free Trade Area by 2017. At the 2015 AU summit in Johannesburg, the summit agreed to commence negotiations. This began a series of ten negotiating sessions which took place over the next three years.

The first negotiation forum was held in February 2016 and held eight meetings until the Summit in March 2018 in Kigali. From February 2017 on the technical working groups held four meetings, where technical issues were discussed and implemented in the draft. On March 8–9, 2018 the African Union Ministers of Trade approved the draft.

=== 2018 Kigali Summit ===
In March 2018, at the 10th Extraordinary Session of the African Union on AfCFTA, three separate agreements were signed: the African Continental Free Trade Agreement, the Kigali Declaration; and the Protocol on Free Movement of Persons. The Protocol on Free Movement of Persons seeks to establish a visa-free zone within the AfCFTA countries, and support the creation of the African Union Passport. At the summit in Kigali on March 21, 2018, 44 countries signed the AfCFTA, 47 signed the Kigali Declaration, and 30 signed the Protocol on Free Movement of People. While a success, there were two notable holdouts: Nigeria and South Africa, the two largest economies in Africa.

One complicating factor in the negotiations was that Africa had already been divided into eight separate free trade areas and/or customs unions, each with different regulations. (Note: There are eight Regional Economic Communities recognised by the African Union, each established under a separate regional treaty.: Arab Maghreb Union (UMA); Common Market for Eastern and Southern Africa (COMESA); Community of Sahel-Saharan States (CEN-SAD); East African Community (EAC); Economic Community of Central African States (ECCAS); Economic Community of West African States (ECOWAS); Intergovernmental Authority on Development (IGAD); Southern African Development Community (SADC)) These regional bodies will continue to exist; the African Continental Free Trade Agreement initially seeks to reduce trade barriers between the different pillars of the African Economic Community, and eventually use these regional organizations as building blocks for the ultimate goal of an Africa-wide customs union.

Declarations signed at the 2018 Kigali summit
Country	Signed By	AfCFTA Consolidated Text (signature)	Kigali Declaration	Free Movement Protocol
Algeria	Prime Minister Ahmed Ouyahia	Yes	Yes	No
Angola	President João Lourenço	Yes	Yes	Yes
Central African Republic	President Faustin Archange Touadéra	Yes	Yes	Yes
Chad	President Idriss Déby	Yes	Yes	Yes
Comoros	President Azali Assoumani	Yes	Yes	Yes
Djibouti	President Ismaïl Omar Guelleh	Yes	Yes	No
Equatorial Guinea	Prime Minister Francisco Pascual Obama Asue	Yes	Yes	Yes
Eswatini	Prime Minister Barnabas Sibusiso Dlamini	Yes	Yes	No
Gabon	President Ali Bongo Ondimba	Yes	Yes	Yes
Gambia	President Adama Barrow	Yes	Yes	Yes
Ghana	President Nana Akufo-Addo	Yes	Yes	Yes
Ivory Coast	Vice President Daniel Kablan Duncan	Yes	No	No
Kenya	President Uhuru Kenyatta	Yes	Yes	Yes
Lesotho	Prime Minister Tom Thabane	No	Yes	Yes
Mauritania	President Mohamed Ould Abdel Aziz	Yes	Yes	Yes
Morocco	Prime Minister Saadeddine Othmani	Yes	No	No
Mozambique	President Filipe Nyusi	Yes	Yes	Yes
Niger	President Mahamadou Issoufou	Yes	Yes	Yes
Republic of the Congo	President Denis Sassou Nguesso	Yes	Yes	Yes
Rwanda	President Paul Kagame	Yes	Yes	Yes
Sahrawi Republic	President Brahim Ghali	Yes	Yes	No
Senegal	President Macky Sall	Yes	Yes	Yes
Seychelles	Vice President Vincent Meriton	Yes	Yes	No
South Africa	President Cyril Ramaphosa	No	Yes	No
Sudan	Prime Minister Abdalla Hamdok	Yes	Yes	Yes
Tanzania	Prime Minister Kassim Majaliwa	No	Yes	No
Uganda	President Yoweri Museveni	Yes	Yes	Yes
Zimbabwe	President Emmerson Mnangagwa	Yes	Yes	No

=== Drafting of further protocols ===
Negotiations continued in 2018 with Phase II, including policies of investment, competition and intellectual property rights. In January 2020, AU Assembly negotiations are envisaged to be concluded. A draft is expected for the January 2020 AU Assembly.

=== Expectations ===
In 2018, the United Nations Economic Commission for Africa estimated that AfCFTA would boost intra-African trade by 52 percent by 2022. A 2020 report by the World Bank anticipated that AfCFTA could lift 30 million Africans out of extreme poverty, boost the incomes of nearly 70 million people, and generate $450 billion in income by 2035.

== Institutions ==
The following institutions were established to facilitate the implementation of the free trade area. As a result of Phase II negotiations more committees may be established via protocols.

The AfCFTA Secretariat is responsible for coordinating the implementation of the agreement and is an autonomous body within the AU system. Though it has independent legal personality, it works closely with the AU Commission and receives its budget from the AU. The Council of Ministers responsible for trade was to decide on the location of the headquarter, structure, role and responsibilities. The Assembly of the African Union Heads of State and Government is the highest decision-making body. It is likely to meet during the AU Summits. The Council of Ministers Responsible for Trade provides strategic trade policy oversight and ensures effective implementation and enforcement of the AfCFTA Agreement.

Several committees have been established: for trade in goods, trade in services, on rules of origin, trade remedies, non-tariff barriers, technical barriers to trade and on sanitary and phytosanitary measures. Dispute resolution mechanisms and procedures are still being negotiated, but will presumably include designation of a dispute resolution body. The Committee of Senior Trade Officials implements the Council's decisions. The Committee is responsible for the development of programs and action plans for the implementation of the AfCFTA Agreement.

== Implementation ==
The AfCFTA is set to be implemented in phases, and some of the future phases are still under negotiation. Phase I covers trade in goods and trade in services. Phase II covers intellectual property rights, investment and competition policy. Phase III covers e-commerce.

At the 2018 Kigali summit, areas of agreement were found on trade protocols, dispute settlement procedures, customs cooperation, trade facilitation, and rules of origin. There was also agreement to reduce tariffs on 90% of all goods. Each nation is permitted to exclude 3% of goods from this agreement. This was part of Phase I of the agreement, which covers goods and services liberalization. Some Phase I issues that remain to be negotiated include the schedule of tariff concessions and other specific commitments.

The 12th Extraordinary Session of the African Union on AfCFTA, called to launch the new agreement into its operational phase, was hosted in Niamey on July 7, 2019. At its launch, five operational instruments that will govern the AfCFTA were activated: "the rules of origin; the online negotiating forum; the monitoring and elimination of non-tariff barriers; a digital payment system; and the African Trade Observatory."

Phase II and III negotiations are expected to be initiated by all AU member countries and held in successive rounds. In February 2020, the AU Assembly of Heads of State and Government decided that Phase III would begin immediately following the conclusion of Phase II negotiations, which were initially scheduled to conclude in December 2020. However, this deadline was delayed due to the COVID-19 pandemic in Africa, and a new date (December 31, 2021) was set as the deadline for the conclusion of Phase II and III negotiations. The AfCFTA officially but largely symbolically launched on January 1, 2021.

== Membership ==
Among the 55 AU member states, 44 signed the African Continental Free Trade Agreement (consolidated text), 47 signed the Kigali Declaration and 30 signed the Protocol on Free Movement of People at the end of the 2018 Kigali Summit. Benin, Botswana, Eritrea, Guinea-Bissau, Nigeria, and Zambia were among the 11 countries that did not initially sign the agreement. After the 2018 Kigali summit, more signatures were added to the AfCFTA. At the 31st African Union Summit in Nouakchott on 1 July 2018, South Africa (the second largest economy of Africa), Sierra Leone, Namibia, Lesotho and Burundi joined the agreement. In February 2019, Guinea-Bissau, Zambia and Botswana also joined. Kenya and Ghana were the first nations to ratify the agreement, depositing their ratification on 10 May 2018.

Of the signatories, 22 needed to deposit the instrument of ratification of the agreement for it to come into effect, and this occurred on April 29, 2019 when both Sierra Leone and the Sahrawi Arab Democratic Republic deposited the agreement. As a result, the agreement came into force 30 days later on May 30, 2019.

President of Nigeria Muhammadu Buhari was particularly reluctant to join the AfCFTA, fearing it would hurt Nigerian entrepreneurship and local industries, and his decision not to was praised by some local groups including the Manufacturers Association of Nigeria and the Nigeria Labour Congress. The Nigerian government intended to consult further with local businesses in order to ensure private sector buy-in to the agreement, because a key concern was whether the agreement adequately prevented anti-competitive practices such as dumping. In July 2019, just months after being re-elected to a new term, Buhari agreed to join the agreement at the 12th extraordinary session of the assembly of the union on AfCFTA.

At the same meeting, Benin also committed to signing the agreement, leaving Eritrea as the only one of the 55 African Union Member States not to sign up to the deal. Formally, Eritrea was not part of the initial agreement due to an ongoing state of war, but the 2018 peace agreement between Ethiopia and Eritrea ended the conflict and ended the barrier to Eritrean participation in the free trade agreement.

As of May 2026, there are 54 signatories, of which 49 have deposited their instruments of ratification. Additionally, one country (Somalia) completed its domestic ratification, but had not yet deposited their ratification with the depository by May 2020. Eritrea is the only AU member state which had not signed the agreement by 2019.

=== List of signatories and parties to the agreement ===
Ratification Status of African Nations
Country	Signed	Date of Signing	Ratified	Date of Ratification	Deposited	Date of Deposit
Algeria	Yes	March 21, 2018	Yes	June 7, 2021	Yes	June 23, 2021
Angola	Yes	March 21, 2018	Yes	October 6, 2020	Yes	November 4, 2020
Benin	Yes	July 7, 2019	No		No	
Botswana	Yes	February 10, 2019	Yes		Yes	February 19, 2023
Burkina Faso	Yes	March 21, 2018	Yes	May 27, 2019	Yes	May 29, 2019
Burundi	Yes	July 2, 2018	Yes	June 17, 2021	Yes	August 26, 2021
Cameroon	Yes	March 21, 2018	Yes	January 31, 2020	Yes	December 1, 2020
Central African Republic	Yes	March 21, 2018	Yes	April 9, 2020	Yes	September 22, 2020
Cape Verde	Yes	March 21, 2018	Yes	November 13, 2020	Yes	February 5, 2022
Chad	Yes	March 21, 2018	Yes	June 29, 2018	Yes	July 2, 2018
Ivory Coast	Yes	March 21, 2018	Yes	November 13, 2018	Yes	November 23, 2018
Comoros	Yes	March 21, 2018	Yes		Yes	February 19, 2023
Republic of the Congo	Yes	March 21, 2018	Yes	February 7, 2019	Yes	February 10, 2019
Democratic Republic of the Congo	Yes	March 21, 2018	Yes	January 28, 2022	Yes	February 23, 2022
Djibouti	Yes	March 21, 2018	Yes	February 5, 2019	Yes	February 11, 2019
Egypt	Yes	March 21, 2018	Yes	February 27, 2019	Yes	April 8, 2019
Equatorial Guinea	Yes	March 21, 2018	Yes	June 28, 2019	Yes	July 2, 2019
Eritrea	No		No		No	
Eswatini	Yes	March 21, 2018	Yes	June 21, 2018	Yes	July 2, 2018
Ethiopia	Yes	March 21, 2018	Yes	March 23, 2019	Yes	April 10, 2019
Gabon	Yes	March 21, 2018	Yes	July 2, 2019	Yes	July 7, 2019
Gambia	Yes	March 21, 2018	Yes	April 11, 2019	Yes	April 16, 2019
Ghana	Yes	March 21, 2018	Yes	May 7, 2018	Yes	May 10, 2018
Guinea	Yes	March 21, 2018	Yes	July 31, 2018	Yes	October 16, 2018
Guinea-Bissau	Yes	February 8, 2019	Yes	August 31, 2022	Yes	August 31, 2022
Kenya	Yes	March 21, 2018	Yes	May 6, 2018	Yes	May 10, 2018
Lesotho	Yes	July 2, 2018	Yes	October 20, 2020	Yes	November 27, 2020
Liberia	Yes	March 21, 2018	Yes	September 4, 2024	Yes	October 8, 2024
Libya	Yes	March 21, 2018	No		No	
Madagascar	Yes	March 21, 2018	Yes	April 18, 2025	Yes	May 13, 2025
Malawi	Yes	March 21, 2018	Yes	November 1, 2020	Yes	January 15, 2021
Mali	Yes	March 21, 2018	Yes	January 11, 2019	Yes	February 1, 2019
Mauritania	Yes	March 21, 2018	Yes	January 31, 2019	Yes	February 11, 2019
Mauritius	Yes	March 21, 2018	Yes	September 30, 2019	Yes	October 7, 2019
Morocco	Yes	March 21, 2018	Yes	February 24, 2022	Yes	April 18, 2022
Mozambique	Yes	March 21, 2018	Yes	June 20, 2023	Yes	July 5, 2023
Namibia	Yes	July 2, 2018	Yes	January 25, 2019	Yes	February 1, 2019
Niger	Yes	March 21, 2018	Yes	May 28, 2018	Yes	June 19, 2018
Nigeria	Yes	July 7, 2019	Yes	December 3, 2020	Yes	December 5, 2020
Rwanda	Yes	March 21, 2018	Yes	May 25, 2018	Yes	May 26, 2018
Sahrawi Republic	Yes	March 21, 2018	Yes	April 27, 2019	Yes	April 30, 2019
São Tomé and Príncipe	Yes	March 21, 2018	Yes	May 28, 2019	Yes	June 27, 2019
Senegal	Yes	March 21, 2018	Yes	March 12, 2019	Yes	April 2, 2019
Seychelles	Yes	March 21, 2018	Yes	July 8, 2021	Yes	September 15, 2021
Sierra Leone	Yes	July 2, 2018	Yes	April 19, 2019	Yes	April 30, 2019
Somalia	Yes	March 21, 2018	Yes		No	
South Africa	Yes	July 2, 2018	Yes	January 31, 2019	Yes	February 10, 2019
South Sudan	Yes	March 21, 2018	No		No	
Sudan	Yes	March 21, 2018	No		No	
Tanzania	Yes	March 21, 2018	Yes	January 17, 2022	Yes	January 17, 2022
Togo	Yes	March 21, 2018	Yes	January 9, 2019	Yes	April 2, 2019
Tunisia	Yes	March 21, 2018	Yes	September 7, 2020	Yes	November 27, 2020
Uganda	Yes	March 21, 2018	Yes	November 20, 2018	Yes	February 9, 2019
Zambia	Yes	February 10, 2019	Yes	January 28, 2021	Yes	February 5, 2021
Zimbabwe	Yes	March 21, 2018	Yes	April 25, 2019	Yes	May 24, 2019

=== Other AU member states ===
Eritrea has not signed due to tensions with Ethiopia, but as of 2019, following the 2018 Eritrea–Ethiopia summit, the AU Commissioner for Trade and Industry expected that Eritrea would eventually sign the agreement.

=== Links with other regions ===
==== Caribbean Community (CARICOM) ====
Some editorial and political discourse has been made about the African diaspora and specifically the potential level of engagement which could be garnered between the African continent and the Caribbean region. Many Caribbean nations have sought to deepen ties with nations in the continent of Africa. Leading to the African Union-bloc referring to the Caribbean as the potential "Sixth Region" of the African Union under the protocol on the amendment to the Constitutive Act of 2003. Some Caribbean states have already moved to join Africa institutions including Barbados, Grenada, Guyana, and The Bahamas which have all become members of the African Export-Import Bank. And the Caribbean Development Bank has signed a cooperation strategic partnership agreement with the African Development Bank (AfDB). In 2022 the former President of Jamaica even made calls for Caribbean States to seek partnership with the AfCFTA agreement. At present Antigua and Barbuda, Barbados, Jamaica, Guyana, and Suriname are at various stages of establishing direct air flights with Africa to boost person-to-person links and boost trade, or tourism between both regions. Several Caribbean islands have also looked to open negotiations on easing passport visa restrictions between both regions.

The first inter-regional Africa-Caribbean Community (CARICOM) Summit took place in September 2021. In August 2023 the African Union's African Export–Import Bank officially launched its first Caribbean Community office in Barbados beginning the process of integrating willing Caribbean states as the 6th region of the African Union. The Government of Barbados donated the land in order to help complete the deal. In 2023 the CARICOM-bloc's central banks voted to choose the African PAPSS-system as the preferred method for clearing inter-regional transactions.

In August 2026, the President of Ghana, John Dramani Mahama, stated that one of his agenda items when he leads the African Union next year will be the inclusion of the Caribbean Community into the AfCFTA framework. To facilitate the move, a parliament-supported joint commission is to be assembled between both regions with the aim of legal and national standards harmonisation. The initiative may delve into the idea of also separating the Caribbean out of the 6th region known as "diaspora", and forming it as a special 7th region directly of the AU. Under the agreement it's been proposed that leaders of nations which have signed on to the arrangement will be allowed to sit-in and take part in African Union meetings as well.

== See also ==
- AfCFTA Dispute Settlement Mechanism
- ASEAN Free Trade Area
- Caribbean Community (CARICOM)
  - CARICOM Single Market and Economy
- Central European Free Trade Agreement
- Common Market for Eastern and Southern Africa
- Commonwealth of Independent States Free Trade Area
- Comprehensive and Progressive Agreement for Trans-Pacific Partnership
- Council of Arab Economic Unity
- Free trade agreement
- Free-trade area
- Free trade areas in Europe
- Market access
- Single African Air Transport Market
- Rules of Origin
- Tariffs
- Tourism in Africa
- Tripartite Free Trade Area
