= African Export–Import Bank =

Pan-African financial institution

African Export–Import Bank (Afreximbank)
- Type: Development finance institution
- Industry: Financial services
- Founded: 1993; 33 years ago
- Headquarters: 72B, El Maahad El-Eshteraky Street, Heliopolis, Cairo, Egypt
- Area served: Africa and the Caribbean
- Key people: George Elombi (president and chairman of board of directors); Denys Denya (senior executive vice-president, Finance, Administration and Banking Services); Kanayo Awani (executive vice-president, Intra-African Trade and Export Development); Haytham El Maayergi (executive vice-president, Global Trade Bank)
- Net income: US$ 973.5 million (2024)
- Total assets: US$ 40.1 billion (2024)
- Total equity: US$ 7.2 billion (2024)
- Capital ratio: 24 percent (2024)
- Rating: Moody's: Baa2/P-2 (stable) Fitch: BBB− /F3 Japan Credit Rating: (A−, stable) China Chengxin Credit Rating Group: (AAA) Global Credit Rating: A
- Website: www.afreximbank.com

African Export–Import Bank, also referred to as Afreximbank or Banque Africaine d’Import-Export, is a pan-African supranational multilateral financial institution created in 1993 under the auspices of the African Development Bank. It was officially launched at the first general meeting of the shareholders in Abuja, Nigeria, in October 1993. It is headquartered in Cairo, Egypt.

Afreximbank is a financial provider to African governments and private businesses in support of intra-African and Caribbean trade.

== History ==
Afreximbank, established in 1993, serves as Africa's export-import bank, dedicated to promoting and financing intra- and extra-African trade. The bank's foundation was formalized during its constituent general assembly on May 8, 1993, held at the African Development Bank (AfDB) headquarters in Abidjan. Participating states signed the Agreement establishing the bank, while those wishing to become shareholders endorsed the bank's charter.

The agreement grants Afreximbank the status of an international organization with full juridical personality under the laws of its participating states. It also provides the bank with specific immunities, exemptions, privileges, and concessions within these territories to facilitate its operations.

In October 1993, Afreximbank was officially launched during its inaugural General Meeting of Shareholders in Abuja, where Christopher Edordu was appointed its first President. Operations commenced in 1994, marked by the bank's participation in a $150 million syndicated loan to Ghana’s Cocoa Board, contributing $6.5 million to the transaction.

Since inception, Afreximbank has championed the process of economic integration in Africa by directly financing the growth of intra-African trade, investing in trade facilitation, expanding trade-enabling infrastructure, and developing technological ecosystems to dismantle long-standing barriers to intra-African trade and investments.

By the end of 2024, Afreximbank's total assets and guarantees reached $40.1 billion, with shareholder funds amounting to $7.2 billion. Between 2016 and 2022, the bank disbursed over $86 billion to support African economies. In addition, from 2020 to 2022, it provided approximately $50 billion on a revolving basis to help African nations manage the economic impact of the COVID-19 pandemic and the Ukraine crisis, and drive economic recovery across the continent.

=== Afreximbank charter ===
The Afreximbank charter was adopted in Abuja, Nigeria, in October 1993, and its provisions regulate the bank as a corporate body. The bank works with African and non-African export credit agencies, development finance institutions, commercial banks, and other multilateral institutions to support trade finance activities in Africa.

Afreximbank began with an authorised share capital of US$750 million in 1993, but the authorized share capital of the bank was increased to US$5 billion on December 8, 2012. On October 28, 2021, Afreximbank announced that it had embarked on a US$6.5 billion General Capital Increase (of which US$2.6 billion would be paid-in) to expand its capacity to deliver on its core mandate and diversify its range of services.

== Shareholding structure ==
As of December 2023, the bank's shareholders, totalling 164, were divided into four categories:

- Class "A" Shareholders - African governments, African continental, regional, and sub-regional institutions, and economic zones.
- Class "B" Shareholders - African Private Investors and African National financial institutions.
- Class "C" Shareholders - international financial institutions and economic organizations, non-regional financial institutions, and non-African Private Investors.
- Class "D" Shareholders - created in December 2012 and open to subscription by any investor, African or non-African.

== Governance ==
The General Meeting of Shareholders is Afreximbank's highest decision-making body. The General Meeting of shareholders, through the respective share classes, elects the members of the bank's board of directors and appoints the president of the bank upon the recommendation of the board of directors.

In line with the provisions of the charter, the board of directors is responsible for the general conduct of the business of Afreximbank. The day-to-day business of the bank is delegated to the president, who is also the chairman of the board of directors. Under the charter, the president is the chief executive and legal representative of the bank.

Dr George Elombi, a Cameroonian national, is the fourth president and chairman of the board of directors of Afreximbank, having been appointed to that position at the Annual General Meeting of Shareholders held on 28 June 2025, for a five-year term. He took his oath of office on 25 October 2025. He succeeded Professor Benedict Okey Oramah, who led the bank as president and chairman of the board of directors from 2015 to 2025.

Oramah was preceded in office by Jean-Louis Ekra, who served from 2005 to 2015 and who, in turn, succeeded Christopher Edordu, the pioneer president, who was in office from 1993 to 2005.

Presidents of the African Export–Import Bank - Afreximbank
Name	Dates	Nationality
Christopher Edordu	1993–2003	Nigeria
Jean-Louis Ekra	2005–2015	Ivory Coast
Benedict Okey Oramah	2015–2025	Nigeria
George Elombi	2025–present	Cameroon

== Membership ==
As of December 2024, Afreximbank has 53 participating African member states and 12 participating Caribbean states ratified under the Partnership Agreement with the Caribbean Community (CARICOM).

=== African member states ===
- Algeria
- Angola
- Benin
- Botswana
- Burkina Faso
- Burundi
- Cameroon
- Cape Verde
- Central African Republic
- Chad
- Comoros
- Ivory Coast
- DR Congo
- Djibouti
- Egypt
- Equatorial Guinea
- Eritrea
- Eswatini
- Ethiopia
- Gabon
- Gambia
- Ghana
- Guinea
- Guinea-Bissau
- Kenya
- Lesotho
- Liberia
- Libya
- Madagascar
- Malawi
- Mali
- Mauritania
- Mauritius
- Morocco
- Mozambique
- Namibia
- Niger
- Nigeria
- Congo
- Rwanda
- São Tomé and Príncipe
- Senegal
- Seychelles
- Sierra Leone
- Somalia
- South Africa
- South Sudan
- Sudan
- Tanzania
- Togo
- Tunisia
- Uganda
- Zambia
- Zimbabwe

=== CARICOM member states ===
- Antigua and Barbuda
- Bahamas
- Barbados
- Dominica
- Guyana
- Haiti
- Jamaica
- Saint Kitts and Nevis
- Saint Lucia
- Saint Vincent and the Grenadines
- Suriname

=== Regional offices ===
Afreximbank has six regional offices, as follows:

Region	Headquarters
Central Africa	(Cameroon) Yaoundé
East Africa	(Uganda) Kampala
North Africa	(Egypt) Cairo
Southern Africa	(Zimbabwe) Harare
West Africa	(Nigeria) Abuja
Caribbean	(Barbados) Bridgetown

== Afreximbank annual meetings ==
The 23rd Annual General Meeting of the bank's shareholders was held from July 18 to 24, 2016 in the Seychelles. This meeting was the first chaired by President Dr. Benedict Oramah. The 30th Annual General Meeting was held in Accra, Ghana, from June 18 to 21, 2023.

In 2024, Afreximbank hosted its 31st Annual Meeting alongside the third edition of the AfriCaribbean Trade and Investment Forum (ACTIF) in Nassau, the Bahamas.

== Group, subsidiaries and initiatives ==
Afreximbank operates as a group entity consisting of the main bank and two subsidiaries: the Fund for Export Development in Africa (FEDA), an impact investment subsidiary, and AfrexInsure, an insurance management subsidiary. The bank also participates in several continent-wide initiatives related to trade facilitation and economic development.

=== Fund for Export Development in Africa ===
The Fund for Export Development in Africa (FEDA) is Afreximbank's impact investment subsidiary, established with an initial capital contribution of US$100 million from the parent bank. FEDA is headquartered in Kigali, Rwanda.

=== AfrexInsure ===
AfrexInsure is a wholly owned subsidiary specializing in insurance management services for trade and investment activities across Africa. The company is based in Mauritius, and was launched in 2023 during Afreximbank's annual meeting in Accra.

=== MANSA ===
MANSA is a collaborative customer due diligence (CDD) and know your customer (KYC) information repository platform developed in partnership with the African Development Bank, African Central Banks, and other financial institutions. The platform focuses on African financial institutions and corporations, enabling global institutions to access due diligence profiles and conduct customer verification for African entities, including financial institutions, corporations, and small-to-medium enterprises.

=== Pan-African Payment and Settlement System ===
In partnership with the African Union, Afreximbank helped establish Pan-African Payment and Settlement System (PAPSS), a real-time gross settlement system designed to facilitate cross-border payments using local African currencies rather than international reserve currencies.

=== African Medical Centre of Excellence ===
Afreximbank began construction of the African Medical Centre of Excellence (AMCE) in Abuja, Nigeria. The facility is intended to provide healthcare services across different economic segments of the African population.

=== Intra-African Trade Fair ===
The Intra-African Trade Fair (IATF) is a biennial trade exhibition organized by Afreximbank in collaboration with the African Union Commission and the African Continental Free Trade Area Secretariat. The event serves as a platform for connecting businesses, investors, and governments across Africa, featuring exhibitions, conferences, and networking opportunities to promote intra-African trade and support implementation of the AfCFTA.

=== Africa Quality Assurance Centre ===
The Africa Quality Assurance Centre (AQAC) initiative establishes facilities to provide testing, inspection, and certification services for African products to meet international quality standards. The first AQAC facility was launched in Nigeria, focusing initially on agricultural products. The centers are intended to address quality compliance challenges faced by African exporters in accessing global markets.

=== Creative Africa Nexus ===
CANEX is Afreximbank's initiative supporting Africa's creative and cultural industries. The program connects creative professionals, entrepreneurs, investors, and policymakers across sectors including fashion, film, music, visual arts, publishing, and digital media. CANEX provides financing, capacity development, and market access support for participants in the creative economy sector.

== See also ==
- African Development Bank
- Africa Energy Bank
- Caribbean Development Bank
- Trade and Development Bank
- East African Development Bank
- West African Development Bank
- Development Bank of Southern Africa
- Afrexim Bank House, Kampala
- Spiro
