= Single South American currency =

The single South American currency was a hypothetical united currency for South America. It was proposed by the leaders of several countries, and would have been issued by the Bank of the South to the members of the Union of South American Nations.

A name for the currency was not defined, but several have been proposed, such as Condor, American Peso, Latino, Pacha, Sucre, Colombo, Peso-Real, Sur, among others.

The Bank of the South establishes monetary policy and finance development projects; one of the objectives of the monetary union is the establishment of a single currency in South America.

== See also ==
- Specific proposals for South American currencies
  - Gaucho
  - SUCRE
- Currency unions (real or proposed) outside South America
  - Afro
  - Amero
  - Caribbean guilder
  - CFA franc
  - CFP franc
  - Eastern Caribbean dollar
  - Eco
  - Euro
  - Khaleeji
  - Terra
