= List of proposed currencies =

This is a list of proposed currencies. Currencies are listed by their latest significant proposal.

== 19th century ==
- Perun, planned to be introduced by Petar II Petrović-Njegoš in Montenegro
- Romanat

== 20th century ==
- ANCAP
- Bancor, an international currency proposed by John Maynard Keynes at the Bretton Woods Conference
- Gaucho, between Argentina and Brazil
- Metica, in Mozambique
- Terra

== 2000s ==
- Amero, in a currency union for North America consisting of the United States, Canada, and Mexico
- CARICOM currency, for Caribbean states (except the Bahamas)
- Khaleeji, for the Gulf Cooperation Council (Bahrain, Kuwait, Oman, Qatar, Saudi Arabia, United Arab Emirates)
- SUCRE, as part of the Bolivarian Alternative for the Americas

== Current proposals ==
- Afro, proposed currency for the African Union to be issued by the African Central Bank, expected to be introduced in the 2020s
- Argentum, a replacement for the Argentine peso proposed due to hyperinflation.
- Asian Currency Unit, proposed for the ASEAN +3 or the East Asian Community (including the ASEAN member-states, China, South Korea, and Japan)
- East African shilling, for the East African Community (Burundi, Kenya, Rwanda, Tanzania, Uganda).
- Eco, for the West African Monetary Zone (Gambia, Ghana, Guinea, Nigeria, Sierra Leone, possibly Liberia), planned to be introduced in 2027 and merged with the CFA franc and eventually the Afro.
- Toman, a replacement for the Iranian rial proposed by the Central Bank of Iran due to hyperinflation.
