= African Monetary Union =

Proposed economic and monetary union

The African Monetary Union (AMU) is the proposed creation of an economic and monetary union for the countries of the African Union, administered by the African Central Bank. Such a union would call for the creation of a new unified currency, similar to the euro; the hypothetical currency is sometimes referred to as the afro or afriq.

The Abuja Treaty, an international agreement signed on June 3, 1991, in Abuja, Nigeria, created the African Economic Community, and called for an African Central Bank to follow by 2028. As of 2019, the plan is to establish an African Economic Community with a single currency by 2023.

== Regional currency unions ==
There are two existing regional currency unions in Africa, using the West African CFA franc, and the Central African CFA franc, respectively. Additionally, the Common Monetary Area links several countries in Southern Africa based on the South African rand.

The African Union's plans for further integration encourage the development of more such regional unions as an intermediate step to full monetary union. One proposed union is the eco, a proposed currency for members of the Economic Community of West African States (ECOWAS).

== AFRO prototype art project ==
In 2002, Mansour Ciss and Baruch Gottlieb created a "prototype" currency, called the AFRO, which they presented at the Dakar Biennale of Contemporary African Art on May 10. It was designed by Dr. Professor Boamh. The project was a response to the perceived lack of independence created by use of the CFA franc. Notes and coins of the imaginary currency were produced, and given away or sold to the people of Dakar and Senegal to encourage them "to reflect on the meaning (value) of money and the future of their own local currency".

== Membership ==
In 2015, Anthony Maruping stated that Kenya, Uganda, Tanzania, Rwanda and Burundi were committed to join a common currency in the next ten years. So far only three of the 53 member states of the African Union in 2009 have committed to using the currency (in 2026, the African Union has 55 members).

Egypt, Eswatini, and Lesotho have logged reservations over the precise date of monetary union and have requested a two to three-year delay.

Seychelles may not join as a result of economic fears and may, along with Cape Verde, attempt to join the euro These countries might join at a later date, while the official currency of Mayotte is the euro already.

== African Central Bank ==
The African Central Bank (ACB) is one of the three financial institutions of the African Union. It will, over time, take over the responsibilities of the African Monetary Fund.

The creation of the ACB, to be completed by 2028, was first agreed upon in the 1991 Abuja Treaty. The 1999 Sirte Declaration called for a speeding up of this process, with creation by 2020.

When it is fully implemented via Pan-African Parliament legislation, the ACB will be the sole issuer of the African single currency (African Monetary Union/Afro), will become the banker of African Governments, will be the banker to Africa's private and public banking institutions, will regulate and supervise the African banking industry, and will set the official interest and exchange rates in conjunction with the African Government's administration.

The current timeline established by the Abuja Treaty calls for a single African currency to be instituted by the African Central Bank by 2028. Although some countries have reservations about full economic and monetary union, several regional monetary unions already exist, and others are planned.

== Signatories ==
Signatories to the treaty were all members of the Organisation of African Unity (predecessor of the AU) at the time (Eritrea, South Africa, South Sudan and Morocco have since joined):

Country	Official currency	Informal currency	Note
Algeria	DZD		
Angola	AOA		
Benin	XOF		
Botswana	BWP		
Burkina Faso	XOF		
Burundi	BIF		
Cameroon	XAF		
Cape Verde	CVE	EUR	Once mooted joining the euro in the long term; lodged a formal reservation over the start date, etc.
Central African Republic	XAF		
Chad	XAF		
The Comoros	KMF	EUR	
Republic of Congo	XAF		
Côte d'Ivoire	XOF		
DRC	CDF	USD	
Djibouti	DJF		
Egypt	EGP		Lodged a formal reservation over the start date, etc.
Eswatini	SWL; ZAR(pegged at parity 1:1)		Lodged a formal reservation over the start date, etc.
Ethiopia	ETB		
Equatorial Guinea	XAF		
Gabon	XAF		
The Gambia	GMD		Planning to launch the Eco at an earlier date.
Ghana	GHS		Planning to launch the Eco at an earlier date.
Guinea	GNF		Planning to launch the Eco at an earlier date.
Guinea Bissau	XOF		
Kenya	KES		
Lesotho	LSL; ZAR(pegged at parity 1:1)		Lodged a formal reservation over the start date, etc.
Liberia	LRD	USD	Planning to launch the Eco at an earlier date.
Libya	LYD		
Madagascar	MGA		
Malawi	MWK		
Mali	XOF		
Mauritania	MRO		
Mauritius	MUR		
Morocco	MAD		
Mozambique	MZN		
Namibia	NAD; ZAR(pegged at parity 1:1)		
Niger	XOF		
Nigeria	NGN		Planning to launch the Eco at an earlier date.
Rwanda	RWF		
Sahrawi Arab Democratic Republic	EHP	EUR	
São Tomé and Príncipe	STN		
Senegal	XOF		
Seychelles	SCR		Once mooted joining the euro in the long term; lodged a formal reservation over the start date, etc.
Sierra Leone	SLL	USD	Planning to launch the Eco at an earlier date.
Somalia	SOS		
South Africa	ZAR		
Sudan	SDG		
Tanzania	TZS		
Togo	XOF		
Tunisia	TND		
Uganda	UGX		
Zambia	ZMK		
Zimbabwe	ZWG (see note)		As of 29 January 2014 the South African rand, Botswana pula, pound sterling, Indian rupee, euro, Japanese yen, Australian dollar, United States dollar and Chinese yuan are all legal tender in Zimbabwe.

== See also ==
- Economy of Africa
- Central banks and currencies of Africa
- List of countries by leading trade partners
- International status and usage of the euro
- International use of the U.S. dollar
- Internationalization of the renminbi
- Special drawing rights
- Amero, theoretical North American currency union
- Canadian dollar
- Euro
- United States dollar
- List of African countries by GDP growth
- List of African countries by GDP (nominal)
- List of African countries by GDP (PPP)
- List of countries by credit rating
- List of countries by future gross government debt
- List of countries by public debt
- List of countries by tax revenue as percentage of GDP
- List of trade blocs
- African Union
- Arab League
- European Union
- Monetary union
- Eastern Caribbean dollar, monetary union by several Eastern Caribbean nations
- Eco, proposed Western Africa currency
- Khaleeji (currency), another attempt at a common currency, within the Arab community
- Sucre (currency), A commodity based currency system of Lat-Am & Caribe
