= African Investment Bank =

Financial institution

The African Investment Bank (AIB) is one of three financial institutions of the African Union (AU), along with the African Monetary Fund and the African Central Bank. It is slated to be headquartered in Tripoli, Libya. The Protocol establishing the AIB has not yet entered into force, as it awaits the required number of ratifications.

== Background ==
The 2000 Lomé Summit adopted the Constitutive Act of the African Union, which outlined the objectives, principles, and organs of the AU. The act, signed by twenty-seven African countries, provided for the establishment of several institutions, including the Pan-African Parliament, the Court of Justice, the African Central Bank, the African Monetary Fund, and the African Investment Bank. In 2005, the AU held a meeting of independent experts in Addis Ababa, Ethiopia, to consider concept papers and draft protocols prepared by the African Union Commission (AUC) regarding the three institutions. The AU also determined the locations for the financial institutions: the African Central Bank in Nigeria, the African Investment Bank in Libya, and the African Monetary Fund in Central Africa.

== Status and Recent Developments ==
The Protocol on the African Investment Bank requires 15 ratifications from AU member states to officially enter into force. As of May 2019, only six countries had ratified the Protocol: Benin, Burkina Faso, Chad, Congo, Libya, and Togo. The slow pace of ratification is the primary obstacle to the bank's operational launch, with nine more ratifications needed to meet the threshold. The target for establishing the AIB under the AU's Agenda 2063 is 2025.

Despite the delay, Libya has made significant progress in preparing for the bank's establishment. In 2022, Prime Minister Abdul Hamid Dbeibah formed a founding committee, with Mustafa Al-Manea, an advisor to the Governor of the Central Bank of Libya, as its Chairman. In October 2023, Al-Manea announced that six African countries had agreed to join the bank as members. At the February 2024 African Union Summit in Addis Ababa, African leaders expressed unanimous support for Libya's efforts to establish the bank.

== Leadership and Political Support ==
In February 2020, the African Union appointed H.E. Nana Addo Dankwa Akufo-Addo, President of Ghana, as the "Champion of the AU Financial Institutions." In this role, he is tasked with providing political leadership to accelerate the establishment of the AIB, the African Monetary Fund, and the African Central Bank. At a presidential dialogue in February 2024, President Akufo-Addo highlighted the urgent need to reform the global financial architecture and strengthen African financial institutions.

The push for continental financial integration has gained momentum. In July 2024, the AU Assembly called on all member states to work with "renewed zeal" to sign and ratify the legal instruments for the AIB and the African Monetary Fund. The Assembly also requested that an Extraordinary Session be convened before the end of 2024, dedicated solely to the establishment of the AU's financial institutions.

Additionally, February 2024 saw the launch of the Alliance of African Multilateral Financial Institutions (AAMFI), also known as the "Africa Club." This initiative aims to coordinate African financial institutions and strengthen the continent's influence in the global financial system.

== Capital and Headquarters ==
The African Investment Bank is estimated to have a capital of approximately $25 billion.

Article 5 of the Bank's Statute confirms that the headquarters will be located in Tripoli, Libya. This was formally decided by the AU Assembly in January 2005.

== Governance and Mandate ==
The legal framework for the AIB is established by the Protocol on the African Investment Bank, adopted on February 4, 2009, and its accompanying Statute. The bank's stated purpose is "to foster economic integration and development through investment in development projects in line with the objectives of the Union."

Article 17 of the Agreement outlines the following governing principles for the AIB's banking operations:

1. Operations are principally for financing specific projects, including national, sub-regional, or regional development schemes for members. This may include financing national development institutions in Africa that serve the AIB's mandate.
2. In selecting projects, the AIB will evaluate their potential contribution to its mandate, rather than the type of project.
3. The AIB will not finance any undertaking in a member's territory if that member objects.
4. In considering applications for loans or guarantees, the AIB will assess the borrower's ability to obtain financing or facilities from other sources.
5. In making or guaranteeing loans, the AIB will consider whether the borrower and its guarantor can meet their obligations, and whether the interest rate, other charges, and the repayment schedule are appropriate.
6. Proceeds can only be used to procure goods produced by member states, except where the Board of Directors permits procurement from non-members or of goods produced by non-members. Such exceptions may be granted in special circumstances, for instance, if a non-member provides significant financing to the AIB.
7. In the case of a direct loan, the borrower can draw funds only for project expenditures as they are incurred.
8. The AIB will take measures to ensure that loan proceeds are used only for the purposes for which the loan was granted.
9. The AIB will avoid a disproportionate amount of its resources benefiting any single member.
10. The AIB will seek reasonable diversification in its equity capital investments and will not assume management of any entity or enterprise in which it has an investment, except where necessary to safeguard its investment.
11. The AIB will apply sound banking principles, particularly to its investments in equity capital.
12. In guaranteeing loans made by other investors, the AIB will receive suitable compensation for the risk it assumes.

== Membership ==
According to Article 4 of the Agreement, AIB membership is open to all AU members. Eligible countries that do not become members when operations begin may be admitted later, subject to terms and conditions established by the Board of Governors (BOG). Admission requires an affirmative vote from at least four-fifths of the Governors, representing no less than three-fourths of the members' total voting power.

== Capital ==
The AIB's initial authorized capital stock has yet to be determined. It will be divided into a number of shares with a specific par value, which shall be available to members for subscription in accordance with the provisions of the Agreement. The authorized capital stock shall be divided into paid-in shares and callable shares. The BOG will from time to time determine the proportion of authorized capital in paid-in shares and callable shares. The BOG may increase the authorized capital stock under terms and conditions it deems advisable. An increase in the authorized capital stock must be approved by a vote of at least four-fifths of the Governors, representing no less than three-fourths of the members' total voting power.
