= Common Monetary Area =

Monetary Union in southern Africa

Member states of the Common Monetary Area (CMA)

The Common Monetary Area (CMA) links South Africa, Namibia, Lesotho and Eswatini into a monetary union. The Southern African Customs Union (SACU) includes all CMA members in addition to Botswana, which replaced the rand with the pula in 1976 as a means of establishing an independent monetary policy. The CMA facilitates trade and promotes economic development between its member states.

Although the South African rand is legal tender across the CMA, the other member states issue their own currencies exchanged at par with it: the Lesotho loti, Namibian dollar and Swazi lilangeni. Foreign exchange regulations and monetary policy throughout the CMA continue to reflect the influence of the South African Reserve Bank.

== History ==
The CMA, enacted in July 1986, originated from the Rand Monetary Area (RMA), which was formally established in December 1974; the signatories of the latter were South Africa, Lesotho, and Swaziland. In that year Swaziland and Lesotho established their own national currencies, now called the lilangeni and the loti, respectively. In 1980 Lesotho established its own central bank and began issuing its national currency at a one to one rate to the rand.

While the formal arrangements date back to 1974, they ultimately stem from informal arrangements spanning back to prior to the formation of the Union of South Africa in 1910 and when the South African Reserve Bank was formed in 1921, the South African pound became the sole circulating legal tender in the territories that today form the CMA alongside Bechuanaland (now Botswana). This arrangement continued when the South African pound was replaced by the South African rand in 1961. The lack of monetary policy discretion, a formal framework for consultation and sharing of seigniorage by South Africa for the smaller territories led to protracted negotiations which ultimately resulted in the formal 1974 agreement, however Botswana decided against joining the formalized arrangements and pursued an independent currency with its own central bank.

In 1989 the CMA changed its exchange restrictions because of some limitations in the conversion of balances consequence of the termination of the agreement of one party. The CMA was replaced by the present Multilateral Monetary Area (MMA) in February 1992, when Namibia formally joined the monetary union. In 1993 Namibia issued its own currency, the Namibian dollar.

In 2002 a new revenue-sharing formula was introduced in SACU, which included a development component. In 2003 Swaziland reauthorized the use of the rand as legal tender in the interest of facilitating exchange between these countries.

== Institutional framework ==
The currency agreement made between these countries is one of the most important issues in the agreement. As issued before, each country has the right to have its own national currencies. These currencies are only legal tender in their own countries. However, the South African rand is tender throughout the CMA.

According to the agreement the CMA countries can have access to the South African financial markets, but only under some conditions. They can only have access to the money and capital markets through prescribed investments or approved securities that can be held by financial institutions in South Africa in accordance with prudential regulations between the LNS countries.

Compensation payments are based on the formula equal to the product and the volume of rand estimated to be in circulation in the member country concerned. The ratio is 2/3 of the annual yield according to the most recent South African government stock. This ratio was established on the assumption of a portfolio of reserve assets comprising both long-term and short-term maturities, assuming that it would be less than long-term.

Gold and foreign exchange transactions are two issues in the trade. The matter is that they can authorize foreign transactions of local origin. These transactions will have the same regulations as the ones effecting from transactions between the CMA and South Africa. Gold and exchange receipts from locals are requirements for the local surrender. Also, there are no restrictions on international transactions between non-residents.

== See also ==
- African Monetary Union
- Eco, another attempt at an African common currency, within the ECOWAS community.
- The West African CFA franc and Central African CFA franc (C.F.A.) are other existing African currency unions.

== Literature ==
- Jian-Ye Wang; Iyabo Masha; Kazuko Shirono; Leighton Harris (1 July 2007). "The Common Monetary Area in Southern Africa: Shocks, Adjustment, and Policy Challenges" (PDF). IMF Working Paper Series (7/158).
