= Equatorial Guinean ekwele =

Former currency of Equatorial Guinea

ekwele (Spanish)

ISO 4217
- Code: GQE

Unit
- Plural: bipkwele

Denominations
- Subunit
- 1/100: céntimo
- Plural
- céntimo: céntimos
- Banknotes: 100, 500, 1000, 5000 bipkwele
- Coins: 1, 5, 25, 50 bipkwele

Demographics
- Date of introduction: 1975
- Replaced: Equatorial Guinean peseta
- Date of withdrawal: 1985
- User(s): Equatorial Guinea

Issuance
- Central bank: Banco de Guinea Ecuatorial
- This infobox shows the latest status before this currency was rendered obsolete.

The ekwele or ekuele was the currency of Equatorial Guinea between 1975 and 1985. Although nominally divided into 100 céntimos, no subdivisions were issued. The name ekuele (plural the same) was used until 1979, whilst ekwele (plural bipkwele) was used after. The renaming of the currency to "ekwele" from "peseta" was motivated largely by a sweeping Africanization program meant to rid the country of its colonial past by removing Spanish names and references from the public domain; the ekpele was a pre-colonial iron currency used by the Fang and Beti people.

The ekuele replaced the peseta guineana at par, whilst the ekwele was replaced by the Central African CFA franc (written franco on Equatorial Guinean coins and banknotes) at a rate of 1 Franco = 4 bipkwele.

== Coins ==
The first ekuele coins were issued in 1975. All denominations depicted the first president Francisco Macías Nguema on the obverse and allegorical motifs on the reverse. These were aluminum-bronze 1 ekuele and copper nickel 5 and 10 ekuele denominations. In 1980 and 1981, coins of 1 ekwele, 5, 25 and 50 bipkwele were issued, replacing the previous coins which were then withdrawn from circulation. The smallest denomination was again issued in aluminum-bronze while the higher denominations were in copper nickel. This time all denominations featured the second president, Teodoro Obiang Nguema Mbasogo and had a design plan similar to the 1969 Equatorial Guinean peseta issue. This second issue was made in smaller quantities than the previous ones and these coins are considerably rare today. After 1985 Equatorial Guinea joined the Economic Community of Central African States and all local coins were replaced by coins of the Central African CFA franc.

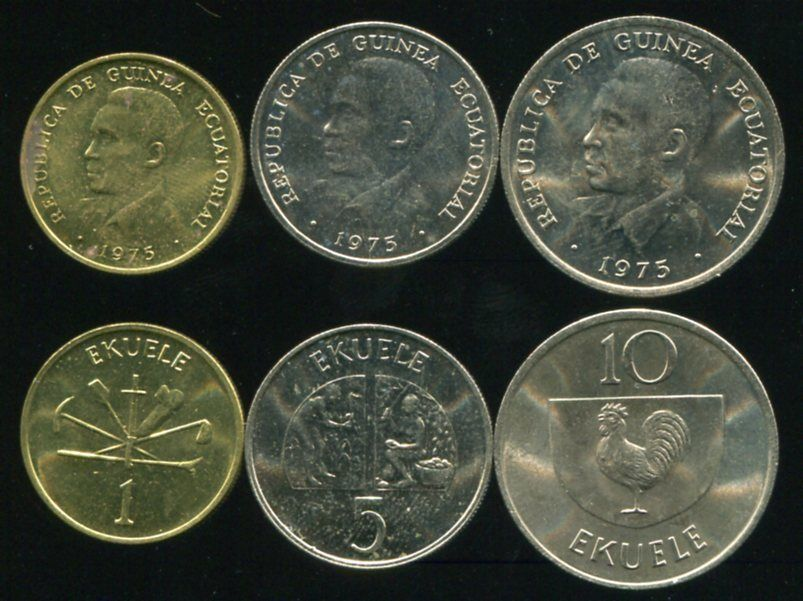
This series of ekwele coins was only minted in 1975 but was in use until 1981.

== Banknotes ==
The "Banco Popular" issued notes in denominations of 25, 50, 100, 500, and 1000 ekwele from 1975 printed by the Thomas De La Rue banknote company. After the fall of the Macías government the financial system was reformed with the "Banco de Guinea Ecuatorial" taking over the production of paper money in 1979 and issuing notes in denominations of 100, 500, 1000, and 5000 bipkwele. This second series as printed by Fábrica Nacional de Moneda y Timbre in Spain. After 1985 all local banknotes were withdrawn and replaced by banknotes of the Central African CFA franc.

Equatorial Guinean ekwele
Preceded by: Equatorial Guinean peseta Reason: renamed to remove colonial references Ratio: at par	Currency of Equatorial Guinea; 1975 – 1985	Succeeded by: Central African CFA franc Reason: joining currency union Ratio: 1 franco = 4 bipkwele
