= Romanat =

Romanat may refer to:

- Romanat, a village in Rrashbull, Albania
- Romanat, Ethiopia, a village on the Ilala River in Ethiopia
- United Principalities romanat, a proposed Romanian currency
