= Khaleeji (currency) =

Proposed currency of the Gulf Cooperation Council

The Khaleeji (Arabic: خليجي) was a proposed name for a common currency of the member states of the Gulf Cooperation Council (GCC).

== Proposed name ==
The term 'Khaleeji' is Arabic for "of the Gulf", and is traditionally associated with Eastern Arabia's Gulf states. The proposed name was turned down in late 2009, and no official name was later agreed prior to the withdrawal of an agreement for a GCC common currency. Although the name "Dinar" (Arabic: دينار, from Latin, denarius) has been suggested since it is already used in the Arab world.

== Backing ==
Since Islamic economic jurisprudence prohibits interest, or 'riba,' there was speculation that the future GCC currency would be backed by gold.

However, senior figures in the GCC administration have stated that the currency may be linked to the US Dollar or would tie-up with a basket of currencies in which the US Dollar would have a lion's share.

The currencies of Saudi Arabia, the UAE, Qatar, Oman, and Bahrain are pegged to the US Dollar. Kuwait's Dinar is pegged to a basket of currencies including the US Dollar and the Euro. Saudi Arabia rejected calls for the International Monetary Fund SDR to be used as a reserve currency.

== Gulf Central Bank ==
It was provisionally agreed on May 5, 2009, at the GCC consultative summit held at the Daraeya Palace in Riyadh, that Riyadh, Saudi Arabia, will host the Gulf Central Bank for this common currency. The UAE did not agree with this decision and criticized the fact that the large majority of GCC institutions were headquartered in Saudi Arabia. The UAE later withdrew interest in a GCC common currency and completely rejected being a part of it anymore. Later, on November 23, 2009, statements by the UAE Central Bank Governor Sultan bin Nasser al-Suweidi stated that the greatest obstacle was the lack of a precursor unit of account.

== Adoption in the context of GCC development ==
The currency, if adopted, would be the sole legal tender in Saudi Arabia, Kuwait, Bahrain and Qatar. Oman and the United Arab Emirates have announced that they will not adopt the new currency until further notice. It would be seen as a further step in the expanding remit of what was originally intended as an organization for security cooperation between the GCC states, which then grew into an economic agreement and a customs union in 2001 and 2003. The terms of what would be called the "GCC Monetary Agreement" followed shortly after that, with the convergence criteria of the single currency being decided in 2005. Oman became the first state to pull out of the union, in 2006, and the UAE, in 2009, the second and so far last state to withdraw from this tentative agreement to create a single Gulf currency.

Originally slated for adoption in 2010, Nasser al-Kaud, deputy assistant general for economic affairs at the GCC, admitted on March 24, 2009, that this deadline for the establishment of the monetary union would not be met on time due to the financial crisis and a lack of sufficient cooperation between the GCC member states.

In 2010, it was believed that a GCC common currency between the four states of Saudi Arabia, Kuwait, Bahrain, and Qatar could proceed for a number of reasons, including:

- The halting of the loans from the central banks of the four concerned countries to the public sector.
- The convergence of government law and policy in the financial sector.

However, as of 2020, no significant developments had been announced.

== See also ==
- Euro, the European Union's common currency
- Afro, proposed currency for the African Union
- Eco, another attempt at an African common currency, within the Economic Community of West African States (ECOWAS) community.
- The West African CFA franc and Central African CFA franc (CFA), both of which are existing currency unions in Africa.
- The Asian Monetary Unit, between the East Asian Community
- Monetary union
