= Equatorial Guinean peseta =

1969–1975 currency of Equatorial Guinea

peseta guineana (Spanish)
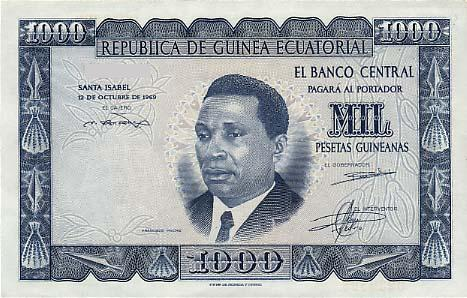
- Old Equatorial Guinean 1000 pesetas banknote, 1969

Unit
- Plural: pesetas

Denominations
- Banknotes: 100, 500, 1000 ₧
- Coins: 1, 5, 25, 50 ₧

Demographics
- Date of introduction: 1969
- Date of withdrawal: 1975
- Replaced by: Equatorial Guinean ekwele
- User(s): Equatorial Guinea

Issuance
- Central bank: Banco de Guinea Ecuatorial
- This infobox shows the latest status before this currency was rendered obsolete.

The peseta (peseta guineana) was the currency of Equatorial Guinea from 1969 to 1975. It replaced the Spanish peseta at par shortly after gaining independence from Spain the prior year and was later replaced, again at par, by the ekwele.

== Coins ==
Four denominations of coins were issued, all dated 1969. These were an aluminum-bronze 1 peseta and copper nickel 5, 25 and 50 pesetas. The coins were the same size as the corresponding Spanish peseta coins and were minted by Madrid. The designs are simple and straight forward with the largest denomination depicting the first national president.

== Banknotes ==
Three denominations of banknotes were issued dated 12 DE OCTUBRE DE 1969. These were 100, 500 and 1000 pesetas. In 1975, notes denominated in ekuele replaced the peseta guineana at par. In 1979, the portrait of Francisco Macías Nguema was removed from the currency of Equatorial Guinea after his overthrow on 3 August 1979, and subsequent execution on 29 September following a guilty verdict for crimes including genocide, mass murder, embezzlement of public funds, violations of human rights, and treason. The traditional coat of arms was also restored. Concurrent with the release of these new notes, the name of the currency was also changed from ekuele (plural ekuele) to ekwele (plural bipkwele). Equatorial Guinea entered the Franc Zone on 2 January 1985. The ekwele was replaced by the Central African franc (written Franco on these notes) at a rate of 1 franc = 4 bipkwele. In the late 1980s, Equatorial Guinea joined the Central African States, which issued its notes thereafter.
