= French Equatorial African franc =

The franc was the currency of French Equatorial Africa. The French franc circulated, together with distinct banknotes from 1917 and coins from 1942. It was replaced by the CFA franc in 1945.

== Coins ==
In 1942, brass 50 centime and 1 franc coins were introduced, followed by bronze coins in the same denominations in 1943.

== Banknotes ==
In 1917, the General Government of French Equatorial Africa made emergency issues of 1 and 2 franc notes. A provisional issue of 25 franc notes was produced in 1925 by overprinting notes of French West Africa. No further notes were produced until 1940, when the General Government made an emergency issue of 1000 and 5000 franc notes. These were followed in 1941 by Free French issues for 5, 10, 20, 25, 100 and 1000 francs. The Caisse Centrale de la France d'Outre-Mer took over paper money production in 1944, issuing notes for 5, 10, 20, 100 and 1000 francs. These continued to circulate as CFA francs after 1945.

== See also ==
- Central African CFA franc
- List of French possessions and colonies
