= North American monetary union =

Theoretical economic and monetary union

Map of a theoretical NAU, with Canada, Mexico, and the United States of America.

The currency symbol for the hypothetical Amero, by the Fraser Institute

The North American monetary union is a theoretical economic and monetary union of three North American countries: Canada, Mexico, and the United States.

Implementation would involve the three countries giving up their current currency units (the U.S. dollar, the Canadian dollar, and the Mexican peso) and adopting a new one, created specifically for this purpose (some versions of the theory assume only the United States and Canada would be included). The hypothetical currency for the union is most often referred to as the amero. The concept is modeled on the common European Union currency (the euro).

== Support ==
=== Canada ===
One argument is that it would save up to $3 billion in currency transactions. The same authors also stated that Canada's GDP could rise by up to 33% in a 20-year period given the adoption of a single currency.

The idea of a common currency has historically been unpopular in English-speaking Canada, in comparison to the French-speaking province of Quebec where it has received more support. A 2001 opinion poll found that in Quebec over 50% of respondents favored the idea of a shared currency, while in the rest of Canada a majority of respondents opposed the idea.

=== Support in other regions ===
Lower levels of currency cooperation have been practiced in the Americas before. Some nations such as Argentina and Brazil have at times tied their currency to the U.S. dollar. Some of them, such as Aruba, The Bahamas, Barbados, and the Organisation of the Eastern Caribbean, still do.

The U.S. dollar is officially accepted alongside local currencies in El Salvador (since 2001), Costa Rica, Nicaragua, Peru, Honduras, Panama, Bermuda and Barbados, and in practice two of these countries (El Salvador and Panama) are fully dollarized. In 2000, Ecuador officially adopted the U.S. dollar as its sole currency. In a few areas of Canada, the U.S. dollar can be accepted as currency alongside the Canadian Dollar, particularly in areas near border crossings. An example of this effect is Niagara Falls, Ontario, with large numbers of U.S. tourists (businesses still may not accept U.S. currency depending on their policy). The same is also true for the Canadian Dollar in many U.S. cities near the United States-Canada border.

== Criticisms and problems ==
Opposition to a North American monetary union exists high up in the governments on both sides of the Canada–United States border. Herbert Grubel, the first proponent of the amero, admits that American officials show no interest in the topic. He concedes that "there wouldn't be very much benefit for the United States" in an amero. Likewise, the Canadian Department of Finance strongly opposes the creation of a common currency with the United States, citing the loss of economic sovereignty. In briefing documents to former Minister of Finance Jim Flaherty, finance officials concluded:

A North American common currency would undoubtedly mean for Canada the adoption of the U.S. dollar and U.S. monetary policy. Canada would have to give up its control of domestic inflation and interest rates.

=== Trade-offs ===
From the point of view of the Canadian and Mexican governments, a major obstacle to the creation of a unified currency is the sheer dominance of the United States in any such union.

A paper from University of California, Santa Barbara puts forward the idea that the United States simply has too many advantages from the status quo to move toward a single currency. The United States dollar already acts as a global currency, meaning any transition to a 'new' currency would risk compromising this position and could cause a shift toward the euro or yen. The U.S. dollar is currently being used in over half of all the world's exports, double the total United States foreign trade. The adoption of the amero could threaten the seigniorage that the U.S. currently gains from its dollar. While seignorage would still be gained from the amero, this would be shared among the Bank of Canada, the Federal Reserve, and the Banco de México. Therefore, even if the amero were used just as much as the U.S. dollar, the advantages would be shared among two or more countries, and not exclusively held by the United States.

=== Differing economies and debt ===
Several problems could arise in regards to macroeconomic management. By submitting to a common currency, the countries would lose considerable autonomy in the management of the currency itself, including the setting of interest rates. Amongst the three potential participants, there is considerable difference in policy which would have to be reconciled.

Debt is a factor affecting currency prices. As of 2010, the debt of the United States continues to increase, while the debt of the Canadian federal government is being reduced. This is a clear advantage for Canadians and it would not be reflected if the currencies were to merge. The importance of commodities also factors into this equation.

A concern with any unified North American currency is the differing economic situations between each country. The Eurozone comprises broadly similar service-based economies based on high public spending (compared to the United States), high taxes and wealth being created by the sale of goods and services. North America on the other hand has three distinct economies; one based mainly on manufacturing, industry and agriculture with a demand for free trade (Mexico), another based on services such as retail, with higher taxes and low public spending (United States), and a third based on services with higher taxes and higher public spending, with a large sector in primary goods such as oil, mining and lumber (Canada).

Some observers blamed the Eurozone crisis partly on a lack of effective fiscal union. The Budget of the European Union is relatively small compared to the budgets of the Eurozone countries, which are set independently. Leading up to the crisis, some countries incurred more debt than the unenforced EU guidelines called for. Due to the centralized monetary union, countries experiencing problems were unable to apply local monetary policy to recover, and destabilized the currency which is also used by more economically healthy countries. The national budgets and debt levels of Canada, the United States, and Mexico, on the other hand, are also set completely independently, which could cause similar problems in a situation where monetary policy was centralized.

In contrast, the economies of the various states of the United States are strongly integrated. Internally, the U.S. also has strong fiscal federalism - all but one of the fifty states have a balanced budget amendment, and the federal budget is large compared to state budgets, resulting in effective federal stabilization of the currency and national economy.

=== Conservative and protectionist allegations ===
In November 2006, Lou Dobbs alleged on his CNN program that a "North American Union" was being implemented, without the knowledge and consent of the people who would be affected by the Union. The episode also briefly mentioned various claims about a common currency. The report focused on uncertainty prior to Felipe Calderón taking office as President of Mexico in late 2006, but never provided any substantive evidence to support this claim. The report suggested the union would be implemented by 2010, a deadline which came and went without such a union being implemented.

In 2006, Conservative Caucus Chairman Howard Phillips, WND columnist and author Jerome Corsi, activist Phyllis Schlafly, among others, reportedly formed a coalition against a North American Union. On January 22, 2007, Republican Representatives Virgil Goode of Virginia, Tom Tancredo of Colorado, Walter Jones of North Carolina, and Ron Paul of Texas were among the 43 federal lawmakers who introduced H. CON. RES. 40, a resolution advocated by the coalition, that expressed:

The sense of Congress that the United States should not engage in the construction of a North American Free Trade Agreement (NAFTA) Superhighway System or enter into a North American Union (NAU) with Mexico or Canada.

== Amero coins ==
In August 2007, rumors and conspiracy theories began circulating across the Internet regarding alleged United States Treasury-issued amero coins.

The inspiration behind these rumors may have been the posting of images of medallions created by coin designer Daniel Carr. Carr, who designed the New York and Rhode Island 2001 statehood quarters, sells medals and tokens of his own design on his commercial website, "Designs Computed" (also known as "DC Coin"). Among his designs are a series of gold, silver and copper fantasy issues of amero coins ranging in denomination from one to one thousand. The medallions have the legend "Union of North America" on the back with his company's logo, a stylized "DC", in small type. Concerning his amero designs, he mentions on his website:

My goal with these coins is not to endorse a Union of North America or a common Amero currency. I fully support the United States Constitution, and I would not welcome (in any form) a diminishment of its provisions. I expect that these coins will help make more people aware of the issue and the possible ramifications. I leave it up to others to decide if they are in favor of, or against a North American Union. And I encourage citizens to voice their approval or disapproval of government plans that impact them.

Unauthorized postings of images taken from his website have been reposted widely across the Internet, often being used as supposed "proof" of the amero coinage. Notably, white nationalist and former Internet radio talk show host Hal Turner ran a full article on his website about the "amero coin", claiming to have arranged for a United States Government minted "amero" to be smuggled out of the United States Department of the Treasury by an employee of that organization.

Following Turner's assertions of federal minting of ameros, a web site marketing the curio coins released a statement debunking Turner's claims of a government cover up regarding Daniel Carr's amero products. The urban legend investigating Web site Snopes also ran a further counter to Turner's claims, stating "neither the U.S. Mint nor the U.S. Treasury has a hand in creating these 'Ameros'. These coins are merely collectibles offered to the buying public by a private company in the business of manufacturing such curiosities."

Carr's designs had been available through his website since 2005, and according to a WHOIS search at Network Solutions, the domain "dc-coin.com" was registered by Daniel Carr on September 27, 2005.

In October 2008, Hal Turner released a video showing an apparent 20 amero coin, with claims that shipments of the currency had been sent to China. Yet the coin in Hal Turner's video is identical to a medallion on Daniel Carr's "dc-coin" website, listed as "UNA 2007 20 Ameros, Copper, Satin Finish".

== Amero bills ==
On December 3, 2008, Hal Turner's blog featured what he claimed were genuine "amero bills". He displayed photographs of purported 20, 50, and 100 amero notes. Turner did not identify how he obtained the images, saying only that "once again, my sources have come through". He claimed that the "new currency is already being printed and quietly distributed around the world". The web site Snopes.com suggested Turner was "beating the same tired, apocryphal drum" with his new claim. These images are art from the Flickr user aleatorysort, who created them as an artistic political commentary, and were therefore not actual currency.

== See also ==
- List of trade blocs
- Monetary union
- North American Free Trade Agreement
- North American Union
- Security and Prosperity Partnership of North America
- Special drawing rights
- World Currency Unit
- African Monetary Union
- Canadian dollar
- East Caribbean dollar
- Eco
- Euro
- European Currency Unit
- Khaleeji
- Mexican peso
- United States dollar
