= List of African countries by GDP growth =

This is a list of estimates of the real gross domestic product growth rate (not rebased GDP) in African countries for the latest years recorded in the IMF. The list includes all members of the African Union.

== List ==
Real GDP Growth Rates in Africa (2026)

Rank	Country	GDP growth rate (%)	Year
1	Ethiopia	▲9.20	2026 est.
2	Guinea	▲8.68	2026 est.
3	Uganda	▲7.51	2026 est.
4	Rwanda	▲7.23	2026 est.
5	Benin	▲6.97	2026 est.
6	Niger	▲6.73	2026 est.
7	Libya	▲6.72	2026 est.
8	Côte d'Ivoire	▲6.20	2026 est.
9	Djibouti	▲6.00	2026 est.
10	Tanzania	▲5.94	2026 est.
11	Democratic Republic of Congo	▲5.90	2026 est.
12	Mali	▲5.50	2026 est.
13	Chad	▲5.23	2026 est.
14	Liberia	▲5.11	2026 est.
15	Gambia	▲5.11	2026 est.
16	Togo	▲5.00	2026 est.
17	Zimbabwe	▲4.97	2026 est.
18	Guinea Bissau	▲4.90	2026 est.
19	Morocco	▲4.87	2026 est.
20	Burkina Faso	▲4.86	2026 est.
21	Cape Verde	▲4.79	2026 est.
22	Ghana	▲4.75	2026 est.
23	Botswana	▲4.75	2026 est.
24	Sierra Leone	▲4.55	2026 est.
25	Kenya	▲4.47	2026 est.
26	Mauritania	▲4.42	2026 est.
27	Zambia	▲4.29	2026 est.
28	Egypt	▲4.24	2026 est.
29	South Sudan	▲4.14	2026 est.
30	Comoros	▲4.08	2026 est.
31	Nigeria	▲4.06	2026 est.
32	Eswatini	▲4.04	2026 est.
33	Burundi	▲3.82	2026 est.
34	Algeria	▲3.78	2026 est.
35	Madagascar	▲3.64	2026 est.
36	Mauritius	▲3.40	2026 est.
37	Sao Tome and Principe	▲3.40	2026 est.
38	Cameroon	▲3.34	2026 est.
39	Congo Republic	▲2.84	2026 est.
40	Gabon	▲2.67	2026 est.
41	Central African Republic	▲2.61	2026 est.
42	Somalia	▲2.60	2026 est.
43	Namibia	▲2.40	2026 est.
44	Angola	▲2.29	2026 est.
45	Malawi	▲2.23	2026 est.
46	Senegal	▲2.17	2026 est.
47	Tunisia	▲2.11	2026 est.
48	Seychelles	▲1.52	2026 est.
49	Lesotho	▲1.11	2026 est.
50	South Africa	▲1.05	2026 est.
51	Sudan	▲0.71	2026 est.
52	Mozambique	▲0.52	2026 est.
53	Equatorial Guinea	▼2.69	2026 est.

== See also ==
- Economic growth
- Gross domestic product
- List of countries by real GDP growth rate
