= List of countries by past gross government debt =

This is a list of countries by past gross central government debt based on data by the International Monetary Fund, with figures in percentage of national GDP.

== Past gross government debt ==
Past gross government debt (% of GDP)
| Country | 2017 | 2018 | 2019 | 2020 | 2021 | 2022 | 2023 | 2024 | 2025 |
|---|---|---|---|---|---|---|---|---|---|
| Afghanistan | 7.998 | 7.384 | 6.130 | 7.848 | 8.906 | 9.423 | 9.910 | 10.374 | 10.879 |
| Albania | 71.895 | 69.509 | 67.748 | 83.288 | 83.201 | 77.099 | 74.801 | 71.915 | 69.149 |
| Algeria | 16.693 | 17.964 | 18.288 | 18.109 | 17.256 | 16.888 | 16.314 | 15.940 | 15.754 |
| Angola | 69.265 | 89.000 | 109.210 | 120.290 | 107.526 | 93.772 | 83.692 | 74.324 | 67.237 |
| Antigua and Barbuda | 92.322 | 90.718 | 84.468 | 113.687 | 112.659 | 102.007 | 92.089 | 86.103 | 80.340 |
| Argentina | 57.028 | 86.431 | 90.382 | 96.693 | N/A | N/A | N/A | N/A | N/A |
| Armenia | 53.704 | 51.233 | 49.945 | 60.710 | 61.751 | 60.560 | 59.199 | 57.574 | 56.061 |
| Aruba | 86.741 | 83.412 | 81.286 | 127.142 | 120.295 | 117.528 | 117.821 | 117.283 | 115.729 |
| Australia | 41.076 | 41.664 | 46.277 | 60.411 | 70.198 | 74.392 | 74.972 | 73.603 | 70.902 |
| Austria | 78.405 | 73.964 | 70.347 | 84.757 | 84.281 | 82.442 | 81.115 | 79.313 | 76.966 |
| Azerbaijan | 22.509 | 18.685 | 17.703 | 20.113 | 20.036 | 21.422 | 23.642 | 23.576 | 26.211 |
| The Bahamas | 53.014 | 60.955 | 58.841 | 68.709 | 81.959 | 80.183 | 78.496 | 76.383 | 74.872 |
| Bahrain | 88.138 | 95.018 | 103.363 | 128.282 | 130.581 | 132.871 | 134.797 | 136.262 | 137.132 |
| Bangladesh | 33.376 | 34.561 | 35.819 | 39.619 | 41.915 | 42.290 | 42.386 | 41.862 | 41.311 |
| Barbados | 158.264 | 125.585 | 122.222 | 134.094 | 124.526 | 117.242 | 111.337 | 105.678 | 100.112 |
| Belarus | 53.160 | 47.515 | 41.863 | 50.896 | 48.584 | 48.174 | 45.211 | 44.340 | 42.981 |
| Belgium | 101.765 | 99.898 | 98.748 | 117.696 | 117.068 | 118.340 | 119.598 | 121.248 | 123.024 |
| Belize | 104.397 | 101.458 | 105.081 | 134.609 | 132.268 | 129.574 | 129.109 | 128.154 | 127.046 |
| Benin | 39.598 | 41.080 | 41.230 | 41.786 | 41.365 | 39.870 | 38.371 | 36.777 | 35.189 |
| Bhutan | 111.724 | 110.469 | 104.405 | 121.263 | 125.713 | 121.030 | 114.527 | 104.318 | 97.524 |
| Bolivia | 51.260 | 53.850 | 59.000 | 69.447 | 68.313 | 67.570 | 66.906 | 66.585 | 65.992 |
| Bosnia and Herzegovina | 39.240 | 34.271 | 32.804 | 38.869 | 40.399 | 40.113 | 40.417 | 39.096 | 37.309 |
| Botswana | 13.397 | 14.197 | 15.101 | 20.571 | 24.002 | 25.916 | 27.916 | 30.118 | 31.465 |
| Brazil | 83.659 | 87.071 | 89.471 | 101.399 | 102.764 | 103.473 | 103.766 | 104.210 | 104.409 |
| Brunei | 2.826 | 2.586 | 2.575 | 3.208 | 2.880 | 2.723 | 2.629 | 2.557 | 2.493 |
| Bulgaria | 23.003 | 20.116 | 18.576 | 24.070 | 23.683 | 22.226 | 21.015 | 19.941 | 18.939 |
| Burkina Faso | 33.498 | 37.654 | 42.672 | 46.616 | 48.062 | 48.423 | 48.270 | 47.690 | 47.142 |
| Burundi | 44.720 | 50.506 | 57.371 | 65.033 | 68.927 | 70.702 | 71.903 | 71.972 | 71.027 |
| Cabo Verde | 127.218 | 125.592 | 124.981 | 136.789 | 137.577 | 136.272 | 129.852 | 122.962 | 115.437 |
| Cambodia | 29.995 | 28.638 | 28.613 | 31.472 | 31.441 | 32.110 | 33.355 | 35.121 | 36.855 |
| Cameroon | 37.679 | 39.474 | 42.669 | 44.727 | 44.968 | 44.898 | 44.085 | 42.832 | 41.386 |
| Canada | 90.548 | 89.747 | 88.619 | 114.648 | 114.972 | 114.671 | 112.831 | 110.017 | 106.240 |
| Central African Republic | 50.275 | 50.031 | 47.177 | 46.574 | 44.029 | 40.992 | 38.868 | 37.144 | 35.865 |
| Chad | 50.268 | 49.055 | 44.286 | 46.371 | 44.352 | 41.873 | 39.147 | 37.830 | 35.104 |
| Chile | 23.598 | 25.558 | 27.907 | 32.806 | 37.510 | 41.745 | 44.893 | 47.738 | 47.981 |
| China | 46.358 | 48.796 | 52.629 | 61.702 | 66.530 | 71.200 | 74.599 | 76.8341 | 78.068 |
| Colombia | 49.436 | 53.685 | 52.285 | 68.231 | 68.065 | 67.325 | 65.472 | 62.343 | 59.524 |
| Comoros | 18.445 | 21.053 | 25.237 | 30.424 | 32.406 | 32.941 | 33.435 | 33.833 | 33.940 |
| DR Congo | 19.053 | 15.298 | 14.750 | 16.140 | 13.420 | 11.276 | 9.270 | 7.693 | 6.259 |
| Republic of the Congo | 94.224 | 98.465 | 83.672 | 104.518 | 98.419 | 90.367 | 81.848 | 70.270 | 63.729 |
| Costa Rica | 48.336 | 53.078 | 58.380 | 70.052 | 74.763 | 76.758 | 77.165 | 76.306 | 74.163 |
| Croatia | 77.756 | 74.717 | 73.236 | 87.670 | 85.459 | 82.711 | 80.273 | 77.969 | 75.970 |
| Cyprus | 93.884 | 100.561 | 95.507 | 118.402 | 112.418 | 105.063 | 101.037 | 93.873 | 85.713 |
| Czech Republic | 34.236 | 32.071 | 30.246 | 39.133 | 41.390 | 42.507 | 42.792 | 42.446 | 41.858 |
| Côte d'Ivoire | 36.854 | 39.662 | 37.888 | 41.732 | 42.614 | 42.401 | 42.183 | 41.894 | 42.113 |
| Denmark | 35.820 | 34.214 | 29.393 | 34.544 | 39.287 | 42.556 | 44.451 | 45.278 | 45.883 |
| Djibouti | 48.184 | 46.508 | 38.474 | 40.556 | 41.726 | 40.839 | 40.033 | 39.521 | 38.916 |
| Dominica | 83.806 | 78.822 | 85.718 | 90.758 | 88.986 | 84.354 | 80.520 | 76.019 | 71.001 |
| Dominican Republic | 49.163 | 50.661 | 53.758 | 68.771 | 68.203 | 66.762 | 65.006 | 63.349 | 61.674 |
| Ecuador | 44.617 | 46.139 | 51.825 | 68.921 | 67.438 | 65.781 | 62.280 | 59.950 | 56.058 |
| Egypt | 103.161 | 92.652 | 83.800 | 86.590 | 90.598 | 87.801 | 84.441 | 80.814 | 77.018 |
| El Salvador | 67.184 | 68.000 | 69.402 | 88.987 | 92.538 | 95.584 | 98.916 | 102.771 | 106.800 |
| Equatorial Guinea | 36.235 | 39.151 | 41.063 | 51.174 | 48.223 | 49.384 | 48.484 | 47.493 | 46.134 |
| Eritrea | 202.536 | 185.607 | 189.351 | 185.790 | 173.471 | 165.657 | 157.733 | 149.848 | 142.185 |
| Estonia | 9.124 | 8.296 | 8.396 | 18.687 | 22.378 | 25.560 | 28.047 | 30.330 | 31.890 |
| Eswatini (Swaziland) | 25.115 | 33.836 | 38.049 | 47.926 | 49.902 | 52.134 | 52.556 | 51.996 | 51.389 |
| Ethiopia | 57.723 | 61.106 | 57.603 | 56.072 | 58.511 | 56.925 | 53.914 | 48.604 | 43.306 |
| (European Union) Eurozone | 87.619 | 85.734 | 83.984 | 101.142 | 99.975 | 98.366 | 96.954 | 95.574 | 94.265 |
| European Union | 83.283 | 81.293 | 79.205 | 95.347 | 94.607 | 93.200 | 91.850 | 90.506 | 89.255 |
| Fiji | 43.745 | 46.155 | 48.996 | 83.789 | 83.329 | 79.528 | 76.893 | 74.533 | 73.449 |
| Finland | 61.267 | 59.626 | 59.011 | 67.912 | 68.590 | 69.120 | 69.765 | 70.278 | 70.540 |
| France | 98.318 | 98.060 | 98.120 | 118.738 | 118.573 | 119.959 | 121.271 | 122.270 | 123.307 |
| Gabon | 62.886 | 60.914 | 62.401 | 73.857 | 70.525 | 65.197 | 59.855 | 54.767 | 48.980 |
| The Gambia | 87.008 | 84.611 | 80.010 | 83.102 | 77.006 | 73.908 | 67.793 | 61.942 | 57.003 |
| Georgia | 40.760 | 39.952 | 42.641 | 58.655 | 58.779 | 56.381 | 54.611 | 53.112 | 52.034 |
| Germany | 64.993 | 61.630 | 59.525 | 73.278 | 72.206 | 68.492 | 65.526 | 62.571 | 59.549 |
| Ghana | 58.306 | 59.129 | 62.763 | 76.668 | 74.653 | 74.637 | 72.393 | 71.860 | 71.330 |
| Greece | 179.275 | 184.759 | 180.915 | 205.249 | 200.533 | 187.331 | 176.990 | 169.749 | 165.910 |
| Grenada | 70.109 | 64.358 | 59.079 | 71.496 | 73.497 | 70.199 | 64.236 | 57.122 | 50.343 |
| Guatemala | 25.091 | 26.490 | 26.591 | 32.229 | 33.894 | 35.034 | 35.600 | 35.666 | 35.458 |
| Guinea | 40.483 | 37.956 | 34.498 | 44.883 | 45.919 | 44.314 | 42.916 | 41.971 | 40.958 |
| Guinea-Bissau | 50.734 | 60.184 | 67.616 | 79.810 | 79.037 | 77.816 | 75.317 | 72.691 | 70.040 |
| Guyana | 38.909 | 43.114 | 39.792 | 36.981 | 34.843 | 27.658 | 21.971 | 21.100 | 20.488 |
| Haiti | 37.970 | 39.659 | 47.686 | 54.363 | 52.442 | 48.906 | 46.315 | 44.775 | 43.840 |
| Honduras | 38.912 | 40.083 | 40.287 | 45.957 | 50.419 | 52.366 | 53.852 | 53.710 | 51.090 |
| Hong Kong | 0.055 | 0.052 | 0.269 | 0.290 | 0.272 | 0.255 | 0.242 | 0.000 | 0.000 |
| Hungary | 72.903 | 70.233 | 66.344 | 77.420 | 75.869 | 73.219 | 69.836 | 66.449 | 63.470 |
| Iceland | 43.246 | 37.376 | 36.997 | 51.732 | 52.529 | 52.747 | 52.868 | 52.514 | 53.096 |
| India | 69.423 | 69.575 | 72.344 | 89.330 | 89.856 | 89.517 | 89.022 | 88.552 | 88.155 |
| Indonesia | 29.396 | 30.069 | 30.490 | 38.477 | 41.828 | 43.181 | 43.261 | 43.168 | 43.068 |
| Iran | 38.187 | 40.327 | 44.743 | 45.367 | 40.435 | 39.210 | 38.641 | 38.502 | 38.350 |
| Iraq | 58.887 | 48.885 | 46.904 | 68.265 | 74.981 | 81.685 | 84.842 | 88.307 | 90.834 |
| Ireland | 67.411 | 62.915 | 57.331 | 63.676 | 61.254 | 59.227 | 55.804 | 52.512 | 49.239 |
| Israel | 60.607 | 60.877 | 59.979 | 76.521 | 80.002 | 81.420 | 82.239 | 82.647 | 82.683 |
| Italy | 134.145 | 134.808 | 134.804 | 161.849 | 158.305 | 156.569 | 154.874 | 153.830 | 152.568 |
| Jamaica | 101.292 | 94.405 | 93.861 | 101.334 | 92.432 | 84.277 | 77.427 | 72.159 | 67.323 |
| Japan | 234.462 | 236.568 | 237.955 | 266.176 | 263.968 | 263.045 | 262.785 | 263.016 | 263.985 |
| Jordan | 76.022 | 75.061 | 78.015 | 88.382 | 88.839 | 88.019 | 86.123 | 82.749 | 79.885 |
| Kazakhstan | 19.869 | 20.259 | 19.944 | 23.441 | 24.108 | 25.340 | 26.241 | 28.019 | 29.770 |
| Kenya | 56.881 | 60.235 | 62.099 | 66.389 | 70.463 | 73.329 | 76.262 | 77.745 | 78.625 |
| Kiribati | 21.423 | 19.708 | 18.344 | 17.722 | 24.952 | 31.521 | 37.600 | 43.223 | 48.452 |
| Kosovo | 16.232 | 16.953 | 17.529 | 23.379 | 25.853 | 27.998 | 29.613 | 31.152 | 32.567 |
| Kuwait | 20.485 | 14.838 | 11.771 | 19.255 | 36.570 | 49.341 | 65.225 | 78.422 | 89.925 |
| Kyrgyzstan | 58.786 | 54.818 | 54.144 | 68.082 | 66.785 | 64.055 | 61.243 | 59.684 | 58.638 |
| Laos | 57.198 | 59.650 | 62.643 | 70.937 | 70.659 | 70.617 | 70.037 | 68.848 | 67.443 |
| Latvia | 40.327 | 36.509 | 36.756 | 44.063 | 45.024 | 42.998 | 40.853 | 39.619 | 38.503 |
| Lebanon | 149.668 | 154.907 | 174.482 | 171.666 | N/A | N/A | N/A | N/A | N/A |
| Lesotho | 38.005 | 46.521 | 46.460 | 47.168 | 45.776 | 43.795 | 41.893 | 40.560 | 39.032 |
| Liberia | 33.901 | 39.419 | 53.274 | 61.750 | 63.555 | 64.188 | 63.178 | 61.640 | 60.294 |
| Lithuania | 39.344 | 34.078 | 37.665 | 48.252 | 47.682 | 44.928 | 42.249 | 40.001 | 37.636 |
| Luxembourg | 22.348 | 20.996 | 22.056 | 26.906 | 27.485 | 28.321 | 28.370 | 28.416 | 28.42 |
| Macau | 0.000 | 0.000 | 0.000 | 0.000 | 0.000 | 0.000 | 0.000 | 0.000 | 0.000 |
| Madagascar | 40.031 | 39.894 | 38.422 | 44.171 | 44.961 | 47.046 | 48.758 | 50.014 | 50.966 |
| Malawi | 61.488 | 63.117 | 63.431 | 70.663 | 75.072 | 74.942 | 73.420 | 72.786 | 71.341 |
| Malaysia | 54.395 | 55.543 | 57.243 | 67.581 | 66.025 | 65.043 | 64.123 | 63.008 | 61.996 |
| Maldives | 61.299 | 71.254 | 77.987 | 118.318 | 119.178 | 116.667 | 113.914 | 110.033 | 106.509 |
| Mali | 35.985 | 37.718 | 40.464 | 44.797 | 46.241 | 46.195 | 46.553 | 46.449 | 46.236 |
| Malta | 48.793 | 45.185 | 42.570 | 56.697 | 57.083 | 55.424 | 54.554 | 53.092 | 51.385 |
| Marshall Islands | 26.635 | 24.547 | 22.626 | 27.433 | 24.730 | 24.318 | 24.946 | 28.663 | 32.298 |
| Mauritania | 55.100 | 61.389 | 58.115 | 65.565 | 65.909 | 64.659 | 61.764 | 58.877 | 56.932 |
| Mauritius | 64.340 | 66.223 | 82.804 | 85.653 | 84.165 | 83.749 | 85.782 | 88.311 | 85.258 |
| Mexico | 53.963 | 53.606 | 53.749 | 65.541 | 65.599 | 65.406 | 65.164 | 65.023 | 64.905 |
| Micronesia | 21.923 | 18.761 | 16.998 | 16.495 | 14.978 | 13.673 | 12.424 | 15.799 | 19.046 |
| Moldova | 34.300 | 31.640 | 28.378 | 37.847 | 39.238 | 40.425 | 40.717 | 39.848 | 38.917 |
| Montenegro | 66.207 | 71.885 | 79.343 | 90.848 | 88.145 | 86.110 | 84.187 | 82.239 | 80.201 |
| Morocco | 65.109 | 75.177 | 80.500 | 91.100 | 95.073 | 101.961 | 102.893 | 100.832 | 98.856 |
| Mozambique | 102.443 | 106.246 | 104.378 | 121.331 | 123.511 | 123.351 | 116.803 | 104.885 | 92.081 |
| Myanmar | 38.470 | 40.415 | 38.844 | 42.375 | 45.211 | 46.959 | 48.411 | 49.673 | 50.549 |
| Namibia | 43.507 | 49.811 | 54.660 | 67.615 | 68.166 | 72.679 | 74.539 | 75.648 | 76.476 |
| Nauru | 76.689 | 74.316 | 61.992 | 59.739 | 57.298 | 55.502 | 54.105 | 65.965 | 78.821 |
| Nepal | 26.087 | 30.238 | 30.069 | 39.220 | 43.700 | 45.039 | 46.284 | 47.353 | 48.229 |
| Netherlands | 56.913 | 52.391 | 48.384 | 59.319 | 61.140 | 61.011 | 60.113 | 58.596 | 56.391 |
| New Zealand | 31.267 | 28.518 | 31.542 | 48.023 | 60.217 | 65.564 | 68.018 | 68.510 | 66.903 |
| Nicaragua | 34.080 | 37.550 | 42.139 | 48.255 | 50.259 | 50.474 | 51.249 | 53.366 | 55.501 |
| Niger | 39.530 | 38.939 | 41.726 | 48.350 | 48.645 | 45.491 | 43.023 | 42.201 | 41.625 |
| Nigeria | 25.340 | 27.657 | 29.142 | 34.978 | 35.509 | 36.231 | 36.538 | 36.977 | 37.449 |
| North Macedonia | 39.383 | 40.599 | 40.166 | 50.254 | 50.526 | 50.620 | 50.810 | 51.075 | 51.506 |
| Norway | 38.636 | 39.915 | 41.250 | 40.000 | 40.000 | 40.000 | 40.000 | 40.000 | 40.000 |
| Oman | 46.416 | 53.168 | 63.056 | 81.529 | 88.651 | 86.677 | 90.833 | 95.278 | 99.074 |
| Pakistan | 67.060 | 72.077 | 85.555 | 87.203 | 85.965 | 82.112 | 78.304 | 73.639 | 69.263 |
| Panama | 34.784 | 36.777 | 41.037 | 54.951 | 60.139 | 60.644 | 58.942 | 57.320 | 55.286 |
| Papua New Guinea | 32.484 | 36.782 | 40.059 | 46.702 | 47.738 | 49.160 | 47.776 | 47.727 | 45.690 |
| Paraguay | 19.841 | 22.243 | 26.107 | 35.453 | 35.697 | 35.247 | 34.429 | 33.919 | 33.357 |
| Peru | 25.413 | 26.164 | 27.122 | 39.482 | 39.131 | 39.681 | 39.394 | 38.803 | 37.796 |
| Philippines | 38.108 | 37.134 | 36.969 | 48.858 | 52.512 | 54.970 | 56.963 | 58.412 | 59.333 |
| Poland | 50.626 | 48.843 | 45.969 | 60.001 | 60.179 | 59.239 | 59.341 | 59.865 | 60.893 |
| Portugal | 126.143 | 122.004 | 117.737 | 137.240 | 130.047 | 124.059 | 119.607 | 117.789 | 115.895 |
| Puerto Rico | 51.628 | 54.647 | 56.206 | 64.806 | 65.271 | 65.569 | 66.307 | 66.971 | 67.502 |
| Qatar | 51.552 | 46.543 | 56.182 | 68.059 | 60.578 | 54.031 | 48.031 | 43.008 | 37.955 |
| Romania | 36.811 | 36.427 | 36.761 | 44.833 | 49.591 | 54.382 | 58.475 | 62.196 | 65.351 |
| Russia | 14.311 | 13.520 | 13.915 | 18.942 | 18.982 | 18.528 | 18.201 | 18.048 | 17.915 |
| Rwanda | 41.317 | 44.991 | 51.361 | 61.604 | 69.387 | 69.548 | 67.571 | 67.015 | 66.872 |
| Saint Kitts and Nevis | 59.413 | 57.212 | 56.220 | 69.069 | 63.943 | 58.402 | 54.119 | 53.179 | 52.216 |
| Saint Lucia | 59.869 | 59.979 | 61.321 | 85.096 | 87.702 | 88.650 | 86.511 | 85.696 | 84.545 |
| Saint Vincent and the Grenadines | 73.501 | 75.642 | 75.196 | 87.927 | 89.694 | 90.831 | 90.802 | 89.239 | 86.809 |
| Samoa | 49.655 | 52.894 | 47.525 | 55.606 | 65.339 | 70.368 | 73.502 | 73.333 | 73.227 |
| San Marino | 76.641 | 78.769 | 85.708 | 97.408 | 95.173 | 94.517 | 94.117 | 94.846 | 95.321 |
| São Tomé and Príncipe | 85.839 | 83.079 | 73.069 | 73.637 | 66.710 | 62.639 | 58.756 | 55.056 | 51.84 |
| Saudi Arabia | 17.160 | 18.980 | 22.790 | 33.418 | 34.349 | 34.088 | 32.970 | 34.409 | 35.546 |
| Senegal | 61.139 | 63.198 | 64.051 | 65.405 | 65.424 | 64.621 | 60.361 | 58.290 | 57.473 |
| Serbia | 58.727 | 54.452 | 52.836 | 59.546 | 56.965 | 53.105 | 50.242 | 47.591 | 45.040 |
| Seychelles | 62.275 | 57.682 | 55.260 | 88.562 | 84.984 | 80.337 | 73.030 | 67.290 | 61.361 |
| Sierra Leone | 69.155 | 69.089 | 70.049 | 77.366 | 78.483 | 76.434 | 73.384 | 70.194 | 67.296 |
| Singapore | 108.403 | 110.447 | 130.023 | 131.186 | 132.353 | 133.519 | 134.701 | 135.898 | 137.112 |
| Slovakia | 51.312 | 49.463 | 48.000 | 61.792 | 60.625 | 58.989 | 56.923 | 55.623 | 55.178 |
| Slovenia | 74.122 | 70.425 | 66.130 | 80.956 | 78.005 | 77.309 | 75.466 | 73.862 | 72.747 |
| Solomon Islands | 8.386 | 8.199 | 8.913 | 15.346 | 18.785 | 21.375 | 23.753 | 25.738 | 27.830 |
| South Africa | 53.022 | 56.710 | 62.151 | 78.821 | 82.758 | 85.679 | 87.275 | 86.921 | 85.174 |
| South Korea | 40.050 | 40.022 | 41.924 | 48.410 | 52.241 | 55.801 | 59.254 | 62.268 | 64.960 |
| South Sudan | 65.209 | 48.189 | 65.427 | 71.737 | 56.748 | 47.498 | 40.742 | 36.951 | 35.333 |
| Spain | 98.556 | 97.601 | 95.466 | 123.038 | 121.310 | 120.375 | 119.308 | 118.120 | 118.813 |
| Sri Lanka | 77.902 | 83.769 | 86.781 | 98.255 | 98.295 | 97.807 | 97.683 | 97.253 | 96.550 |
| Sudan | 159.180 | 186.708 | 201.578 | 259.385 | 250.713 | 221.157 | 210.023 | 204.861 | 198.865 |
| Suriname | 77.986 | 75.563 | 82.295 | 145.268 | 107.704 | 110.882 | 112.157 | 116.466 | 120.489 |
| Sweden | 40.696 | 38.803 | 34.826 | 41.863 | 41.720 | 41.429 | 39.541 | 37.766 | 36.035 |
| Switzerland | 42.703 | 40.956 | 42.138 | 48.749 | 48.476 | 47.945 | 47.333 | 46.242 | 45.279 |
| Taiwan | 34.514 | 33.978 | 32.769 | 35.602 | 35.611 | 34.569 | 32.967 | 31.189 | 29.330 |
| Tajikistan | 50.293 | 47.819 | 43.087 | 47.768 | 48.860 | 48.454 | 48.344 | 48.242 | 47.963 |
| Tanzania | 37.671 | 38.699 | 38.220 | 38.507 | 39.248 | 38.959 | 38.258 | 37.396 | 36.814 |
| Thailand | 41.782 | 41.957 | 41.095 | 50.448 | 56.371 | 56.096 | 56.859 | 56.937 | 56.866 |
| Togo | 75.952 | 76.152 | 70.854 | 73.458 | 71.108 | 68.887 | 65.571 | 62.229 | 59.212 |
| Trinidad and Tobago | 42.502 | 42.164 | 45.116 | 57.460 | 64.286 | 67.575 | 71.231 | 75.164 | 78.925 |
| Tunisia | 70.595 | 78.176 | 72.333 | 84.765 | 86.201 | 88.193 | 87.639 | 83.570 | 78.025 |
| Turkey | 28.027 | 30.173 | 32.986 | 41.666 | 45.517 | 47.342 | 48.055 | 49.332 | 50.379 |
| Turkmenistan | 30.592 | 31.366 | 32.783 | 30.911 | 26.681 | 25.857 | 29.794 | 32.362 | 33.322 |
| Tuvalu | 34.564 | 25.258 | 19.524 | 16.002 | 7.902 | 4.553 | 3.878 | 3.477 | 3.111 |
| Uganda | 33.800 | 35.122 | 38.229 | 46.048 | 50.933 | 54.865 | 57.314 | 57.785 | 55.372 |
| Ukraine | 71.620 | 60.551 | 50.055 | 65.692 | 64.301 | 61.838 | 58.191 | 54.985 | 52.140 |
| United Arab Emirates | 21.623 | 20.906 | 27.272 | 36.929 | 38.195 | 39.551 | 39.648 | 39.347 | 38.802 |
| United Kingdom | 86.245 | 85.724 | 85.352 | 108.026 | 111.522 | 113.437 | 115.265 | 116.388 | 116.970 |
| United States | 105.746 | 106.890 | 108.679 | 131.177 | 133.640 | 134.496 | 135.171 | 135.991 | 136.888 |
| Uruguay | 60.986 | 63.401 | 65.911 | 69.496 | 69.025 | 69.185 | 69.441 | 69.841 | 69.531 |
| Uzbekistan | 20.226 | 20.433 | 29.316 | 36.131 | 40.115 | 40.197 | 40.166 | 39.344 | 38.786 |
| Vanuatu | 46.360 | 48.083 | 45.342 | 47.688 | 50.863 | 52.883 | 54.075 | 55.636 | 57.143 |
| Venezuela | 26.004 | 180.789 | 232.786 | N/A | N/A | N/A | N/A | N/A | N/A |
| Vietnam | 46.309 | 43.580 | 43.365 | 46.623 | 47.104 | 47.179 | 46.907 | 46.381 | 45.644 |
| Yemen | 77.426 | 74.544 | 76.527 | 81.651 | 79.330 | 78.375 | 71.932 | 65.499 | 60.356 |
| Zambia | 65.523 | 77.243 | 91.898 | 119.974 | 119.567 | 116.462 | 112.258 | 107.743 | 102.683 |
| Zimbabwe | 52.866 | 37.343 | 10.806 | 2.358 | 2.226 | 2.202 | 2.148 | 2.060 | 1.975 |

== See also ==
- List of countries by government debt
