= United Principalities romanat =

Proposed currency of the United Principalities

Romanat (Romanian); Român (Romanian)

Unit
- Plural: romanați

Denominations
- Subunit
- 1/10: decime (Romanian); ban (Romanian)
- 1/100: sutime (Romanian); bănișor (Romanian)
- Plural
- decime (Romanian); ban (Romanian): decimi (Romanian); bani (Romanian)
- sutime (Romanian); bănișor (Romanian): sutimi (Romanian); bănișori (Romanian)

Demographics
- User(s): Moldavia Wallachia

Issuance
- Mint: Monnaie de Paris
- Website: www.monnaiedeparis.fr
- This infobox shows the latest status before this currency was rendered obsolete.

The romanat (Romanian pronunciation: [ro.ma'nat], plural romanați [ro.ma'naʦʲ]) or român (Romanian pronunciation: [ro'mɨn], plural romanâni [ro'mɨnʲ]) was a proposed currency of the United Principalities of Moldavia and Wallachia, a precursor of the Romanian nation state. It was subdivided into 10 decimi (Romanian pronunciation: [de'ʧimʲ], singular: decime [de'ʧi.me]) or bani (Romanian pronunciation: [banʲ], singular: ban [ban]) and 100 sutimi (Romanian pronunciation: [su'timʲ], singular: sutime [su'ti.me]) or bănișori (Romanian pronunciation: [bə.ni'ʃorʲ], singular: bănișor [bə.ni'ʃor]).

== Etymology ==
"Român", one of the proposed names of the currency, is the masculine singular form of the noun meaning "Romanian". "Romanat" is derived from the same noun. The names were inspired by the French franc. Ion Heliade Radulescu and Dionisie Pop Martian opposed the name "român" due to potential confusing constructions such as "o suta de români pe un bou" (one hundred Romanians for an ox).

== History ==
In the first half of the 19th century, more than 70 types of foreign coins circulated in the principalities of Moldavia and Wallachia. These were mainly currencies from neighboring countries: Habsburg Austria, Hungary, the Russian Empire, the Polish-Lithuanian Commonwealth, and the Ottoman Empire but also from the Netherlands, France, England and other European states. Even coins that were no longer legal tender in the issuing states were accepted in circulation in the Romanian principalities. The foreign currencies had a negative effect on the local economy, and the exchange rate constantly fluctuated.

The first attempt to regulate the monetary policy was drafted in Regulamentul Organic, a quasi-constitutional law adopted in 1830. The law introduced a new unit of account, named leu, after the Dutch lion thaler, which had circulated in the Danubian principalities for a long time. The gold ducat was equivalent to 31 lei and 20 parale, and the Austrian 20 kreutzer silver coin was equivalent to 2 lei and 10 parale. Several attempts to introduce physical currency failed before 1867.

One of these attempts, dating from 1859 to 1860, was initiated by Alexandru Ioan Cuza, the elected Ruling Prince of the United Principalities. The consul of the French Empire in Iași, Victor Place, a philo-Romanian, backed the project, and the prince managed to secure a loan of 60 million francs to finance the minting process. With his support, the decimal monetary system of France was adopted, and the coins were to be minted in Paris. The monetary unit, according to the model of the French franc, had to be called român or romanat.

In August 1860, the Central Commission of Focșani issued a legislative project for issuing silver romanat coins weighing five grams. Another project was proposed in 1861, prioritizing the minting of copper coins instead. The third and final legislative project dates from 1864, stipulating the denominations to be minted: 20 and 10 romanat gold coins; 5, 1, and 1/2 romanat silver coins; and 10, 5, and 1 sutime bronze coins.

However, Moldavia and Wallachia were still formally vassals of the Ottoman Empire. This situation only changed in 1877, after the Romanian War of Independence. In this context, the western European powers, and especially emperor Napoleon III could not fully endorse the introduction of the project currency, due to a potential conflict with the Ottoman Empire.

== Patterns ==
A first series of patterns were drawn in 1860 by the French numismatist Adrien Prévost de Longpérier, curator at the numismatic cabinet of the Louvre Museum, a friend of Victor Place. In 1864, a second attempt resulted in a five-sutimi pattern being minted. A ten sutimi pattern from 1864 may also exist, but hasn't been confirmed.

The engraver and mint of this pattern are not known with certainty. "AG" appears on the obverse of the pattern and may stand for an "Atelier de Gravure" in Paris. Between 1855 and 1878, the chief engraver of the Paris mint was Albert Désiré Barre. But his privy mark, the anchor, is missing from this pattern. Another theory is that the initials are in fact "AC", for Armand Auguste Caqué (1793-1881). But he regularly signed "CAQUE F" and not "AC".

== See also ==
- History of coins in Romania
- Romanian leu
- List of proposed currencies
