= African Central Bank =

Financial institution of the African Union

The African Central Bank (ACB) is one of the original five financial institutions and specialized agencies of the African Union. Over time, it will take over responsibilities of the African Monetary Fund.

When it is fully implemented, the ACB will be the sole issuer of the African single currency (the "Afro" or "Afriq") and/or working along African regional reserve banks, it will become the banker of the African Government and/or regional unions, it will be the banker to Africa's private and public banking institutions along African regional central banks, it will regulate, consult and supervise the African banking industry in sync with regional banking industries and unions, and it will set the official interest and exchange rates which may or may not be in sync with regional central banks; all in conjunction with the African Government's administration.

== See also ==
- Abuja Treaty
- European Central Bank
- Economic Community of West African States (ECOWAS)
- Euro
- African Monetary Union
- Central African CFA franc
- The Common Monetary Area
- Eco (currency)
- Monetary union
