= African Monetary Fund =

African financial institution

- Abbreviation: AMF
- Type: Financial institution
- Legal status: Treaty
- Headquarters: Yaoundé, Cameroon
- Region served: Africa
- Members: 55 member states
- Affiliations: African Union

The Africa Monetary Fund is a planned African Union financial institution, though in time its responsibilities will be transferred to the African Central Bank. This institution is one of the three financial institutions of the African Union. It will be based in Yaoundé, Cameroon.

== Proposed shareholding ==
The bank envisages to have a paid up capital of $23 billion.
