= Asian Monetary Unit =

Proposed basket of currencies

The Asian Monetary Unit (AMU) is a basket of currencies proposed by the Japanese government's Research Institute of Economy, Trade and Industry (RIETI). It is similar to and modeled on the European Currency Unit (ECU), predecessor to the euro.

The Asian Monetary Unit, which has been created as the joint project of 21st century COE project of Hitotsubashi University and RIETI, is a common currency basket composed of 13 East Asian currencies, such as ASEAN 10 plus Japan, China and South Korea. These data have been published on the website of RIETI since September 2005. After 4 years passed, a common currency basket composed of 13 AMU currencies plus three other countries, Australia, New Zealand and India, which are strongly connected with Asian countries, is newly created as "AMU-wide". The AMU-wide, which is a common currency basket composed of wider range of currencies, will be expected to use as a surveillance indicator corresponding to the extensive regional economies.

The calculation methodology of the AMU-wide and AMU-wide Deviation Indicators are same as those of the AMU. The benchmark period is defined as:

- the total trade balance of member countries, and
- the total trade balance of the member countries (excluding Japan) with Japan, and
- the total trade balance of member countries with the rest of world

should all be relatively close to zero.

== AMU baskets ==
The AMU is a basket composed of 13 currencies.

AMU
Country	Currency
Brunei	Brunei dollar
Cambodia	Cambodian riel
Indonesia	Indonesian rupiah
Laos	Lao kip
Malaysia	Malaysian ringgit
Myanmar	Burmese kyat
Philippines	Philippine peso
Singapore	Singapore dollar
Thailand	Thai baht
Vietnam	Vietnamese đồng
China	Chinese Yuan (Renminbi)
Japan	Japanese yen
South Korea	South Korean won

== See also ==
- Regional Comprehensive Economic Partnership
- Monetary union
- Chiang Mai Initiative
- Asian Clearing Union
