= West African CFA franc =

Currency of several West African countries

franc CFA BCEAO (French)
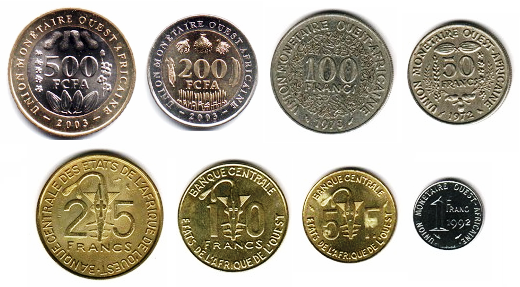
- Current coins of the West African CFA franc

ISO 4217
- Code: XOF (numeric: 952)

Units of account
- Symbol: F.CFA
- Nickname: céfa, franc
- Subunit
- 1/100: centime theoretical (unused)
- Symbol
- centime: c

Denominations
- Banknotes: 500, 1,000, 2,000, 5,000, 10,000 francs
- Coins: 1, 5, 10, 25, 50, 100, 200, 250, 500 francs

Demographics
- User(s): Benin; Burkina Faso; Côte d'Ivoire; Guinea-Bissau; Mali; Niger; Senegal; Togo

Issuance
- Central bank: Central Bank of West African States
- Website: www.bceao.int

Valuation
- Pegged with: Euro (€) = CFA 655.957

Usage of: West African CFA franc Central African CFA franc

The West African CFA franc (French: franc CFA or simply franc, ISO 4217 code: XOF; abbreviation: F.CFA) is the currency used by eight independent states in West Africa which make up the West African Economic and Monetary Union (UEMOA): Benin, Burkina Faso, Côte d'Ivoire (Ivory Coast), Guinea-Bissau, Mali, Niger, Senegal and Togo. These eight countries had a combined population of 105.7 million people in 2014, and a combined GDP of US$128.6 billion as of 2018.

The initialism CFA stands for Communauté financière africaine (transl. African Financial Community). The currency is issued by the Central Bank of West African States (BCEAO; Banque centrale des États de l'Afrique de l'Ouest), located in Dakar, Senegal, for the members of the UEMOA. The franc is nominally subdivided into 100 centimes but no coins or banknotes denominated in centimes have ever been issued. The production of CFA franc notes has been carried out at Chamalières by the Bank of France since its creation in 1945.

The Central African CFA franc is of equal value to the West African CFA franc, and is in circulation in several central African states. They are both commonly referred to as the CFA franc.

In December 2019 it was announced that the West African CFA franc would be reformed, which will include renaming it the eco and reducing France's role in the currency. The broader Economic Community of West African States (ECOWAS), of which the members of UEMOA are also members, plans to introduce its own common currency for its member states for which the name eco has also been formally adopted. The fifth target launch date is set for July 2027.

== History ==
The CFA franc was introduced to the French colonies in West Africa in 1945, replacing the French West African franc. The West African colonies and territories using the CFA franc were Ivory Coast, Dahomey, French Sudan, Mauritania, Niger, Sénégal, Togo and Upper Volta. The currency continued in use when these colonies gained their independence, except in Mali (formerly French Sudan), which replaced at par the CFA franc with its own franc in 1961.

In 1973, Mauritania replaced the CFA franc with the ouguiya at a rate of 1 ouguiya = 5 francs. Mali readopted the CFA franc in 1984, at a rate of 1 CFA franc = 2 Malian francs. The former Portuguese colony of Guinea-Bissau adopted the CFA franc in 1997, replacing the Guinea-Bissau peso at a rate of 1 CFA franc = 65 pesos.

The currency was pegged to the French franc at F.CFA 1 = F 2, from 1948, becoming 1 F.CFA = NF 0.02 after introduction of the new franc at 1 new franc = 100 old francs. In 1994 the currency was devalued by half to F.CFA 1 = F 0.01. From 1999 it has since been pegged to the euro at €1 = F 6.55957 = F.CFA 655.957.

== Coins ==
In 1948, aluminium 1 and 2 franc coins were introduced. These were followed in 1956 by aluminium-bronze 5, 10, and 25 francs. All carried the name "Afrique Occidentale Française". In 1957, 10 and 25 franc coins were issued with the name of "Togo" were minted for use in that country; these were issued only for that year. From 1959, all coins have been issued by the BCEAO.

From 1959 onward, the overall size and composition of the coins changed little, however "République française" and the stylized Marianne bust was dropped from all coins, replaced with the title "Banque Centrale des États de l'Afrique de l'Ouest" with the design on the 1, 5, 10, and 25 francs featuring a gazelle's profile, carried over from colonial issues, and a tribal mask between the denomination, which has become the emblem of the West African monetary union. Nickel-Steel 100 franc coins were introduced in 1967, followed by the cupro-nickel 50 franc coins in 1972. These also featured the familiar tribal mask. Small, stainless steel 1 franc coins were introduced in 1976, replacing the larger aluminum 1 franc coins, and were struck until 1995. The 10 and 25 franc coins saw a redesign in 1980, depicting a family using a water pump and a young woman with chemistry tools, respectively. A bimetallic 250 franc coin was introduced in 1992 to reduce excess change. These coins, however, proved to be unpopular in many regions and were discontinued after 1996. They are however, still legal tender. In 2003, bimetallic 200 and 500 franc coins were introduced, replacing smaller denomination notes. Like all the other West CFA franc coins, these depicted the mask emblem.

Unlike some coins of the Central African CFA franc, no modern circulation coins have been issued depicting the names of individual member states, nor any letters or marks of indication.

All CFA coins depict both a mint mark, along with an engraver's privy mark. The mint mark is located on the reverse on the left side of the denomination or date while the engraver's mark is located on the right.

Coins of the West African CFA franc
Image	Value	Technical parameters				Description			Date of first minting
Image	Value	Diameter	Thickness	Mass	Composition	Edge	Obverse	Reverse	Date of first minting
	1 franc	15 mm	1.5 mm	1.65 grams	Steel	Smooth	Emblem of Central Bank of West African States; text "BANQUE CENTRALE DES ETATS DE L'AFRIQUE DE L'OUEST"	Denomination and date of issue; text "UNION MONETAIRE OUEST-AFRICAINE"	1976
	5 francs	20 mm	1.5 mm	3 grams	Aluminum-nickel-bronze	Smooth	Emblem of Central Bank of West African States; text "BANQUE CENTRALE DES ETATS DE L'AFRIQUE DE L'OUEST"; "5 F"	Gazelle; date of issue	1965
	10 francs	23.5 mm	1.57 mm	4 grams	Aluminum-bronze	Smooth	Emblem of Central Bank of West African States; text "BANQUE CENTRALE DES ETATS DE L'AFRIQUE DE L'OUEST"; "10 FRANCS"	Two women and a child pumping water; date of issue	1981
	25 francs	27 mm	2.2 mm	8 grams	Aluminum-bronze	Reeded	Emblem of Central Bank of West African States; text "BANQUE CENTRALE DES ETATS DE L'AFRIQUE DE L'OUEST"; "25 FRANCS"	Laboratory assistant pouring liquid into a test tube; date of issue	1980
	50 francs	22 mm	1.6 mm	5 grams	Copper-nickel	Reeded	Denomination within a mixture of beans, grains, and nuts; text "UNION MONETAIRE OUEST-AFRICAINE"; date of issue	Emblem of Central Bank of West African States; text "BANQUE CENTRALE DES ETATS DE L'AFRIQUE DE L'OUEST"	1972
	100 francs	26 mm	1.5 mm	7.07 grams	Nickel	Reeded	Denomination within flowers; text "UNION MONETAIRE OUEST-AFRICAINE"; date of issue	Emblem of Central Bank of West African States; text "BANQUE CENTRALE DES ETATS DE L'AFRIQUE DE L'OUEST"	1967
	200 francs	24.5 mm	2.1 mm	7 grams	Bi-metallic coin (brass center plug with a copper-nickel outer ring)	Reeded and smooth sections	Denomination within produce; text "UNION MONÉTAIRE OUEST AFRICAINE"; "200 FCFA"; date of issue	Emblem of Central Bank of West African States; text "BANQUE CENTRALE DES ETATS DE L'AFRIQUE DE L'OUEST"	2003
	250 francs	26.3 mm	2 mm	8.2 grams	Bi-metallic coin (brass center plug with a copper-nickel outer ring)	Reeded and smooth sections	"Denomination within produce; text "BANQUE CENTRALE DES ETATS DE L'AFRIQUE DE L'OUEST"; "250 FRANCS	Emblem of Central Bank of West African States; text "UNION MONÉTAIRE OUEST AFRICAINE"; map of Africa	1992
	500 francs	28 mm	2.2 mm	10.6 grams	Bi-metallic coin (copper-nickel center plug with a brass outer ring)	Reeded and smooth sections	Denomination within produce; text "UNION MONÉTAIRE OUEST AFRICAINE"; "500 FCFA"; date of issue	Emblem of Central Bank of West African States; text "BANQUE CENTRALE DES ETATS DE L'AFRIQUE DE L'OUEST"	2003

== Banknotes ==
When the CFA franc was introduced, notes issued by the Banque Centrale des États de l'Afrique Occidentale in denominations of 5, 10, 25, 50, 100, and 1,000 francs were in circulation. 500 franc notes were added in 1946, followed by those of 5,000 francs in 1948. In 1955, the Institut d'Émission de l'Afrique Occidentale Française et du Togo took over the production of paper money, issuing notes for 50, 100, 500, and 1,000 francs.

In 1959, the BCEAO took over the issuance of paper money and reintroduced a 5,000 franc note. With the exception of a few early issues, the notes of the BCEAO carry a letter to indicate the country of issuance. The country letter codes are as follows:

- A – Côte d'Ivoire
- B – Benin
- C – Burkina Faso
- D – Mali
- H – Niger
- K – Senegal
- S – Guinea-Bissau
- T – Togo

The country codes are used to identify and categorise flow of cash between the CFA franc countries, as well as repatriating banknotes to their country of origin.

50-franc notes were last issued in 1959, with 100 francs not issued since 1965. 10,000 franc notes were introduced in 1977, followed by 2,500 franc notes in 1992.

In 2004, a new series of notes was introduced in denominations of 1,000, 2,000, 5,000, and 10,000 francs, with the 500 franc note having been replaced by a coin the year before. The newer notes contain updated security features and are more modern in design. The change was welcomed because of a perception that the old notes were dirty and disease-ridden. The colour of the 5,000-franc note was changed from blue to green. On November 30, 2012, the Banque Centrale des États de l'Afrique de l'Ouest (Central Bank of the West African States) issued a 500-franc banknote.

Banknotes of the West African CFA franc (1991–1992 issue)
Value	Obverse	Reverse	Remark
500 francs	Flood control dam; man	Garden tractor	A (Côte d'Ivoire / Ivory Coast); B (Benin); C (Burkina Faso); D (Mali); H (Niger); K (Senegal); S (Guinea-Bissau); T (Togo)
1,000 francs	Hauling peanuts; woman	Carvings; women; riverside storage bins	A (Côte d'Ivoire / Ivory Coast); B (Benin); C (Burkina Faso); D (Mali); H (Niger); K (Senegal); S (Guinea-Bissau); T (Togo)
2,500 francs	Hydroelectric dam; woman	Spraying pesticide	A (Côte d'Ivoire / Ivory Coast); B (Benin); C (Burkina Faso); D (Mali); H (Niger); K (Senegal); S (Guinea-Bissau); T (Togo)
5,000 francs	Smelting plant; women	A group of women	A (Côte d'Ivoire / Ivory Coast); B (Benin); C (Burkina Faso); D (Mali); H (Niger); K (Senegal); S (Guinea-Bissau); T (Togo)
10,000 francs	Building of Banque Centrale des États de l'Afrique de l'Ouest (Central Bank of West African States), Dakar, Senegal; man	A woman walking on a vine bridge	A (Côte d'Ivoire / Ivory Coast); B (Benin); C (Burkina Faso); D (Mali); H (Niger); K (Senegal); S (Guinea-Bissau); T (Togo)

Banknotes of the West African CFA franc (2003 issue)
Value	Obverse	Reverse	Remark
500 francs	Sawfish shaped brass weight of the Ashanti people for weighing gold dust; computerization in West Africa: hand touching a touch tablet PC which is connected to West African countries on the outline map of Africa	Hippopotamuses	A (Côte d'Ivoire / Ivory Coast); B (Benin); C (Burkina Faso); D (Mali); H (Niger); K (Senegal); S (Guinea-Bissau); T (Togo)
1,000 francs	Sawfish shaped brass weight of the Ashanti people for weighing gold dust; symbols of education and health	Camels	A (Côte d'Ivoire / Ivory Coast); B (Benin); C (Burkina Faso); D (Mali); H (Niger); K (Senegal); S (Guinea-Bissau); T (Togo)
2,000 francs	Sawfish shaped brass weight of the Ashanti people for weighing gold dust; transportation	Fish	A (Côte d'Ivoire / Ivory Coast); B (Benin); C (Burkina Faso); D (Mali); H (Niger); K (Senegal); S (Guinea-Bissau); T (Togo)
5,000 francs	Sawfish shaped brass weight of the Ashanti people for weighing gold dust; agriculture	Antelopes (Kobus kob kob)	A (Côte d'Ivoire / Ivory Coast); B (Benin); C (Burkina Faso); D (Mali); H (Niger); K (Senegal); S (Guinea-Bissau); T (Togo)
10,000 francs	Sawfish shaped brass weight of the Ashanti people for weighing gold dust; telecommunications	Birds (Tauroco macrorhynchus)	A (Côte d'Ivoire / Ivory Coast); B (Benin); C (Burkina Faso); D (Mali); H (Niger); K (Senegal); S (Guinea-Bissau); T (Togo)

== Controversy ==
There has been some debate over whether the West African CFA franc serves as a way for France to keep influence in the region, allegedly to the detriment to these nations. For example, France guarantees the value of the currency as long as the central banks of all of the nations involved keep at least 50% of their foreign reserves in the French treasury. Some see this as a way to keep the currency stable while other see it as limiting the economic independence of the West African nations that are involved. Even though during the early 1950s to the mid-1980s, CFA countries experienced higher real GDP growth and lower inflation rates than non-CFA Sub-Saharan countries, the economic shocks of the 1986 and 1993 caused the CFA franc to become increasingly overvalued and run increased deficits in the French treasury. Some policymakers have argued that the CFA franc be tied to a basket of currencies rather than one currency as it currently is. Also, they state that the reserve requirement should be restructured in order to give CFA countries more economic freedom. In November 2024, the 'Tournons la Page' network and the Sciences Po Center for International Research (CERI) published a survey on relations between West African and Central African countries from former French possessions. Nearly 95% of West Africans surveyed expressed their desire to leave. In May 2025, Ousmane Sonko stated that the CFA Franc, whatever its new definition, poses both a symbolic and economic problem.

== Exchange rates ==
Current XOF exchange rates
From Google Finance:	AUD CAD CHF CNY EUR GBP HKD JPY USD XAF NGN EUR
From Yahoo! Finance:	AUD CAD CHF CNY EUR GBP HKD JPY USD XAF NGN EUR
From XE.com:	AUD CAD CHF CNY EUR GBP HKD JPY USD XAF NGN EUR
From OANDA:	AUD CAD CHF CNY EUR GBP HKD JPY USD XAF NGN EUR

== See also ==
- Central African CFA franc
- Council of Arab Economic Unity (CAEU)
- Economic Community of West African States (ECOWAS)
- African and Malagasy Union (AMU)
- African Central Bank
- Eco (currency)

General:

- Monetary union
- Economy of Benin
- Economy of Burkina Faso
- Economy of Guinea-Bissau
- Economy of Ivory Coast
- Economy of Mali
- Economy of Niger
- Economy of Senegal
- Economy of Togo
