= Currency union =

Agreement involving states sharing a single currency

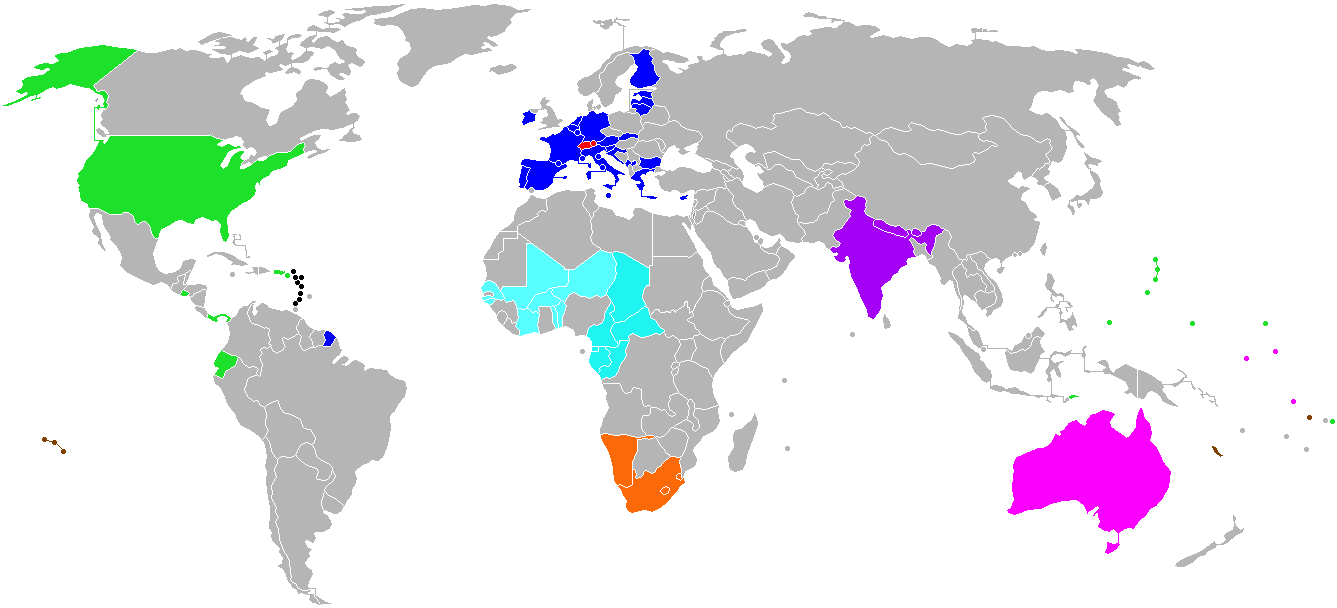
World map of current international currency unions: EUR Euro USD United States dollar CHF Swiss franc INR Indian rupee AUD Australian dollar XCD Eastern Caribbean dollar ZAR South African rand XOF West African CFA franc XAF Central African CFA franc XPF CFP franc

A currency union (also known as monetary union) is an intergovernmental agreement that involves two or more states sharing the same currency. These states may not necessarily have any further integration (such as an economic and monetary union, which would additionally have a customs union and a single market).

There are three types of currency unions:

- Informal – unilateral adoption of a foreign currency.
- Formal – adoption of foreign currency by virtue of bilateral or multilateral agreement with the monetary authority, sometimes supplemented by issue of local currency in currency peg regime.
- Formal with common policy – establishment by multiple countries of a common monetary policy and monetary authority for their common currency.

The theory of the optimal currency area addresses the question of how to determine what geographical regions should share a currency in order to maximize economic efficiency.

== Convergence and divergence ==
Convergence in terms of macroeconomics means that countries have a similar economic behaviour (similar inflation rates and economic growth). It is easier to form a currency union for countries with more convergence as these countries have the same or at least very similar goals. The European Monetary Union (EMU) is a contemporary model for forming currency unions. Membership in the EMU requires that countries follow a strictly defined set of criteria (the member states are required to have a specific rate of inflation, government deficit, government debt, long-term interest rates and exchange rate). Many other unions have adopted the view that convergence is necessary, so they now follow similar rules to aim the same direction.

Divergence is the exact opposite of convergence. Countries with different goals are very difficult to integrate in a single currency union. Their economic behaviour is completely different, which may lead to disagreements. Divergence is therefore not optimal for forming a currency union.

== History ==
The first currency unions were established in the 19th century. The German Zollverein came into existence in 1834, and by 1866, it included most of the German states. The fragmented states of the German Confederation agreed on common policies to increase trade and political unity.

The Latin Monetary Union, comprising France, Belgium, Italy, Switzerland, and Greece, existed between 1865 and 1927, with coinage made of gold and silver. Coins of each country were legal tender and freely interchangeable across the area. The union's success made other states join informally.

The Scandinavian Monetary Union, comprising Sweden, Denmark, and Norway, existed between 1873 and 1905 and used a currency based on gold. The system was dissolved by Sweden in 1924.

A currency union among the British colonies and protectorates in Southeast Asia, namely the Federation of Malaya, North Borneo, Sarawak, Singapore and Brunei was established in 1952. The Malaya and British Borneo dollar, the common currency for circulation was issued by the Board of Commissioners of Currency, Malaya and British Borneo from 1953 until 1967. Following the cessation of the common currency arrangement, Malaysia (the combination of Federation of Malaya, North Borneo, Sarawak), Singapore and Brunei began issuing their own currencies. Contemporarily, a currency reunion of these countries might still be feasible based on the findings of economic convergence.

== List of currency unions ==
=== Existing ===
Currency	Union	Users	Est.	Status	Population
Euro	International status and usage of the euro	Eurozone: Austria; Belgium; Bulgaria; Croatia; Cyprus; Estonia; Finland; France; Germany; Greece; Ireland; Italy; Latvia; Lithuania; Luxembourg; Malta; Netherlands; Portugal; Slovakia; Slovenia; Spain; and states with monetary agreement: Andorra; Monaco; San Marino; Vatican City; and unilateral adopters: Montenegro; Kosovo; and EU special territories: French Southern and Antarctic Lands; Saint Barthélemy; Saint Pierre and Miquelon; and one British overseas territory: Akrotiri and Dhekelia	1999/2002	Formal, common policy and EMU for EU members; Formal for Monaco and Akrotiri and Dhekelia (which form part of the EU's customs territory); Informal for Kosovo, Montenegro; Formal for Andorra and San Marino (which are in customs union with the EU's customs territory	351,379,988
West African CFA franc	Issued by the Institut d'émission d'outre-mer between 1945 and 1962 then by the Central Bank of West African States	Benin; Burkina Faso; Guinea-Bissau; Ivory Coast; Mali; Niger; Senegal; Togo	1945	Formal, common policy	151,978,440
Central African CFA franc	Issued by the Institut d'émission d'outre-mer between 1945 and 1962 then by the Bank of Central African States	Cameroon; Central African Republic; Chad; Equatorial Guinea; Gabon; Republic of the Congo	1945	Formal, common policy	64,800,000
CFP franc	Issued by the Institut d'émission d'outre-mer	French Polynesia; New Caledonia; Wallis and Futuna	1945	Formal, common policy	552,537
Eastern Caribbean dollar	Issued by the Eastern Caribbean Central Bank of the ECCU and the OECS.	Anguilla; Antigua and Barbuda; Dominica; Grenada; Montserrat; Saint Kitts and Nevis; Saint Lucia; Saint Vincent and the Grenadines	1965	Formal, common policy; de facto EMU for CSME members	625,000
Caribbean guilder		Curaçao; Sint Maarten		Formal	214,303
Singapore dollar and Brunei dollar	Managed together by the Monetary Authority of Singapore	Singapore; Brunei	1967	Formal; currencies mutually exchangeable	5,137,000
Hong Kong dollar		Hong Kong; Macau		Informal	8,181,800
Danish krone		Denmark and Realm: Faroe Islands; Greenland		Informal	6,049,579
New Zealand dollar		New Zealand and Realm: Cook Islands; Niue; Tokelau; and one British overseas territory: Pitcairn Islands	1967	Informal	4,411,000
Israeli new sheqel		Israel; Palestine	1927/1986	Informal	11,738,000
Jordanian dinar		Jordan; Palestine (West Bank only)		Informal	8,922,000
Egyptian pound		Egypt; Palestine (Gaza Strip only)		Informal	109,450,000
Indian rupee		India; Bhutan; Nepal	1974	Informal; Nepal minor usage	1,352,000,000
Russian ruble		Russia; Abkhazia; South Ossetia; Transnistria	2008	Informal	142,177,000
South African rand	Common Monetary Area	South Africa; Eswatini; Lesotho; Namibia	1974	Formal; de facto customs and monetary union for the SACU member countries	52,924,669
Swiss franc		Switzerland; Liechtenstein	1920	Informal; de facto economic and monetary union—1924 creation of a customs union, then members of the European Free Trade Association (a common market), and now also part of the European Single Market.	8,547,015
Turkish lira		Turkey; Northern Cyprus	1983	Informal	75,081,100
Australian dollar		Australia and external territories: Ashmore and Cartier Islands; Australian Antarctic Territory; Christmas Island; Cocos (Keeling) Islands; Coral Sea Islands Territory; Heard Island and McDonald Islands; Norfolk Island; Kiribati; Nauru; Tuvalu	1966	Informal	24,557,000
Pound sterling	Sterling area (former)	United Kingdom and Overseas Territories: British Antarctic Territory; British Indian Ocean Territory (de jure); Falkland Islands; Gibraltar; Saint Helena, Ascension and Tristan da Cunha; South Georgia and the South Sandwich Islands; and Crown Dependencies: Guernsey; Jersey; Isle of Man	1939	Semi-formal. UK banknotes are legal tender in locations outside the UK. Local currencies are pegged to the GBP but not necessarily accepted in the UK: Guernsey pound, Manx pound, Jersey pound and Alderney pound, Falkland Islands pound, Gibraltar pound, Saint Helena pound.	62,321,000
United States dollar		United States and insular areas: American Samoa; Guam; Northern Mariana Islands; Puerto Rico; United States Virgin Islands; United States Minor Outlying Islands; and Compact of Free Association members: Marshall Islands; Federated States of Micronesia; Palau; and two British overseas territories: British Virgin Islands; Turks and Caicos Islands; and Caribbean Netherlands: Bonaire; Saba; Sint Eustatius; and unilateral adopters: Ecuador; El Salvador; Panama; Timor-Leste	1904 (Panama only)	Formal for insular areas and sovereign status with Compact of Free Association, informal for other areas	339,300,000

Note: Every customs and monetary union and economic and monetary union also has a currency union.

Zimbabwe is theoretically in a currency union with four blocs as the South African rand, Botswana pula, British pound and US dollar freely circulate. The US dollar was, until 2016, official tender.

Additionally, the autonomous and dependent territories, such as some of the EU member state special territories, are sometimes treated as separate customs territory from their mainland state or have varying arrangements of formal or de facto customs union, common market and currency union (or combinations thereof) with the mainland and in regards to third countries through the trade pacts signed by the mainland state.

==== Currency union in Europe ====
The European currency union is a part of the Economic and Monetary Union of the European Union (EMU). The EMU was formed during the second half of the 20th century after historic agreements, such as the Treaty of Paris (1951) and the Maastricht Treaty (1992). In 2002, the euro, a single European currency, was adopted by 12 member states. Currently, the Eurozone has 21 member states. The other members of the European Union are required to adopt the euro as their currency (except for Denmark, which has been given the right to opt out), but there has not been a specific date set. The main independent institution responsible for stability of the euro is the European Central Bank (ECB). The Eurosystem groups together the ECB and the national central banks (NCBs) of the Member States whose currency is the euro. The European System of Central Banks (ESCB) is made up of the ECB and the national central banks of all Member States of the European Union (EU), regardless of whether or not they have adopted the euro. The Governing Board consists of the executive committee of the ECB and the governors of individual national banks, and determines the monetary policy, as well as short-term monetary objectives, key interest rates and the extent of monetary reserves.

=== Planned ===
Community	Currency	Region	Target date	Notes
East African Community	East African shilling	Africa	2012 (not met), 2015 (not met), 2024 (not met), 2031	
West African Monetary Zone	Eco	Africa	2027	Inside Economic Community of West African States, planned to eventually merge with West African franc
ASEAN+3	Asian Monetary Unit	Asia	?	a free trade agreements matrix partially established
Cooperation Council for the Arab States of the Gulf	Khaleeji	Arabian Peninsula	?	Oman and the United Arab Emirates do not intend to adopt the currency at first but will do at a later date.
African Economic Community	Afro or Afriq	Africa	2028	Planned for 2028 or later
Brazil, Argentina and possibly other countries	Sur	Latin America	?	As the Financial Times reports, Brazil and Argentina will announce in January 2023 that they are starting preparatory work on a common currency "Sur" (South). The initiative would later be extended to invite other Latin American nations.

=== Disbanded ===
- between Bahrain and (Emirate of Abu Dhabi) Abu Dhabi using the Bahraini dinar
- between Bahrain, Kuwait, Oman, Qatar and the Trucial States, using the Gulf rupee from 1959 until 1966
- between Aden, South Arabia, Bahrain, Kenya, Kuwait, Oman, Qatar, British Somaliland, the Trucial States, Uganda, Zanzibar and (British Raj) British India (later independent India) using the Indian rupee until 1974
- between Belgium and the Grand-Duchy of Luxemburg (Belgium-Luxembourg Economic Union) using the Belgian/Luxembourgish franc from 1921 to the Euro
- between (British Raj) British India and the Straits Settlements (1837–1867) using the Indian rupee
- between Czech Republic and Slovakia (briefly from January 1, 1993, to February 8, 1993) using the Czechoslovak koruna
- between Ethiopia and Eritrea using the Ethiopian birr
- between France, Monaco, and Andorra using the French franc
- between Austria-Hungary and Liechtenstein using the Austro-Hungarian krone
- between the Eastern Caribbean, Jamaica, Barbados, Trinidad and Tobago and British Guiana using the British West Indies dollar
- between the Eastern Caribbean, Barbados, Trinidad and Tobago and British Guiana using the Eastern Caribbean dollar
- between Italy, (Holy See) Vatican City, and San Marino using the Italian lira
- between Jamaica and the Cayman Islands using the Jamaican pound and later Jamaican dollar
- between Kenya, Uganda, and Zanzibar using the East African rupee
- between Kenya, Uganda, and Zanzibar (and later Tanganyika) using the East African florin
- between Kenya, Tanganyika and Zanzibar (later merged as Tanzania), Uganda, (Federation of South Arabia) South Arabia, British Somaliland and Italian Somaliland using the East African shilling
- Latin Monetary Union (1865–1927), initially between (French Third Republic) France, Belgium, (Kingdom of Italy) Italy and Switzerland, and later involving (Kingdom of Greece) Greece, (Kingdom of Romania) Romania, Spain and other countries.
- between Liberia and the United States using the United States dollar
- between Mauritius and Seychelles using the Mauritian rupee
- between Nigeria, the Gambia, Sierra Leone, (Gold Coast (British colony)) the Gold Coast and Liberia using the British West African pound
- between (Kingdom of Prussia) Prussia and the North German states (1838–1857) using the North German thaler
- between Russia and the former Soviet republics (1991–1993) using the Soviet ruble
- between Armenia and (Republic of Artsakh) Artsakh using the Armenian dram
- between Qatar and all the emirates of the United Arab Emirates, except Abu Dhabi using the Qatari and Dubai riyal
- between Saudi Arabia and Qatar using the Saudi riyal
- between Western Samoa and New Zealand using the New Zealand pound
- Scandinavian Monetary Union (1870s until 1924), between Denmark, Norway and Sweden
- between the Solomon Islands, Papua New Guinea and Australia using the Australian dollar
- between Australia, Papua, New Guinea, Nauru, the Solomon Islands, and the Gilbert and Ellice Islands using the Australian pound
- between Bavaria, Baden, Württemberg, Frankfurt, and Hohenzollern using the South German guilder
- between Spain and Andorra using the Spanish peseta
- between Trinidad and Tobago and Grenada using the Trinidad and Tobago dollar
- between Brunei, Malaysia, and Singapore (1953–1967) using the Malaya and British Borneo dollar
- between Cambodia, Laos, Guangzhouwan, Annam, Tonkin, and Cochinchina (later (State of Vietnam) Vietnam) between 1885 and 1952 using the French Indochinese piastre
- between South Africa, South West Africa, and Bechuanaland (later independent Botswana) using the South African rand
- between Egypt, Anglo-Egyptian Sudan, and Mandatory Palestine (until 1926) using the Egyptian pound
- between West Germany and East Germany between 1 July 1990 and 3 October 1990, as part of a temporary, so-called "Monetary, Economic and Social Union" prior to German reunification.
- between what ultimately became the Republic of Ireland and the United Kingdom, between 1928 and 1979. The Irish Pound was held at exactly the same value as Sterling for this period, although it was not accepted for payments in the UK.
- Yen Bloc (between 1905 and 1945), between the Empire of Japan, the Korean Empire, Manchukuo, Mengjiang, the Wang Jingwei regime, and Japanese-occupied Southeast Asia prior to and during World War II.

=== Never materialized ===
- proposed Pan-American monetary union – abandoned in the form proposed by Argentina
- proposed monetary union between the United Kingdom and Norway using the pound sterling during the late 1940s and early 1950s
- proposed gold-backed, pan-African monetary union put forward by Muammar Gaddafi prior to his death

== See also ==
- List of pegged currencies
- North American Currency Union (Amero)
