= Central African CFA franc =

Currency of several Central African countries

Franc CFA de l'Afrique centrale (French) فرنك م ف أ وسط أفريقيا (Arabic) Franco CFA de África Central (Spanish) Franco CFA da África Central (Portuguese)
1000 Central African CFA francs, since December 2022.
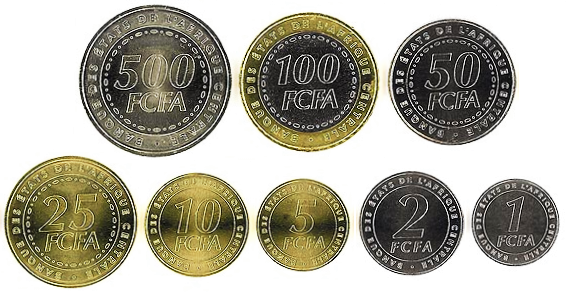
Currency coins of the Central African CFA franc.

ISO 4217
- Code: XAF (numeric: 950)

Units of account
- Symbol: F.CFA
- Nickname: céfa, franc
- Subunit
- 1/100: centime theoretical (unused)
- Symbol
- centime: c

Denominations
- Banknotes: 500, 1,000, 2,000, 5,000, 10,000 francs
- Coins: 1, 2, 5, 10, 25, 50, 100, 200, 500 francs

Demographics
- User(s): Cameroon; Central African Republic; Chad; Republic of the Congo; Equatorial Guinea; Gabon

Issuance
- Central bank: Bank of Central African States
- Website: www.beac.int

Valuation
- Pegged with: €1 = F.CFA 655.957

Usage of: West African CFA franc Central African CFA franc

The Central African CFA franc (French: franc CFA or simply franc; ISO code: XAF; abbreviation: F.CFA) is the currency used in six independent states in Central Africa: Cameroon, the Central African Republic, Chad, the Republic of the Congo, Equatorial Guinea and Gabon. These six countries had a combined population of 55.2 million in 2020, and their total GDP exceeded US$100 billion (as of 2021).

CFA originally stood for Colonies françaises d'Afrique ("French colonies of Africa"); after these states gained independence, its name was changed to Communauté financière africaine ("African Financial Community"). The currency is issued by the Bank of Central African States (BEAC; Banque des États de l'Afrique Centrale), located in Yaoundé, Cameroon, for members of the Economic and Monetary Community of Central Africa (CEMAC; Communauté économique et monétaire de l'Afrique centrale). Although the franc is officially divided into 100 centimes, no centime-denominated coins have been issued. Since 1945, the Bank of France has been producing CFA franc notes in Chamalières.

In several west African states, the West African CFA franc, which is of equal value, is also in circulation.

== History ==
The CFA franc was introduced to the French colonies in Equatorial Africa in 1945, replacing the French Equatorial African franc. The Equatorial African colonies and territories using the CFA franc were Chad, French Cameroun, French Congo, Gabon and Ubangi-Shari.

The currency remained in use when these territories gained their independence and in 1961 its use was extended when part of British Cameroon transferred to the Federal Republic of Cameroon. Equatorial Guinea, the only former Spanish colony in the zone, adopted the CFA franc in 1984, replacing the Equatorial Guinean ekwele at a rate of 1 franc = 4 bipkwele.

The currency was pegged to the French franc (F) at F.CFA 1 = 2 French francs from 1948, becoming F.CFA 1 = NF 0.02 after introduction of the new franc at 1 new franc = 100 old francs. In 1994 the currency was devalued by half to F.CFA 1 = F 0.01. From 1999 it has since been pegged to the euro at €1 = F 6.55957 = F.CFA 655.957.

On April 25, 2023, the ministerial meeting of the Economic and Monetary Community of Central Africa (Cemac) and France was held. In particular, the subject of the CFA franc was discussed. On the French side, the guarantee provided to the CFA franc, and the assurance of its convertibility, is perceived as a vector of economic stability for the region. France remains “open” and “available” to move forward on a reform of monetary cooperation in Central Africa, such as it has been able to take place in West Africa. France says it is ready to receive CEMAC's proposals.

== Activism in Africa ==
The NGO "Panafrican Emergency" is organizing a conference in Libreville, Gabon, in June 2025 to discuss the CFA franc and relations between France and Africa.

== Criticism ==
According to the BBC, "critics, such as those leading the anti-CFA movement, say true economic development for the 14 African countries can only be achieved if they get rid of the currency. They argue that in exchange for the guarantees provided by the French treasury, African countries channel more money to France than they receive in aid. They also argue that they have no say in deciding key monetary policies agreed to by European countries, which are members of the Eurozone."

== Coins ==
In 1948, coins were issued for use in all the colonies (not including French Cameroun) in denominations of 1 and 2 francs. This was the last issue of a 2 franc coin for nearly 50 years. In 1958, 5, 10, and 25 franc coins were added, which were also used in French Cameroun. These bore the name Cameroun in addition to États de l'Afrique Equatoriale. In 1961, nickel 50 franc coins were introduced, followed by nickel 100 franc pieces in 1966.

From 1971, the 100 franc coins were issued for each of the individual member states, depicting the state name in which they were issued. 50 franc coins were also issued in this manner between 1976 and 1996, after being reduced in size. However instead of depicting the state name each was given an identification letter on the top reverse. 50 franc coins with the letter "A" were issued for Chad, "B" for Central African Republic, "C" for Congo, "D" for Gabon, and "E" for Cameroon. In 1976, cupro-nickel 500 franc coins were introduced. From 1985, these were also issued by the individual states. That year also saw the introduction of 5, 25, 50 and 100 franc coins for use in Equatorial Guinea, which had recently joined the monetary union, depicting all titles and information in Spanish instead of the usual French, most notably the denomination as "franco" instead of "franc". Despite titular differences in some of the coinage, all were legal and exchangeable tender in all member nations.

In 1996, centralized production of the 100 franc coin was resumed, with a single 500 franc coin reintroduced in 1998. Despite dropping state names and code letters, the overall design of the coins remained relatively unchanged.

2006 saw a redesign of all denominations of coins for the CFA franc, along with the introduction of a 2 franc piece. The 1, 5, 10, and 25 franc coins were reduced in size, while a new bi-metallic 100 franc coin was introduced, along with a new and reduced size 500 franc coin with heightened security features, including laser marking. All newer coins depict the acronym "CEMAC" for "Communauté Économique et Monétaire de l'Afrique Centrale". Older sized coins continue to remain legal tender alongside the newly configured coins.

A new series of coins was introduced in April 2025, including a new bimetallic 200-franc coin, a trimetallic 500-franc coin, and other redesigns.

All CFA coins depict both a mint mark, along with an engraver's privy mark. The mint mark is located on the reverse on the left side of the denomination while the engraver's mark is located on the right.

Coins of the Central African CFA franc (2006 series)
Image	Value	Technical parameters				Description			Date of first minting
Image	Value	Diameter	Thickness	Mass	Composition	Edge	Obverse	Reverse	Date of first minting
	1 franc	14.94 mm	1.39 mm	1.65 grams	Stainless steel	Smooth	Numeral "1"; legend "BANQUE DES ÉTATS DE L'AFRIQUE CENTRALE" and "1 FCFA"	Denomination above agricultural products (two shrubs of cacao and cassava); legend "CEMAC"	2006
	2 francs	18 mm	1.4 mm	2.45 grams	Stainless steel	Smooth	Numeral "2"; legend "BANQUE DES ÉTATS DE L'AFRIQUE CENTRALE" and "2 FCFA"	Denomination above agricultural products (two shrubs of cacao and cassava); legend "CEMAC"	2006
	5 francs	15.9 mm	1.65 mm	2.41 grams	Brass	Smooth	Numeral "5"; legend "BANQUE DES ÉTATS DE L'AFRIQUE CENTRALE" and "5 FCFA"	Denomination above agricultural products (two shrubs of cacao and cassava); legend "CEMAC"	2006
	10 francs	18 mm	1.67 mm	3 grams	Brass	Reeded	Numeral "10"; legend "BANQUE DES ÉTATS DE L'AFRIQUE CENTRALE" and "10 FCFA"	Denomination above agricultural products (two shrubs of cacao and cassava); legend "CEMAC"	2006
	25 francs	22.75 mm	1.55 mm	4.2 grams	Brass	Reeded	Numeral "25"; legend "BANQUE DES ÉTATS DE L'AFRIQUE CENTRALE" and "25 FCFA"	Denomination above agricultural products (two shrubs of cacao and cassava); legend "CEMAC"	2006
	50 francs	22 mm	1.93 mm	5 grams	Stainless steel	Indented	Numeral "50"; legend "BANQUE DES ÉTATS DE L'AFRIQUE CENTRALE" and "50 FCFA"	Denomination above agricultural products (two shrubs of cacao and cassava); legend "CEMAC"	2006
	100 francs	24 mm	2 mm	6 grams	Bi-metallic (Stainless steel center plug with a brass outer ring)	Reeded	Numeral "100"; legend "BANQUE DES ÉTATS DE L'AFRIQUE CENTRALE" and "100 FCFA"	Denomination above agricultural products (two shrubs of cacao and cassava); legend "CEMAC"	2006
	500 francs	26 mm	2.03 mm	8 grams	Copper-nickel	Lettered (5 sets of 15 reeds and the non-aligned acronym "CEMAC" (Economic and Monetary Community of Central Africa) repeated 8 times alternatively up and down)	Numeral "500"; legend "BANQUE DES ÉTATS DE L'AFRIQUE CENTRALE" and "500 FCFA"	Denomination above agricultural products (two shrubs of cacao and cassava); legend "CEMAC"	2006

== Banknotes ==
When the CFA franc was introduced, the Caisse Centrale de la France d'Outre-Mer issued notes in denominations of 5, 10, 20, 100, and 1,000 francs. In 1947, a new series of notes was introduced for use in French Equatorial Africa, although the notes did not bear the name of the colonies. Notes were issued in denominations of 5, 10, 20, 50, 100, and 1,000 francs, followed by those of 500 francs in 1949, and 5,000 francs in 1952. In 1957, the Institut d'Émission de l'Afrique Équatoriale Française et du Cameroun took over paper money production, issuing all of the earlier denominations except for the 500-franc note.

In 1961, the Banque Centrale des États de l'Afrique Équatoriale et du Cameroun took over banknote production, with notes below 100 francs ceasing to be issued. The name of the bank changed to Banque Centrale des États de l'Afrique Équatoriale in 1963. 10,000 franc notes were introduced in 1968, whilst the 10 franc notes were replaced by coins in 1971.

In 1975, the bank name changed again to the Banque des États de l'Afrique Centrale and the individual states began issuing notes in their own names, in denominations of 500, 1,000, 5,000 and 10,000 francs. This practice ended in 1993. Since then, the banknotes have been issued with only a letter prominently displayed to distinguish between the issues of the different states. 2,000 franc notes were introduced in 1993. The country letter codes are as follows:

1993 series:

- C – Republic of the Congo
- E – Cameroon
- F – Central African Republic
- L – Gabon
- N – Equatorial Guinea
- P – Chad

2002 series:

- A – Gabon
- C – Chad
- F – Equatorial Guinea
- M – Central African Republic
- T – Republic of the Congo
- U – Cameroon

Banknotes of the Central African CFA franc (1993-1994 issue)
Image	Value	Obverse	Reverse	Remark
	500 francs	Zebus; man	Antelope	C (Republic of the Congo); E (Cameroon); F (Central African Republic); L (Gabon); N (Equatorial Guinea); P (Chad)
	1,000 francs	Coffee harvest; man	Raft	C (Republic of the Congo); E (Cameroon); F (Central African Republic); L (Gabon); N (Equatorial Guinea); P (Chad)
	2,000 francs	Tropical fruit; woman	Harbor scene	C (Republic of the Congo); E (Cameroon); F (Central African Republic); L (Gabon); N (Equatorial Guinea); P (Chad)
	5,000 francs	Oil rig workers	Cotton harvest	C (Republic of the Congo); E (Cameroon); F (Central African Republic); L (Gabon); N (Equatorial Guinea); P (Chad)
	10,000 francs	Building of the Bank of the Central African States; Yaoundé, Cameroon; woman	Fishery	C (Republic of the Congo); E (Cameroon); F (Central African Republic); L (Gabon); N (Equatorial Guinea); P (Chad)

Banknotes of the Central African CFA franc (2002 issue)
Image	Value	Obverse	Reverse	Remark
	500 francs	Classroom scene, with students learning about the French letter B	Woman; huts	A (Gabon); C (Chad); F (Equatorial Guinea); M (Central African Republic); T (Republic of the Congo); U (Cameroon)
	1,000 francs	Logging; man	Fieldwork	A (Gabon); C (Chad); F (Equatorial Guinea); M (Central African Republic); T (Republic of the Congo); U (Cameroon)
	2,000 francs	Hydroelectric dam; girl	Mining scene	A (Gabon); C (Chad); F (Equatorial Guinea); M (Central African Republic); T (Republic of the Congo); U (Cameroon)
	5,000 francs	Port; man	Oil pumping station	A (Gabon); C (Chad); F (Equatorial Guinea); M (Central African Republic); T (Republic of the Congo); U (Cameroon)
	10,000 francs	Building of the Bank of the Central African States; Yaoundé, Cameroon; woman	Transport and communication	A (Gabon); C (Chad); F (Equatorial Guinea); M (Central African Republic); T (Republic of the Congo); U (Cameroon)

Banknotes of the Central African CFA franc (2022 issue)
Image	Value	Obverse	Reverse	Remark
	500 francs	Building of the Bank of the Central African States; Yaoundé, Cameroon	The primary colours are gray, yellow, blue, green, and orange. The central theme of this note is modern agriculture. Security features include a solid security thread with CEMAC, a watermark (three eland antelope heads), and electrotype 500	A (Gabon); C (Chad); F (Equatorial Guinea); M (Central African Republic); T (Republic of the Congo); U (Cameroon)
	1,000 francs	Building of the Bank of the Central African States; Yaoundé, Cameroon	The main colours are blue, yellow, red, green, and brown. The main theme of this note is health care. Security features include a solid security thread with CEMAC, a watermark (three eland antelope heads), and electrotype 1000.	A (Gabon); C (Chad); F (Equatorial Guinea); M (Central African Republic); T (Republic of the Congo); U (Cameroon)
	2,000 francs	Building of the Bank of the Central African States; Yaoundé, Cameroon	Red, yellow, green, and gray are the main colours in this note. The theme of this note is environmental protection and fauna. Security features include Silkscreen OVI® green-to-blue stars, a Dualtrack™ color-changing windowed security thread with demetalized BEAC 2000, a watermark (three eland antelope heads), and electrotype 2000.	A (Gabon); C (Chad); F (Equatorial Guinea); M (Central African Republic); T (Republic of the Congo); U (Cameroon)
	5,000 francs	Building of the Bank of the Central African States; Yaoundé, Cameroon	The colour scheme here is green, yellow, red, brown, and gray. The primary theme on the back side is environmental protection and fauna. Security features include SPARK Live® gold-to-green with Truspin® effect stars; a RAPID® windowed security thread with BEAC 5000; a watermark (three eland antelope heads); and electrotype 5000.	A (Gabon); C (Chad); F (Equatorial Guinea); M (Central African Republic); T (Republic of the Congo); U (Cameroon)
	10,000 francs	Building of the Bank of the Central African States; Yaoundé, Cameroon	Purple, yellow, red, green, and orange are the main colours. The main theme on the back side is education. Security features include SPARK Live® magenta-to-green with Truspin® effect stars, a RAPID® windowed security thread with BEAC 10000, a watermark (three eland antelope heads), and electrotype 10000.	A (Gabon); C (Chad); F (Equatorial Guinea); M (Central African Republic); T (Republic of the Congo); U (Cameroon)

Current XAF exchange rates
From Google Finance:	AUD CAD CHF CNY EUR GBP HKD JPY USD XOF CDF NGN
From Yahoo! Finance:	AUD CAD CHF CNY EUR GBP HKD JPY USD XOF CDF NGN
From XE.com:	AUD CAD CHF CNY EUR GBP HKD JPY USD XOF CDF NGN
From OANDA:	AUD CAD CHF CNY EUR GBP HKD JPY USD XOF CDF NGN

== See also ==
- African Central Bank
- African and Malagasy Union (AMU)
- Council of Arab Economic Unity (CAEU)
- Economic Community of West African States
- French Equatorial African franc
- West African CFA franc

General:

- Monetary union
- Economy of Cameroon
- Economy of the Central African Republic
- Economy of Chad
- Economy of the Republic of the Congo
- Economy of Equatorial Guinea
- Economy of Gabon

Preceded by: French Equatorial African franc	Currency of French Equatorial Africa (Chad, Ubangi-Shari, French Congo, Gabon, French Cameroun); 1945 – 1960	Currency of Chad; 1960 –			Succeeded by: Current
Preceded by: French Equatorial African franc	Currency of French Equatorial Africa (Chad, Ubangi-Shari, French Congo, Gabon, French Cameroun); 1945 – 1960	Currency of Central African Republic; 1960 – 1965; Note: formerly Ubangi-Shari	Currency of Central African Empire; 1965 – 1979	Currency of Central African Republic; 1979 –	Succeeded by: Current
Preceded by: French Equatorial African franc	Currency of French Equatorial Africa (Chad, Ubangi-Shari, French Congo, Gabon, French Cameroun); 1945 – 1960	Currency of Republic of the Congo; 1960 – 1970; Note: formerly French Congo	Currency of People's Republic of the Congo; 1970 – 1992	Currency of Republic of the Congo; 1992 –	Succeeded by: Current
Preceded by: French Equatorial African franc	Currency of French Equatorial Africa (Chad, Ubangi-Shari, French Congo, Gabon, French Cameroun); 1945 – 1960	Currency of Gabon; 1960 –			Succeeded by: Current
Preceded by: French Equatorial African franc	Currency of French Equatorial Africa (Chad, Ubangi-Shari, French Congo, Gabon, French Cameroun); 1945 – 1960	Currency of Republic of Cameroon; 1 January 1960 – 1 October 1961	Currency of Federal Republic of Cameroon; 1 October 1961 –		Succeeded by: Current
Preceded by: British West African pound Note: Southern Cameroons joins independent Cameroon			Currency of Federal Republic of Cameroon; 1 October 1961 –		Succeeded by: Current
Preceded by: Equatorial Guinean ekwele Ratio: 1 CFA franc = 4 bipkwele	Currency of Equatorial Guinea; 1985 –				Succeeded by: Current
