= Eco (currency) =

Proposed currency of ECOWAS

West African CFA West African Monetary Zone ECOWAS only (Cabo Verde)

The eco is the name for the proposed common currency of the Economic Community of West African States (ECOWAS). Plans originally called for the West African Monetary Zone (WAMZ) states to introduce the currency first, which would eventually be merged with the euro-pegged CFA franc which is used by the French-speaking West African region within the West African Economic and Monetary Union (UEMOA). This would also enable the UEMOA states to gain complete fiscal and monetary independence from France. The UEMOA states have alternatively proposed to reform the CFA franc into the eco first, which could then be extended to all ECOWAS states.

The eco has been pushed back several times since the launch of the ECOWAS single currency project, with the fifth launch deadline set for July 2027.

== Ten criteria ==
The West African Monetary Institute (WAMI) set out ten convergence criteria that must be met for the eco to be implemented. These criteria are divided into four primary and six secondary criteria. Up to the fiscal year 2011, only Ghana has been able to meet all the primary criteria in any single fiscal year.

The four primary criteria to be achieved by each member country are:

- A single-digit inflation rate at the end of each year.
- A fiscal deficit of no more than 4% of the GDP.
- A central bank deficit-financing of no more than 10% of the previous year's tax revenues.
- Gross external reserves that can give import cover for a minimum of three months.

The six secondary criteria to be achieved by each member country are:

- Prohibition of new domestic default payments and liquidation of existing ones.
- Tax revenue should be equal to or greater than 20 percent of the GDP.
- Wage bill to tax revenue equal to or less than 35 percent.
- Public investment to tax revenue equal to or greater than 20 percent.
- A stable real exchange rate.
- A positive real interest rate.

== History of the currency ==
=== Before 2019 ===
The first formal references to a regional monetary union date to the 1993 revision of the ECOWAS Treaty. Articles 3 and 51 to 55 state the objective of establishing a common currency at the regional level.

In April 2000, five English-speaking countries (The Gambia, Ghana, Liberia, Nigeria, and Sierra Leone) and Guinea, signed the "Accra Declaration", formally launching the West African Monetary Zone (WAMZ). They committed to create a second monetary zone in the region (alongside the West African Economic and Monetary Union) by 2003, setting convergence criteria and agreeing on a common action plan. The introduction of this second currency was repeatedly postponed first to 2005, then to 2010. At a meeting of the Convergence Council of Ministers and Governors of West Africa on 25 May 2009, it was rescheduled again to 2015 due to the 2008 financial crisis. This meeting also established a plan to begin work to merge the two West African currencies; this was planned to be achieved by 2020.

In 2001, the West African Monetary Institute (WAMI) was set up with headquarters in Accra, Ghana. It is to be an interim organisation in preparation for the future West African Central Bank. Its function and organisation are inspired by the European Monetary Institute. Thus, WAMI is to provide a framework for central banks in the WAMZ to start the integration and begin preliminary preparations for the printing and minting of the physical money, just as EMI did before in the Eurozone before the introduction of the euro. The current director general is Dr. Olorunsola E. Olowofeso.

Recent assessments of member countries' efforts to meet the criteria are very bleak. The performance scorecard presented at the 2012 Annual Statutory Meetings of the WAMZ shows that GDP growth was projected to decline to 6.9% in 2012 from 8.7% in 2011. The convergence scale of the whole WAMZ area was also projected to go down from a score of 79.2% in 2011 to 62.5% in 2012; as no member met all the convergence criteria. The average annual inflation rate also increased from 11.6% in 2011 to 12.6% in 2012. The Director of Multilateral Surveillance ECOWAS Commission, Lassane Kabore, described the performance as "dismal", but he also affirmed the commitment of his commission to the establishment of the Eco.

In 2014, the Central Bank of Nigeria published a document announcing the benefits of the single currency, emphasizing the creation of a vast common economic space to stimulate trade and investment.

In February 2018, ECOWAS affirmed its intention to restart the process with an introduction in 2020, which is strictly impossible: it is therefore a declaration of intent. On 23 February 2018, according to the economist Jean-Joseph Boillot, no serious work on the technical aspects of this implementation has yet been undertaken, either at the university level or at the state level.

=== 2019 ===
On 29 June 2019, the leaders of the Economic Community of West African States (ECOWAS) formally adopted the name "eco" for their project of the single currency. The currency was planned to be introduced in 2020.

ECOWAS leaders met in Abuja on 21 December 2019, six months after adopting the name "eco" for the future single currency project. This meeting came after the meeting of the committee of finance ministers and governors of central banks of the community space in the Nigerian capital.

Quoted by the Nigerian press agency NAN, the chair of the ministerial committee said that only Togo, among the ECOWAS countries, would meet the main requirements or criteria for the adoption of a single currency. These criteria include convergence, the flexible exchange rate regime, the fight against insecurity, and interstate collaboration.

On 21 December 2019, Ivorian President Alassane Ouattara announced that the West African CFA franc would be reformed, including renaming it the eco. France will no longer manage the currency, but the Banque de France will remain the guarantor of the convertibility between the eco and the euro with which it will keep a fixed parity. It was expected that its implementation would take place by the end of 2020.

On 22 December 2019, the managing director of the International Monetary Fund (IMF) welcomed the major reform of the CFA franc decided by eight West African countries and France. For Kristalina Georgieva, these changes "constitute a key step in the modernization of long-standing arrangements between the West African Economic and Monetary Union and France".

In December 2019, the President of Equatorial Guinea, Teodoro Obiang Nguema, visited Abidjan in Ivory Coast. During the press point after this meeting between the two heads of state, Alassane Ouattara and Teodoro Obiang Nguema, the two heads of state also discussed the reform of the West African CFA franc. The Equatorial Guinean president said he would like to see the same reform for the Central African CFA franc, which he deemed "obsolete".

On 29 December 2019, the president of Ghana expressed his desire to adopt the new eco to replace the West African CFA franc.

=== 2020 ===
In January 2020, according to several articles citing local media, Nigeria would require five "non-negotiable terms" before joining the single currency. Some particularly mention the deposits in the French Treasury of part of the foreign exchange reserves of the future common currency. On this point, the end of this guarantee is already mentioned in the reform proposed on 21 December. Still, according to the Nigerian press, Abuja would also require the management of the eco by the ECOWAS itself, without forgetting its impression in Africa and not in France.

Sierra Leone announced on Thursday 9 January 2020 it would decide on the future ECOWAS single currency, Eco, very soon. The Bank of Sierra Leone (BSL) announced on Thursday 9 January 2020 that the country will continue with Leone as its legal tender until the meeting of the Board of Governors of ECOWAS scheduled for 16 January 2020.

On 14 January 2020, the central banks of the ECOWAS sub-region began an extraordinary general assembly to deliberate on questions relating to the introduction of the single currency, the ECO, scheduled for 2020. The committee of central bank governors is also expected to discuss the implications of the recent announcement by French-speaking ECOWAS countries on the proposal to introduce the single currency eco to replace the CFA franc. The talks will also determine the way forward for the member states of the West African Monetary Zone (WAMZ) in accordance with the roadmap for the introduction of the single currency — the CEE. The ECOWAS technical team, however, is expected to present proposals made by the West African Monetary Institute regarding the CEE. The governors should also send their recommendations to the region's heads of state to find out if the region is ready for the introduction of the single currency.

On 16 January 2020, Nigeria and several West African countries, notably English-speaking ones, denounced in Abuja the decision to replace the CFA franc with the Eco, saying that it was "not in conformity" with the program recently adopted by the entire region to establish a single currency.

In all cases, the six countries of the West African Monetary Zone (WAMZ) "noted with concern the declaration aiming to unilaterally rename the CFA franc to eco by 2020", according to a press release issued after this extraordinary meeting between the various finance ministers and the governors of the central banks. WAMZ is made up of Nigeria, Ghana, Liberia, Sierra Leone, The Gambia and Guinea (Conakry), which is not part of the CFA zone. These countries consider that "this action is not in accordance with the decisions" of the Economic Community of West African States (ECOWAS) with a view to "adopting the eco as the name of the single currency" of the whole region.

They "reiterate the importance for all ECOWAS members to adhere to the decisions of the authority of the Heads of State and Government of ECOWAS concerning the implementation of the revised roadmap for the single currency program". A summit bringing together the heads of state of the WAMZ is planned "soon" to decide on the conduct to come, specifies the final communiqué.

Their 16 January statement also brought to light the battle for leadership between Côte d'Ivoire and Nigeria. In publicly criticizing the decision of the West African Economic and Monetary Union (Uemoa) to rename the CFA franc “eco” by 2020, the finance ministers and central bank governors of The Gambia, Ghana, Guinea, Liberia, Nigeria and Sierra Leone have not only revealed the divisions of ECOWAS.

On 31 January 2020, Ivorian President Alassane Ouattara clarified the alleged rejection of the eco by the 7 countries of the West African Monetary Zone (WAMZ). "There are only five countries that ended up in Abuja out of the fifteen of the Economic Community of West African States [ECOWAS]", he fumed, cutting the grass under his feet CFA anti-Francs, many of them shouting “white cap and white cap”.

"The majority of countries did not attend this meeting. It was not a meeting of heads of state, but of ministers and governors", said Ouattara. "What we decided at the level of heads of state, our will is to bring the eco in 2020", on the basis, he insists, of "conditions".

The first condition is to meet the 5 performance criteria: deficit of less than 3%, debt of less than 70%, low inflation, etc. (...). For the moment, there are only four or five countries, including Côte d'Ivoire, that meet these criteria", he added, stressing that the process should be "gradual". "Five, eight, ten countries [meeting the criteria] can come together", he said, adding that others could then join them like the eurozone started at eleven and which includes twenty countries today.

“We want to do it in stages. We do not want haste, but we also do not want countries that do not meet the convergence criteria to shake up the process", he concluded.

In February 2020, the Nigerian foreign minister revealed that the meeting attended by President Muhammadu Buhari and chaired by the President of ECOWAS, President Mahamadou Issoufou of Niger, also discussed the new single currency of West Africa, the CEE.

On this specific point, Minister Onyeama announced that "Nothing has changed with regard to the position of Nigeria". He explained that, according to Nigeria, the convergence criteria are not met by the majority of countries and that it is therefore necessary to extend the deadline for the launch of the ECOWAS single currency.

In February 2020, an extraordinary summit of the Economic Community of West African States (ECOWAS) took place. Many points were raised. In particular, the establishment of the single currency (Eco).

On the single currency, the final communiqué which sanctioned this meeting mentions that the Conference of Heads of State and Government of the subregional organization is satisfied with the important developments initiated by the West African Economic and Monetary Union (Uemoa) in the creation of the single currency. "The Conference was informed by Alassane Ouattara, President of the Republic of Côte d'Ivoire, President of the Conference of Heads of State of Uemoa on the reform of the CFA franc. This reform is a step towards achieving the establishment of the eco as provided for in the road map adopted by the Conference of Heads of State of ECOWAS. The Conference expressed satisfaction with these important developments and the insights provided by the president of the Conference of Heads of State of Uemoa on this issue", read the press release.

On 17 February 2020, the West African Economic and Monetary Union (Uemoa, eight countries) was published and its planned extension to the entire Economic Community of African States (Cedeao, 15 countries). Entitled Entry into the Era of Eco: Implications of Reform in West Africa, it aims to address the uncertainties arisen from the announcement of this substitution by Presidents Ouattara and Macron on 21 December 2019. The first conclusion is that the parity maintained with the euro and France's unlimited guarantee of convertibility will maintain confidence in the new currency. This guarantee helped to contain inflation from 2000 to 2019 at an average of 2% in the Uemoa region, compared with almost 10% in Cedeao and about 16% in sub-Saharan Africa. "No immediate effect" on the sovereign rating of the states, the end of the deposit of half of the exchange reserves of the Member States of the Union with the French Treasury does not worry S&P, because the fixed exchange rate is maintained. "That is why we believe that this reform should not have an immediate effect on our sovereign ratings", the authors conclude. In other words, investors don't have to worry at the moment. The second conclusion is that the project to extend the eco to the fifteen members of the Cedeao seems a long way off. "Material barriers remain, which leads us to consider this project unlikely in the medium term", the report says. Firstly, because of Nigeria's weight, and because Nigeria accounts for two-thirds of Cedeao's GDP and three times more than Uemoa's. But also because of its protectionist policies, says the report: "Accepting a common monetary policy between Nigeria and its Cedeao partners therefore seems difficult, especially since Nigeria has recently decided to close its borders with Benin and Niger to reduce smuggling and support local agricultural production. An extension beyond France's Uemoa guarantee would also require the approval of the Council of the European Union after consultation with the European Central Bank, which is not automatic. Finally, the adoption of a flexible exchange rate regime desired by Cedeao would increase the significant risks in terms of monetary shocks for Uemoa economies, particularly those that have increased their use of foreign currency borrowing in recent years." says S&P, recalling the conclusion of one of its 2017 reports on the dangers of devaluation: in the event of a currency crisis and without the French guarantee, Côte d'Ivoire, Senegal and Togo, which borrowed heavily, especially in form Eurobonds, see their debt heavily set up and S-P would be forced to lower their ratings. The report concludes with the recommendation to sharply improve tax revenues and a warning: "Whatever exchange rate regime Uemoa members choose, whether it is the maintenance of the euro, the option of a basket of currency (...) or a floating rate of exchange rate, fiscal discipline and strong economic policy will be all the more important for the economic stability of the monetary union."

On 20 May 2020, the Council of Ministers of the French Republic adopted a bill according to which the Central Bank of West African States, the central bank managing the currency of the eight nations of the West African Economic and Monetary Union which use the West African CFA franc, will no longer be required to deposit half of its exchange reserves with the Public Treasury of France. Furthermore, the French government will withdraw from all governing bodies of the Central Bank of West African States; until now, both the Minister of Finance of France and the governor of the Bank of France participated in the biannual meetings of the Central Bank, one of which took place in Paris. Both houses of the French legislature, the National Assembly and the Senate, must approve the bill for its provisions to come into force. Subsequent to ratification, the eco is expected to come into use in July 2020. It remains for the nations who have proposed to adopt the single currency, whether to continue using the name ‘eco.’ France will guarantee a fixed exchange rate of 1 euro to 655.96 West African CFA francs, though this arrangement is likely to change after the introduction of the new currency.

The second step towards the disappearance of the CFA franc and its replacement by a single currency called Eco, the French Parliament should adopt before the end of the third quarter the bill initialed on 20 May 2020 in the Council of Ministers and intended to ratify the agreement of monetary cooperation concluded in Abidjan on 21 December 2019 with the governments of the member states of the West African Monetary Union (Umoa).

Given that a law on the reform of the eco only passes to the French parliament until the end of September 2020, the agreement to adopt the eco does not risk doing this before October 2020.

In September 2020, Alassane Ouattara, President of Côte d'Ivoire, announced the decision of the 57th ordinary session of the Conference of Heads of State and Government of ECOWAS to proceed with the implementation of the eco "within three to five years."

=== 2021 ===
In June 2021, The Heads of State of the Economic Community of West African States (ECOWAS) adopted a roadmap for the launch of the common currency "Eco" in 2027, announces the final press release of the 59th ordinary session of the Assembly of Heads of State and Government of ECOWAS.

=== 2023 ===
In September 2023, the Economic Community of West African States (ECOWAS) reiterated its commitment to launch the common eco currency by 2027. The ECOWAS Commission says it would do everything possible to ensure that the processes and programs outlined in the roadmap for the launch of the common eco currency remain on track and on schedule. The commission will accelerate the establishment of the West African Central Bank and other relevant bodies necessary for the success of monetary integration in the sub-region.

=== 2024 ===
In July 2024, during the summit of the Economic Community of West African States (ECOWAS), as part of the implementation of the eco by ECOWAS, Member States emphasized the importance for Member States to regularly transmit their Multiannual Convergence Programs.

In December 2024, ECOWAS adopted the criteria for selecting candidate Member States for the launch of the ECO. ECOWAS also mandated the ECOWAS Commission, in collaboration with the West African Monetary Agency (WAMA), to integrate these criteria into the Protocol on Monetary Union. The committee's proposals for financing the reforms necessary for the launch of the eco were also approved.

=== 2025 ===
On 3 March 2025, the ECOWAS Commission brought together the Ministers of Finance and Governors of Central Banks of Member States for the 11th meeting of the Convergence Council, the main objective of which was to assess the progress of the Roadmap for the launch of the ECO, the future regional single currency.

On August 4 in Banjul, ECOWAS announced that the eco would be introduced on July 1, 2027.

=== 2026 ===
On 7 September 2026, the ECOWAS Commission convened the 14th meeting of the Convergence Council. Assessing the progress on the requirements for the launch of the new currency, the meeting noted that "launching the ECO in 2027 remains achievable".

== See also ==
- Economic integration of West African States
- African Monetary Union
- African Central Bank
- Economic Community of Central African States
- CFA franc
- West African CFA franc
- Central African CFA franc
- East African shilling
- Council of Arab Economic Unity (CAEU)
- Arab Maghreb Union
