= Comprehensive and Progressive Agreement for Trans-Pacific Partnership =

Multilateral free trade agreement

- Member states
- Type: Free Trade Agreement and Economic Integration Agreement
- Signed: 8 March 2018
- Location: Santiago, Chile
- Sealed: 23 January 2018
- Effective: 30 December 2018
- Condition: 60 days after ratification by 50% of the signatories, or after six signatories have ratified
- Parties: 12; Australia; Brunei; Canada; Chile; Japan; Malaysia; Mexico; New Zealand; Peru; Singapore; United Kingdom; Vietnam
- Depositary: Government of New Zealand
- Languages: English; French; Spanish

The Comprehensive and Progressive Agreement for Trans-Pacific Partnership (CPTPP), previously proposed as the TPP11 is a multilateral trade agreement that consists of twelve members states, spans over five continents and covers nearly 600 million people.

The twelve members have combined economies representing 14.4% of global gross domestic product, at approximately US$15.8 trillion, making the CPTPP the world's fourth largest free trade area by GDP, behind the United States–Mexico–Canada Agreement, the European single market, and the Regional Comprehensive Economic Partnership. While originally only involving Pacific Rim countries, it has since evolved to also include outside countries.

== History ==
=== Trans-Pacific Partnership ===
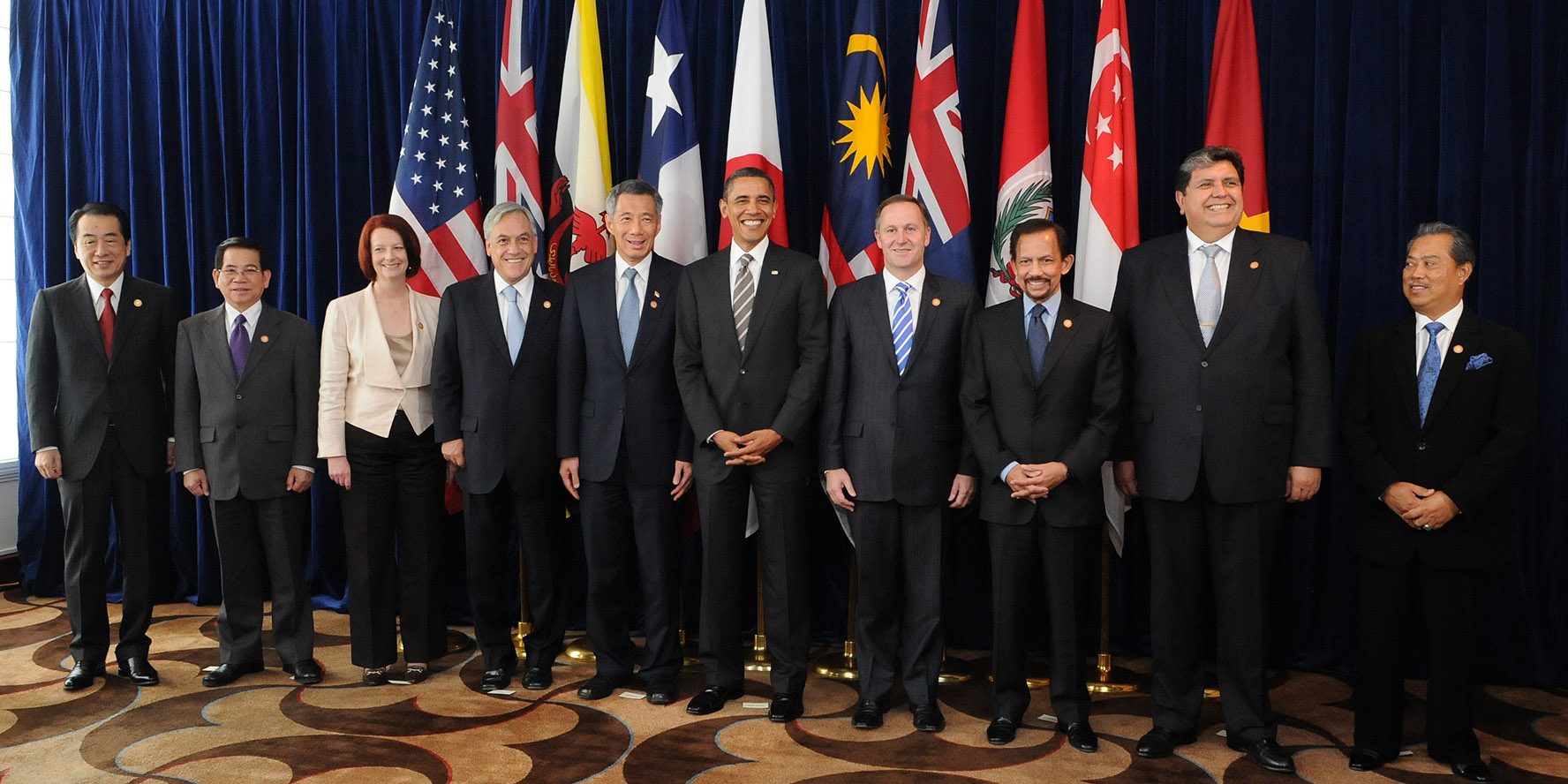

The CPTPP evolved from the Trans-Pacific Partnership (TPP) abbreviated as TPP11 or TPP-11, an agreement which was never ratified due to the withdrawal of the United States.

The TPP had been signed on 4 February 2016 but never entered into force, as the U.S. withdrew from the agreement soon after the election of President Donald Trump. All other TPP signatories agreed in May 2017 to revive the agreement, with Shinzo Abe's administration in Japan widely reported as taking the leading role in place of the U.S.

=== Establishment of the CPTPP ===
In January 2018, the CPTPP was created as a succeeding agreement, retaining two-thirds of its predecessor's provisions; 22 measures favored by the U.S. but contested by other signatories were suspended, while the threshold for enactment was lowered so as not to require U.S. accession.

The agreement to establish the CPTPP was signed on 8 March 2018 by Australia, Brunei, Canada, Chile, Japan, Malaysia, Mexico, New Zealand, Peru, Singapore, and Vietnam, with the ceremony held in Santiago, Chile. The agreement specifies that its provisions enter into effect 60 days after ratification by at least half the signatories (six of the eleven participating countries). On 31 October 2018, Australia was the sixth nation to ratify the agreement; it subsequently came into force for the initial six ratifying countries on 30 December 2018.

== Negotiations ==
During the round of negotiations held concurrently with the Asia-Pacific Economic Cooperation forum in Vietnam in November 2017, the Canadian prime minister Justin Trudeau refused to sign the agreement in principle, stating reservations about the provisions on culture and automotives. Media outlets in Australia, New Zealand, and Japan, which strongly supported quick movement on a deal, strongly criticized what they portrayed as Canadian sabotage.

Canada insisted that cultural and language rights, specifically related to its French-speaking minority, be protected.

However, Canada's major reservation was a conflict between the percentage of a vehicle that must originate in a CPTPP member nation to enter tariff-free, which was 45% under the original TPP language and 62.5% under the NAFTA agreement. Japan, which is a major automobile part exporter, strongly supported lower requirements. In January 2018, Canada announced that it would sign the CPTPP after obtaining binding side letters on culture with every other CPTPP member country, as well as bilateral agreements with Japan, Malaysia, and Australia related to non-tariff barriers. Canada's Auto Parts Manufacturers' Association sharply criticized increasing the percentages of automobile parts that may be imported tariff-free, noting that the United States was moving in the opposite direction by demanding stricter importation standards in the NAFTA renegotiation, later USMCA.

In February 2019, Canada's Jim Carr, Minister of International Trade Diversification, delivered a keynote address at a seminar concerning CPTPP - Expanding Your Business Horizons, reaching out to businesses stating the utilisation of the agreement provides a bridge that will enable people, goods and services to be shared more easily.

== Chapters ==
=== TPP modification and incorporation ===
The Comprehensive and Progressive Agreement for Trans-Pacific Partnership (CPTPP) incorporates most of the provisions of the abandoned Trans-Pacific Partnership (TPP) agreement, using mutatis mutandis. Several clauses within Article 30 of the TPP were suspended for the CPTPP, including:

- Accession (30.4)
- Entry into Force (30.5)
- Withdrawal (30.6)
- Authentic Texts (30.8).

The final text of CPTPP was mostly identical to the original TPP, except for some provisions advanced by the United States under the TPP, but not supported by the other members. In the intellectual property chapter, copyright and patent terms were shortened relative to TPP, and standards for digital IP protections were eliminated. Provisions allowing use of investor–state dispute settlements for investment agreements and authorizations were also rescinded. In summary, the CPTPP amends aspects of the following TPP chapters:

- Chapter 9: Investment
- Chapter 10: Cross-Border Trade in Services
- Chapter 11: Financial Services
- Chapter 13: Telecommunications
- Chapter 15: Government Procurement
- Chapter 18: Intellectual Property
- Chapter 20: Environment
- Chapter 26: Transparency and Anti-Corruption.

=== CPTPP chapters ===
There are currently 30 chapters in the CPTPP Agreement listed below:

Amended TPP Chapters

No	Area	No	Area
Chapter 1	Initial Provisions and General Definitions	Chapter 16	Competition Policy
Chapter 2	National Treatment and Market Access for Goods	Chapter 17	State-Owned Enterprises and Designated Monopolies
Chapter 3	Rules of Origin and Origin Procedures	Chapter 18	Intellectual Property
Chapter 4	Textile and Apparel Goods	Chapter 19	Labour
Chapter 5	Customs Administration and Trade Facilitation	Chapter 20	Environment
Chapter 6	Trade Remedies	Chapter 21	Cooperation and Capacity Building
Chapter 7	Sanitary and Phytosanitary Measures	Chapter 22	Competitiveness and Business Facilitation
Chapter 8	Technical Barriers to Trade	Chapter 23	Development
Chapter 9	Investment	Chapter 24	Small and Medium-sized Enterprises
Chapter 10	Cross-Border Trade in Services	Chapter 25	Regulatory Coherence
Chapter 11	Financial Services	Chapter 26	Transparency and Anti-corruption
Chapter 12	Temporary Entry for Business Persons	Chapter 27	Administrative and Institutional Provisions
Chapter 13	Telecommunications	Chapter 28	Dispute Settlement
Chapter 14	Electronic Commerce	Chapter 28	Exceptions and General Provisions
Chapter 15	Government Procurement	Chapter 30	Final Provisions

==== Chapter 2: Goods ====
The chapter on goods requires the elimination of most tariffs between members and the final elimination of approx 99% of tariff lines.

==== Chapter 14: E-commerce ====
The e-commerce chapter of the CPTPP mandates that signatories adopt or at the very least maintain laws for consumer protection with the aim to fight fraud and deceptive commercial activities.

==== Chapter 17: State Owned Enterprise ====
The chapter on state-owned enterprises (SOEs) requires signatories to share information about SOEs with each other, with the intent of engaging with the issue of state intervention in markets. It includes the most detailed standards for intellectual property of any trade agreement, as well as protections against Intellectual property infringement against corporations operating abroad.

== Membership ==
=== Legislative process ===
An overview of the legislative process in selected states is shown below:

Signatory	Signature	Institution	Conclusion date	In favour	Against	AB	Deposited	Effective	Ref.
Mexico	8 March 2018	Senate	24 April 2018	73	24		28 June 2018	30 December 2018	
Mexico	8 March 2018	Presidential Assent	21 May 2018	Granted			28 June 2018	30 December 2018	
Japan	8 March 2018	House of Representatives	18 May 2018	Majority approval (Standing vote)			6 July 2018	30 December 2018	
Japan	8 March 2018	House of Councillors	13 June 2018	168	69		6 July 2018	30 December 2018	
Singapore	8 March 2018	No parliamentary approval required					19 July 2018	30 December 2018	
New Zealand	8 March 2018	House of Representatives	24 October 2018	111	8		25 October 2018	30 December 2018	
New Zealand	8 March 2018	Royal assent	25 October 2018	Granted			25 October 2018	30 December 2018	
Canada	8 March 2018	House of Commons	16 October 2018	236	44	1	29 October 2018	30 December 2018	
Canada	8 March 2018	Senate	25 October 2018	Majority approval (Voice vote)			29 October 2018	30 December 2018	
Canada	8 March 2018	Royal assent	25 October 2018	Granted			29 October 2018	30 December 2018	
Australia	8 March 2018	House of Representatives	19 September 2018	Majority approval (Standing vote)			31 October 2018	30 December 2018	
Australia	8 March 2018	Senate	17 October 2018	33	15		31 October 2018	30 December 2018	
Australia	8 March 2018	Royal assent	19 October 2018	Granted			31 October 2018	30 December 2018	
Vietnam	8 March 2018	National Assembly	12 November 2018	469	0	16	15 November 2018	14 January 2019	
Peru	8 March 2018	Congress	14 July 2021	97	0	9	21 July 2021	19 September 2021	
Malaysia	8 March 2018	Cabinet of Malaysia					30 September 2022	29 November 2022	
Chile	8 March 2018	Chamber of Deputies	17 April 2019	77	68	2	23 December 2022	21 February 2023	
Chile	8 March 2018	Senate	11 October 2022	27	10	1	23 December 2022	21 February 2023	
Brunei	8 March 2018	No parliamentary approval required					13 May 2023	12 July 2023	
United Kingdom	16 July 2023	House of Lords	23 January 2024	Majority approval (Voice vote)			17 May 2024	15 December 2024	
United Kingdom	16 July 2023	House of Commons	19 March 2024	Majority approval (Voice vote)			17 May 2024	15 December 2024	
United Kingdom	16 July 2023	Royal assent	20 March 2024	Granted			17 May 2024	15 December 2024	

==== Ratifications ====
On 28 June 2018, Mexico became the first country to finish its domestic ratification procedure of the CPTPP, with President Enrique Peña Nieto stating, "With this new generation agreement, Mexico diversifies its economic relations with the world and demonstrates its commitment to openness and free trade".

On 6 July 2018, Japan became the second country to ratify the agreement.

On 19 July 2018, Singapore became the third country to ratify the agreement and deposit its instrument of ratification.

On 17 October 2018, the Australian Federal Parliament passed relevant legislation through the Senate. The official ratification was deposited on 31 October 2018. This two-week gap made Australia the sixth signatory to deposit its ratification of the agreement, and it came into force 60 days later.

On 25 October 2018, New Zealand ratified the CPTPP, increasing the number of countries that had formally ratified the agreement to four.

Also on 25 October 2018, Canada passed and was granted royal assent on the enabling legislation. The official ratification was deposited on 29 October 2018.

On 2 November 2018, the CPTPP and related documents were submitted to the National Assembly of Vietnam for ratification. On 12 November 2018, the National Assembly passed a resolution unanimously ratifying the CPTPP. The Vietnamese government officially notified New Zealand of its ratification on 15 November 2018.

On 14 July 2021, the CPTPP was approved by the Congress of the Republic of Peru. The official ratification was deposited on 21 July 2021.

On 30 September 2022, Malaysia ratified the CPTPP and deposited its instrument of ratification.

On 17 April 2019, the CPTPP was approved by the Chamber of Deputies of Chile. The final round of approval in the Senate was scheduled for November 2019, after being approved by its Commission of Constitution. However, due to a series of massive protests against the government of Sebastián Piñera, the ratification process was paused. Only in 2022, the ratification process was resumed after a new Congress and a new President were elected. Despite the public opposition of Gabriel Boric to the treaty before his election as President, the new administration did not interfere in the voting. The CPTPP was approved in the Senate with 27 votes in favor (mainly from the right-wing opposition and some center-left politicians) and 10 against, mostly by members of the ruling coalition. The treaty was deposited on 23 December, once several side letters were negotiated with the other signatories in specific topics considered harmful by the Chilean government. On 23 February 2023, Boric ratified Chile's entry to TPP-11.

On 13 May 2023, Brunei ratified the CPTPP and deposited its instrument of ratification.

==== Entry into force ====
The agreement came into effect 60 days after ratification and deposit of accession documents by at least half the signatories (six of the eleven signatories). Australia was the sixth country to ratify the agreement, which was deposited with New Zealand on 31 October 2018, and consequently the agreement came into force between Australia, Canada, Japan, Mexico, New Zealand, and Singapore on 30 December 2018.

On 1 January 2019, Australia, Canada, Mexico, New Zealand, and Singapore implemented a second round of tariff cuts. Japan's second tariff cut took place on 1 April 2019.

On 15 November 2018, Vietnam deposited the accession documents, and the agreement entered into force in Vietnam on 14 January 2019.

On 21 July 2021, Peru deposited the accession documents, and the agreement entered into force in Peru on 19 September 2021.

On 30 September 2022, Malaysia deposited the accession documents, and the agreement entered into force in Malaysia on 29 November 2022.

On 23 December 2022, Chile deposited the accession documents, and the agreement entered into force in Chile on 21 February 2023.

On 13 May 2023, Brunei deposited the accession documents, and the agreement entered into force in Brunei on 12 July 2023.

==== Geographic scope ====
The CPTPP defines the "territory" of each party in Annex 1-A of Chapter 1 (Initial Provisions and General Definitions) of the agreement. These definitions outline the geographic areas to which the CPTPP applies, encompassing land territories, islands, internal waters, territorial seas, exclusive economic zones (EEZs), continental shelves, airspace, and other maritime areas where the party exercises sovereign rights or jurisdiction, consistent with international law, including the United Nations Convention on the Law of the Sea (UNCLOS).

A key aspect of these definitions is the explicit inclusion or exclusion of certain remote and offshore territories to ensure precise coverage for trade and economic activities. For example, Mexico's territory is defined to specifically include the remote Pacific islands of Guadalupe Island and the Revillagigedo Islands, along with any areas beyond the territorial seas where Mexico exercises sovereign rights or jurisdiction under international and domestic law. Australia's definition covers the mainland territory, airspace, territorial sea, contiguous zone and EEZ, and includes the Pacific territories of the Coral Sea Islands and Norfolk Island, as well as the Indian Ocean territories of Ashmore and Cartier Islands, Cocos (Keeling) Islands, Christmas Island and Heard Island and McDonald Islands. New Zealand's territory explicitly excludes Tokelau, a non-self-governing Polynesian territory of New Zealand which enjoys substantial self-administration, and which remains on the United Nations list of non-self-governing territories. Prior to the United Kingdom's CPTPP membership, the uninhabited Heard Island and McDonald Islands were the furthest removed CPTPP territory from the Pacific Ocean, as they are over 4,000 kilometers from the West Australian city of Perth.

== CPTPP Commission ==
The CPTPP Commission is the decision-making body of the CPTPP, which was established when the CPTPP entered into force on 30 December 2018. The official languages of CPTPP are English, French, and Spanish; English is used prevailing in the case of conflict or divergence. The CPTPP commission in 2025 is chaired by Australia.

CPTPP Commission meetings
No.	Year	Date	Host	City	Host leader
1	2019	19 January	Japan	Tokyo	Prime Minister Shinzo Abe
2	2019	9 October	New Zealand	Auckland	Prime Minister Jacinda Ardern
3	2020	5 August	Mexico	Virtual meeting	President Andrés Manuel López Obrador
4	2021	2 June	Japan	Virtual meeting	Prime Minister Yoshihide Suga
5	2021	1 September	Japan	Virtual meeting	Prime Minister Yoshihide Suga
6	2022	8 October	Singapore		Prime Minister Lee Hsien Loong
7	2023	16 July	New Zealand	Auckland	Prime Minister Chris Hipkins
8	2024	28 November	Canada	Vancouver	Prime Minister Justin Trudeau
9	2025	20–21 November	Australia	Melbourne	Prime Minister Anthony Albanese
10	2026	26 June	Vietnam	Virtual meeting	President Tô Lâm
11	2026	November	Vietnam	pending	President Tô Lâm

1st CPTPP Commission (2019)
Representatives from the eleven CPTPP signatories participated in the 1st CPTPP Commission meeting held in Tokyo on 19 January 2019, which decided:

- A decision about the chairing and administrative arrangements for the commission and special transitional arrangements for 2019;
- A decision to establish the accession process for interested economies to join the CPTPP; Annex
- A decision to create rules of procedure and a code of conduct for disputes involving Parties to the; Annex; Annex I
- A decision to create a code of conduct for investor-State dispute settlement.; Annex* Members of the CPTPP Commission also issued a joint ministerial statement on 19 January 2019.

2nd CPTPP Commission (2019)
The 2nd CPTPP Commission meeting was held on 9 October 2019 in Auckland, New Zealand. Alongside the commission, the following Committees met for the first time in Auckland: Trade in Goods; Rules of Origin; Agricultural Trade; Technical Barriers to Trade; Sanitary and Phytosanitary Measures; Small and Medium Sized Enterprises; State Owned Enterprises; Development; Cooperation and Capacity Building; Competitiveness and Business Facilitation; Environment; and the Labour Council. The Commission adopted two formal decisions, (i) on its Rules of Procedure under Article 27.4 and (ii) to establish a Roster of Panel Chairs as provided for under Article 28.11.

3rd CPTPP Commission (2020)
The 3rd CPTPP Commission meeting was held virtually and hosted by Mexico on 5 August 2020.

4th CPTPP Commission (2021)
The 4th CPTPP Commission meeting was held virtually and hosted by Japan on 2 June 2021. The Commission decided to move forward with the application of the United Kingdom as an aspirant economy.

5th CPTPP Commission (2021)
The 5th CPTPP Commission meeting was held virtually and hosted by Japan on 1 September 2021. The Commission decided to establish a Committee on Electronic Commerce composed of government representatives of each Party.

6th CPTPP Commission (2022)
The 6th CPTPP Commission meeting was held on 8 October 2022 and hosted by Singapore.

7th CPTPP Commission (2023)
The 7th CPTPP Commission meeting was held on 16 July 2023 in Auckland, New Zealand. The commission decided to establish a Committee on Customs Administration and Trade Facilitation. The meeting included the formal signing of the accession of the United Kingdom.

8th CPTPP Commission (2024)
The 8th CPTPP Commission meeting was held on 28 November 2024 in Vancouver, Canada. The Commission decided to move forward with the application of Costa Rica as an aspirant economy.

9th CPTPP Commission (2025)
The 9th CPTPP Commission meeting was held on from 20-21 November 2025 in Melbourne, Australia. On 20 November the commission planned to finish the negotiations and add Costa Rica by years end, and declared four other countries (Uruguay, the United Arab Emirates, the Philippines and Indonesia) as meeting the criteria to join the CPTPP. The commission decided to move forward with the application of Uruguay as an aspirant economy first before the end of the 2025 and then with the United Arab Emirates, the Philippines and Indonesia in 2026 if appropriate. A proposal from Vietnam for the establishment of a CPTPP support unit aimed at addressing resource constraints for the implementation of the agreement received unanimous support from all members.

At the meeting, a subgroup of member nations issued a document known as The Birrarung Statement. This specific statement was championed by Australia, New Zealand, Canada, Mexico, Singapore, and Chile. It was named after Melbourne's Yarra River (indigenously known as Birrarung) and represents a formal commitment to integrate Indigenous perspectives into the framework of international trade. It aimed to address the historic marginalization of indigenous peoples in global commerce. By signing the statement, the six nations agreed to explore ways to increase Indigenous participation in regional supply chains and to ensure that future trade policies are inclusive.

10th CPTPP Commission (2026)
The 10th CPTPP Commission meeting was held on 26 June 2026 and hosted by Vietnam. The commission decided to begin preparatory discussions with Indonesia, the Philippines and the United Arab Emirates.

== Member geography and demographics ==
With the exception of the United Kingdom, all current CPTPP states border the Pacific Ocean and its marginal seas. Canada, Chile, Malaysia, Mexico, Peru and Vietnam border it via the coasts of Asia or the Americas, whilst Australia, Brunei, Japan, New Zealand and Singapore are physically situated in the Pacific Basin (with Australia and Singapore also touching Indian Ocean waters). While not geographically considered a Pacific country, the United Kingdom has the overseas territory of the Pitcairn Islands, which is located roughly 2,000 kilometers west of Chile's Easter Island in the South Pacific. The CPTPP's membership overlaps with several major regional organisations; all members except the United Kingdom participate in the Asia-Pacific Economic Cooperation organization, while Chile, Mexico and Peru are also members of the Pacific Alliance, Australia and New Zealand are members of the Pacific Islands Forum, and Brunei, Malaysia, Singapore and Vietnam are members of ASEAN. Additionally, since 2013 Australia and Mexico have shared membership in MIKTA, a grouping of middle power countries which also includes Indonesia, South Korea and Turkey.

The twelve members are distributed across all four hemispheres. Australia, New Zealand, Chile and Peru are wholly in the Southern Hemisphere, while the other members are in the Northern Hemisphere. Australia, Brunei, Japan, Malaysia, Singapore, Vietnam and most of New Zealand are in the Eastern Hemisphere, while Canada, Chile, Mexico, Peru and most of the United Kingdom are in the Western Hemisphere.

The member states had a combined population of approximately 597.9 million in 2025. Mexico was the most populous member, with approximately 131 million inhabitants, followed by Japan at 123 million, Vietnam at 101 million and the United Kingdom at 69 million. Australia, Canada, Chile, Malaysia and Peru each had populations between approximately 19 million and 35 million, while New Zealand, Singapore and Brunei had populations of fewer than 6 million. By total land area, Canada and Australia are the largest countries in the CPTPP, however, they are also two of the least densely populated countries in the world, with very few people living in the deep interiors of the countries.

The member states vary considerably in age structure. In 2025, Japan had the highest median age among the CPTPP members, at approximately 49.8 years, followed by Canada at 40.6 years and the United Kingdom at 40.1 years. Australia and New Zealand had median ages of approximately 38.3 and 37.7 years respectively, while Chile and Singapore were at 36.9 and 36.2 years. Vietnam, Brunei, Malaysia and Peru had younger populations, with median ages of approximately 33.4, 32.7, 31.0 and 30.2 years respectively, while Mexico had the lowest median age among the members, at approximately 29.6 years. The unweighted mean of the twelve countries' median ages was approximately 36.4 years.

The members encompass a wide range of religious compositions. Christianity is the largest religious affiliation in Australia, Canada, Chile, Mexico, Peru and the United Kingdom, while Islam is predominant in Brunei and Malaysia. Japan and Singapore have substantial Buddhist populations, with Buddhism also constituting a significant religious affiliation in Malaysia and Vietnam. In Australia, Japan, New Zealand and Vietnam, large proportions of the population are classified as religiously unaffiliated. The majority of the population in New Zealand is not affiliated with any religion. Singapore is particularly religiously diverse, with significant Buddhist, Christian, Muslim, Hindu and unaffiliated populations and no single religious group constituting a clear majority.

== Enlargement ==
CPTPP rules require all twelve signatories to agree to the admission of additional members. Article 34 of CPTPP states that "any State or separate customs territory that is a member of APEC, and any other State or separate customs territory as the Parties may agree" are eligible to accede to the agreement.

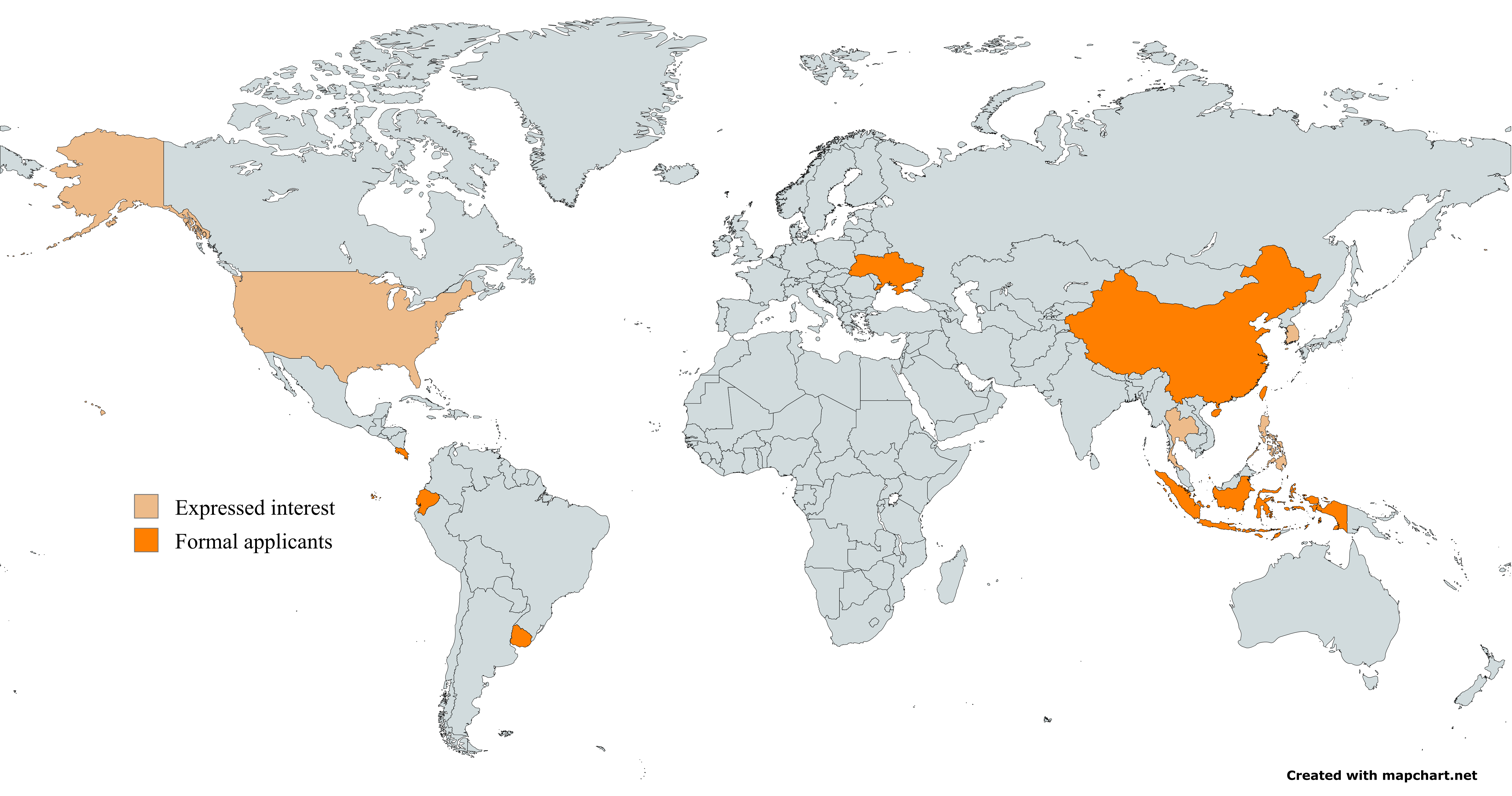

Current applicants

Country or region	Status	Application	Negotiations opened	Negotiations concluded	Signature	Ref.
Costa Rica	Gave up joining process	11 August 2022	28 November 2024	6 May 2026 (Note: After negative reception and a series of protests, President Laura Fernández discarded joining the CPTPP, fired the Minister of Foreign Trade, and requested to drop the congressional approval.)		
China	Formal application submitted	16 September 2021				
Taiwan	Formal application submitted under the name of "The Separate Customs Territory of Taiwan, Penghu, Kinmen and Matsu (TPKM)."	22 September 2021				
Ecuador	Formal application submitted	29 December 2021				
Uruguay	Invitation to join received	1 December 2022	21 November 2025			
Ukraine	Formal application submitted	5 May 2023				
Indonesia	Formal application submitted & begin preparatory discussion at 27 June 2026	19 September 2024				
Philippines	Formal application submitted & begin preparatory discussion at 27 June 2026	August 2025				
United Arab Emirates	Formal application submitted & begin preparatory discussion at 27 June 2026	August 2025				
Cambodia	Formal application submitted	December 2025				
Argentina	Formal application submitted	3 June 2026				

=== Applicants ===
==== Cambodia ====
On 17 June 2025, Cambodia created a government task force to study the feasibility of joining CPTPP. In December 2025, Nikkei Asia reported that Cambodia had submitted its application to join the CPTPP trade pact.

==== China ====
Chinese leaders have made aspirational statements about joining the TPP since 2013. In May 2020, Chinese Premier Li Keqiang said that China was willing to consider joining CPTPP. Meanwhile, General Secretary of the Chinese Communist Party Xi Jinping said at an Asia-Pacific Economic Cooperation (APEC) summit in November 2020 that China would "actively consider" joining CPTPP.

In December 2020, Japan Foreign Minister Toshimitsu Motegi has said that "TPP-11 sets high standards for regulations on e-commerce, intellectual property and state-owned enterprises", suggesting the amount of government intervention in the Chinese economy will not meet CPTPP requirements.

China's application to CPTPP is unlikely to gain traction. Although not a member of CPTPP, the U.S. can exercise the "poison pill" clause (Article 32.10) within the United States–Mexico–Canada Agreement to dissuade Canada and Mexico from voting in favour of the Chinese application.

On 16 September 2021, China formally applied to join CPTPP.

Japan Economy Minister Yasutoshi Nishimura was quoted by Reuters: "Japan believes that it's necessary to determine whether China, which submitted a request to join the TPP-11, is ready to meet its extremely high standards"; indicating that Japan would not support the Chinese application under the current circumstances.

Former Australian Trade Minister Dan Tehan indicated that Australia would oppose China's application until China halts trade strikes against Australian exports and resumes minister-to-minister contacts with the Australian government. Also, Australia has lodged disputes against China in the WTO on restrictions imposed by China on exports of barley and wine.

On 17 April 2026, it was reported that during a state visit to China by Vietnamese President Tô Lâm, Vietnam expressed its support for China’s accession.

==== Costa Rica ====
Costa Rica filed its application to join the CPTPP trade pact on 11 August 2022 as part of recently elected President Rodrigo Chaves Robles's strategy of strengthening trade with Asian economies. Costa Rica was invited on 28 November 2024 to begin accession talks by the CPTPP commission at its 8th meeting, an Accession Working Group for Costa Rica chaired by Peru and vice-chaired by Canada and New Zealand was created. On 28 April 2025, Japan and Costa Rica agreed to work together to support Costa Rica's bid to join the trade bloc. At the 9th CPTPP meeting on 20 November 2025 the commission planned to finish the negotiations and add Costa Rica by years end. Negotiations concluded 6 May 2026. However, on 28 October 2026, Rodrigo Chaves’ successor, President Laura Fernández, announced that the country had given up on joining the trade pact, following the negative reception from agricultural groups and producers, and a series of protests lead by these and other groups. In the same announcement, President Fernández fired Indiana Trejos Gallo, Minister of Foreign Trade, claiming that she failed to fulfill information requests regarding the pact.

==== Ecuador ====
Ecuador filed its application to join the CPTPP trade pact on 29 December 2021 as the country moves to reduce its reliance on oil and diversify its economy through exports.

==== Indonesia ====
Indonesia initially showed the least interest of three linked ASEAN members to apply to CPTPP, however continued to monitor the developments of the trade bloc, with Indonesian ambassador to the US Rosan Roeslani leaving the door open but clarifying that Indonesia was not in the process of applying to CPTPP at that time. In October 2023, Jakarta Globe reported that the primary reason for Indonesia's lack of interest in CPTPP was due to the government's policy of reducing imported goods in its public procurement in order to develop its domestic industry, which is incompatible with CPTPP requirements for members to eliminate over 98 percent of tariffs in the free trade area. In December 2023, Chief Economic Affairs Minister Airlangga Hartarto heavily discussed CPTPP with British Trade Envoy to Indonesia, Richard Graham; this meeting occurred a few months after the UK signed the accession protocols to join CPTPP. In April 2024, Hartarto conveyed Indonesia's interest in joining CPTPP to British Minister of State for Indo-Pacific Anne-Marie Trevelyan during a meeting in London; Trevelyan emphasised that the UK supported Indonesia's bids to join the OECD and CPTPP. On 3 June 2024, Hartarto announced that Indonesia would apply to join CPTPP in 2024, as it would be a faster method to gain access to new markets, highlighting the UK and Mexico, than negotiating individual bilateral agreements. Indonesia filed its application to join the CPTPP trade pact on 19 September 2024.

==== Philippines ====
The Philippines' interest in the CPTPP has remained, but the consultative process and legal analysis of the terms necessary for accession have been drawn out. The Philippines previously wanted to join the TPP in 2016 under Benigno Aquino, who said that the country stood to gain from becoming a member of the trade pact. Philippine Ambassador to the U.S. Jose Manuel Romualdez later clarified that the US withdrawal from TPP pushed the Philippines' application to CPTPP down the agenda, yet China's interest in acceding to CPTPP has made the trade bloc more attractive for the Philippines. In July 2024, Trade Undersecretary Allan Gepty announced that the Philippines would apply for membership of CPTPP by the end of the year. The Philippines reportedly submitted its application to the CPTPP trade pact in August 2025 according to unnamed Japanese officials.

==== Taiwan ====
Taiwan applied to join CPTPP on 22 September 2021.

It had previously expressed interest to join TPP in 2016. After TPP's evolution to CPTPP in 2018, Taiwan indicated its will to continue efforts to join CPTPP. In December 2020, the Taiwanese government stated that it would submit an application to join CPTPP following the conclusion of informal consultations with existing members. In February 2021 again, Taiwan indicated its will to apply to join CPTPP at an appropriate time. A few days after China submitted its request to join the CPTPP, Taiwan sent its own request to join the CPTPP, a move that has been one of the main policy objectives of Tsai Ing-wen's government.

==== Ukraine ====
On 1 May 2023, the Ukrainian government announced its intention for the accession of Ukraine to CPTPP. Ukraine aims to accelerate its efforts to restore its economy severely damaged by the Russian invasion. Canadian Trade Minister Mary Ng expressed support for Ukraine's application. Ukraine submitted a formal request to join the trade bloc on 5 May 2023.

==== United Arab Emirates ====
United Arab Emirates reportedly submitted its application to the CPTPP trade pact in August 2025 according to unnamed Japanese officials.

==== Uruguay ====
Uruguay filed its application to join the CPTPP trade pact on 1 December 2022. Uruguay's application received backlash from Argentina, Brazil, and Paraguay, of which make up the Mercosur trade bloc, particularly following President Lacelle Pou opening negotiations for a free trade agreement with China and signalling his willingness to cut deals with other countries. Paraguay's Foreign Minister Julio Arriola responded by stating that "Mercosur member states should negotiate as a bloc and via consensus and we continue in that line,” citing the organization's founding treaties. In 2024 Uruguay joined the Patent Cooperation Treaty (PCT) which adherence to was cited as being an essential requirement to join the CPTPP. On 1 March 2025 former foreign minister Omar Paganini stated he believes that Uruguay is poised to enter the pact with nine countries having said yes to membership and none opposed, however incumbent foreign minister Mario Lubetkin was less confident saying that Uruguay was far from reaching a deal. Uruguay was formally invited to join amid the 9th CPTPP Commission meeting held in Melbourne, Australia.

==== Existing FTAs with applicants ====
The following countries have table shows the existing free trade agreements between CPTPP member states and applicants, the more existing FTAs the faster the negotiations. As listed by the World Trade Organization.

Country	China	Costa Rica	Ecuador	Indonesia	Philippines	Taiwan	United Arab Emirates	Ukraine	Uruguay
Australia	Free Trade Agreement, Regional Comprehensive Economic Partnership	none	none	Comprehensive Economic Partnership Agreement, ASEAN Free Trade Area, Regional Comprehensive Economic Partnership	ASEAN Free Trade Area, Regional Comprehensive Economic Partnership	none		none	none
Brunei	ASEAN–China Free Trade Area, Regional Comprehensive Economic Partnership	none	none	ASEAN Free Trade Area, Regional Comprehensive Economic Partnership	ASEAN Free Trade Area, Regional Comprehensive Economic Partnership	none		none	none
Canada	none	Free Trade Agreement	none	Indonesia–Canada Comprehensive Economic Partnership Agreement		none		Free Trade Agreement	none
Chile	Free Trade Agreement	Free Trade Agreement	Global System of Trade Preferences among Developing Countries, Latin American Integration Association	Global System of Trade Preferences among Developing Countries, Comprehensive Economic Partnership Agreement		none		none	Protocol on Trade Negotiations, Latin American Integration Association
Japan	Regional Comprehensive Economic Partnership	none	none	Economic Partnership Agreement, ASEAN Free Trade Area, Regional Comprehensive Economic Partnership	ASEAN Free Trade Area, Regional Comprehensive Economic Partnership	none		none	none
Malaysia	ASEAN–China Free Trade Area, Regional Comprehensive Economic Partnership	none	Global System of Trade Preferences among Developing Countries	ASEAN Free Trade Area, Regional Comprehensive Economic Partnership	ASEAN Free Trade Area, Regional Comprehensive Economic Partnership	none		none	none
Mexico	none	Free Trade Agreement	Global System of Trade Preferences among Developing Countries, Latin American Integration Association, Partial Economic Agreement	Global System of Trade Preferences among Developing Countries		none		none	Protocol on Trade Negotiations, Latin American Integration Association
New Zealand	Free Trade Agreement, Regional Comprehensive Economic Partnership	none	none	ASEAN Free Trade Area	ASEAN Free Trade Area, Regional Comprehensive Economic Partnership	Economic Cooperation Agreement		none	none
Peru	Free Trade Agreement	Free Trade Agreement	Andean Community, Global System of Trade Preferences among Developing Countries, Latin American Integration Association	Global System of Trade Preferences among Developing Countries		none		none	Protocol on Trade Negotiations, Latin American Integration Association
Singapore	Free Trade Agreement, ASEAN–China Free Trade Area, Regional Comprehensive Economic Partnership	Free Trade Agreement	Global System of Trade Preferences among Developing Countries	ASEAN Free Trade Area, Global System of Trade Preferences among Developing Countries	ASEAN Free Trade Area, Regional Comprehensive Economic Partnership	Economic Partnership Agreement		none	none
United Kingdom	none	Central America Association Agreement	Andean Countries–United Kingdom Trade Agreement	none		none		Political, Free Trade and Strategic Partnership Agreement	none
Vietnam	ASEAN–China Free Trade Area, Regional Comprehensive Economic Partnership	none	Global System of Trade Preferences among Developing Countries	ASEAN Free Trade Area, Global System of Trade Preferences among Developing Countries, Regional Comprehensive Economic Partnership	Regional Comprehensive Economic Partnership	none		none	none

=== Expressed interest ===
Several countries have expressed interest in joining CPTPP since the revisions from TPP, including Colombia, South Korea, and Thailand.

==== European Union ====
In April 2024, Finland and Sweden proposed to the European Union that it should deepen ties with the Asia-Pacific region including CPTPP, in addition to the Indo-Pacific Economic Framework and the Regional Comprehensive Economic Partnership.

At the beginning of his second Presidency, US President Donald Trump rapidly began imposing "Reciprocal tariffs" on countries with large trade deficits with the United States. Following Trump's "Liberation Day" tariffs announcement, the European Union and the CPTPP countries revived a stalled plan for a Strategic partnership between the two trade blocs—vocally backed by Canada, New Zealand, and Singapore as well as quietly backed by Japan. On 13 May 2025, Sweden announced that it would propose that the European Union join CPTPP with the aim of forming the world's biggest free trade area to help counter the impact of US President Donald Trump's tariffs. The European Union has free trade agreements with 8 out of 12 CPTPP members, potentially fast tracking any future EU accession negotiations. Facing persistent dysfunction at the World Trade Organization and new US tariffs, EU leaders are exploring closer cooperation with the CPTPP as both an alternative and a catalyst for global trade reform. European Commission President Ursula von der Leyen has proposed structured collaboration between the EU and CPTPP members, presenting this as a first step toward redesigning the global trade order and demonstrating that broad, rules-based free trade remains achievable. German Chancellor Friedrich Merz and other EU leaders have voiced support for this initiative, emphasizing the need for new institutional mechanisms to replace the WTO’s stalled dispute resolution functions. A trade and investment dialogue was launched in November 2025.

==== South Korea ====
In January 2021, South Korea's Moon administration announced it was interested in joining CPTPP. The country will examine sanitary and phytosanitary measures, fisheries subsidies, digital trade and guidelines related to state-run enterprises to meet the requirements that CPTPP had suggested. The South Korean government formally announced it will begin its application to join CPTPP in December 2021. During the 57th Japan-South Korea Business Conference, both parties agreed to support preliminary measures by relevant organisations to facilitate South Korea's bid to join the CPTPP.

==== Thailand ====
In November 2021, a Thai government official stated that Thailand aimed to join talks on membership of CPTPP, which had been viewed as a method to boost the Thai economy, additionally it would increase the competitivity of Thai goods against rivals, notably Malaysia and Vietnam, in sectors such as agricultural and electronic industries. Foreign Minister Don Pramudwinai was expected to submit a letter of intent for the country to apply to join the pact to the cabinet for its approval. A campaign against joining the pact called "#NoCPTPP" which has gathered 400,000 signatures has demanded the prime minister to not consider joining the pact. Thailand has remained interested in joining CPTPP as part of its free trade agreement strategy to expand its trade and investment opportunities with various partners around the world, however has not submitted a formal application.

==== United States ====
On 25 January 2018, U.S. President Donald Trump in an interview announced his interest in possibly rejoining the TPP if it were a "substantially better deal" for the United States. He had withdrawn the U.S. from the original agreement in January 2017. On 12 April 2018, he told the White House National Economic Council Director Larry Kudlow and U.S. Trade Representative Robert Lighthizer to look into joining CPTPP. U.S. Wheat Associates President Vince Peterson had said in December 2018 that American wheat exporters could face an "imminent collapse" in their 53% market share in Japan due to exclusion from CPTPP. Peterson added, "Our competitors in Australia and Canada will now benefit from those [CPTPP] provisions, as U.S. farmers watch helplessly." The National Cattlemen's Beef Association stated that exports of beef to Japan, America's largest export market, would be at a serious disadvantage to Australian exporters, whose tariffs on exports to Japan would be cut by 27.5% during the first year of CPTPP.

In December 2020, a bipartisan group of U.S. policy experts, Richard L. Armitage and Joseph S. Nye Jr., called for Washington to join the CPTPP, but this call was rejected by Secretary of Commerce Gina Raimondo when meeting Japanese government leaders on 15 November 2021. Raimondo stated that the Biden administration would not be joining CPTPP but instead planned to create a new trade framework as an alternative to CPTPP in the Indo-Pacific region.

=== Membership status among Pacific Rim countries and territories ===
Country / Territory	CPTPP Member?	APEC Member?	Expressed Interest in Joining CPTPP?
American Samoa	No	No	No
Australia	Yes	Yes	N/A (Current member)
Brunei	Yes	Yes	N/A (Current member)
Cambodia	No	No	Yes (applied)
Canada	Yes	Yes	N/A (Current member)
Chile	Yes	Yes	N/A (Current member)
China	No	Yes	Yes (Applied)
Colombia	No	No	Yes
Cook Islands	No	No	No
Costa Rica	No	No	Yes (Applied)
Ecuador	No	No	Yes (Applied)
El Salvador	No	No	No
Federated States of Micronesia	No	No	No
Fiji	No	No	No
French Polynesia	No	No	No
Guam	No	No	No
Guatemala	No	No	No
Honduras	No	No	No
Hong Kong	No	Yes	No
Indonesia	No	Yes	Yes (Applied)
Japan	Yes	Yes	N/A (Current member)
Kiribati	No	No	No
Macau	No	No	No
Malaysia	Yes	Yes	N/A (Current member)
Marshall Islands	No	No	No
Mexico	Yes	Yes	N/A (Current member)
Nauru	No	No	No
New Caledonia	No	No	No
New Zealand	Yes	Yes	N/A (Current member)
Nicaragua	No	No	No
Niue	No	No	No
Norfolk Island	Yes (through Australia)	No	N/A (Current member through Australia)
North Korea	No	No	No
Northern Mariana Islands	No	No	No
Palau	No	No	No
Panama	No	No	No
Papua New Guinea	No	Yes	No
Peru	Yes	Yes	N/A (Current member)
Philippines	No	Yes	Yes
Pitcairn Islands	Possibly (Unconfirmed member through United Kingdom)	No	N/A (Possible member through United Kingdom)
Russia	No	Yes	No
Samoa	No	No	No
Singapore	Yes	Yes	N/A (Current member)
Solomon Islands	No	No	No
South Korea	No	Yes	Yes
Taiwan	No	Yes	Yes (Applied)
Thailand	No	Yes	Yes
Timor-Leste	No	No	No
Tokelau	No	No	No
Tonga	No	No	No
Tuvalu	No	No	No
United States	No	Yes	No
Vanuatu	No	No	No
Vietnam	Yes	Yes	N/A (Current member)
Wallis and Futuna	No	No	No

== Responses ==
Economist Gabriel Palma has criticized the treaty for severely restricting the sovereignty of the signatories. Signatories are subject to international courts and have restrictions on what their state-owned enterprises can do. According to Palma the treaty makes it difficult for countries to implement policies aimed to diversify exports thus becoming a so-called middle income trap. Palma also accuses that the treaty is reinforcing unequal relations by being drafted to reflect the laws of the United States.

In the case of Chile, Palma holds the treaty is redundant regarding the possibilities of trade as Chile already has trade treaties with ten of its members. On the contrary, economist Klaus Schmidt–Hebbel consider that the CPTPP "deepening" of already existing trade relations of Chile is a point in favour of it. In the view of Schmidt-Hebbel approving the treaty is important for the post-Covid economic recovery of Chile and wholly in line with the economic policies of Chile since the 1990s.

In mid November 2021 the Waitangi Tribunal, a standing commission of inquiry established in 1975 to investigate the New Zealand Crown's breaches of the Treaty of Waitangi, found that the Crown had failed to meet its Treaty obligations to protect Māori interests as part of the CPTPP but acknowledged that several major changes occurred in the negotiation process. While the Tribunal was satisfied that the Crown's engagement with Māori over the CPTPP and secrecy had been resolved through negotiation, it ruled there were significant risks to Māori in the e-commerce provisions of the CPTPP and data sovereignty. Following an earlier 2016 Tribunal ruling, a Māori advisory committee called Te Taumata had been established while a second body known as Ngā Toki Whakarururanga was established as a result of the mediation agreement.

== See also ==
- Accession of the United Kingdom to CPTPP
- Asia-Pacific Economic Cooperation (APEC)
- Free and Open Indo-Pacific (FOIP)
- Free trade agreements of Canada
- Free trade agreements of New Zealand
- Free trade agreements of the United Kingdom
- Free trade agreements of Vietnam
- Free trade area
- Indo-Pacific Economic Framework (IPEF)
- Market access
- Organisation for Economic Co-operation and Development (OECD)
- Pacific Rim
- Regional Comprehensive Economic Partnership (RCEP)
- Rules of origin
- Tariff
- Trans-Pacific Strategic Economic Partnership Agreement (TPSEP)

=== Bilateral FTAs ===
- Australia–Chile Free Trade Agreement (ACFTA)
- Australia–Japan Economic Partnership Agreement (JAEPA)
- Australia–United Kingdom Free Trade Agreement (AUKFTA)
- Canada–Chile Free Trade Agreement (CCFTA)
- Canada–Peru Free Trade Agreement (CPFTA)
- Canada–United Kingdom Free Trade Agreement (CUKFTA)
- Canada–United Kingdom Trade Continuity Agreement (CUKTCA)
- Chile–Mexico Free Trade Agreement (CMFTA)
- Japan–United Kingdom Comprehensive Economic Partnership Agreement (JUKCEPA)
- Malaysia–New Zealand Free Trade Agreement (MNFTA)
- Mexico–United Kingdom Free Trade Agreement (MUKFTA)
- New Zealand–United Kingdom Free Trade Agreement (NZUKFTA)
- Singapore–United Kingdom Free Trade Agreement (SUKFTA)
- United Kingdom–Vietnam Free Trade Agreement (UKVFTA)
