= Preferential trading area =

Type of trade bloc

A preferential trade area (also preferential trade agreement, PTA) is a trading bloc that gives preferential access to certain products from the participating countries. This is done by reducing tariffs but not by abolishing them completely. It is the first stage of economic integration.

These tariff preferences have created numerous departures from the normal trade relations principle, namely that World Trade Organization (WTO) members should apply the same tariff to imports from other WTO members.

With the recent multiplication of bilateral PTAs and the emergence of Mega-PTAs (wide regional trade agreements such as the Transatlantic Trade and Investment Partnership (TTIP) or Trans Pacific Partnership (TPP)), a global trade system exclusively managed within the framework of the WTO now seems unrealistic and the interactions between trade systems have to be taken into account. The increased complexity of the international trade system generated by the multiplication of PTAs should be taken into account in the study of the choice of fora used by countries or regions to promote their trade relations and environmental agenda. PTAs have seen rapid growth; in the 1990s, there were slightly more than 100 PTAs. By 2014, there were more than 700.

== Predictors ==
In 2004, Scott Baier and Jeffrey Bergstrand published that there were three economic determinants critical to the formation of PTAs. Countries are more likely to participate in PTAs if they have low transportation costs and larger economies. Third, countries with similar economic sizes are likely to benefit the most by forming PTAs. Economic determinants like GDP, similarity of economic size, and distance between countries correctly predict over 80% of PTAs in effect as of 2020.

The remaining PTAs can be attributed to political predictors. Countries under democratic rule are more likely to participate in PTAs than those under autocratic rule. Autocratic rulers are not elected, and thus do not have their power threatened by dissatisfied citizens. Democratic leaders are incentivized to keep their constituents satisfied, and PTAs can help lower the price of consumer goods. Advocating for PTAs also lets democratic leaders signal to voters that they are committed to policies that improve their welfare. Countries are also more likely to join PTAs if competitor countries have already done so.

== List of preferential trade areas ==
Stages of economic integration around the world (each country colored according to the most integrated multilateral agreement that it participates in): Economic and monetary union (ECCU/XCD, Eurozone/EUR, Switzerland–Liechtenstein/CHF) Economic union (CSME, EAEU, EU, GCC, Mercosur, SICA) Common market (EEA–Switzerland) Customs and monetary union (CEMAC/XAF, UEMOA/XOF) Customs union (CAN, EAC, EUCU, SACU) Multilateral free-trade area (AANZFTA, ASEAN, CEFTA, CISFTA, COMESA, CPTPP, EFTA, GAFTA, PAFTA, RCEP, SADCFTA, SAFTA, USMCA)

A free trade area is basically a preferential trade area with increased depth and scope of tariffs reduction. All free trade areas, customs unions, common markets, economic unions, customs and monetary unions and economic and monetary unions are considered advanced forms of a PTA, but these are not listed below.

=== Multilateral ===
- Economic Cooperation Organization (ECO) (1992)
- Generalized System of Preferences
- Global System of Trade Preferences among Developing Countries (GSTP) (1989)
- Latin American Integration Association (LAIA/ALADI) (1981)
- Melanesian Spearhead Group (MSG) (1994)
- Protocol on Trade Negotiations (PTN) (1973)
- South Pacific Regional Trade and Economic Cooperation Agreement (SPARTECA) (1981)

=== Bilateral ===
Several hundred bilateral PTAs have been signed since the early 20th century. The TREND project of the Canada Research Chair in International Political Economy lists around 700 trade agreements, the vast majority of which are bilateral.

- European Union – ACP countries, formerly via the trade aspects of the Cotonou Agreement, later via Everything But Arms (EBA) agreements
- India – Afghanistan (2003)
- India – Mauritius
- India – Nepal (2009)
- India – Chile (2007)
- India – MERCOSUR (2009)
- ASEAN – China (2005)
- Laos – Thailand (1991)
- Bangladesh – Bhutan (2020)

== See also ==
- Anti-globalization movement
- Bilateral investment treaty (BIT)
- Criticisms of globalization
- Trade and Investment Framework Agreement (TIFA).
