= Free trade agreements of China =

Mainland China Countries and territories with free trade agreements with mainland China (bilateral, ACFTA, and RCEP)

China is party to several free trade agreements (FTAs) worldwide.

== Active agreements ==
The following agreements are currently in effect, signature and entry into force dates are as listed by the World Trade Organization.

Nation(s)/Region(s)	Signed	Effective	Treaty	Ref.
Hong Kong	29 June 2003	29 June 2003	Closer Economic Partnership Agreement	
Macau	18 October 2003	18 October 2003	Closer Economic Partnership Agreement	
Chile	18 November 2005	1 October 2006	Free Trade Agreement	
Chile	11 November 2017		Upgraded Protocol	
Pakistan	24 November 2006	7 July 2007	Free Trade Agreement	
Pakistan	28 April 2019	1 January 2020	Upgraded Protocol	
New Zealand	7 April 2008	1 October 2008	Free Trade Agreement	
New Zealand	26 January 2021		Upgraded Protocol	
Singapore	23 October 2008	1 January 2009	Free Trade Agreement	
Singapore	12 November 2018		Upgraded Protocol	
Peru	28 April 2009	1 March 2010	Free Trade Agreement	
ASEAN	21 November 2007	1 January 2010	Free Trade Area	
ASEAN	22 November 2015		Upgraded Protocol	
Taiwan	29 June 2010	12 September 2010	Economic Cooperation Framework Agreement	
Costa Rica	8 April 2010	1 August 2011	Free Trade Agreement	
Iceland	15 April 2013	1 July 2014	Free Trade Agreement	
Switzerland	6 July 2013	1 July 2014	Free Trade Agreement	
South Korea	1 June 2015	20 December 2015	Free Trade Agreement	
Australia	17 June 2015	20 December 2015	Free Trade Agreement	
Georgia	13 May 2017	1 January 2018	Free Trade Agreement	
Maldives	7 December 2017	1 January 2025	Free Trade Agreement	
Mauritius	17 October 2019	1 January 2021	Free Trade Agreement	
Cambodia	12 October 2020	1 January 2022	Free Trade Agreement	
RCEP; Australia; Brunei; Cambodia; Indonesia; Japan; South Korea; Laos; Malaysia; Myanmar; New Zealand; Philippines; Singapore; Thailand	15 November 2020	1 January 2022	Regional Comprehensive Economic Partnership	
Nicaragua	31 August 2023	1 January 2024	Free Trade Agreement	
Ecuador	11 May 2023	1 May 2024	Free Trade Agreement	
Serbia	17 October 2023	1 July 2024	Free Trade Agreement	

== Negotiations ==
The following agreements are currently under negotiation.

Nation(s)	Treaty
Sri Lanka	Free Trade Agreement
Moldova	Free Trade Agreement
Palestine	Free Trade Agreement
Panama	Free Trade Agreement
Norway	Free Trade Agreement
Japan; South Korea	Free Trade Agreement
Gulf Cooperation Council	Free Trade Agreement
Israel	Free Trade Agreement
Honduras	Free Trade Agreement

== Agreements of Hong Kong ==
Hong Kong Countries and territories with free trade agreements with Hong Kong

As a special administrative region (SAR) of the People's Republic of China, Hong Kong maintains its own custom territory separate from mainland China, and signs its own agreements. The following agreements are currently in effect, signature and entry into force dates are as listed by the WTO.

Nation(s)/Region(s)	Signed	Effective	Treaty	Ref.
China	29 June 2003	29 June 2003	Closer Economic Partnership Agreement	
New Zealand	29 March 2010	1 January 2011	Free Trade Agreement	
EFTA; Iceland; Liechtenstein; Norway; Switzerland	21 June 2011	1 October 2012	Free Trade Agreement	
Chile	7 September 2012	9 October 2014	Free Trade Agreement	
Macau	27 October 2017	27 October 2017	Closer Economic Partnership Agreement	
ASEAN	28 March 2018	11 June 2019	Free Trade Agreement	
Georgia	28 June 2018	13 February 2019	Free Trade Agreement	
Australia	26 March 2019	17 January 2020	Free Trade Agreement	
