= ACFTA =

ACFTA may refer to:

- African Continental Free Trade Area (AfCFTA)
- ASEAN–China Free Trade Area (ACFTA)
