= Global System of Trade Preferences among Developing Countries =

Preferential trade agreement signed in 1988 by 42 developing countries

- Type: Preferential Trade Agreement
- Signed: April 13, 1988
- Location: Belgrade, Serbia
- Effective: April 19, 1989
- Parties: 43 participants (42 countries and Mercosur): Algeria; Argentina; Bangladesh; Benin; The Plurinational State of Bolivia; Brazil; Cameroon; Chile; Cuba; Democratic People’s Republic of Korea; Ecuador; Egypt; Ghana; Guinea; Guyana; India; Indonesia; The Islamic Republic of Iran; Iraq; Libya; Malaysia; Mexico; Morocco; Mozambique; Myanmar; Nicaragua; Nigeria; Pakistan; Paraguay; Peru; Philippines; South Korea; Singapore; Sri Lanka; Sudan; Thailand; Trinidad and Tobago; Tunisia; The United Republic of Tanzania; Uruguay; The Bolivarian Republic of Venezuela; Vietnam; Zimbabwe; Mercosur
- Depositary: Morocco, United Nations Conference on Trade and Development
- Languages: Arabic, English, French, Spanish

The Global System of Trade Preferences among Developing Countries (GSTP) is an interregional preferential trade agreement among developing countries. Signed on 13 April 1988, it entered into force on 19 April 1989 and currently has 43 participants (42 countries and Mercosur), including seven least developed countries. The agreement was negotiated with the support of the United Nations Conference on Trade and Development (UNCTAD).

The Agreement is legally covered under the Enabling Clause of GATT 1994, which permits developing countries to exchange preferential tariff reductions through regional or global arrangements without extending those preferences to all WTO members under the most-favoured-nation principle.

The Agreement was initiated by UNCTAD to promote trade among developing countries, thereby fostering economic growth and South-South cooperation and has its roots in the Group of 77, a coalition of 134 developing countries created in 1964 to increase their negotiating leverage and promote their economic interests.

The GSTP is a framework for preferential tariff reductions and other measures of cooperation, including "para-tariffs, non-tariff measures, direct trade measures including medium and long-term contracts and sectoral agreements", to stimulate trade between developing countries. Today, only preferential tariffs are covered by the agreement.

Through the GSTP, participants aim to promote economic growth and development by expanding South-South trade. The Committee of Participants (COP) is the highest decision-making organ and oversees the operation of the Agreement, while the UNCTAD secretariat provides substantive and technical support.

== History ==
=== Background ===
The first efforts to implement a preferential trading system at the plurilateral level that would encompass developing countries started in the mid-60s.

Following the establishment of the GATT Committee on Trade and Development in 1965, the Group on Expansion of Trade among Developing Countries was set up to analyse the dynamics of trade among developing countries. In 1967, the first meeting of the Trade Negotiations Committee of Developing Countries in GATT was held. The Committee's aim was to collect lists of exports and concessions from developing countries in order to identify a common basis for negotiations.

In 1971 a Protocol on Trade Negotiations among Developing Countries (PTN) was agreed under the auspices of the Trade Negotiations Committee of Developing Countries and signed by 16 countries (Brazil, Chile, Egypt, Greece, India, Israel, Korea, Pakistan, Peru, Spain, Tunisia, Türkiye, Uruguay, Yugoslavia, Mexico and the Philippines), entering into force in 1973.

As stated in the Protocol, the countries "agreed that the establishment of preferences among developing countries, appropriately administered and subject to the necessary safeguards, could make an important contribution to the trade among developing countries, and that such arrangements should be looked at in a constructive and forward-looking spirit". The protocol covered 740 tariff positions, of which about one third covered agricultural products and raw materials.

In parallel, the Group of 77 was working to promote the change necessary to realise the conditions that would foster economic development for developing countries. During the 1976 Mexico City Conference on Economic Co-operation among Developing Countries, a detailed programme on economic co-operation was compiled. The programme covered trade extensively and provided the conceptual basis for the GSTP. In fact, section XV. "Trade among developing countries" expressly mentioned the intention to "review all tariff and non-tariff problems relating to development of trade among developing countries" and "establish a system of trade preferences among developing countries at the subregional, regional, and interregional levels. Such a system should not allow the extension to developed countries of preferences granted to developing countries".

The programme would be endorsed during the Fourth Ministerial Meeting of the Group of 77 in Arusha in 1979 and developed further in Caracas in 1981.

=== Negotiations ===
In 1982, Ministers of Foreign Affairs belonging to the Group of 77 met in New York and defined the main components of the Agreement, establishing the negotiations framework as well. The Group of 77 began preparatory work in Geneva in 1984 with Ministerial impetus provided in 1985 through the New Delhi Ministerial Meeting.

It is during the Ministerial Meeting in Brasilia in 1986 that the GSTP was established as a provisional legal framework. The negotiations on the text of the Agreement were to be completed two years after in Belgrade, jointly with the first round of tariff reduction negotiations.

In April 1989, when the Agreement entered into force, the schedules of tariff concessions covered about 1,800 tariff items. Following the dissolution of Yugoslavia, which accounted for the bulk of the concessions, coverage fell to around 1,000 products; Romania's withdrawal in 2007 reduced it further below 1,000 tariff items.

In 1992, participants launched a Second Round of negotiations in Tehran to broaden and deepen tariff concessions. The round concluded in 1998, when 24 of the 43 participants granted concessions covering about 900 tariff items, but those concessions were not ratified.

=== São Paulo Round ===
In 2004, GSTP participants abandoned efforts to ratify the Second Round concessions and launched a third round of negotiations, the São Paulo Round, at UNCTAD XI in São Paulo, Brazil. The round aimed to broaden and deepen tariff concessions, particularly to promote interregional trade among participants.

Under the authority of the GSTP Negotiating Committee, 22 participants took part in the São Paulo Round: Argentina, Brazil, Paraguay and Uruguay (forming Mercosur), Algeria, Chile, Cuba, the Democratic People’s Republic of Korea, Egypt, India, Indonesia, the Islamic Republic of Iran, Malaysia, Mexico, Morocco, Nigeria, Pakistan, the Republic of Korea, Sri Lanka, Thailand, Viet Nam and Zimbabwe.

Ministerial guidance was provided in April 2008 at UNCTAD XII in Accra, Ghana. In December 2009 in Geneva, ministers adopted modalities for the exchange of tariff concessions. Participants were to reduce applied most-favoured-nation tariffs by at least 20 per cent on at least 70 per cent of their dutiable tariff lines. For participants whose duty-free tariff lines accounted for more than half of the national tariff, the same cut applied to at least 60 per cent of dutiable lines. The modalities also provided differential and more favourable treatment for least developed countries.

The GSTP Ministerial meeting in Foz do Iguaçu, Brazil, 2010. In the center, Mr. Supachai Panitchpakdi, former UNCTAD Secretary-General.

The round concluded on 15–16 December 2010 at a ministerial meeting in Foz do Iguaçu, Brazil. Eight participants—11 countries when the four Mercosur member states are counted separately—exchanged tariff concessions and adopted the São Paulo Round Protocol: Mercosur (Argentina, Brazil, Paraguay and Uruguay), Cuba, Egypt, India, Indonesia, Malaysia, Morocco and the Republic of Korea. The Protocol provides that other GSTP participants may accede after its entry into force by submitting proposed tariff schedules based on the same reduction modalities.

=== Implementation ===
Under paragraph 10 (c) of the Protocol, the results of the São Paulo Round will enter into force with the ratification of at least four countries. Currently, Argentina (2018), Brazil (2022), Cuba (2013), India (2010), Malaysia (2011) and Uruguay (2017) ratified the Agreement. However, ratification by all four members of Mercosur is required for the Protocol to be deemed to have been ratified by Mercosur as a group, as the group maintains a single schedule of tariff concessions as a customs union with common external tariffs. Pending one more ratification, the São Paulo Round results remain to be implemented.

Under paragraph 10(c) of the Protocol, the São Paulo Round results enter into force after ratification or acceptance by at least four participants.

In April 2011, the Committee of Participants established the Sub-Committee of Signatories to supervise implementation of the São Paulo Round results and the Working Group on Rules of Origin to examine possible revisions to the GSTP rules of origin.

Currently, Argentina (2018), Brazil (2022), Cuba (2013), India (2010), Malaysia (2011) and Uruguay (2017) ratified the Agreement. However, ratification by all four members of Mercosur is required for the Protocol to be deemed to have been ratified by Mercosur as a group, as the group maintains a single schedule of tariff concessions as a customs union with common external tariffs. Pending one more ratification, the São Paulo Round results remain to be implemented.

At UNCTAD XVI in October 2025, a ministerial-level special session of the Committee of Participants—the first such session since 2012—adopted a joint communiqué acknowledging ongoing technical work to prepare for the Protocol's entry into force.

== Membership ==
=== GSTP membership and São Paulo Round participants ===
| GSTP Members (43) | Participating in the “São Paulo Round” | Signatory members of the final Protocol of the “São Paulo Round” | Ratification |
|---|---|---|---|
| Algeria | Yes | | |
| Argentina | Yes | Through MERCOSUR | Yes |
| Bangladesh | | | |
| Benin | | | |
| The Plurinational State of Bolivia | | | |
| Brazil | Yes | Through MERCOSUR | Yes |
| Cameroon | | | |
| Chile | Yes | | |
| Cuba | Yes | Yes | Yes |
| Democratic People’s Republic of Korea | Yes | | |
| Ecuador | | | |
| Egypt | Yes | Yes | |
| Ghana | | | |
| Guinea | | | |
| Guyana | | | |
| India | Yes | Yes | Yes |
| Indonesia | Yes | Yes | |
| The Islamic Republic of Iran | Yes | | |
| Iraq | | | |
| Libya | | | |
| Malaysia | Yes | Yes | Yes |
| Mexico | Yes | | |
| Morocco | Yes | Yes | |
| Mozambique | | | |
| Myanmar | | | |
| Nicaragua | | | |
| Nigeria | Yes | | |
| Pakistan | Yes | | |
| Paraguay | Yes | Through MERCOSUR | |
| Peru | | | |
| Philippines | | | |
| South Korea | Yes | Yes | |
| Singapore | | | |
| Sri Lanka | Yes | | |
| Sudan | | | |
| Thailand | Yes | | |
| Trinidad and Tobago | | | |
| Tunisia | | | |
| The United Republic of Tanzania | | | |
| Uruguay | Yes | Through MERCOSUR | Yes |
| The Bolivarian Republic of Venezuela | | | |
| Vietnam | Yes | | |
| Zimbabwe | Yes | | |
| Mercosur | Yes | Yes | |

Former members: Yugoslavia (from 1989-04-19 until dissolution), Romania (from 1989-04-19 until its EU membership), Colombia (from 1989-04-19 until 2017).

== Implications for South-South trade ==
South-South exports grew at an average annual rate of about 10 per cent between 1995 and 2024, compared with 6.1 per cent for world exports. The value of South-South trade rose from about US$0.5 trillion in 1995 to US$6.8 trillion in 2025, and its trade volume is now higher than South-North trade.

GSTP participants represent significant markets as well. According to UNCTAD, the 43 GSTP participants represent a market of around US$18 trillion and account for nearly one-fifth of global merchandise imports. In addition, GSTP participants generated about US$4.4 trillion in import demand in 2025, equivalent to 18 per cent of world imports.

South-South trade has also become more technologically intensive. Between 2020 and 2023, high- and medium-technology manufactures accounted on average for 49 per cent of South-South exports, including 28 per cent high-technology and 21 per cent medium-technology manufactures.

The eight São Paulo Round signatories—11 countries when the four Mercosur members are counted separately—had a combined population of about 2.3 billion in 2025, around 56 per cent of the population of all GSTP participants and 27.6 per cent of the world population. Their merchandise imports exceeded US$2.4 trillion and exports were about US$2.3 trillion in 2024. The tariff concessions exchanged under the São Paulo Round Protocol cover 47,324 tariff lines, compared with 651 tariff items under the first round of negotiations.

UNCTAD’s model-based estimates suggest that implementation of the São Paulo Round by its eight current signatories would generate shared welfare gains of about US$14 billion. The same estimates put potential welfare gains at about US$27 billion if the São Paulo Round commitments were implemented by all GSTP participants.

== See also ==
- Group of 77
- Market access
- South-South Cooperation
- Tariffs
- United Nations Conference on Trade and Development
