= Canada Research Chair in International Political Economy =

University research chair

The Canada Research Chair in International Political Economy is a university research chair with financial support from the Canadian government. Interested in current environmental issues and in international trade, it deals mainly with international law, governance and international politics.

== Canada Research Chair in International Political Economy ==
Launched in October 2014, the Canada Research Chair in International Political Economy conducts research on the relationship between trade and environment in international law. Since its inception, the chair has been led by Jean-Frédéric Morin, Professor of Political Science at Laval University in Quebec City. The chair also maintains close ties with the Institute for Advanced International Studies (HEI) and with several international partners. The chair is funded by the Social Sciences and Humanities Research Council of Canada (SSHRC), the Canadian Foundation for Innovation (CFI), the Center for International Business Governance (CIGI) and the Center for Pluridisciplinary Studies in Trade and Investment (CEPCI) of Laval University.

=== Research and aims ===
The aim of the chair is to contribute to a better understanding of the phenomenon of globalization by conducting innovative research projects and by training promising researchers. It also aims to inform and advise policy makers on current practices in international environmental and trade law by writing policy briefs and creating interactive tools. The chair is particularly interested in international trade, intellectual property, environmental protection and foreign investment.

=== Ongoing projects ===
The Canada Research Chair in International Political Economy works mainly on two projects: the TREND (TRade and ENvironment Database) database and the TIPEA (Trade and Investment Provisions in International Environmental Agreements) database. Both projects have a very micro approach, involving many research assistants and manual coding of provisions, resulting in high accuracy and acuity in the data collected.

==== TREND ====
TREND is a database developed at the Canada Research Chair in International Political Economy in Laval University that lists more than 300 environmental provisions in nearly 700 international (bilateral and multilateral) free trade agreements. Several scientific publications published in journals such as the Journal of International Economic Law and Global Environmental Politics are derived from the data collected in this database. Created in collaboration with the German Development Institute (DIE) in Bonn, Germany, an interactive website (TREND Analytics) listing the results of the TREND database has recently been released to provide quality information to stakeholders and decision-makers.

==== TIPEA ====
Unlike TREND, TIPEA compiles a set of trade standards in nearly 3,000 bilateral and multilateral environmental agreements. Research on the TIPEA database is still ongoing, but some scientific articles have already been published.
