= South Pacific Regional Trade and Economic Co-operation Agreement =

International trade agreement

The South Pacific Regional Trade and Economic Co-operation Agreement (SPARTECA) is a nonreciprocal trade agreement in which Australia and New Zealand offer duty-free and unrestricted access for specified products originating from the developing island member countries of the Pacific Islands Forum. The agreement was signed in 1980 in Tarawa, Kiribati, and subject to Rules of Origin regulations, designed to address the unequal trade relationships between the two groups. The textiles, clothing and footwear (TCF) industry has been a major beneficiary of SPARTECA through the preferential access to Australian and New Zealand markets. The agreement entered into force on 1 January 1981.

== TCF in Fiji ==
The local Fiji textiles, clothing and footwear (TCF) industry has grown over the last 10 years and is now one of the major industries in Fiji. In 1997 the TCF industry accounted for 26% of Fiji’s total domestic exports; it contributed to some 3.5% of GDP and provided employment for about 18,000 people that account for 16% of those in total paid employment. The rapid expansion of the Fiji TCF industry has been attributed to the removal of TCF quotas by the Australian Government in 1987 which allowed quota free and duty-free access under SPARTECA, the introduction of the Tax Free Factory/Zone (TFF/TFZ) Scheme in 1988 and the Australian Import Credit Scheme (ICS).

== Australian ICS ==
The Australian ICS commenced in July 1991 as part of a larger package of tariff and other industrial reforms in Australia. It was introduced as a temporary measure to encourage Australian TCF exports and terminated on 30 June 2000, except in the case of Fiji, where an extension had been granted to October 2000.

== Details of SPARTECA ==
Given the Australian and Fiji Governments’ commitment to developing a WTO-friendly arrangement in place of the ICS, the SPARTECA (TCF Provisions) Scheme was developed. SPARTECA (TCF) provisions concept complements the existing SPARTECA treaty and provides for a change in the way local area content (LAC) is calculated for TCF products (goods) entering Australia from Forum Island Countries (FICs). Under the existing SPARTECA arrangements, goods can enter Australia duty free where the Allowable Factory Cost is greater than or equal to 50% of the total ex-factory cost of manufacturing the goods. These arrangements continue to stand.

The SPARTECA (TCF provisions) Scheme enables companies to utilise excess local area content (ELAC) from certain SPARTECA qualifying TCF goods to help meet the 50% content requirement in otherwise non-qualifying Eligible Goods. ELAC is only derived where a product’s LAC exceeds 70%. Similarly, ELAC can only be used where a product’s LAC is greater than 35%, and where there is a last process of manufacture performed in the FIC. The duration of the S-TCF Scheme is from March 1, 2001 to December 31, 2004.

== Member Countries ==
- Australia
- Cook Islands
- Fiji
- Kiribati
- Marshall Islands
- Micronesia
- Nauru
- New Zealand
- Niue
- Papua New Guinea
- Samoa
- Solomon Islands
- Tonga
- Tuvalu
- Vanuatu

== See also ==
- Melanesian Spearhead Group
- North American Free Trade Agreement
- South Asian Association for Regional Cooperation
- Pacific Agreement on Closer Economic Relations
- Trans-Pacific Strategic Economic Partnership (P4)
