= Institute for Advanced International Studies =

School of Advanced International Studies
- École supérieure d'études internationales
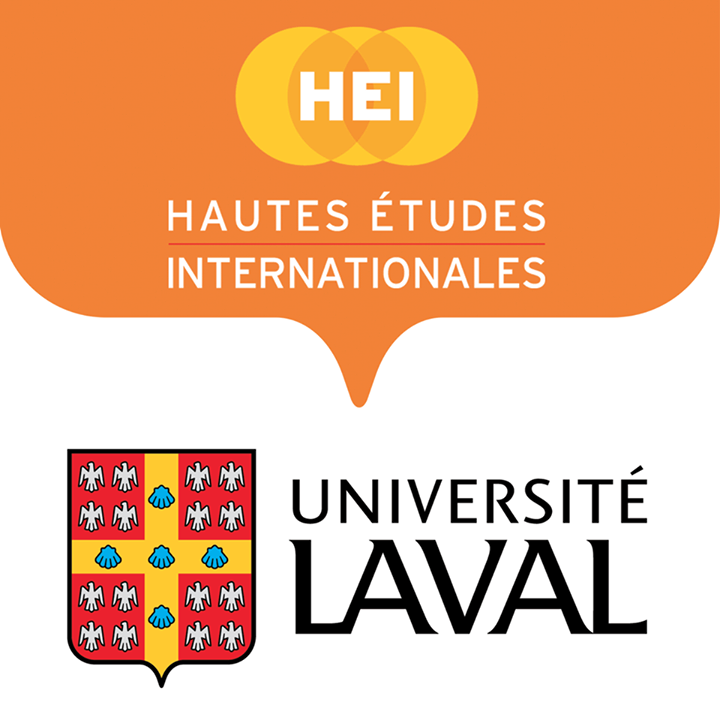
- Former name: Institute for Advanced International Studies (Institut québécois des hautes études internationales - HEI)
- Type: Public, post-graduate
- Established: 2019
- Academic affiliation: Université Laval
- President: Pierre S. Pettigrew
- Director: Louis Bélanger
- Address: Pavillon Charles-De Koninck 1030, avenue des Sciences-Humaines, Quebec City, Québec, Canada
- Language: French

The School of Advanced International Studies, formerly the Institute for Advanced International Studies (in French Institut québécois des hautes études internationales), is a part of Université Laval.

The School conducts research on and teaches international studies with an interdisciplinary focus.

== Faculty ==
- Pierre Pettigrew (President)
- Louis Bélanger (Director)
- About 80 scientific researchers specializing in the fields of International security, sustainable development, European integration, the Americas, international trade,

== Teaching activities ==
The School offers master's and doctorate programs in international studies. The program is advertised as multidisciplinary, and integrates subjects such as law, economics, management, and political science.

== Research activities ==
The School's members belong to several research groups focused on international issues:

- Centre d'études interaméricaines (CEI) (in French)
- Programme Paix et sécurité internationales (PSI) (in French)
- Cercle Europe (in French)
- Groupe d'études et de recherches sur l'Asie contemporaine (GERAC) (in French)
- Chaire de recherche du Canada sur les conflits identitaires et le terrorisme (in French)
- Chaire de recherche du Canada en droit de l'environnement (in French)
- Chaire de recherche du Canada sur les normes de gestion du développement durable (in French)
- Chaire d'études maghrébines (in French)

== Knowledge dissemination activities ==
- The peer reviewed journal, Études internationales (in French), founded in 1970, is dedicated to the study of international phenomena.
- The School organizes about 60 conferences, symposiums and round tables each year.
