= China and Southeast Asia in the Xi Jinping Era =

2018 edited volume by Alvin Cheng-Hin Lim and Frank Cibulka

- Editors: Alvin Cheng-Hin Lim; Frank Cibulka
- Authors: Trin Aiyara; Ngeow Chow-Bing; Stephen C. Druce; Narayanan Ganesan; Abdul Hai Julay; Amrita Jash; Tai Wei Lim; William B. Noseworthy; Victor R. Savage; Bilveer Singh; Andrea Chloe Wong; Teri Shaffer Yamada
- Language: English
- Subject: Geopolitics
- Genre: Nonfiction
- Published: 2018
- Publisher: Rowman & Littlefield
- Publication place: Singapore
- Media type: Hardcover
- Pages: 264
- ISBN: 978-1498581134
- OCLC: 1050962000

China and Southeast Asia in the Xi Jinping Era is an edited volume by Alvin Cheng-Hin Lim and Frank Cibulka.

== Background ==
This edited volume focuses on the countries of Southeast Asia and examines how their relations with China have changed in the era of the General secretaryship of Xi Jinping.

== Reception ==
Robert Sutter, Professor of Practice of International Affairs at the Elliott School of International Affairs wrote in his review for The China Journal, "Most of the 13 chapters in this multi-author-edited compendium largely sidestep this [US-China relations] policy-relevant comparison in favor of varied approaches to trends in China's relations with specific Southeast Asian nations during Xi Jinping's rule."

Writing for the Journal of Southeast Asian Studies, Hong Yu, a Senior Research Fellow at the East Asian Institute (Singapore) suggests that the book, "In contrast to many volumes on Sino-Southeast Asian relations that focus on China's view of the region as a whole, the country-specific chapters presented in this edited volume bring readers a nuanced picture of how Southeast Asian countries have perceived and reacted to rising Chinese influence under Xi Jinping through adaptation, negotiation, and counterreaction."
