= Regional Comprehensive Economic Partnership =

2020 Asia-Pacific free trade agreement

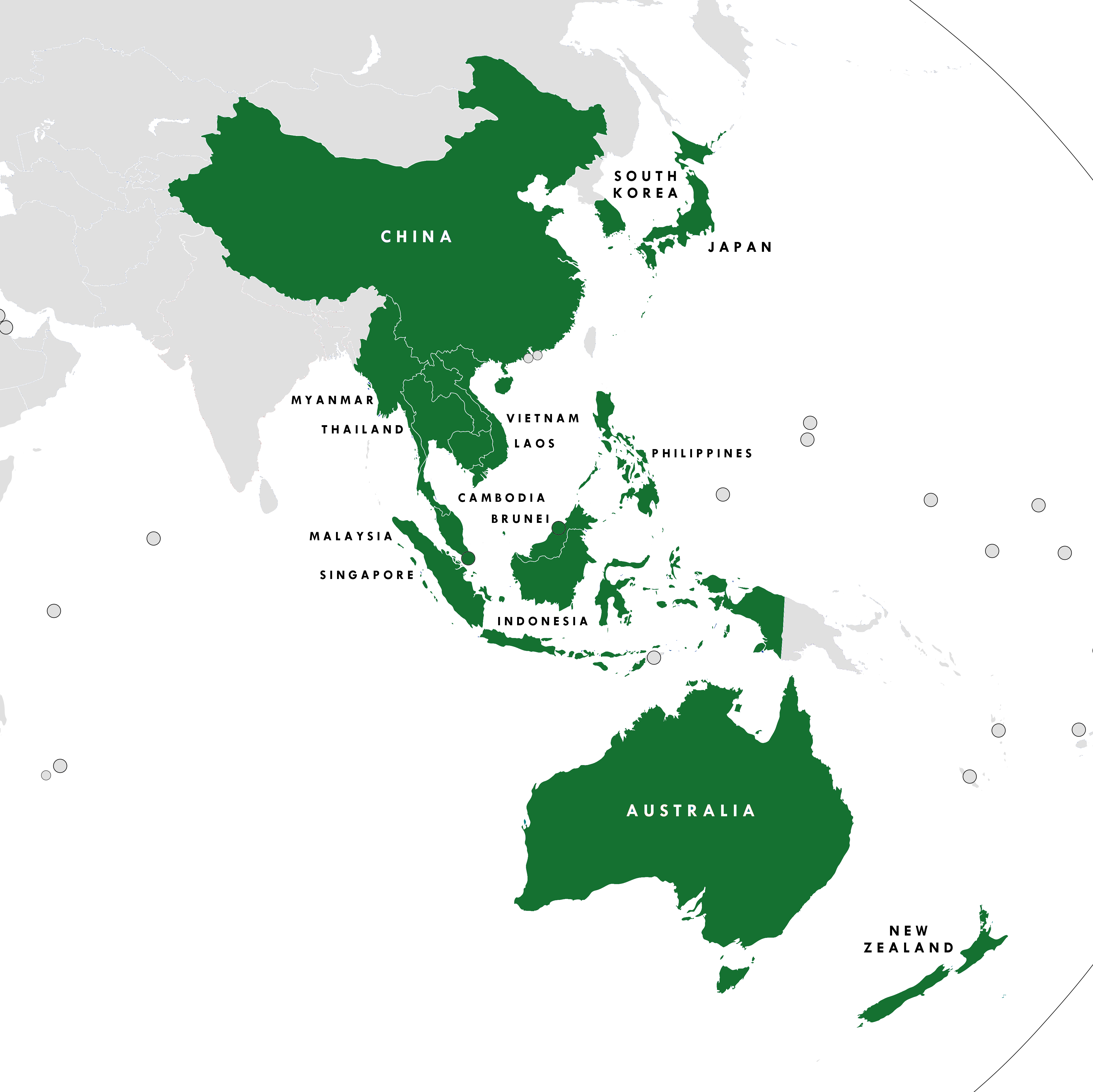
- RCEP members
- Type: Free trade agreement
- Signed: 15 November 2020
- Effective: 1 January 2022
- Signatories: 15: Australia; Brunei; Cambodia; China; Indonesia; Japan; South Korea; Laos; Malaysia; Myanmar; New Zealand; Philippines; Singapore; Thailand; Vietnam
- Parties: 14: Australia (1 January 2022); Brunei (1 January 2022); Cambodia (1 January 2022); China (1 January 2022); Indonesia (2 January 2023); Japan (1 January 2022); South Korea (1 February 2022); Laos (1 January 2022); Malaysia (18 March 2022); New Zealand (1 January 2022); Philippines (2 June 2023); Singapore (1 January 2022); Thailand (1 January 2022); Vietnam (1 January 2022)
- Depositary: Secretary-General of ASEAN
- Language: English (lingua franca)

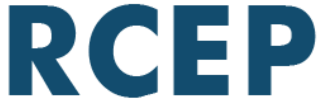
Logo of the RCEP

The Regional Comprehensive Economic Partnership (RCEP /ˈɑːrsɛp/ AR-sep) is a free trade agreement among the Asia-Pacific countries of Australia, Brunei, Cambodia, China, Indonesia, Japan, South Korea, Laos, Malaysia, Myanmar, New Zealand, the Philippines, Singapore, Thailand, and Vietnam. The 15 member countries account for about 30% of the world's population (2.2 billion people) and 30% of global GDP ($29.7 trillion), making it the largest trade bloc in history. Signed in November 2020, RCEP is the first free trade agreement among the largest economies in Asia (excluding India), including China, Indonesia, Japan, and South Korea.

The RCEP was conceived at the 2011 ASEAN Summit in Bali, Indonesia, while negotiations formally launched during the 2012 ASEAN Summit in Cambodia. India, which took part in the initial negotiations but later decided to opt out, was invited to join the bloc at any time. Any other country or separate customs territory in the region can accede to the pact from 1 July 2023 onward. The treaty was formally signed on 15 November 2020 at the virtual ASEAN Summit hosted by Vietnam. For the first ten ratifying countries, the trade pact took effect on 1 January 2022.

The RCEP includes a mix of high-, (Note: Australia, Brunei, Japan, New Zealand, Singapore and South Korea) middle-, (Note: China, Indonesia, Malaysia, the Philippines, Thailand and Vietnam) and low-income countries. (Note: Cambodia, Laos and Myanmar) It is expected to eliminate about 90% of the tariffs on imports between its signatories within 20 years of coming into force, and establish common rules for e-commerce, trade, and intellectual property. Several analysts predicted that it would offer significant economic gains for signatory states, boost post-pandemic economic recovery, as well as "pull the economic centre of gravity back towards Asia, with China poised to take the lead in writing trade rules for the region," leaving the United States behind in economic and political affairs in the region. (Note: See references) Reactions from others were neutral or negative, (Note: See references) with some analysts saying that the economic gains from the trade deal would be modest.

== Membership ==
=== Signatories ===
- All members of ASEAN (excluding Timor-Leste):
  - Brunei
  - Cambodia
  - Indonesia
  - Laos
  - Malaysia
  - Myanmar
  - Philippines
  - Singapore
  - Thailand
  - Vietnam
- RCEP is the first trade agreement to include all three East Asian members of ASEAN Plus Three:
  - China
  - Japan
  - South Korea
- The two Oceanian members of ASEAN Plus Six:
  - Australia
  - New Zealand

Flag	Country	Capital	Area (km^{2})	Population	Nominal GDP (millions of US$)	GDP per cap. (nominal, US$)	PPP GDP (millions of Int$)	GDP per cap. (PPP, Int$)	HDI	Currency	Official languages	Leaders
	Australia; Commonwealth of Australia	Canberra	7,692,024	25,698,300	1,790,348	66,589	1,791,358	66,627	0.946	Australian dollar ($) (AUD)	None (de jure); English (de facto)	Monarch: Charles III; Governor-General: Sam Mostyn; Prime Minister: Anthony Albanese
	Brunei; Brunei Darussalam; Negara Brunei Darussalam نڬارا بروني دارالسلام	Bandar Seri Begawan	5,765	459,500	15,510	35,111	34,249	77,534	0.836	Brunei dollar ($) (BND)	Malay; English	Monarch: Hassanal Bolkiah
Cambodia	Cambodia; Kingdom of Cambodia ព្រះរាជាណាចក្រកម្ពុជា Preăh Réachéanachâk Kâmpŭchéa; Royaume du Cambodge	Phnom Penh	181,035	15,626,444	45,150	2,628	142,392	8,287	0.600	Cambodian riel (៛) (KHR)	Khmer	Monarch: Norodom Sihamoni; Prime Minister: Hun Manet
People's Republic of China	China; People's Republic of China 中华人民共和国; Zhōnghuá Rénmín Gònghéguó	Beijing	9,596,961	1,400,050,000	18,532,633	13,136	35,291,015	25,015	0.788	Renminbi (Chinese yuan, ¥) (CNY)	Standard Chinese see also: Languages of China	General Secretary and President: Xi Jinping; Premier: Li Qiang
	Indonesia; Republic of Indonesia; Republik Indonesia	Jakarta	1,910,931	270,203,917	1,475,690	5,271	4,720,542	16,861	0.713	Indonesian rupiah (Rp) (IDR)	Indonesian see also: Languages of Indonesia	President: Prabowo Subianto
Japan	Japan 日本国; Nihon-koku	Tokyo	377,930	126,760,000	4,110,452	33,138	6,720,962	54,184	0.920	Japanese yen (¥) (JPY)	None (de jure); Japanese (de facto)	Monarch: Naruhito; Prime Minister: Sanae Takaichi
Laos	Laos; Lao People's Democratic Republic ສາທາລະນະລັດ ປະຊາທິປະໄຕ ປະຊາຊົນລາວ; Sathalanalat Paxathipatai Paxaxon Lao; République démocratique populaire lao	Vientiane	236,800	7,123,205	15,190	1,976	78,713	10,242	0.620	Lao kip (₭) (LAK)	Lao; French	General Secretary and President: Thongloun Sisoulith; Prime Minister: Sonexay Siphandone
	Malaysia مليسيا	Kuala Lumpur; Putrajaya (administrative)	330,803	32,273,000	445,519	13,315	1,305,942	39,030	0.807	Malaysian ringgit (RM) (MYR)	Malay	Monarch: Ibrahim; Prime Minister: Anwar Ibrahim
	Myanmar; Republic of the Union of Myanmar ပြည်ထောင်စု သမ္မတ မြန်မာနိုင်ငံတော် Pyidaunzu Thanmăda Myăma Nainngandaw	Naypyidaw	676,578	54,836,000	68,006	1,248	283,572	5,203	0.608	Burmese kyat (K) (MMK)	Burmese see also: Languages of Myanmar	President: Myint Swe; Chairman of the State Administration Council and Prime Minister: Min Aung Hlaing
New Zealand	New Zealand; Aotearoa	Wellington	270,467	4,786,710	257,626	48,531	285,582	53,797	0.939	New Zealand dollar ($) (NZD)	English; Māori; NZ Sign Language	Monarch: Charles III; Governor-General: Cindy Kiro; Prime Minister: Christopher Luxon
Philippines	Philippines; Republic of the Philippines; Republika ng Pilipinas	Manila	300,000	109,048,269	471,516	4,130	1,391,800	12,192	0.710	Philippine peso (₱) (PHP)	English; Filipino see also: Languages of the Philippines	President: Bongbong Marcos
Singapore	Singapore; Republic of Singapore; Republik Singapura 新加坡共和國; Xīnjiāpō Gònghéguó சிங்கப்பூர் குடியரசு Ciṅkappūr Kuṭiyaracu	Singapore (city-state)	780	5,453,600	525,230	88,447	794,179	133,737	0.949	Singapore dollar ($) (SGD)	English; Malay; Standard Chinese; Tamil	President: Tharman Shanmugaratnam; Prime Minister: Lawrence Wong
South Korea	South Korea; Republic of Korea 대한민국 大韓民國; Daehan Minguk	Seoul	100,210	51,709,098	1,760,947	34,165	3,057,995	59,330	0.929	South Korean won (₩) (KRW)	Korean; Korean Sign Language	President: Lee Jae-myung; Prime Minister: Kim Min-seok
Thailand	Thailand; Kingdom of Thailand ราชอาณาจักรไทย; Ratcha-anachak Thai	Bangkok	513,120	68,298,000	548,890	7,812	1,644,322	23,401	0.803	Thai baht (฿) (THB)	Thai	Monarch: Maha Vajiralongkorn; Prime Minister: Anutin Charnvirakul
Vietnam	Vietnam; Socialist Republic of Viet Nam; Cộng hòa Xã hội chủ nghĩa Việt Nam	Hanoi	331,699	96,208,984	465,814	4,623	1,558,898	15,470	0.726	Vietnamese đồng (₫) (VND)	Vietnamese	General Secretary of the Communist Party of Vietnam: Tô Lâm; President: Lương Cường; Prime Minister: Phạm Minh Chính

=== Ratifications ===
Country	Signatory	Ratification	Effective
Australia	15 November 2020	2 November 2021	1 January 2022
Brunei	15 November 2020	11 October 2021	1 January 2022
Cambodia	15 November 2020	15 October 2021	1 January 2022
China	15 November 2020	15 April 2021	1 January 2022
Indonesia	15 November 2020	3 November 2022	2 January 2023
Japan	15 November 2020	25 June 2021	1 January 2022
South Korea	15 November 2020	3 December 2021	1 February 2022
Laos	15 November 2020	26 October 2021	1 January 2022
Malaysia	15 November 2020	17 January 2022	18 March 2022
Myanmar	15 November 2020	4 August 2021^{1}	delayed^{1}
New Zealand	15 November 2020	2 November 2021	1 January 2022
Philippines	15 November 2020	3 April 2023	2 June 2023
Singapore	15 November 2020	9 April 2021	1 January 2022
Thailand	15 November 2020	28 October 2021	1 January 2022
Vietnam	15 November 2020	29 October 2021	1 January 2022

_{1} There were concerns expressed by the ASEAN Secretariat on the legitimacy of ratification by the then-Burmese parliament. A Thai secretary also pointed that while the Myanmar government have ratified, the Thai government is concerned about the legitimacy of the Myanmar government after the 2021 coup d'état, and whether it could meet the five-point agreement with ASEAN. Due to these concerns, Myanmar's instrument of ratification did not show on the ASEAN official website; instead Myanmar trade officials suggest that the other ASEAN members should determine whether they can accept Myanmar's ratification by themselves, and then announce their decision to the ASEAN Secretariat. Neverless, the China General Administration of Customs announced that the RCEP would enter into force between China and Myanmar on 1 May 2022.

=== Applicants ===
The trade agreement is open for new members 18 months after the partnership came into force. The following countries have applied for accession into the partnership:

- Bangladesh
- Chile: The Republic of Chile has formally requested accession to the RCEP. Claudia Sanhueza, Undersecretary of International Economic Relations, delivered the request letter to Satvinder Singh, Assistant Secretary General for the ASEAN Economic Community.
- Hong Kong (delayed)
- Sri Lanka

Potential applicants:

The following countries have been subject to media attention surrounding their potential involvement in the RCEP:

- Timor-Leste: ASEAN has signaled that its newest member Timor-Leste will join the RCEP.
- United Kingdom: The British Foreign Affairs Committee urged the UK Government to assess membership of the RCEP, as part of the UK's "Indo-Pacific tilt".
- Uruguay

== Contents ==
RCEP aims to lower tariffs, increase investment, and facilitate freer movement of goods around the region. It includes unified rules of origin throughout the bloc, which may facilitate international supply chains and trade within the region. It also prohibits certain tariffs. It does not focus on labour unions, environmental protection, or government subsidies.

The RCEP contains 20 chapters discussing trade within many sectors, including (but not restricted to):

1. Goods and services
2. Investment
3. Government Procurement
4. Standards and Technical Regulations
5. Intellectual Property Rights
6. E-Commerce

The RCEP contains tariff schedules that intend to eliminate tariffs by 92 percent over a course of 20 years. The tariff schedules include the complete elimination of tariffs and quotas on over 65% of the goods trade within the RCEP bloc. Tariff concessions included within the document will have varying effects based on different members political and economic context. For members that are already heavily liberalized, concessions will be lower than those with higher existing tariffs.

Under the RCEP there is a high level of protection within the agricultural sectors. Crops and meat products experience the highest level of protection, especially when compared to global trade dynamics outside of the RCEP. Although agriculture will still experience high levels of protection, the RCEP will have significant contributions, with a current tariff reduction of 12.8 percent occurring within 8.4% of agricultural products.

Within the manufacturing sector, motor vehicles, apparel and leather, non metallic minerals, and textiles experience the highest levels of tariff protection. Conversely, extractive products and natural resources will experience little to no protection, facing zero or near zero tariff rates.

The RCEP is not as comprehensive as the Comprehensive and Progressive Agreement for Trans-Pacific Partnership, another free trade agreement in the region that includes some of the same countries. The RCEP "does not establish unified standards on labour and the environment, or commit countries to open services and other vulnerable areas of their economies."

The tariffs schedule just for Japan is 1,334 pages long.

== Projected value ==
2020 RCEP-15's share of global GDP (%)

The combined GDP of potential RCEP members surpassed the combined GDP of Trans-Pacific Partnership (TPP) members in 2007. It was suggested that continued economic growth, particularly in China and Indonesia, could see total GDP in the original RCEP membership grow to over US$100 trillion by 2050, roughly double the project size of TPP economies. On 23 January 2017, President Donald Trump signed a memorandum withdrawing the United States from the TPP, a move which was seen to improve the chances of success for RCEP.

According to a 2020 projection, the agreement is expected to enlarge the global economy by US$186 billion. According to Peter Petri and Michael Plummer of the Brookings Institution, the RCEP could add $209 billion annually to world incomes, and $500 billion to world trade by 2030, and that "new agreements will make the economies of North and Southeast Asia more efficient, linking their strengths in technology, manufacturing, agriculture, and natural resources." According to computer simulations in a related paper also by Petri and Plummer published by the Peterson Institute for International Economics (PIIE), the RCEP will raise global national incomes in 2030 by an annual $147 billion and $186 billion respectively, "yield especially large benefits for China, Japan, and South Korea and losses for the United States and India", and "will be especially valuable because it strengthens East Asian interdependence, raising trade among members by $428 billion and reducing trade among nonmembers by $48 billion".

The simulations in Petri and Plummer's PIIE paper showed that the RCEP and the Comprehensive and Progressive Agreement for Trans-Pacific Partnership (CPTPP) would together more than offset the global negative economic effects of the China-United States trade war, but not the individual losses of China and the United States. Moreover, the incremental value of the CPTPP will be reduced by the trade war (from $147 billion to $121 billion) while the value of RCEP will be increased (from $186 billion to $209 billion). The PIIE working paper also stated that "RCEP will be economically significant with or without India, and indeed more significant than the CPTPP, with especially important benefits for China, Japan, and Korea" and that "RCEP will reorient trade and economic ties away from global linkages toward regionally focused relationships in East Asia."

According to the Asian Development Bank (ADB), the RCEP is "relatively comprehensive in coverage" and combines existing deals, which brings Asia a step closer to a region-wide trading bloc. The agreement further liberalises goods and services trade, establishes common rules of origin for all goods traded, establishes commitments regarding government procurement, and aims to establish open and competitive markets. Though the degree of liberalisation within RCEP is not as deep as in the CPTPP, RCEP members are projected to gain $174 billion in real income by 2030, equivalent to 0.4% of the members' aggregate GDP. China, Korea and Japan will benefit the most, with likely gains of $85 billion for China, $48 billion for Japan, and $23 billion for Korea. Other significant RCEP gains will accrue to Indonesia, Malaysia, Thailand, and Vietnam. Due to their RCEP membership, Japan and Korea would accrue gains amounting to 1% of their GDP while Malaysia, Thailand, Vietnam and Brunei would all accrue gains of 0.5% of GDP or higher.

New Zealand's Ministry of Foreign Affairs and Trade stated that the RCEP is projected to add $186 billion to the world economy and increase New Zealand's GDP by around $2.0 billion. The RCEP members took 56% of New Zealand's total exports, representing 61% of New Zealand's goods exports (worth $36.6 billion) and 45% of New Zealand's services exports (worth $11.8 billion). According to the ministry, "RCEP delivers improved market access for New Zealand services exporters and investors in some RCEP markets that go beyond existing FTAs. Under RCEP, New Zealand services exporters and investors will, for the first time, benefit from market access commitments from China and ASEAN countries that are not party to the CPTPP". Following the signing of the RCEP, New Zealand and China signed a deal to further expand their existing free-trade agreement. The expanded deal provides for tariffs to be either removed or cut on many of New Zealand's mostly commodities-based exports, ranging from dairy to timber and seafood, while compliance costs will also be reduced. The deal also opens up sectors such as aviation, education and finance.

Huang Qifan, former mayor of Chongqing, stated that with the implementation of RCEP, China and RCEP countries will form an increasingly close industrial chain and supply chain connection, and in the future, there will be a variety of production and marketing models such as "in China, for China", "in China, for RCEP", "in RCEP, for the world". At that time, China's large market superimposed RCEP large market, China's dual circulation superimposed RCEP great circulation, "will profoundly change the world industrial chain supply chain layout".

== RCEP and COVID-19 ==
=== Impacts of COVID-19 on RCEP members ===
The COVID-19 pandemic impacted virtually every economy, happening right as the RCEP trade deal was meant to start. The pandemic caused trade costs to increase at borders, creating barriers on trade to goods and services. According to the World Bank, issues of high fiscal debt, supply chain bottlenecks, the widening skill gap, an increase in poverty, and global supply value chain resilience were challenges in economic recovery.

Trends in pandemic responses within RCEP members mirrored global ones, with RCEP members with more developed markets having both a quicker response and recovery from economic shocks than emerging markets. This was found to be due to emerging markets lack of risk resistance, which is predicted to strengthen under regional integration under the RCEP agreement.

==== RCEP mitigation of economic shocks ====
The regional integration of RCEP will result from the contents of the agreement, including rules based trade and investment, open market access, increased economic cooperation, and having ASEAN members central to the agreement. These measures have worked to alleviate the economic shocks of the pandemic, and are expected to assist in mitigating effects of the US-China trade war on East Asia. An analysis conducted by Itakura (2022) shows positive trends in growth of GDP for all RCEP members through the 2030s.

== Asia Global Institute report: RCEP Trade 2022 ==
Trade between RCEP members in 2022 revealed post-pandemic trade dynamics and reflected the increasing integration that the RCEP intended to create. The Asia Global Institute reports that in 2022, trade between RCEP members increased by 8 percent, lagging behind trade between RCEP members and non-RCEP members with an increased 8.6% growth in trade. All members experienced a rebound in trade post COVID-19, arriving at pre-Covid trade levels by 2023.

Raw materials, such as salt, nickel, and chemicals, significantly increased in trade between RCEP members. This could be a result of both China and Indonesia being members, with China being the lead importer of nickel and Indonesia being the lead global exporter. This is also representative of the Electric Vehicle industry prevalent within RCEP members. There was a dramatic increase in tobacco exports within RCEP members of 150% in 2022, with China individually experiencing a 900% growth of exports.

Although RCEP is the first agreement to create a free trade agreement between the large economies of China, South Korea, and Japan, 2022 trends show a preference for the big three to trade with other RCEP members rather than each other. Trade volume between the big three declined between the years of 2020 to 2023 as trade between RCEP members as a conglomerate grew.

The ASEAN countries within RCEP were not observed to experience gains in trade. In 2022, 20% of ASEAN's trade occurred between ASEAN members, and 30% came from what is referred to as the non-ASEAN 5, consisting of Indonesia, Malaysia, the Philippines, Singapore, and Thailand.

== History ==
2018 RCEP-15 trade balances, in billions of U.S. dollars

2011

- In August 2011, East Asia Summit Economic Ministers welcomed a Chinese and Japanese joint 'Initiative on Speeding up the Establishment of EAFTA and CEPEA'.
- During the 19th ASEAN Summit held 14–19 November 2011 in Bali, Indonesia, the Regional Comprehensive Economic Partnership (RCEP) was introduced.

2012

- The 44th ASEAN Economic Ministers (AEM) Meeting and Related Meetings were held in Siem Reap, Cambodia, 25 August – 1 September 2012.
- Leaders at the 21st ASEAN Summit held 18–20 November 2012 in Phnom Penh, Cambodia endorsed the framework of RCEP and announced the launch of their negotiations.

2013

- The first round of RCEP negotiation was held on 9–13 May 2013 in Brunei.
- The second round of RCEP negotiation was held on 23–27 September 2013 in Brisbane, Australia.

2014

- The third round of RCEP negotiation was held on 20–24 January 2014 in Kuala Lumpur, Malaysia.
- The fourth round of RCEP negotiation was held on 31 March – 4 April 2014 in Nanning, China.
- The fifth round of RCEP negotiation was held on 21–27 June 2014 in Singapore.
- The sixth round of RCEP negotiation and related meetings was held on 1–5 December 2014 in New Delhi, India.

2015

- The seventh round of RCEP negotiation was held on 9–13 February 2015 in Bangkok, Thailand. An expert group on electronic commerce met during this round. The Asian Trade Centre (based in Singapore) submitted a proposal regarding an e-Commerce chapter and gave a presentation on the paper.
- The eighth round of RCEP negotiation was held on 5–13 June 2015 in Kyoto, Japan.
- The ninth round of RCEP negotiation was held on 3–7 August 2015 in Nay Pyi Taw, Myanmar.
- The tenth round of RCEP negotiation was held on 12–16 October 2015 in Busan, South Korea. The meetings took place at BEXCO (Busan's Convention and Exhibition Centre). This round included the first region wide stakeholder meeting (organised by the Singapore-based Asian Trade Centre) which involved an informal meeting between government officials and business representatives over lunch followed by an afternoon seminar focused on what RCEP can do to help business operate in the e-Commerce space.

2016

- The eleventh round of RCEP negotiation was held on 14–19 February 2016 in Bandar Seri Begawan, Brunei.
- The twelfth round of negotiation of RCEP was held on 17–29 April 2016 in Perth, Australia.
- The thirteenth round of RCEP negotiation was held on 12–18 June 2016 in Auckland, New Zealand.
- The fourteenth round of RCEP negotiation was held on 15–18 August 2016 in Vietnam.
- The fifteenth round of RCEP negotiation was held on 11–22 October 2016 in Tianjin, China.
- The sixteenth round of negotiations of RCEP was held on 6–10 December 2016 in Tangerang, Indonesia.

2017

- The seventeenth round of negotiations of RCEP was held on 27 February – 3 March 2017 in Kobe, Japan.
- The eighteenth round of RCEP negotiation was held on 8–12 May 2017 in Manila, Philippines.
- The nineteenth round of RCEP negotiation was held on 24–28 July 2017 in Hyderabad, India.
- The twentieth round of RCEP negotiation was held on 17–28 October 2017 in Incheon, Korea.
- The first RCEP summit was held on 14 November 2017 in Manila, Philippines.

2018

- The twenty-first round of RCEP negotiation was held on 2–9 February 2018 in Yogyakarta, Indonesia.
- The twenty-second round of RCEP negotiation was held on 28 April – 8 May 2018 in Singapore.
- The twenty-third round of RCEP negotiation was held on 17–27 July 2018 in Bangkok, Thailand.
- August–October 2018, a series of ministerial meeting in Singapore and Auckland.
- The twenty-fourth round of RCEP negotiation was held on 18–27 October 2018 in Auckland, New Zealand.
- 14 November 2018, a leaders' summit in Singapore was scheduled.

2019

- The twenty-fifth round of RCEP negotiations was held from 19 to 28 February in Bali, Indonesia.
- 2 March 2019, a ministerial meeting of RCEP trade ministers held in Cambodia. The ministers agreed to intensify engagement for the remainder of the year (including by convening more inter-sessional meetings).
- Senior officials held inter-sessional meetings starting 24 May 2019 in Bangkok, Thailand to iron out issues pertaining to the goods and services sector.
- The twenty-sixth round of RCEP negotiations was held on 3 July 2019 in Melbourne, Australia.
- The twenty-seventh round of RCEP negotiations was held in Zhengzhou, China from 22 to 31 July 2019.
- 2–3 August 2019, a ministerial meeting of RCEP trade ministers was held in Beijing, China.
- 3rd RCEP summit was held once again on 31 October – 3 November 2019 in Thailand with 35th ASEAN summit on same day.
- The twenty-eighth round of RCEP negotiations was held in Danang, Vietnam from 19 to 27 September 2019.
- India opts out of RCEP on 4 November 2019 in ASEAN+3 summit, citing, according to its view, the adverse effect the deal would have on its citizens. In light of India's departure, Japan and China called on India to rejoin the partnership.

2020

- The twenty-ninth round of RCEP negotiations was held from 20 to 24 April 2020 as a video conference, due to the current situation regarding COVID-19.
- On 30 April 2020, Joint Statement of the 29th RCEP Trade Committee (RCEP TNC) Meeting was issued.
- The thirtieth round of RCEP negotiations was held from 15 to 20 May 2020 as a video conference, due to the current situation regarding COVID-19.
- The tenth RCEP Inter-sessional Ministerial Meeting held in the form of a video conference on 23 June 2020. The officials reiterated their determination to sign the RCEP at the fourth RCEP Summit in November.
- The thirty-first round of RCEP negotiation was held on 9 July 2020 as a video conference, due to the current situation regarding COVID-19.
- The Eighth Regional Comprehensive Economic Partnership (RCEP) Ministerial Meeting was held on 27 August 2020 as a video conference, due to the current situation regarding COVID-19. The Ministers issued a Joint Media Statement welcoming the progress made towards finalising the Agreement for signature.
- The Eleventh RCEP Inter-sessional Ministerial Meeting held in the form of a video conference on 14 October 2020.
- Preparatory RCEP Ministerial Meeting held in the form of a video conference on 11 November 2020.
- The RCEP was signed on 15 November 2020, in an unusual ceremony that saw the 15 member countries participate by video link due to the COVID-19 pandemic.

2021

- On 9 April 2021, Singapore ratified RCEP agreement and deposited its instrument of ratification with the Secretary-General of ASEAN. Singapore is the first RCEP Participating Country (RPC) to complete the official ratification process.
- On 15 April 2021, China deposited the instrument of ratification with the ASEAN secretary-general, marking the completion of the ratification process for the Regional Comprehensive Economic Partnership (RCEP) Agreement.
- On 25 June 2021, Japan deposited the instrument of acceptance of the Regional Comprehensive Economic Partnership Agreement with the depositary, the Secretary-General of ASEAN.
- On 11 October 2021, Brunei Darussalam ratified the Regional Comprehensive Economic Partnership (RCEP) agreement upon depositing its instrument of ratification with the Secretary-General of ASEAN.
- On 15 October 2021, Cambodia ratified the Regional Comprehensive Economic Partnership (RCEP) agreement upon depositing its instrument of ratification with the Secretary-General of ASEAN.
- On 28 October 2021, the Permanent Mission of Thailand to ASEAN deposited the Instrument of Ratification of the Regional Comprehensive Economic Partnership (RCEP) Agreement with the Secretary-General of ASEAN.
- On 29 October 2021, Vietnam ratified the Regional Comprehensive Economic Partnership (RCEP) agreement upon depositing its instrument of ratification with the Secretary-General of ASEAN.
- On 2 November 2021, Australia and New Zealand deposited the instruments of ratification with the Secretary-General of ASEAN.
- On 3 December 2021, Republic of Korea ratified the Regional Comprehensive Economic Partnership (RCEP) agreement upon depositing its instrument of ratification with the Secretary-General of ASEAN.

2022

- On 1 January 2022, the Regional Comprehensive Economic Partnership (RCEP) agreement took effect for the first ten ratifying countries.
- On 17 January 2022, Malaysia ratified the Regional Comprehensive Economic Partnership (RCEP) agreement upon depositing its instrument of ratification with the Secretary-General of ASEAN.
- On 1 February 2022, the Regional Comprehensive Economic Partnership (RCEP) agreement took effect for Republic of Korea.
- On 21 February 2022, Brian Lo, the Director General of Trade and Industry said that Hong Kong has submitted an application to join Regional Comprehensive Economic Partnership agreement.
- On 18 March 2022, the Regional Comprehensive Economic Partnership (RCEP) agreement took effect for Malaysia.
- On 1 May 2022, the Regional Comprehensive Economic Partnership (RCEP) agreement took effect between China and Myanmar.
- On 3 November 2022, Indonesia ratified the Regional Comprehensive Economic Partnership (RCEP) agreement upon depositing its instrument of ratification with the Secretary-General of ASEAN.

2023

- On 2 January 2023, the Regional Comprehensive Economic Partnership (RCEP) agreement took effect for Indonesia.
- On 3 April 2023, Philippines ratified the Regional Comprehensive Economic Partnership (RCEP) agreement upon depositing its instrument of ratification with the Secretary-General of ASEAN.
- On 2 June 2023, the Regional Comprehensive Economic Partnership (RCEP) agreement took effect for Philippines.

2024

- In June 2024, Chief Executive John Lee said that Hong Kong's RCEP application has been delayed due to political matters.

== Reactions ==
=== Positive ===
When the RCEP was signed, Chinese premier Li Keqiang declared it "a victory of multilateralism and free trade". Singaporean prime minister Lee Hsien Loong called it "a major step forward for our region" and a sign of support for free trade and economic interdependence. Vietnamese prime minister Nguyễn Xuân Phúc said the RCEP will be conducive to economic recovery and bring prosperity to enterprises and people in all countries concerned. Cambodian Prime Minister Hun Sen stated that the RCEP has great potential to address major challenges as well as has a crucial role in maintaining prosperity and political stability in the region.

Several analysts predicted that it would help stimulate the economies of signatory states amid the COVID-19 pandemic, as well as "pull the economic centre of gravity back towards Asia, with China poised to take the lead in writing trade rules for the region", leaving the U.S. behind in economic and political affairs.

Mohamed Azmin Ali, Minister of International Trade and Industry of Malaysia, said the RCEP would encourage local businesses to enter global markets and would increase Malaysia's exports. He stated that RCEP signatories would enjoy preferential treatment due to the removal of tariff and non-tariff trade barriers.

Joko Widodo, President of Indonesia, stated that the signing of the RCEP was a historic day that signalled Indonesia's strong commitment to multilateralism. Agus Suparmanto, Indonesian Minister of Trade, said that the RCEP could boost Indonesia's exports to signatory countries by 8-11% and boost investment into Indonesia by 18-22%, and expressed confidence that the trade pact would benefit Indonesian business.

Hiroaki Nakanishi, Chairman of the Japan Business Federation, said the RCEP will help expand trade and investment in the region, and will bring further prosperity and stability, which is very important for achieving a free and open international economic order.

Moon Jae-in, the President of South Korea, praised the RCEP as an unprecedented mega regional trading agreement and expressed confidence that it will "contribute to the recovery of multilateralism and the development of free trade around the world, beyond the region". Moon also stated that he expects the RCEP to open the world's biggest e-commerce market. The Korean Chamber of Commerce and Industry welcomed the conclusion of the RCEP, expecting that it would "expand a new free trade bloc and serve as the basis for revitalizing the Asia-Pacific regional economic markets". The RCEP will benefit Korean companies by removing tariffs on several Korean imports in signatory states, especially in steel, automobiles and electronics.

Kishore Mahbubani, Singapore's former permanent representative to the United Nations and former President of the United Nations Security Council, stated that the "future of Asia will be written in four letters, RCEP" and that India did a major geopolitical favour to China by withdrawing from the RCEP, just as the United States did by withdrawing from the CPTPP. Mahbubani added that with India and the United States absent, "a massive economic ecosystem centered on China is evolving in the region".

According to Peter Petri and Michael Plummer at the Brookings Institution, the agreement represented "a triumph of ASEAN's middle-power diplomacy" and would lead to significant increases in world incomes and trade by 2030, even though it "says nothing at all about labor, the environment, or state-owned enterprises". They added, "However, ASEAN-centered trade agreements tend to improve over time."

=== Criticism ===
In 2016, the Electronic Frontier Foundation described the first draft of RCEP's intellectual property provisions as containing "quite simply the worst provisions on copyright ever seen in a trade agreement". They praised the second draft for removing some of the most problematic provisions similar to the ones in the Trans-Pacific Partnership, but described as unnecessary the new broadcasting rights provision, which gives broadcasters exclusive control over content that has been broadcast, even if they do not hold any copyright in said content. They wrote that a prohibition on reproduction of broadcast content was "such an extreme proposal that it is currently considered off the table" in the proposed Protection of Broadcasts and Broadcasting Organisations Treaty.

India pulled out of the deal in November 2019, primarily due to concerns of dumping of manufactured goods from China and agricultural and dairy products from Australia and New Zealand, potentially affecting its own domestic industrial and farming sectors. Due to India's withdrawal, there are concerns that China may dominate RCEP. ASEAN leaders stated that India was welcome to return and join the bloc. Any other state may join RCEP 18 months after it comes into force.

The Wall Street Journal reported in November 2019 that the tariff-related liberalisations from RCEP would be modest, calling it a "paper tiger". A comprehensive study into the deal shows that it would add just 0.08% to China's 2030 GDP without India's participation.

Human rights groups said RCEP could negatively affect small farmers, lead to more land conflicts, and make workers in poorer countries worse off. Rashmi Banga, a senior economist at UNCTAD, said that implementing RCEP at a time of crisis will make poorer countries in Southeast Asia even more vulnerable, adding, "Most Asean nations will see rising imports and declining exports. That will worsen their balance of trade and weaken their fiscal position."

Former Australian prime minister Malcolm Turnbull said that despite the "hoopla", the RCEP was "a really low-ambition trade deal that we shouldn't kid ourselves on", adding, "It's a very old fashioned trade deal. It's low ambition. It's been affected largely for strategic reasons."

CNBC reported that the economic benefits from RCEP would be modest and could take years to materialise, with analysts from Citi suggesting that RCEP was "a coup for China" non-economically. The Citi report also said that India is one of the biggest losers from RCEP, adding, "exclusion will likely make India less attractive as an alternative production base versus ASEAN."

Indian external affairs minister Subrahmanyam Jaishankar said it is not in India's interest to join the RCEP, as the trade deal would have "fairly immediate negative consequences" for India's economy. Zia Haq, associate editor at Hindustan Times, said India has "rightly shunned" the RCEP because at the moment it cannot take advantage of free-trade agreements. He went on to say, "India fears the RCEP will also limit its policy-making room in areas such as foreign investment." He said that according to some analysts, there will be limited gains from the RCEP without India, which is Asia's second-largest economy.

Yen Huai-shing, deputy director at the Chung-Hua Institution for Economic Research, wrote on Taipei Times that the RCEP is "not to have a strong impact" on Taiwan. She said that most observers did not expect the RCEP to provide a high degree of openness, and that it provides no dispute settlement mechanism when handling certain trade issues such as meat inspection regulations, adding, "In other words, they are more symbolic than binding."

According to Patricia Ranald at the Australian Institute of International Affairs, RCEP has limited gains from trade and ignores labour, human rights, and environmental sustainability issues. She said, "Despite claims about the benefits of common standards, the RCEP has no commitments to internationally recognised labour rights and environmental standards which Australia and other RCEP governments have endorsed through the United Nations and the International Labour Organization."

The Center for Environmental Concerns outlined the harmful environmental implications of increased trade within the RPEC bloc. The CEC states that the lack of provisions on environmentally critical activities and areas will affect data collection and information dissemination critical to environmentally dependent activities. The CEC expresses concern that extractive resource industries experiencing near-zero tariff levels will increase in competition, leading to a higher demand for timber, with devastating effects of deforestation and habitat destruction.

The CEC also finds that increased trade resulting from RPEC will lead to an increased demand in energy and emissions, with the RPEC containing no provisions promoting the use of renewable energy. Concerns of increasing emissions follow from predictions of energy intensive sectors (steel, cement, and chemicals) becoming more competitive, as well as an increasing use of fossil fuels to sustain production and transportation processes.

The lack of environmental provisions have also prompted scientists to estimate the impacts of trade within the RCEP bloc on emissions contributing to climate change. In 2018, almost 40% of global emissions resulted from RCEP member countries. As RCEP is expected to increase trade and benefit all members, it is also expected to increase emission production. It is estimated that a tariff reduction on all goods traded within the RCEP could result in RCEP members being responsible for 75.4 percent of increased global emissions.

Salvatore Babones commented on Foreign Policy that, by 2030, the world's economy would be expected to grow around 40% and the RCEP may add 0.2% to it, the scale of a "rounding error". He said that some main exports to China, such as Japan's machinery and Australia's iron ore, are already tariff-free. Babones said that with the signing of RCEP, "China may score propaganda points by posing as the guardian of the international system, but the system itself is increasingly bypassing China."

Some analysts and economists said the RCEP is unlikely to benefit its developing member countries in the short term. Kate Lappin, Asia Pacific regional secretary at Public Services International, said that the pact has no provisions for improving labour rights, adding, "The agreement might not be good for governments and workers, but still deliver profits for foreign investors."

== See also ==
- Comprehensive Economic Partnership for East Asia (CEPEA)
- Comprehensive and Progressive Agreement for Trans-Pacific Partnership (CPTPP)
- Asian values
- East Asian Community
- East Asia Summit
- Free-trade area
- Free Trade Area of the Asia-Pacific (FTAAP)
- Market access
- Pan-Asianism
- South Asian Free Trade Area
- Trans-Pacific Partnership
- Indo-Pacific Economic Framework (IPEF)
- Craiova Group
- Open Balkan
- CEFTA
