= Protocol on Trade Negotiations =

The Protocol on Trade Negotiations (PTN) is a preferential trade agreement signed on 9 December 1971 with the aim of increasing trade between developing countries in the framework of the General Agreement on Tariffs and Trade. Its entry into force was on 11 February 1973 and its notification to the WTO on 9 November 1971.

== Signatories ==
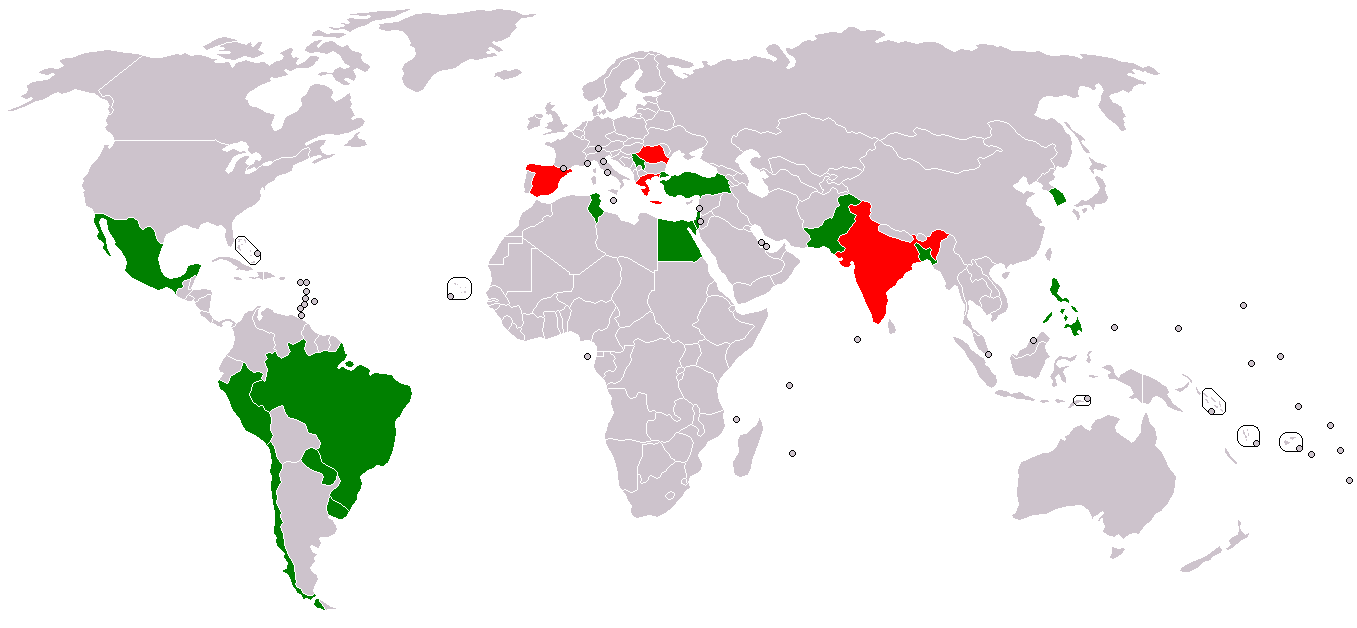
Signatories Former signatories

Original signatories currently applying the agreement are: Bangladesh, Brazil, Chile, Egypt, Israel, South Korea, Mexico, Pakistan, Paraguay, Peru, Philippines, Serbia, Tunisia, Turkey, Uruguay.

Former signatories are: Greece (from 9 December 1971 until 1980), India (from 9 December 1971), Romania (from 9 December 1971 until 2006), Spain (from 9 December 1971 until 1985)
