= China–Peru Free Trade Agreement =

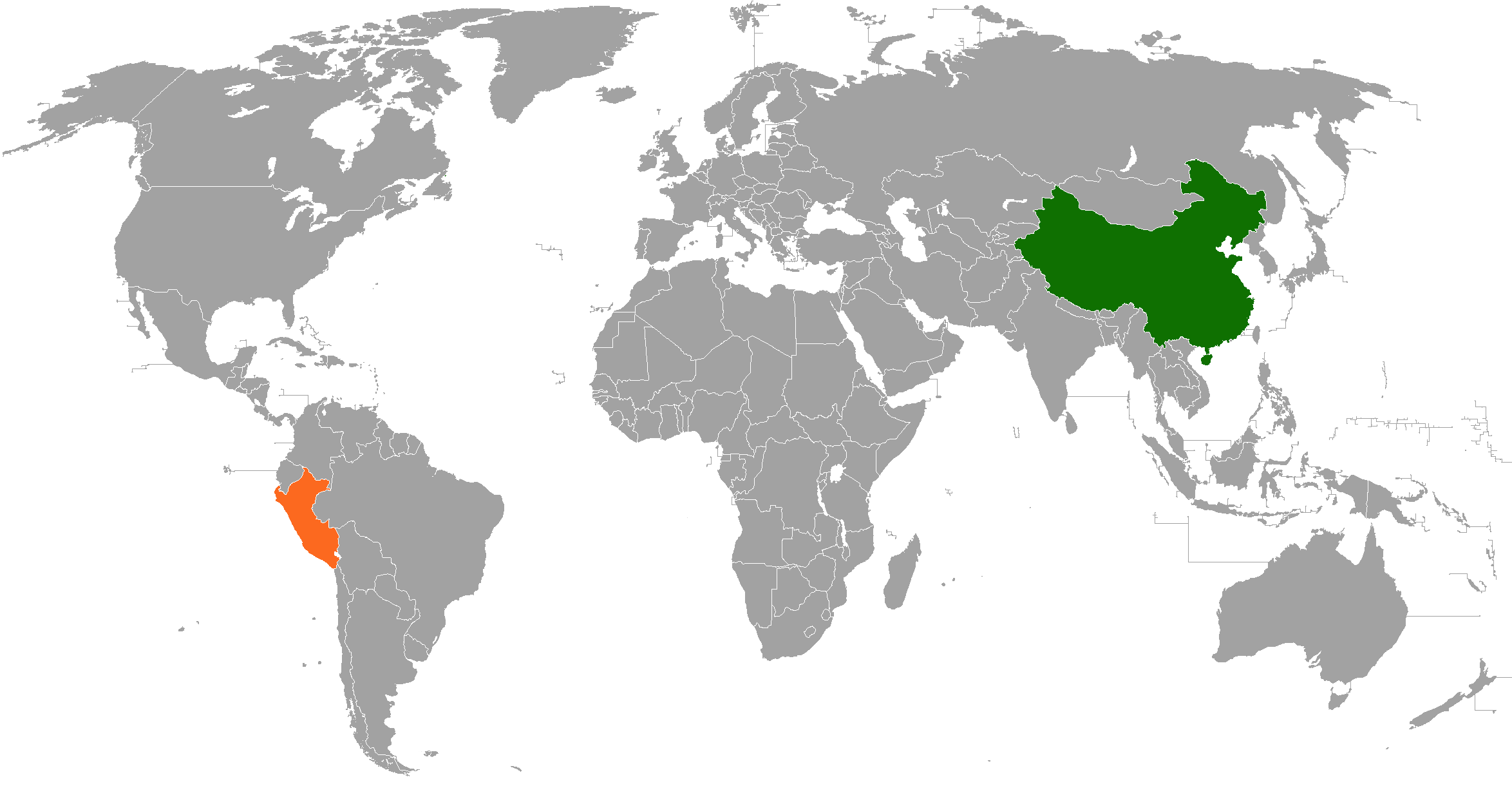

The China–Peru Free Trade Agreement (Spanish: Tratado de Libre Comercio Perú – China) is a bilateral free trade agreement designed to eliminate obstacles to trade and investment between China and Peru. The two sides concluded talks in November 2008 and signed the agreement in April 2009. The agreement was officially ratified by both countries governments on December 6, 2009, and came into effect on March 1, 2010.

The idea of such a trade agreement was first formally proposed by the Peruvian Minister of Trade, Mercedes Aráoz, to her Chinese counterpart, Bo Xilai, on November 18, 2006, during the 2006 APEC summit. In February 2007, both ministers agreed to the realization of a feasibility study, which was successfully completed six months later. On September 7, 2007, during the 2007 APEC summit, the presidents of China, Hu Jintao, and Peru, Alan García announced the formal start of negotiations. The first round of negotiations was carried out in Lima between January 20 and January 23, 2008; the second round took place in Beijing between March 3 and March 7 of the same year. The third round was carried out in May, also in Beijing. On November 19, 2008, President Alan Garcia announced that both sides have concluded trade pact talks and that the deal would be signed in the coming months.

China is the second most important trade partner for Peru; as of 2006, it accounted for 9.6% of Peruvian exports and 10.3% of Peruvian imports for a trade volume of $US5.5 billion in 2007 On the other hand, Chinese investments are still small; as of 2006 companies headquartered in the People's Republic of China accounted for only 1.5% of foreign direct investment in Peru. Under the agreement, 10 percent of Peruvian products such as textiles, clothing and shoes were excluded from the deal, while only 1 percent of Chinese products — wood and tobacco — were left out, said Eduardo Ferreyros, Peruvian foreign trade vice minister. The proposed China — Peru trade agreement has drawn criticism in Peru from some economic sectors that feel threatened by Chinese competition; this is the case of the textile industry which claims that the low wages paid by their Chinese counterparts represent an unfair advantage. As an alternative, these sectors have proposed the exclusion of products such as textiles from the agreement or long periods to phase out tariffs on them.

== See also ==
- Economy of China
- Economy of Peru

== Bibliography ==
- Cardenal, Juan Pablo; Araújo, Heriberto (2011). La silenciosa conquista china (in Spanish). Barcelona: Crítica. pp. 107–114. ISBN 9788498922578.
