= ASEAN–China Free Trade Area =

Asian free-trade area

- ASEAN–China Free Trade Area

Chinese name
- Simplified Chinese: 中国―东盟自由贸易区
- Traditional Chinese: 中國─東盟自由貿易區
Transcriptions
Standard Mandarin
- Hanyu Pinyin: Zhōngguó-Dōngméng Zìyóu Màoyì Qū
- IPA: [ʈʂʊ́ŋkwǒ tʊ́ŋmə̌ŋ tsɹ̩̂jǒʊ mâʊî tɕʰý]

Vietnamese name
- Vietnamese alphabet: Khu vực mậu dịch tự do Trung Quốc – ASEAN

Indonesian name
- Indonesian: Kawasan Perdagangan Bebas ASEAN-Tiongkok

The ASEAN–China Free Trade Area (ACFTA) is a free-trade area among the eleven member states of the Association of Southeast Asian Nations (ASEAN) and the People's Republic of China.

== History ==
China first proposed the idea of a free trade area in November 2000. Leaders of ASEAN and China thus decided to explore measures aimed at economic integration within the region In Brunei the following year, they endorsed the establishment of an ASEAN–China Free Trade Area.

The framework agreement was signed on 4 November 2002 in Phnom Penh, Cambodia, by eleven heads of government.: Hassanal Bolkiah (Sultan of Brunei Darussalam), Hun Sen (Prime Minister of Cambodia), Megawati Soekarnoputri (President of Indonesia), Bounnhang Vorachith (Prime Minister of Laos), Mahathir Mohamad (Prime Minister of Malaysia), Than Shwe (Prime Minister of Burma), Gloria Macapagal Arroyo (President of the Philippines), Goh Chok Tong (Prime Minister of Singapore), Thaksin Shinawatra (Prime Minister of Thailand), Phan Văn Khải (Prime Minister of Vietnam), Zhu Rongji (Premier of the State Council of the People's Republic of China).

The first stage implied the 6 first signatories who engaged in the elimination of their tariffs on 90% of their products by 2010. Between 2003 and 2008, trade with ASEAN grew from US$59.6 billion to US$192.5 billion. China's transformation into a major economic power in the 21st century has led to an increase of foreign investments in the bamboo network, a network of overseas Chinese businesses operating in the markets of Southeast Asia that share common family and cultural ties. ASEAN members and the People's Republic of China had a combined nominal gross domestic product of approximately US$6 trillion in 2008.

Once the 6 first signatories accomplished their goal by 2010, the CLMV countries (Cambodia, Lao PDR, Myanmar, Vietnam) engaged in the same policy on tariffs, with the same goal to achieve by 2015. In 2010, the ASEAN–China Free Trade Area became the largest free trade area in terms of population and third largest in terms of nominal GDP. It was also the third largest trade volume after the European Economic Area and the North American Free Trade Area.

On 1 January 2010, the average tariff rate on Chinese goods sold in ASEAN countries decreased from 12.8 to 0.6 percent pending implementation of the free trade area by the remaining ASEAN members. Meanwhile, the average tariff rate on ASEAN goods sold in China decreased from 9.8 to 0.1 percent. By 2015, ASEAN's total merchandise trade with China reached $346.5 billion (15.2% of ASEAN's trade), and the ACFTA accelerated the growth of direct investments from China and commercial cooperation.

In November 2022, China and ASEAN jointly announced the official start of the China-ASEAN FTA 3.0 negotiations. This agreement will encompass the following areas: trade in goods, investment, digital economy, and green economy. The initial round of consultations regarding the China-ASEAN FTA 3.0 negotiations was initiated on February 7, 2023. The Substantial conclusion of the China-ASEAN FTA 3.0 negotiations is proclaimed in Vientiane, Laos, on October 10, 2024.

== Description ==
Amendments for the framework of the free trade area mostly concerned Vietnam. These amendments were designed to assist Vietnam lower tariffs and put forth dates as guidelines.

The free trade agreement reduced tariffs on 7,881 product categories, or 90 percent of imported goods, to zero. This reduction took effect in China and the six original members of ASEAN: Brunei, Indonesia, Malaysia, the Philippines, Singapore and Thailand. The remaining four countries were supposed to follow suit in 2015.

== Signatories ==
Flag	Country	Capital	Area (km^{2})	Population (2017, U.N. data)	GDP (nominal) (bln USD, 2017, IMF)	Currency	Official languages
(Brunei)	Brunei Darussalam	Bandar Seri Begawan	5,765	428,697	11.9	dollar	Malay
(Cambodia)	Cambodia	Phnom Penh	181,035	16,005,373	22.2	riel	Khmer
(Indonesia)	Indonesia	Jakarta	1,904,569	263,991,379	1,015.4	rupiah	Indonesian
(Laos)	Laos	Vientiane	236,800	6,858,160	17.1	kip	Lao
(Malaysia)	Malaysia	Kuala Lumpur	329,847	31,624,264	314.4	ringgit	Malay, English
(Myanmar)	Myanmar (Burma)	Naypyidaw	676,578	53,370,609	66.5	kyat	Burmese
(Philippines)	Philippines	Manila	300,000	104,918,090	313.4	peso	Filipino, English
(Singapore)	Singapore	Singapore	707.1	5,708,844	323.9	dollar	Malay, Mandarin, English, Tamil
(Thailand)	Thailand	Bangkok	513,115	69,037,513	445.3	baht	Thai
(Timor-Leste)	Timor-Leste	Dili	14,874	1,296,311	1.28	dollar	Tetum, Portuguese
(Vietnam)	Vietnam	Hanoi	331,690	95,540,800	220.4	đồng	Vietnamese
(China)	People's Republic of China	Beijing	9,640,821	1,409,517,397	12,014.6	renminbi	Mandarin

Members of the ASEAN have a combined population of more than 650 million. Indonesia accounts for more than 40 percent of the region's population, and its people have voiced the greatest amount of opposition to the agreement.

== See also ==
- ASEAN Free Trade Area
- Chiang Mai Initiative
- Comprehensive Economic Partnership for East Asia
- Economic Cooperation Framework Agreement (between ROC and PRC)
- List of free trade agreements
- ASEAN–India Free Trade Area (AIFTA)
- Bamboo network
- Nanning-Singapore Economic Corridor
- Rules of Origin
- Market access
- Free-trade area
- China and Southeast Asia in the Xi Jinping Era
