= Dorothy Tembo =

Zambian economist (born 1961)

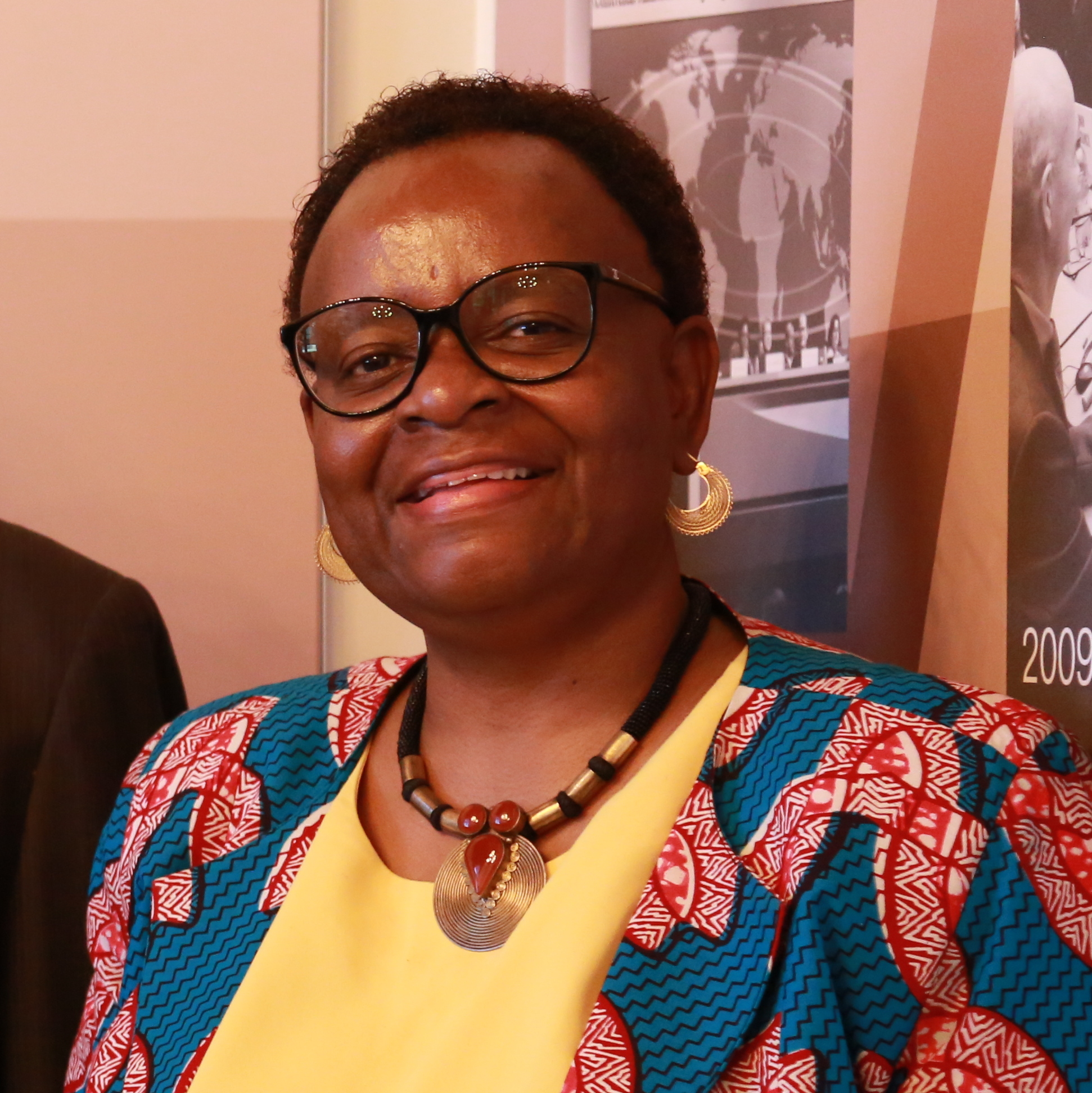

Deputy Executive Director of the International Trade Centre
- Incumbent
- Assumed office July 2014
- Preceded by: Jean-Marie Paugam

Executive Director of the Enhanced Integrated Framework
- In office October 2008 – October 2013
- Succeeded by: Ratnakar Adhikari

Personal details
- Born: Dorothy Ng’ambi Tembo; 28 December 1961 (age 64) Lusaka, Zambia
- Education: University of Zambia

Dorothy (Ng’ambi) Tembo (born 28 December 1961) is a Zambian economist and trade and development expert. She is the deputy executive director of the International Trade Centre (ITC), a joint agency of the United Nations and the World Trade Organization.

Tembo served as the executive director of the Enhanced Integrated Framework from October 2008 until October 2013. She has also held several senior positions in the Government of Zambia, notably as Chief Trade Negotiator and Director of Foreign Trade in the Ministry of Commerce, Trade and Industry of Zambia from 2004 until 2008.

== Early life and education ==
Tembo was born in 1961 in Lusaka, Zambia. She grew up in the Zambian capital with her six siblings, where her parents worked as educationalists. Tembo attended Roma Girls’ Secondary School and proceeded to the University of Zambia, where she obtained a Degree in Economics with African Development Studies. She has also completed a number of post graduate and skills building initiatives.

== Career ==
Tembo joined the Zambian civil service in 1985 as an economist in the National Commission for Development Planning. In 1990 she joined Meridien Biao Bank where she was in charge of operations for one of its largest branches.

In 1995, Tembo returned to the public sector as a Senior Economist responsible for regional integration programmes in the Ministry of Commerce, Trade and Industry.

From 2000 until 2003, Tembo served as Deputy Team Leader on a USAID RAPID project in Gaborone, Botswana, supporting member states of the Southern African Development Community (SADC) in the implementation of the SADC Trade Protocol.

In 2003 and 2004, Tembo served as a Trade and Investment Advisor on the USAID-funded Zambia Trade and Investment Enhancement Project (ZAMTIE) project in Lusaka, providing support to the Ministry of Commerce, Trade and Industry and the private sector.

In May 2004, the then President of the Republic of Zambia, Levy Mwanawasa appointed Tembo as Zambia’s Chief Trade Negotiator and Director of Foreign Trade in the Ministry of Commerce, Trade and Industry. One of her key responsibilities during this period was to lead the Zambian technical team in its capacity as coordinator of the group of Least Developed Countries (LDCs) during the World Trade Organization Ministerial Conference of 2005. Among the agreements reached in Hong Kong was the decision to extend duty and quota-free market access to LDCs and the Aid-for-Trade agenda, an initiative that seeks to place a spotlight on the role of trade related capacity building in supporting growth and sustainable development with the aim of ensuring for poverty reduction. A key feature of this was the establishment of the Enhanced Integrated Framework, a multi-donor initiative hosted by the WTO.

Tembo was in 2008 appointed to lead the Enhanced Integrated Framework by then WTO Director-General Pascal Lamy. During her tenure as executive director of the Enhanced Integrated Framework, from October 2008 to October 2013, Tembo spearheaded the establishment of the initiative (formerly the Integrated Framework), which sought to address the trade-related technical assistance needs and supply side constraints of the Least Developed Countries.

Tembo oversaw the effort of making the Enhanced Integrated Framework operational in 2010. By 30 April 2012, the initiative was supported by a multi-donor trust fund with paid-up capital of $165 million. During this period Tembo led the resource mobilisation and outreach efforts and managed the implementation of wide-ranging projects in the LDCs.

In June 2014, Tembo was appointed deputy executive director of the International Trade Centre. During this period she led the operations of ITC, including oversight of project delivery, resource mobilisation and project and financial management. In partnership with former Executive Director Arancha Gonzalez, she helped pilot the launch of a number of initiatives including the SheTrades initiative, the ITC’s first annual flagship publication on SME Competitiveness, ITC’s Innovation Lab, and programmes on youth and trade, assistance for implementation of the WTO Trade Facilitation Agreement, and Investment Facilitation for Development.

From January 2020 to June 2020 she was appointed as Acting Executive Director, responsible for overseeing all aspects of the operational and strategic focus of the organisation’s delivery of trade-related technical assistance to developing countries with a focus on achieving the Sustainable Development Goals. Over 80% of the delivery is to priority countries in sub-Saharan Africa, Least developed countries (LDCs), Landlocked developing countries (LLDCs), Small, vulnerable economies (SVEs), Small Island Developing States, and fragile and post-conflict economies.

She is currently serving as deputy executive director.

== Other activities ==
International Gender Champions (IGC), champion.

== Political positions ==
Tembo is known as a leading advocate of African integration and vocal supporter of the African Continental Free Trade Area agreement. On the global stage, she has voiced strong support for the multilateral system, regional integration and women’s empowerment.

== Personal details ==
Tembo is a gardener and a mentor of young women. She has a daughter and a son. Tembo speaks English, as well as Tumbuka, Bemba and Nyanja and has a good working knowledge of French.
