= UNNExT =

Trade organisation in Asia and the Pacific

The United Nations Network of Experts for Paperless Trade and Transport in Asia and the Pacific (UNNExT) is a community of trade facilitation specialists and practitioners focusing on simplifying import, export and transit procedures by enabling traders and governments to exchange information electronically and through automated and integrated systems, including national and regional Single window. The Network has made significant contributions to the development of trade facilitation and paperless trade in the region.

== History and evolution ==
Launched by the United Nations Economic and Social Commission for Asia and the Pacific in cooperation with United Nations Economic Commission for Europe in 2009, early work of the Community focused on building capacity of developing countries on fundamental issues associated with single window and paperless trade system development, such as business process analysis of trade procedures, data harmonization, and legal framework development.

Initially referred to as the UN Network of Experts for Paperless Trade in Asia-Pacific “Transport” was added to the full name of the network in 2014 in recognition of the importance of transit facilitation and transport-related procedures for the many landlocked developing countries members of ESCAP, particularly those in Central Asia. Taking into account the importance of small and medium-sized enterprises and agriculture for the sustainable and inclusive development of the region, recent work of the Network has increasingly focused on these two sectors since 2012.

With the growing interest and investment of Governments in the development of national single window and related paperless trade systems, addressing the issue of system interoperability and the need to enable electronic exchange and legal recognition of data and documents across borders has become more pressing. A UNNExT Advisory Group dedicated to this issue was set up in 2013 and provided significant support in the development of the “Framework Agreement on Facilitation of Cross-Border Paperless Trade in Asia and the Pacific”, a new United Nations treaty open for signature to 53 ESCAP member states starting 1 October 2016.

The continuous demand for capacity building on paperless trade and trade facilitation has led the network to develop online training and certification programmes, with a first e-learning series on "Business Process Analysis for Trade Facilitation" launched in 2015.

As emphasized in the UNNExT-supported 7th Asia-Pacific Trade Facilitation Forum held in Wuhan, China in 2015, there are strong linkages between paperless trade and e-commerce and future work of the network is expected to address procedural bottlenecks to cross-border e-commerce.
