= Arancha González Laya =

Spanish politician and foreign minister

The Most Excellent Arancha González Laya
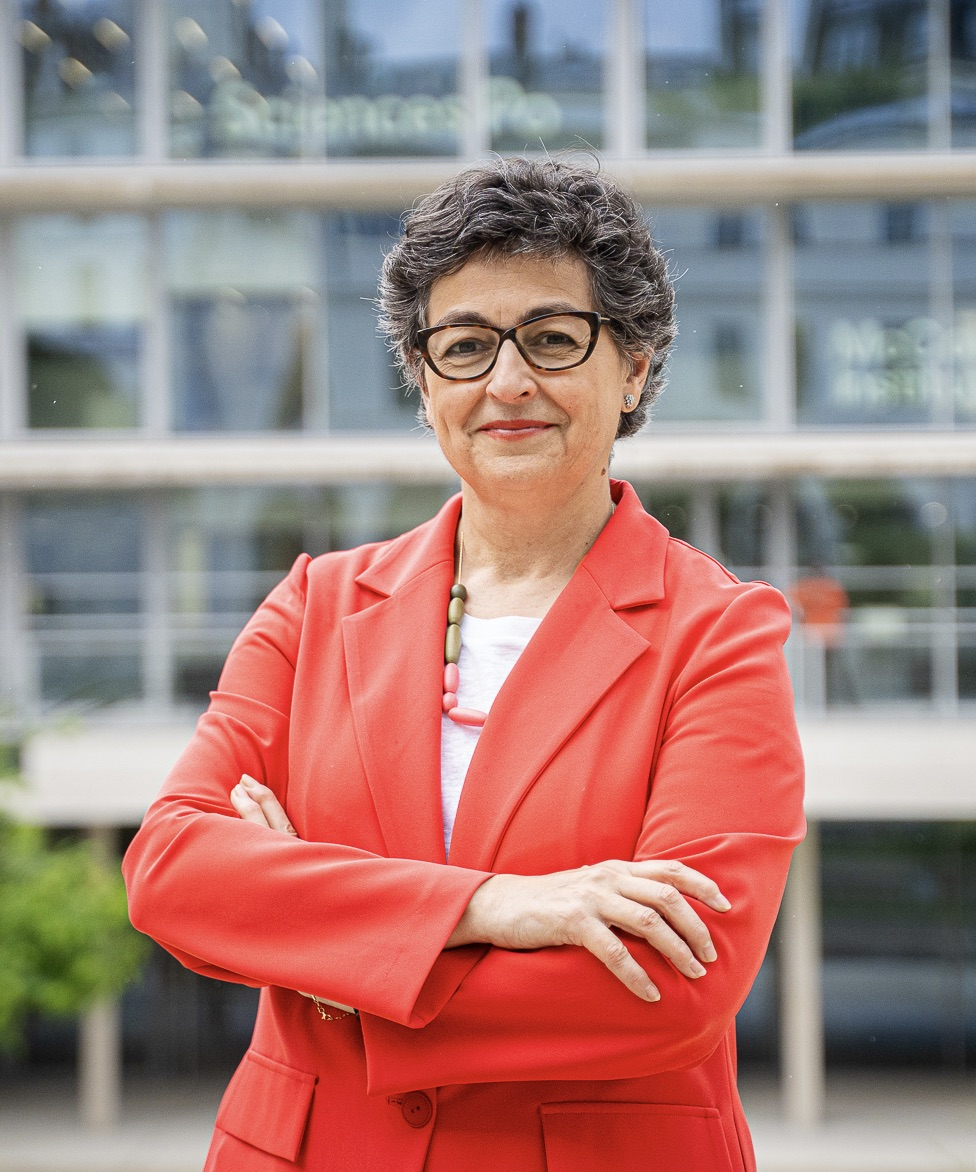
- Arancha Gonzalez in May 2024

Dean of the Paris School of International Affairs
- Incumbent
- Assumed office 1 March 2022
- Preceded by: Enrico Letta

Minister of Foreign Affairs, European Union and Cooperation
- In office 13 January 2020 – 12 July 2021
- Prime Minister: Pedro Sánchez
- Preceded by: Margarita Robles (acting)
- Succeeded by: José Manuel Albares

Executive Director of the International Trade Centre
- In office September 2013 – 13 January 2020
- Preceded by: Patricia Francis
- Succeeded by: Pamela Coke-Hamilton

Personal details
- Born: María Aránzazu González Laya; 22 May 1969 (age 57) San Sebastián, Spain
- Education: University of Navarra; Carlos III University of Madrid

María Aránzazu "Arancha" González Laya (born 22 May 1969) is a Spanish lawyer who served as Minister of Foreign Affairs, European Union and Cooperation in the Spanish government of Prime Minister Pedro Sánchez from 2020 to 2021. Currently, González is the dean of the Paris School of International Affairs at the elite French university Sciences Po.

Earlier in her career, González served as assistant Secretary-General of the United Nations and the executive director of the International Trade Centre, a joint agency of the United Nations and the World Trade Organization from August 2013 until January 2020.

== Early life and education ==
Born in San Sebastián on 22 May 1969, González Laya grew up in the Basque municipality of Tolosa. She graduated in law from the University of Navarre and has a postgraduate degree in European law from Carlos III University of Madrid.

== Career ==
=== Career in the private sector ===
González Laya began her career in the private sector as an associate at German law firm Bruckhaus Westrick Stegemann in Brussels, advising companies on trade, competition and state aid matters.

=== Career in the public sector ===
Between 2002 and 2005 González Laya was the European Commission's spokeswoman for trade and adviser to the European Commissioner for Trade Pascal Lamy. She subsequently served in various capacities in the Commission in the area of international trade and external relations, including negotiations of trade agreements between the EU and Mercosur, Iran, the Gulf Cooperation Council, the Balkans and Mediterranean countries.

González Laya served as Chief of Staff to Pascal Lamy in his role as WTO Director General between 2005 and 2013. In that capacity she was intimately involved in setting up the WTO's Aid for Trade initiative as well as the Enhanced Integrated Framework, a joint venture of several international organisations helping to build trade capacity in the world's poorest countries. She served as the WTO Director-General's representative (Sherpa) at the G-20.

During her tenure as Executive Director of the International Trade Centre, González Laya spearheaded global efforts to empower women economically. This included the launch in 2015 of the SheTrades Initiative, which aims to connect three million women entrepreneurs to market by 2021. She also played a leading role in the adoption of the Buenos Aires Declaration on Women and Trade at the 11th Ministerial Conference of the World Trade Organization, held in Buenos Aires, Argentina, in December 2017. In 2019, González co-edited "Women Shaping Global Economic Governance", a collection of essays by 28 women leaders from across the globe.

In 2014, González Laya launched the first Trade for Sustainable Development Forum, gathering public and private sectors in an effort to drive the debate on the greening of trade and addressing trade and climate change. The 6th edition of the Trade for Sustainable Forum was held on 7–9 October 2019.

=== Minister of Foreign Affairs, European Union and Cooperation ===
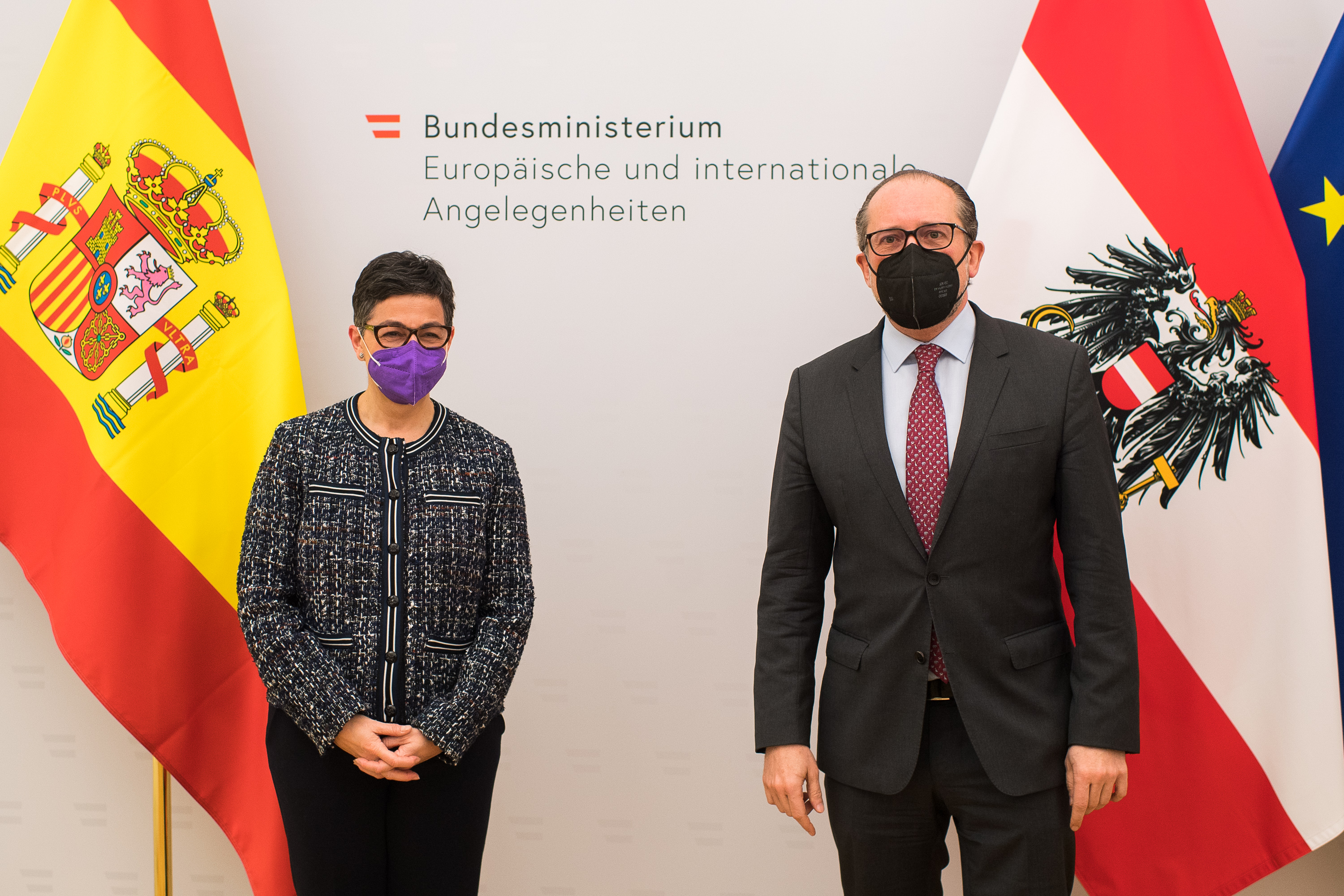
González Laya with Austrian Foreign Minister Alexander Schallenberg, 12 March 2021

On 13 January 2020 González Laya was sworn in Minister of Foreign Affairs, European Union and Cooperation in the Sánchez Second Cabinet, succeeding Margarita Robles as acting Minister.

In May 2020, some media echoed rumors implying González Laya would be the favorite to lead the World Trade Organization (WTO) following the announcement that the Director-General, Roberto Azevêdo, would resign in August 2020; by July, she ruled out any candidacy for the role.

In December 2020, González Laya said that Spain welcomed the normalization of relations between Morocco and Israel, but reminded that the issue of Western Sahara remained to be settled within the United Nations.

On 31 December 2020, González Laya reached an agreement in principle with the United Kingdom regarding Gibraltar, amid the end of the Brexit transition period.

In 2021, González Laya presented a new "Strategy on Foreign Action", the blueprint for Spain's foreign policy for the next three years.

In July 2021, González Laya was replaced with José Manuel Albares in a cabinet reshuffle affecting five other posts.

In September 2021, European Commissioner Paolo Gentiloni appointed González Laya as chair of the Wise Persons Group on Challenges Facing the Customs Union.

=== Dean of the Paris School of International Affairs, 2022–present ===
On 18 February Sciences Po appointed González Laya as Dean of the Paris School of International Affairs effective 1 March 2022. She is the first woman to hold this position. PSIA keeps its second place worldwide in "Politics & International Studies" for the second year in the 2021 QS World University Rankings.

== Other activities ==
- Bertelsmann Stiftung, Member of the Board of Trustees (since 2023)
- German Council on Foreign Relations (DGAP), Member of the Advisory Council (since 2023)
- Munich Security Conference, Member of the Advisory Council (since 2023)
- European Council on Foreign Relations (ECFR), Member (since 2021)
- Africa Europe Foundation (AEF), Member of the High-Level Group of Personalities on Africa-Europe Relations (since 2020)
- Centre for European Reform (CER), Member of the Advisory Board
- Elcano Royal Institute for International and Strategic Studies, Member of the Board of Trustees
- GLOBSEC, Member of the International Advisory Council
- International Gender Champions (IGC), Chair of the Global Advisory Board (since 2019)
- International Trade Centre (ITC), chair of the advisory board on Trade and Investment Support Institutions
- Mo Ibrahim Foundation, Member of the Advisory Council
- Paris School of International Affairs (PSIA), Member of the Strategic Committee
- World Economic Forum (WEF), Co-chair of the Global Future Council on the Future of International Trade and Investment
- EU-Africa High-level group, member
- Broadband Commission for Sustainable Development, commissioner

== Political positions ==
González has been an advocate for Spanish unity and dialogue on the Catalan independence issue.

== Personal life ==
González has taught extensively on trade and development, including at the College of Europe (Bruges), the IELPO (Barcelona), the World Trade Institute (WTI) and the Shanghai Institute of Foreign Trade. She speaks six languages: Spanish, Basque, English, French, German and Italian. Her hobbies include trekking and arts.

Political offices
Preceded by Margarita Robles; Acting	Minister of Foreign Affairs; 2020–2021	Succeeded by José Manuel Albares
