= Trade costs and facilitation =

Ongoing World Bank research project on trade facilitation reform

Trade Costs & Facilitation: The Development Dimension is an ongoing research project on trade facilitation reform carried out by the Development Economics Research Group of the World Bank.

The project is focused on expanding knowledge about the relationships between trade costs and private sector growth and export competitiveness in developing countries. A major focus is on exploring the dynamic gains associated with lowering trade transactions costs and identifying the relative importance (net benefits) of related reform measures. The project has two primary parts: research and policy relevant analysis, and support for new data.

The project analyzes trade facilitation effects in a broad sense, as its analysis spans the entire realm of a typical international trade transaction; this includes, among other topics, the transparency and professionalism of customs and regulatory environments, the efficiency of supply chain-related infrastructure, the harmonization of product standards, and conformance to international or regional regulations.

== Leadership & Funding ==
The Project is led by Lead Economist John S. Wilson of the World Bank, and is funded through a Trust Fund at the World Bank established by the United Kingdom Department for International Development and a Multi-donor Trust Fund for Trade and Development.

== Research ==
Research associated with the project has included policy working papers, presentations, learning events, and research briefs.

=== World Bank Policy Research Working Papers ===
- “Transparency, Trade Costs, and Regional Integration in the Asia Pacific,” John S. Wilson, Ben Shepherd, Matthais Helble; World Bank Policy Research Working Paper 4401. The World Bank. 2007.
- “Help or Hindrance? The Impact of Harmonized Standards on African Exports,” John S. Wilson, Ben Shepherd, Withhold Czubala; World Bank Policy Research Working Paper 4400. The World Bank. 2007.
- “Product Standards, Harmonization, and Trade: Evidence from the Extensive Margin,” Ben Shepherd; World Bank Policy Research Working Paper 4390. The World Bank. 2007.
- “Trade Costs, Barriers to Entry, and Export Diversification in Developing Countries,” Ben Shepherd, Allen Dennis; World Bank Policy Research Working Paper 4368. The World Bank. 2007.
- Landlockedness, Infrastructure and Trade: New Estimates for Central Asian Countries,” Christopher Grigoriou; World Bank Policy Research Working Paper 4335. The World Bank. 2007.
- “Implementing a WTO Agreement on Trade Facilitation: What Makes Sense?” John S. Wilson, Michael J. Finger; World Bank Policy Research Working Paper 3971. The World Bank. 2006.
- “Moving Forward Faster: Trade Facilitation Reform and Mexican Competitiveness,” John S. Wilson, Isidro Soloaga, Alejandro Mejia; World Bank Policy Research Working Paper 3953. The World Bank. 2006.
- “The Data Chase: What's out there on Trade Costs and Nontariff Barriers?” John S. Wilson, Shweta Bagai; World Bank Policy Research Working Paper 3899. The World Bank. 2006.
- “Do Standards Matter for Export Success?” John S. Wilson, Maggie Xiaoyang Chen, Tsunehiro Otsuki; World Bank Policy Research Working Paper 3809. The World Bank. 2006.
- “The Cost of Compliance with Product Standards for Firms in Developing Countries: An Econometric Study,” John S. Wilson, Tsunehiro Otsuki, Keith E. Maskus; World Bank Policy Research Working Paper 3590. The World Bank. 2005.
- “Quantifying the impact of technical barriers to trade: A Framework for Analysis,” John S. Wilson, Tsunehiro Otsuki, Keith E. Maskus; World Bank Policy Research Working Paper 2512. The World Bank. 2000.

=== Trade Facilitation Issue Briefs ===
- “Transparency Reform Could Raise Trade by $148 Billion in APEC,” John S. Wilson, Benjamin Taylor; Trade Facilitation Research Brief, The World Bank. 2008.
- “Deeper Integration in ASEAN: Why Transport and Technology Matter for Trade,” John S. Wilson, Benjamin Taylor; Trade Facilitation Research Brief, The World Bank. 2008.
- “Trade Facilitation and the Doha Agenda: What Matters for Development,” John S. Wilson, Benjamin Taylor; Trade Facilitation Research Brief, The World Bank. 2008.
- “Trade Facilitation Reform Promises Large Gains to Trade in Mexico,” John S. Wilson, Benjamin Taylor; Trade Facilitation Research Brief, The World Bank. 2008.
- “Harmonized International Standards Do Matter to Developing Country Exports,” John S. Wilson, Benjamin Taylor; Trade Facilitation Research Brief, The World Bank. 2008.

== See also ==
- Trade facilitation
- Trade Facilitation and Development
- Non-tariff barriers to trade
- John S. Wilson (economist)
