= John S. Wilson (economist) =

American economist

Academic background
- Education: Columbia University

Academic work
- Discipline: International economics
- Website: Information at IDEAS / RePEc

John Sullivan Wilson is a former Lead Economist (retired) of the World Bank. He directed and managed research on transparency, trade facilitation, regulation, and economic development. Mr. Wilson served in the Development Research Group of the World Bank and also in operations in the Infrastructure Vice Presidency.

== Background ==
Wilson was born in Lakewood, Ohio and graduated from The College of Wooster in 1978 where he was a seven time All American (NCAA Division III) in swimming. He graduated from Columbia University's School of International and Public Affairs in New York in 1984 with a master's degree in International Affairs (MIA).

== Career ==
John S. Wilson joined the World Bank Group in 1999 and directed empirical and policy research on trade facilitation, aid effectiveness, and regulatory reform issues, as they relate to economic development. Wilson also provides expertise in bank operations and spent two years in the Bank's Infrastructure Vice Presidency. He participated in bank projects under preparation and completed totaling over $1.3 billion. Wilson also provided leadership for the bank in the establishment of the inter-agency Standards and Trade Development Facility. He also developed the initial concept for the bank's Trade Facilitation Facility in 2009 and is a member of the facility's program committee. Wilson is currently working with the Trade Department in the establishment of a new public-private partnership on “Aid for Trade Facilitation” for the Bank. Details can be found at https://web.archive.org/web/20081006185119/http://econ.worldbank.org/projects/trade_costs

Prior to joining the World Bank, Wilson was vice president for technology policy at the Information Technology Industry Council in Washington, D.C., from 1995 to 1999. At ITI Wilson was a corporate officer and member of the senior management team. He had management responsibility and budget responsibility for regulatory affairs standards, and technical trade barriers. During this period he was on the U.S. Steering Committee for the Transatlantic Business Dialogue and involved in preparations for extension of the Information Technology Agreement of the WTO to non-tariff barriers to trade related to standards and regulation.

Wilson has also been a visiting fellow at the Institute for International Economics. He served as a senior staff officer at the U.S. National Academies of Sciences and Engineering and National Research Council. While at the academies, he provided leadership in establishing the Board on Science, Technology, and Economic Policy and directed Management responsibilities include finance and supervision of professional staff. Duties included congressional, executive branch, private sector, and liaison with foreign governments. Directed several major policy studies, including; policy dialogues for the White House National Economic Council (NEC) on the economics of U.S. technology policy, the 1995 report Standards, Conformity Assessment, and Trade: Into the 21st Century at the request of the U.S. Congress, and the "Technology and Industrial Modernization of the Mexican Economy" project.

From 1989 to 1992, designed and directed the academies’ research project on civilian technology. Responsible for economic analysis and writing of final report, as well as financial, and staff management. The project, requested by the U.S. Congress in the Omnibus Trade and Competitiveness Act of 1988, resulted in the book: The Government Role in Civilian Technology: Building a New Alliance, published by the National Academy Press in 1992. The report provided detailed analysis and policy recommendations related to the economic returns to government investment in civilian R&D, industrial technology development and transfer.

Wilson was an adjunct professor of international affairs at Georgetown University, School of Foreign Service during 1993–94. He developed and taught a course on "International Technology and Corporate Strategy," Karl F. Landegger Program on International Business Diplomacy, Graduate School and also co-taught a course on “Technology Policy and Economic Competitiveness.”

== Selected publications ==
=== Chapters in Books ===
- “Cutting Trade Costs and Improved Business Facilitation in South Asia,” with Tsunehiro Otsuki, in South Asia Growth and Regional Integration, Sadiq Ahmed and Ejaz Ghani. New Delhi: Macmillan India Ltd. 2007
- "Trade Facilitation Reform and International Trade. The Case of Mexico." With A. Mejia and Isidro Soloaga, in A. Ortega Venzor, J.L. Paz Vega and R. Nuñez Gonzalez, eds., Políticas Públicas para el Crecimiento y Desarrollo. Mexico City: Editorial Porrua SA de CV. 2007.
- "Introduction: A Review of Key Issues" with Spencer Henson, in Spencer Henson and John S. Wilson, eds, The WTO and Technical Barriers to Trade. Cheltenham: Edward Elgar Publishing Limited 2005.
- "Trade Facilitation and Standards in Sub-Saharan Africa: An Overview.,” with Victor O. Abiola, in John S. Wilson and Victor Abiola, eds, Standards and Trade: A Voice for Africa. Washington, D.C.: World Bank, 2003.
- "Balancing Risk Reduction and Benefits from Trade in Setting Standards" with Tsunehiro Otsuki, in Laurian Unnevehr, eds., Overcoming Water Scarcity and Quality Constraints. Washington, D.C.: International Food Policy Research Institute, 2003.
- "Standards, Regulation and Trade: WTO Rules and Developing Country Concerns." In Bernard Hoekman, Philip English, Aaditiya Mattoo, eds., Development, Trade and the WTO: A Handbook. Washington, D.C.: World Bank, 2002.
- “An Empirical Framework for Analyzing Technical Regulations and Trade" with Keith Maskus and Tsunehiro Otsuki, in, Quantifying the Impact of Technical Barriers to Trade: Can It Be Done? Keith Maskus and John S. Wilson (eds.): University of Michigan Press. 2001.
- "A Review of Past Attempts and the New Policy Context,” with Keith Maskus in Quantifying the Impact of Technical Barriers to Trade: Can It Be Done?. Keith Maskus and John S. Wilson (eds.): University of Michigan Press. 2001.
- "Measuring the Effect of Food Safety Standards on African Exports to Europe." with Tsunehiro Otsuki and Mirvat Sewadeh. In, eds., The Economics of Quarantine and the SPS Agreement, Kym Anderson, Cheryl McRae and David Wilson (eds.). : Centre for International Economic Studies, Adelaide and AFFA Biosecurity Australia, Canberra.. 2000.
- “Regulatory Reform, Trade, and Telecommunications Goods and Services,” in Regulatory Reform in the Global Economy: Asian and Latin American Perspectives (Paris: Organization for Economic Cooperation and Development), June 1998
- "Technical Regulations and Trade: New Developments and the Asia Pacific Economic Cooperation Forum”, in John R. McIntyre ed., Japan's Technical Standards: Implications for Global Trade and Competitiveness (Greenwood Publishing), 1997
- “Telecommunications Liberalization: The Goods and Services Connection” in Gary Clyde Hufbauer and Erika Wada ed., Unfinished Business: Telecommunications after the Uruguay Round (Institute for International Economics), 1997.
- “Standards, Conformity Assessment, and Trade: New Developments and the Asia Pacific Economic Cooperation Forum,” in R. Hooley, M. Dutta, A. Nasution, and M. Pangestu ed., Asia Pacific Economic Cooperation: Theory and Policy (Greenwich CT: JAI Press Inc.), 1996
- “Eliminating Barriers to Trade in Telecommunications and Information Technology Goods and Services: Next Steps in Multilateral and Regional Liberalization Efforts,” in Regulatory Reform and International Market Openness (Paris: Organization for Economic Cooperation and Development), November 1996.
- “Technology and Industrial Modernization in Mexico," in Aspectos Tecnologicos de la Modernizacion Industrial de Mexico (Fundo de Cultura Economica), March 1995.
- “New Developments in International Standards and Global Trade: A Conference Summary,” with John M. Godfrey and Holly Grell-Lawe, in Board on Science, Technology, and Economic Policy ed., Standards, Conformity Assessment, and Trade: Into the 21st Century (Washington D.C.: National Academy Press), 1995.

=== Edited volumes ===
- Trade Facilitation and Economic Development, Editor with Jean-Christophe Maur, Edward Elgar (forthcoming).
- The WTO and Technical Barriers to Trade. Editor with Spencer Henson, Edward Elgar, 2005.
- Standards and Global Trade: A Voice for Africa. Editor with Victor O. Abiola, Washington, D.C.: World Bank, 2003.
- Quantifying the Impact of Technical Barriers to Trade: Can It Be Done, Editor with Keith Maskus, Studies in International Economics Series, Ann Arbor: University of Michigan Press 2001.

=== Journal articles ===
- “Beyond the Information Technology Agreement: Harmonization of Standards and Trade in Electronic Products” (2010) with Daniel Reyes and John S. Wilson, The World Economy (forthcoming).
- “EU Accession and Trade Facilitation: Setting Priorities Post-Crisis,” (2010) Harry Broadman, Xubei Luo, and John S. Wilson, Journal of International Commerce, Economics, and Policy (forthcoming).
- “Trade Facilitation in ASEAN Member Countries: Measuring Progress and Assessing Priorities,” Ben Shepherd and John S. Wilson, Journal of Asian Economics, Vol. 20 Issue 4, September 2009.
- “Why trade facilitation matters to Africa,” Alberto Portugal-Perez and John S. Wilson, World Trade Review, Volume 8, Issue 3, July 2009, pp. 379–416.
- “Help or Hindrance: The Impact of Harmonized Standards on African Exports,” Witold Czbala, Ben Shepherd, and John S. Wilson, Journal of African Economies, March 2009.
- “Transparency, Trade Costs, and Regional Integration in the Asia-Pacific” with Matthias Helble and Ben Shepherd, The World Economy, Volume 32, Issue 3, March 2009, pp. 479–508.
- “Trade, Transparency, and Welfare in the Asia Pacific,” with Kazutomo Abe, Journal of International Economic Studies, Vol. 12 No. 2, December 2008, pages 35–78.
- “Standards and Export Decisions: Firm-level Evidence from Developing Countries,” with Maggie Chen and Tsunehiro Otsuki, Journal of International Trade and Economic Development, Vol. 17 Issue 4, pp. 501–523, January 2008.
- "Road Infrastructure in Europe and Central Asia: Does Network Quality Affect Trade?” With Benjamin A.Shepherd, Journal of Economic Integration, Vol. 22, No. 4, December 2007, pp. 723–747.
- “Standards and Developing Country Exports: A Review of Selected Studies and Suggestions for Future Research, Journal of Agricultural Trade and International Development, Volume 4, No. 1, 2007, pp. 35–45..
- "Implementing a Trade Facilitation Agreement in the WTO: What Makes Sense?”. With J. Michael Finger., Pacific Economic Review 12(3): 5–355, 2007.
- "Assessing the Benefits of Trade Facilitation: A Global Perspective,” with Tsunehiro Otsuki and Catherine L. Mann, World Economy 28(6): 841–871, 2005.
- “To Spray or Not to Spray: Pesticides, Banana Exports, and Food Safety."with Tsunehiro Otsuki. Food Policy 29(2): 131–146, 2004.
- “Balancing Food Safety and Risk: Do Drug Residue Limits Affect Trade in Beef?” with Bashali Majumdsar and Tsunehiro Otsuki, Journal of International Trade and Economic Development, Volume 12 (4) pp. 377–402, 2003.
- “Trade Facilitation and Economic Development: A New Approach to Measuring the Impact.” Wilson, John S., Catherine Mann, and Tsunehiro Otsuki, World Bank Economic Review 17(3): 367–389, 2003.
- "Food Safety and Trade: Winners and Losers in a Non-Harmonized World." With Tsunehiro Otsuki, Journal of Economic Integration 18(2): 266–287, 2003.
- "Trade and Standards: A Look at Central America" with Gary Clyde Hufbauer and Barbara Kotschwar, The World Economy, Vol. 25, pp. 991–1018, 2002.
- "Saving Two in a Billion: Quantifying the Trade Effect of European Food Safety Standards on African Exports." With Tsunehiro Otsuki and Mirvat Sewadeh, Food Policy, #26, 2001.
- "What Price Precaution? European Harmonization of Aflatoxin Regulations and African Food Exports.” With Tsunehior Otsuki, and Mirvat Sewadeh, European Review of Agricultural Economics 28, 2001.
- "The New Trade Agenda: Technology, Standards, and Technical Barriers," SAIS Review, 16(1), 1996.

=== Other Publications, and Selected Working Papers and Dissemination of Research ===
- “Aid Effectiveness: Why Trade Facilitation is Important,” with Benjamin Taylor, Research Issue Brief, World Bank, June 2010.
- “The APEC Agenda Going Forward,” with Benjamin Taylor, Research Issue Brief, June 2010.
- “Highly Targeted, Policy Oriented Aid for Trade is Most Effective in Stimulating Trade Flows,” with Benjamin Taylor, Research Issue Brief, World Bank, May 2009.
- “Export Performance and Trade Facilitation Reform: Hard and Soft Infrastructure” with Alberto Portugal-Perez, World Bank Policy Research Working Paper No 5261, April 2010.
- “The Crisis and Beyond: Why Trade Facilitation Matters,” with Benjamin Taylor, Research Issue Brief, World Bank, April 2009.
- “Time as a Determinant of Comparative Advantage,” with Yue Li, World Bank Policy Research Working Paper No 5128, November 2009.
- “The Distance Effect and the Regionalization of the Trade of Low Income Countries, with Celine Carrere and Jaime de Melo, Center for Economic Policy Research Discussion Paper # 7458, September 2009.
- “Aid for Trade Facilitation,” with Matthias Helble and Catherine Mann, World Bank Working Paper # 5064, September 2009.
- “Beyond the Information Technology Agreement: Harmonization of Standards and Trade in Electronics,” with Alberto Portugal-Perez, World Bank Working Paper # 4916, April 2009.
- “Weathering the Storm: Investing in Port Infrastructure to Lower Trade Costs in East Asia,” with Kazutumo Abe, World Bank Working Paper #4911, April 2009.
- "Trade Facilitation and Development,” in Princeton Encyclopedia of the World Economy. Kenneth A. Reinert and Ramkishen S. Rajan, eds, Princeton: Princeton University Press, 2008.
- "Technical Barriers to Trade,” in Princeton Encyclopedia of the World Economy. Kenneth A. Reinert and Ramkishen S. Rajan, eds, Princeton: Princeton University Press, 2008.
- “Expanding Trade within Africa: The Impact of Trade Facilitation,” with Dominique Njinkeu and Bruno Powo Fosso, World Bank Working Paper #4790, December 2008.
- “Governance, Corruption, and Trade in the Asia Pacific”, with Kazutomo Abe, World Bank Working Paper #4731, 2008.
- “Trade Costs in Africa: Barriers and Opportunities for Reform,” with Alberto Portugal-Perez, World Bank Working Paper #4719, September 2008.
- “Trade Facilitation in ASEAN Member Countries: Measuring Progress and Assessing Priorities,” with Ben Shepherd, World Bank Working Paper #4615, May 2008.
- "Transparency and Trade Facilitation in the Asia Pacific: Estimating the Gains from Reform". Barton, A.C.T.: The Department of Foreign Affairs and Trade, with Benjamin A., Shepherd and Matthias Helble. 2007.
- “Trade Facilitation: Challenges and Opportunities in Eastern Europe and the Former Soviet Union,” in From Disintegration to Reintegration: Europe and the Former Soviet Union in International Trade, World Bank 2006.
- “Trade Facilitation Reform and Competitiveness,” Competitiveness,” with Isidro Soloaga and A Mejia, in Mexico Competitiveness: Reaching its Potential, World Bank, March 2006.
- "Trade Facilitation: Why it Matters to APEC and What Next”, APEC Economies Newsletter, Australian National University, September 2006.
- "Trade Facilitation and Economic Development." World Trade Brief 46–48, 2005.
- “Trade and Transport Facilitation: European Accession and Capacity Building Priorities,” with Xubei Luo and Harry G. Broadman, European Conference of Ministers of Transport and OECD Research Center, 2005.
- “Standards and Agricultural Trade: A Primer and Background Readings,” with Spencer J. Henson, 2003 (mimeo).
- “Balancing Risk Reduction and Benefits from Trade in Setting Standards,”with Tsunehiro Otsuki, 2020 Vision Briefs, 10 No. 6, IFPRI, 2003.
- “Reducing Transport Costs in an Era of Security”, with Shweta Bagai, Carsten Fink, in Global Economic Prospects 2004: Realizing the Development Promise of the Doha Agenda- Chapter Five (The World Bank), 2003.
- “Trade Facilitation: A Development Perspective in the Asia-Pacific Region Asia Pacific Economic Cooperation,” with Catherine Mann, Yuen Pau Woo, Nizar Assanie and Inbom Choi, Asia Pacific Economic Cooperation, 2002.
- “Bridging the Standards Divide: Recommendations for Reform from a Development Perspective,” background paper, The World Development Report 2002: Building Institutions for Markets, The World Bank, September 2001.
- "Agriculture in the WTO: The Role of Product Attributes in the Agricultural Negotiations”, Wilson, John S., Donna Roberts, Laurian Unnevehr, Julie Caswell, Ian Sheldon, Tsunehiro Otsuki, and David Orden,. International Cultural Trade Research Consortium, Commission Paper #17, 2001.
- "The Development Challenge in Trade: Sanitary and Phytosanitary Standards”, Paper for the WTO Sanitary and Phytosanitary Standards Committee, June 2000
- "Cutting through Red Tape: New Directions for APEC's Trade Facilitation Agenda", with Yuen Pau Woo, Asia Pacific Foundation of Canada, Vancouver: APEC, 2000.
- “Regulatory Reform, Trade, and Telecommunications Goods and Services,” in Regulatory Reform in the Global Economy: Asian and Latin American Perspectives (Paris: Organization for Economic Cooperation and Development), June 1998

=== Selected Research Work in Process ===
- “Aid for Trade: Building on Progress to Date,” with Bernard Hoekman.
- “Pre-Shipment Inspection Programs and Trade,” with Olivier Cadot and Irina Velea.
- “Trade Costs and North-South Foreign Direct Investment,” with Alberto Portugal-Perez.
- “The WTO Trade Facilitation Agreement: Setting Benchmarks for Reform” with Benjamin Taylor, in The Doha Development Agenda, Aaditya Mattoo and William Martin eds. (in process).
