= KenTrade =

Kenya Trade Network Agency
- KenTrade

Agency overview
- Formed: 2011
- Jurisdiction: Kenya
- Headquarters: Embankment Plaza, Nairobi, Kenya.
- Motto: "Trade Made Simple"
- Agency executives: Basil Criticos, Chairperson of the Board of Directors; David Ngarama, Chief Executive Officer
- Parent department: Ministry of the National Treasury & Economic Planning
- Website: https://www.kentrade.go.ke/

The Kenya Trade Network Agency (KenTrade) is a state agency established by the National Government of Kenya designated with easing cross-border trade through the establishment, management, and implementation of the first National Electronic Single Window System in the Republic of Kenya.

== History ==
Before the organisation was established, trade facilitation in Kenya was a complex procedure that resulted in difficulties in commercial transactions brought on by, among other things, a convoluted bureaucracy. The intention of the organisation's establishment was the removal of obstacles of this nature in order to improve the administration and logistics of commerce on both the domestic and international levels. The agency was subsequently established through a Legal Notice issued by the government of Kenya in January 2011.

The agency has worked towards achieving its mandate through the establishment of Kenya's first National Electronic Single Window System (also known as "Kenya TradeNet System"), which serves as a single point of entry allowing parties participating in international trade and transport logistics to electronically file documents for processing and approvals and to make payments electronically for fees, levies, tariffs, and taxes payable to the government, on products imported or exported in the country.

By eliminating the time-consuming and expensive process of visiting numerous government agencies to begin trade transactions and unifying majority of the necessary processes into one system, the single link has improved the speed and ease with which trade can be carried out in the country. This has led to a simplification of the process of trade transactions, which has resulted in an increase in the ease and speed with which trade can be carried out in the country.

The National Electronic Single Window System Act was passed in July 2022 to give the agency a firmer foundation in law on which to operate and achieve its mandate.

== Location ==
The headquarters of KenTrade is located in the capital city of Nairobi, at Embankment Plaza in the Upper Hill area of Nairobi.

== See also ==
- Ministry of Industrialization, Trade and Enterprise Development
