= Pan-Asia =

Pan-Asia may refer to:

- East Asia
- Asia-Pacific

== See also ==
- ASEAN Plus Three
- Pan-Asianism
