= Enhanced Integrated Framework =

International program

Enhanced Integrated Framework for Trade-Related Assistance for the Least Developed Countries
- Abbreviation: EIF
- Predecessor: Integrated Framework for Trade-Related Assistance for the Least Developed Countries
- Formation: January 1, 2007
- Type: International trade organization
- Headquarters: Geneva, Switzerland
- Official language: English, French, Portuguese
- Executive Director: Ratnakar Adhikari
- Affiliations: World Trade Organization (WTO), International Monetary Fund (IMF), World Bank, United Nations Development Program (UNDP), United Nations Conference on Trade and Development (UNCTAD), United Nations Industrial Development Organization (UNIDO)
- Website: www.enhancedif.org

The Enhanced Integrated Framework for Trade-Related Assistance for the Least Developed Countries (commonly abbreviated as EIF) is a global development program with the objective of supporting least developed countries (LDCs) to better integrate into the global trading system and to make trade a driver for development. The multi-donor program was launched on 1 January 2007 as the successor of the Integrated Framework for Trade-Related Technical Assistance to the Least-Developed Countries (commonly abbreviated as IF), which existed from October 1997 to December 2006. The second phase of the EIF has started on 1 January 2016 and will last for 7 years.

The EIF represents a partnership between different stakeholders in international development assistance including several UN agencies, regional inter-governmental organizations and other donors. The program is supported by a multi-donor trust fund with paid-up capital of USD $165 million (as of 30 April 2012) for development interventions in 49 Least Developed Countries (LDCs).

The EIF is being promoted by the World Trade Organization (WTO) and Organisation for Economic Co-operation and Development (OECD) as the preferred way to provide official development assistance to LDC's as part of the global Aid for Trade Initiative.

== History ==
The idea of the predecessor program, the IF, was first discussed at the First Ministerial Conference of the WTO in Singapore in December 1996. It was subsequently launched in October 1997 at the WTO's High Level Meeting on Integrated Initiatives for Least-Developed Countries' Trade Development, which was held at the WTO. It was meant as a mechanism to increase effectiveness and efficiency of trade-related technical assistance to LDCs by improving coordination between donors, beneficiary countries and providers of technical assistance. The calls for an overarching program arose from the feeling that the uncoordinated actions of these parties lead to duplication of efforts, overallocation of resources to certain technical and geographical areas, and an untapped potential for joint initiatives and information exchange.

By some, the IF is regarded as a failed program because the responsiveness of the involved parties (LDCs, development agencies, and donors) was much smaller than had been expected. Susan Prowse from the UK's Overseas Development Institute, for example, points out that LDCs and donors had different perceptions and expectations about the purpose of the IF: While LDCs expected it to be mainly a vehicle to mobilize more financial resources for development interventions, donors sought to create a mechanism to improve co-ordination. Prowse, as others, also mentions that the main flaw of the IF lay in its design, meaning, that the assistance that was channeled through the IF was not aligned to a country's overall development strategy.

As a consequence of the limited impact that the IF had achieved during the initial program period, the Development Committee of the International Monetary Fund and the World Bank agreed at its meeting in 2005 to restructure the program and endow it with additional resources. A Task Force for the Enhanced Integrated Framework was subsequently created by the Steering Committee of the IF, which, on 29 June 2006 published its recommendations for changing the existing strategy and implementation modalities. The revamped programme, then officially called Enhanced Integrated Framework, was launched on 1 January 2007 and began to be fully operational in 2010.

Other similar programs include the World Bank's Trade Facilitation Facility and the WTO's Standards and Trade Development Facility.

== Events ==
=== The Global Forum on Inclusive Trade for Least Developed Countries ===
In 2018, the EIF Secretariat hosted the inaugural Global Forum on Inclusive Trade for Least Developed Countries.

== Trade for Development News ==
The EIF has an in-house news platform called Trade for Development News, which shares stories on topics ranging from ecommerce to trade facilitation from the EIF and partner agencies, as well as the broader Trade for Development and Aid for Trade spheres.

== Governance structure ==
Several bodies on the global and the national levels form the institutional framework of EIF program.

=== Global governance bodies ===
The EIF Steering Committee is the highest level body of the EIF and responsible for setting the overall policy direction of the programme, reviewing its effectiveness and ensuring transparency. It is composed of representatives from each of the participating LDCs, the donor countries and agencies, the six core agencies, the EIF Executive Secretariat and the EIF Trust Fund Manager ex officio. The Steering Committee meets at least twice a year.

The EIF Board is responsible for managing the programme and taking key operational decisions. It thereby implements the EIF Steering Committee's policies, which it reports to. It is made up of three LDC representatives, three donor representatives and one representative each from the core agencies, the EIF Executive Secretariat and the EIF Trust Fund Manager. The EIF Board decides over funding decisions under the EIF Trust Fund and monitors, reviews and evaluates country-specific progress and operations.

The EIF Executive Secretariat carries out the day-to-day operations of the programme in collaboration with the EIF Trust Fund Manager and the National EIF Focal Points. It was established on 1 October 2008 with Dorothy Tembo as its executive director. The EIF Executive Secretariat is based at WTO headquarters and reports to the EIF Board as well as to the Director-General of the WTO.

The EIF Trust Fund Manager manages the financial contributions made by donors to the EIF Trust Fund. The United Nations Office for Project Services (UNOPS) has been designated for this role and the UNOPS in Switzerland is acting as the executing office.

=== Country-level governance bodies ===
The below governance bodies, which are either being established or already operational within the participating LDCs, are as a whole called National Implementation Arrangement (NIA).

Each LDC has a National EIF Focal Point who coordinates the EIF process in the country. He or she is appointed by and based in the LDC. Usually, only senior government officials get appointed. The EIF Focal Point is in direct contact with the EIF Executive Secretariat and is supported by a National Implementation Unit.

The National Implementation Unit supports the National EIF Focal Point in coordinating and monitoring the implementation of projects funded under the EIF.

The EIF Donor Facilitator is responsible for facilitating, jointly with the EIF National Focal Point, donor coordination and the dialogue between donors and the LDC's government on trade issues and development interventions. He or she plays an important role in ensuring that interventions are aligned to a country's overall development priorities, according to one of the five principles of the 2005 Paris Declaration on Aid Effectiveness. The EIF Donor Facilitator is a representative from the donor community and is identified by the government and other donors.

The EIF National Steering Committee represents a national dialogue forum among different public and private stakeholders in trade and development. It is composed of government officials, private sector associations, civil society representatives and the donor community and takes high-level decisions on the national EIF process.

== Functioning ==
The EIF is designed in such a way that its overall objective of making trade a driver for LDCs' development is pursued through three areas of activities:

- Mainstreaming trade into national development strategies
- Setting up new structures or strengthen existing institutions needed to coordinate the delivery of trade-related technical assistance
- Building capacity to trade, which also includes addressing critical supply‑side constraints.

The EIF programme works with six core partner agencies, which are responsible for jointly delivering development assistance in these three areas (see below).

An LDC is, in principle, in of the following three stages: Pre-DTIS phase, DTIS phase, implementation phase.

=== Pre-DTIS stage ===
In this stage, a country requests membership in the programme. This step has become superfluous since all current LDCs are EIF member countries. Once the request has been reviewed and approved by the EIF Board, the LDC sets up a national EIF structure as outlined above. An important element of this step is to build up in-country support for the trade and development agenda through stakeholder outreach, advocacy and awareness-raising. LDCs in this stage can benefit from so-called pre-DTIS funds of up to US$50,000 to build the in-country institutional infrastructure needed for the next stages.

=== DTIS and Action Matrix stage ===
Once the institutional set-up is operational, an LDC can engage, in collaboration with one or more of the six core partner agencies, to conduct a Diagnostic Trade Integration Study (DTIS). The DTIS is a comprehensive analysis of an LDC's economic and trade environment and aims at identifying constraints to competitiveness, supply chain weaknesses and sectors of greatest growth and/or export potential. Each DTIS contains an Action Matrix which outlines priority reforms to be conducted in a certain order to alleviate most binding constraints to greater trade competitiveness. A beneficiary country may request funds of up to USD400,000 to finance the production of a DTIS, or up to USD200,000 for the update of an existing DTIS.

=== Implementation stage ===
==== Strengthening of in-country EIF institutions ====
During the implementation stage, an LDC undertakes concrete steps towards integrating trade into its national development strategy and identifying funding for key priorities. The NIA plays a crucial supporting role for it provides a forum for dialogue and exchange between the LDC's policymakers, the private sector, and development partners that provide advisory services. The LDC can utilize co-called Tier 1 funding and/or seek bilateral donor support to strengthen its NIA through capacity building projects of up to five years.

==== Building supply side capacities ====
The LDC also implements the priority projects of the Action Matrix during this stage by elaborating individual development interventions for each of the reforms mentioned in the Matrix. The EIF Trust Fund provides so-called Tier 2 funds for priority small-scale projects to build up trade related and supply-side capacities. However, the bulk of the funding should be sought from bilateral donor support.

== Involved organizations and countries ==
Six core agencies are responsible for providing trade-related technical assistance to the participating LDCs and help them attaining the EIF's overall objective: IMF, World Bank, International Trade Centre, United Nations Development Program, United Nations Conference on Trade and Development, WTO. United Nations Industrial Development Organization is currently an observer agency.

Twenty-three donors are providing the financial resources for the EIF Trust Fund and have representatives in the global governance bodies: Belgium, Hungary, Saudi Arabia, Canada, Iceland, Spain, Denmark, Ireland, Sweden, European Commission, Japan, Switzerland, Estonia, Luxembourg, Turkey, Finland, Netherlands, United States, France, Norway, United Kingdom, Germany, Republic of Korea.

Other EIF partners include:

- African Development Bank – AfDB (envisaged partnership for LDCs in Africa)
- Asian Development Bank – ADB (envisaged partnership for LDCs in Asia)
- Global Mechanism (cooperation on sustainable agriculture and trade in LDCs)
- Inter-American Development Bank – IDB (envisaged partnership for Haiti)
- Standards and Trade Development Facility – STDF (close collaboration on SPS issues in LDCs)
- United Nations Industrial Development Organization – UNIDO (observer and implementing agency)
- United Nations Office for Project Services – UNOPS (Trust Fund Manager)
