= Paris School of International Affairs =

International relations school of Sciences Po

- École des affaires internationales
- Former names: Section internationale (1872–2010)
- Type: Graduate School
- Established: 2010; 16 years ago
- Founder: Ghassan Salamé
- Parent institution: Sciences Po
- Academic affiliations: APSIA
- Dean: Arancha González Laya
- Students: 1,700
- Location: Paris, France
- Campus: Urban
- Language: English
- Website: www.sciencespo.fr/psia/

The Paris School of International Affairs (PSIA) is a graduate school of Sciences Po (also referred to as the Institut d'études politiques de Paris) based in Paris, France, and is one of the most prestigious graduate schools for international relations. Located in the Saint-Germain-des-Prés neighborhood in the 7th arrondissement of Paris, the school has an international student population of 70%, with 1700 students coming from over 110 countries.

Taught primarily in English and optionally in French, PSIA offers eight two-year Master's degrees in international affairs, along with several double degrees with international partner universities, including Columbia University, Georgetown University and the London School of Economics and Political Science (LSE).

As Sciences Po's graduate school for international affairs, PSIA was in 2024 jointly ranked second best programme globally for politics, along with the University of Oxford.

PSIA's current dean is Arancha Gonzalez, former Minister of Foreign Affairs of Spain, succeeding Enrico Letta, former Prime Minister of Italy, who held the position from 2015 to 2021.

== History ==
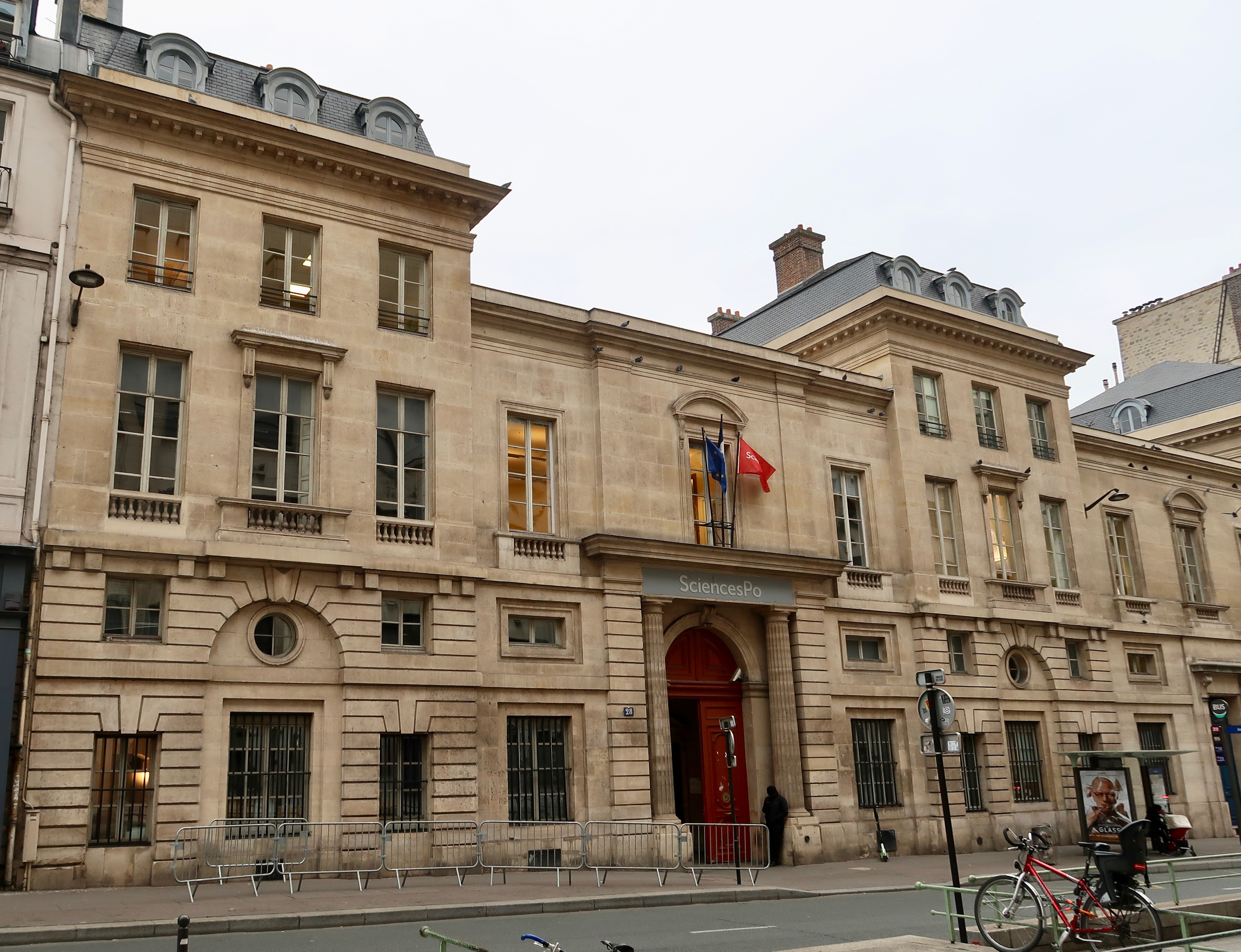
Facade of PSIA

The Paris School of International Affairs was established in 2010 in the context of the previous Sciences Po Director Richard Descoings' reforms to expand and internationalize Sciences Po and to diversify its student body. These reforms were effectively seen by the international media as a bold move away from the traditional grandes écoles French system. As many Masters programs have been transformed into entire schools within Sciences Po, PSIA replaced Sciences Po's former master d'Affaires internationales. PSIA's original precursor is the section internationale (international section) created as early as 1872 by the Ecole libre des sciences politiques (Free school of political sciences) and which welcomed more than 30% of foreign students.

In January 2010 Ghassan Salamé was appointed the first dean of PSIA. In September of the same year, the school had a first intake of 500 graduate students. Within one year, international applications doubled and PSIA now has an enrollment of 1300 students from over 100 countries.

On 20 April 2015 it was announced that Enrico Letta, former Prime Minister of Italy, would succeed Ghassan Salamé as Dean starting in September 2015.

On 18 February 2022 it was announced that Arancha Gonzalez, former Minister of Foreign Affairs of Spain, would become Dean of PSIA starting 1 March 2022. She is the first woman to hold this position.

== Partner Universities ==
Dual degrees are offered between PSIA and several national and international partner universities:

- Columbia University
- Freie Universität Berlin
- Georgetown University
- IE Business School
- King's College London
- London School of Economics and Political Science (LSE)
- Luigi Bocconi University
- Peking University
- Stockholm School of Economics
- University of Cape Town
- University of St. Gallen

== Governance ==
PSIA is governed by two bodies. While a 'Strategy Committee' decides the school's strategic orientation, a scientific committee, composed of PSIA faculty, is in charge of curriculum affairs.

As of 2024, members of PSIA's governing bodies include:

- Børge Brende, President of the World Economic Forum and former foreign minister of Norway
- Stephen Dunbar-Johnson, President of The New York Times International
- Reem Ebrahim Al-Hashimi, Minister of State for International Cooperation of the United Arab Emirates
- Franziska Brandtner, Parliamentary State Secretary, Federal Ministry for Economic Affairs and Climate Action (Germany)
- Filippo Grandi, United Nations High Commissioner for Refugees (UNHCR)
- Sylvie Kaufmann, Editorial Director, Le Monde
- Kang Kyung-Wha, former foreign minister of South Korea
- Louise Mushikiwabo, Secretary-General of the Organisation Internationale de la Francophonie
- Rebeca Grynspan, Secretary-General of UNCTAD
- Bruno Stagno-Ugarte, Deputy Executive Director at Human Rights Watch

== Noteworthy faculty and visiting professors ==
Among PSIA's scholars, practitioners, and leaders in international affairs, are:

- Rony Brauman, former President of Médecins Sans Frontières, Director of Research at the Doctors Without Borders Foundation
- Paul Collier, director of the International Growth Centre and the Centre for the Study of African Economies at the University of Oxford, former director of the Development Research Group of the World Bank
- Lakhdar Brahimi, former UN envoy and advisor
- Sir Howard Davies, British economist, former Director of the London School of Economics and Political Science.
- Olivier de Schutter, UN Special Rapporteur on the Right to Food
- Mamadou Diouf, Leitman Professor of African Studies at Columbia University, specialist in urban, political, social, and intellectual history of colonial and postcolonial Africa
- Fawaz Gerges, network news analyst, and also Professor of Middle Eastern Politics and International Relations
- Ian Goldin, Director of the Oxford Martin School and former Vice President at the World Bank
- Dmytro Kuleba, Former Minister of Foreign Affairs of Ukraine
- Bruno Latour, Sciences Po Professor of Sociology and Anthropology, 2013 Holberg Prize and Centennial Professor at the London School of Economics and Political Science
- Juli Minoves-Triquell, Andorran diplomat and author
- Miguel Angel Moratinos, Foreign Minister of Spain and previously the EU Special Representative for the Middle East Peace Process, as well as formerly the Ambassador of Spain to Israel
- Yasha Mounk, German-American political scientist and journalist
- David Rieff, policy analyst, senior fellow at the World Policy Institute at the New School for Social Research
- Ghassan Salamé, Dean of PSIA, former Senior Advisor to the United Nations Secretary-General (2003–2006) and Political Advisor to the UN Mission in Iraq (2003)
- Bruno Stagno-Ugarte, Former Minister of Foreign Affairs of Costa Rica, Chief Advocacy Officer at Human Rights Watch
- Hubert Védrine, Diplomatic adviser of François Mitterrand, and former Minister of Foreign Affairs
