= ASEAN Free Trade Area =

Free trade area of the Association of South East Asian Nations

Agreement on the Common Effective Preferential Tariff (CEPT) Scheme for the ASEAN Free Trade Area (AFTA)
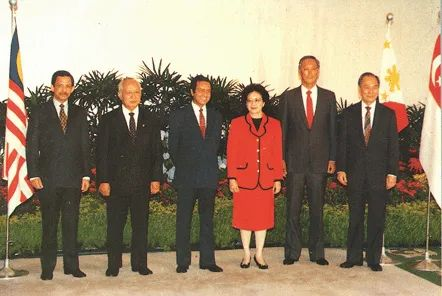
- ASEAN leaders at the signing of the AFTA (CEPT) Agreement in Singapore, 28 January 1992)
- Type: Free trade area and Economic Integration Agreement
- Context: ASEAN economic integration
- Signed: January 28, 1992
- Location: Singapore
- Effective: January 1, 1993
- Condition: Implementation of tariff-reduction schedules under the CEPT Scheme began on 1 January 1993.
- Amendment: Protocol to Amend the Agreement on the CEPT Scheme for AFTA (15 December 1995); Protocol to Amend the Agreement on the CEPT Scheme for AFTA for the Elimination of Import Duties (31 January 2003); Protocol to Provide Special Consideration for Rice and Sugar (23 August 2007)
- Replaces: ASEAN Preferential Trading Arrangements (PTA)
- Replaced by: ASEAN Trade in Goods Agreement (ATIGA)
- Parties: Brunei; Cambodia; Indonesia; Laos; Malaysia; Myanmar; Philippines; Singapore; Thailand; Timor-Leste; Vietnam
- Depositary: ASEAN Secretariat
- Language: English

The ASEAN Free Trade Area (AFTA) is a trade bloc agreement by the Association of Southeast Asian Nations supporting local trade and manufacturing in all ASEAN countries, and facilitating economic integration with regional and international allies. It stands as one of the largest and most important free trade areas (FTA) in the world, and together with its network of dialogue partners, drove some of the world's largest multilateral forums and blocs, including Asia-Pacific Economic Cooperation, East Asia Summit and Regional Comprehensive Economic Partnership.

The AFTA agreement was signed on 28 January 1992 in Singapore. When the AFTA agreement was originally signed, ASEAN had six members, namely, Brunei, Indonesia, Malaysia, Philippines, Singapore and Thailand. Vietnam joined in 1995, Laos and Myanmar in 1997 and Cambodia in 1999. AFTA now comprises the ten countries of ASEAN. All the four latecomers were required to sign the AFTA agreement to join ASEAN, but were given longer time frames in which to meet AFTA's tariff reduction obligations.

The primary goals of AFTA seek to:

- Increase ASEAN's competitive edge as a production base in the world market through the elimination, within ASEAN, of tariffs and non-tariff barriers; and
- attract more foreign direct investment to ASEAN.

The primary mechanism for achieving such goals is the Common Effective Preferential Tariff scheme, which established a phased schedule in 1992 with the goal to increase the region's competitive advantage as a production base geared for the world market.

== History ==
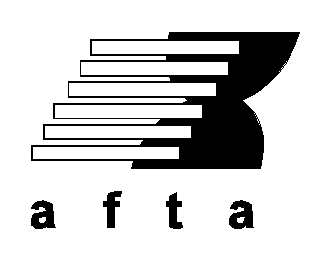
ASEAN Free Trade Area logo

1967

- The Association of Southeast Asian Nations (ASEAN) was established on 8 August 1967 when the foreign ministers of Indonesia, Malaysia, the Philippines, Singapore and Thailand signed the ASEAN Declaration.
- The ASEAN Declaration announced the establishment of an Association for Regional Cooperation among the Countries of Southeast Asia, aiming to promote cooperation in the economic, social, cultural, technical, education and other fields.
- It also aims to promote regional peace and stability through abiding respect for justice and the rule of law and adherence to the principles of the United Nations Charter.

1976

- The first ASEAN Summit (also known as Bali Summit) was held on 23–24 Feb 1976 in Bali, Indonesia.
- Economic cooperation among ASEAN members was emphasised as the justification for the Summit.
- The establishment of AFTA was strongly resisted by President Suharto from Indonesia.

1977

- The second ASEAN Summit was held in Kuala Lumpur, Malaysia.
- The major concern was to improve ASEAN's economic conditions at home by expanding the regionalisation with other industrialised nations.
- There were post summit conferences with Japan, Australia, New Zealand and the United States which overshadowed the ASEAN Summit.
- ASEAN emerged as a promising regional organisation deserving support.

1987

- The third ASEAN Summit was held on 14–15 December 1987 in Manila, the Philippines.
- In between the second and the third summit, economic cooperation was existent among ASEAN members, whereas economic integration was less favoured due to the risk of raising distributional issues and the reduced national political autonomy.
- Economic growth became the central domestic political requirement and economic cooperation turned into the central focus.
- The concept of free trade area was advocated and emphasised in the summit, where further development of the regional counter-trade mechanisms were suggested by several country sources.
- The ambitious "ASEAN Trade Area" was proposed by the ASEAN Economic Research Unit of the Institute of Southeast Asian Studies in Singapore.
- The concept of "ASEAN Trade Area" refers to a harmonising custom union with internal free trade and external tariffs bound to ASEAN goods among member countries (Indonesia, Malaysia, Thailand, the Philippines, Singapore, Brunei).

1991

- ASEAN started to liberalise trade by employing the CEPT concept, yet avoiding the word "free trade".
- Prime Minister Anand from Thailand and Prime Minister Goh Chok Tong from Singapore came up with the idea of AFTA in July 1991.
- The AFTA concept paper was subsequently developed by Prime Minister Anand and a team led by Suthee Singhasaneh from Thailand.

1992

- The fourth ASEAN Summit was held in Singapore.
- The AFTA agreement was signed on 28 January 1992 in Singapore.
- The 6 members who signed the agreement were Brunei, Indonesia, Malaysia, the Philippines, Singapore and Thailand.
- The agreement was designated to eliminate tariff barriers among the signatories and create a regional market of 500 million people.
- The CEPT scheme was introduced in the agreement to alleviate the tariff on a wide range of products traded within the region.

1993

- AFTA was officially implemented in 1993, where the time frame of application was shortened from 15 to 10 years.
- The integration of CEPT and AFTA was presented by Akrasanee, where the CEPT rates of 0%–5% were defined as free trade rates. Member countries were granted the timing to reduce their tariff rates to 0%–5% within 15 years. Late joiners would be granted a shorter timespan to reduce their tariff rates accordingly.

1995

- Vietnam officially joined ASEAN on 28 July 1995 and has agreed to join AFTA as well.
- Under Vietnam's agreement with ASEAN on AFTA, Vietnam will meet the requirements on tariff and non-tariff reductions over a ten-year period, beginning on 1 January 1996.

1997

- Laos and Myanmar joined the AFTA agreement on 23 July 1997.
- Both Myanmar and Laos has been given time to reduce tariffs on the local goods to below 5% until 2008.

1999

- Cambodia joined the AFTA agreement on 30 April 1999.
- Cambodia agreed to begin tariff reduction on 1 January 2000 and the deadline to achieve AFTA was 2010.

== The Common Effective Preferential Tariff (CEPT) scheme ==
Unlike the EU, AFTA does not apply a common external tariff on imported goods. Each ASEAN member may impose tariffs on goods entering from outside ASEAN based on its national schedules. However, for goods originating within ASEAN, ASEAN members are to apply a tariff rate of 0–5% (the more recent members of Cambodia, Laos, Myanmar and Vietnam, also known as CMLV countries, were given additional time to implement the reduced tariff rates). This is known as the Common Effective Preferential Tariff (CEPT) scheme.

ASEAN members have the option of excluding products from the CEPT in three cases: 1.) Temporary exclusions 2.) Sensitive agricultural products 3.) General exceptions. Temporary exclusions refer to products for which tariffs will ultimately be lowered to 0–5 %, but which are being protected temporarily by a delay in tariff reductions.

For sensitive agricultural products include commodities such as rice, ASEAN members have until 2010 to reduce the tariff levels to 0–5%.

General exceptions refer to products which an ASEAN member deems necessary for the protection of national security, public morals, the protection of human, animal or plant life and health, and protection of articles of artistic, historic, or archaeological value. ASEAN members have agreed to enact zero tariff rates on virtually all imports by 2010 for the original signatories, and 2015 for the CMLV countries.

== Rule of origin ==
The CEPT only applies to goods originating within ASEAN. The general rule is that local ASEAN content must be at least 40% of the FOB value of the good. The local ASEAN content can be cumulative, that is, the value of inputs from various ASEAN members can be combined to meet the 40% requirement. The following formula is applied:

( Raw material cost
+ Direct labour cost
+ Direct overhead cost
+ Profit
+ Inland transport cost )
x 100 % FOB value

However, for certain products, special rules apply:

- Change in Chapter Rule for Wheat Flour;
- Change of Tariff Sub-Heading for Wood-Based Products;
- Change in Tariff Classification for Certain Aluminum and Articles thereof.

The exporter must obtain a "Form D" certification from its national government attesting that the good has met the 40% requirement. The Form D must be presented to the customs authority of the importing government to qualify for the CEPT rate. Difficulties have sometimes arisen regarding the evidentiary proof to support the claim, as well as how ASEAN national customs authorities can verify Form D submissions. These difficulties arise because each ASEAN national customs authority interprets and implements the Form D requirements without much co-ordination.

== Administration ==
Administration of AFTA is handled by the national customs and trade authorities in each ASEAN member. The ASEAN Secretariat has authority to monitor and ensure compliance with AFTA measures, but has no legal authority to enforce compliance. This has led to inconsistent rulings by ASEAN national authorities. The ASEAN Charter is intended to bolster the ASEAN Secretariat's ability to ensure consistent application of AFTA measures.

ASEAN national authorities have also been traditionally reluctant to share or cede sovereignty to authorities from other ASEAN members (although ASEAN trade ministries routinely make cross-border visits to conduct on-site inspections in anti-dumping investigations). Unlike the EU or NAFTA, joint teams to ensure compliance and investigate non-compliance have not been widely used. Instead, ASEAN national authorities must rely on the review and analysis of other ASEAN national authorities to determine if AFTA measures such as rule of origin are being followed. Disagreements may result between the national authorities. Again, the ASEAN Secretariat may help mediate a dispute but has no legal authority to resolve it.

ASEAN has attempted to improve customs co-ordination through the implementation of the ASEAN Single window project. The ASEAN Single Window would allow importers to submit all information related to the transaction to be entered electronically once. This information would then be shared with all other ASEAN national customs authorities.

== Dispute resolution ==
Although these ASEAN national customs and trade authorities co-ordinate among themselves, disputes can arise. The ASEAN Secretariat has no legal authority to resolve such disputes, so disputes are resolved bilaterally through informal means or through dispute resolution.

An ASEAN Protocol on Enhanced Dispute Settlement Mechanism governs formal dispute resolution in AFTA and other aspects of ASEAN. ASEAN members may seek mediation and good offices consultations. If these efforts are ineffective, they may ask SEOM (Senior Economic Officials Meetings) to establish panel of independent arbitrators to review the dispute. Panel decisions can be appealed to an appellate body formed by the ASEAN Economic Community Council.

The Protocol has almost never been invoked because of the role of SEOM in the dispute resolution process. SEOM decisions require consensus among all ASEAN members, and since both the aggrieved party and the alleged transgressor are both participating in SEOM, such consensus cannot be achieved. This discourages ASEAN members from invoking the Protocol, and often they seek dispute resolution in other fora such as the WTO or even the International Court of Justice. This can also be frustrating for companies affected by an AFTA dispute, as they have no rights to invoke dispute resolution yet their home ASEAN government may not be willing to invoke the Protocol. The ASEAN Secretary General has listed dispute resolution as requiring necessary reform for proper administration of AFTA and the AEC.

== Further trade facilitation efforts ==
Efforts to close the development gap and expand trade among members of ASEAN are key points of policy discussion. According to a 2008 research brief published by the World Bank as part of its Trade Costs and Facilitation Project, ASEAN members have the potential to reap significant benefits from investments in further trade facilitation reform, due to the comprehensive tariff reform already realised through the ASEAN Free Trade Agreement.

This new analysis suggests examining two key areas, among others: port facilities and competitiveness in the Internet services sector. Reform in these areas, the report states, could expand ASEAN trade by up to 7.5% ($22 billion) and 5.7% ($17 billion), respectively. By contrast, cutting applied tariffs in all ASEAN members to the regional average in Southeast Asia would increase intra-regional trade by about 2% ($6.3 billion).

== Membership ==
ASEAN Countries with which ASEAN has free trade agreements

Countries that agree to eliminate tariffs among themselves:

- Brunei
- Indonesia
- Malaysia
- Philippines
- Singapore
- Thailand
- Vietnam
- Laos
- Myanmar
- Cambodia
- Timor-Leste

Regular Observers

- Papua New Guinea

The most recent ASEAN meeting was observed also by:

- China
- South Korea
- Japan
- India
- Russia
- Australia
- New Zealand

== Related free trade areas ==
- Regional Comprehensive Economic Partnership
- ASEAN–Australia–New Zealand Free Trade Area (AANZFTA) is a free trade area between ASEAN and ANZCERTA that was signed on 27 February 2009 and came into effect on 1 January 2010. Details of the AANZFTA agreement are available online.
- ASEAN–China Free Trade Area (ACFTA), in effect as of 1 January 2010
- ASEAN–India Free Trade Area (AIFTA), in effect as of 1 January 2010
- ASEAN–Japan Comprehensive Economic Partnership (AJCEP), in effect as of 1 December 2008
- ASEAN–Korea Free Trade Area (AKFTA), in effect as of 1 January 2010
- Comprehensive Economic Partnership for East Asia
