= Paperless trade =

E-Trade in UNESCAP

Paperless trade refers to "trade taking place on the basis of electronic communications, including exchange of trade-related data and documents in electronic form" in the Framework Agreement on Facilitation of Cross-border Paperless Trade in Asia and the Pacific, adopted at United Nations Economic and Social Commission for Asia and the Pacific in May 2016.

The enormous costs arising from the exchange of billions of trade-related documents, as well as the complexity of international trade documents and procedures, are a huge burden on businesses, and a major disincentive to many small firms for participating in international trade. Switching from paper documents would increase security and transparency in supply chains and provide governments and the private sector with higher revenues. Paperless trade aims to making cross-border business transactions more convenient and transparent while ensuring regulatory compliance.

In the report of "Paperless Trade in International Supply Chains: Enhancing Efficiency and Security", paperless trade is discussed from the perspectives of countries and private enterprises. It points out that the advance exchange of information and the automated analysis of trade data enable governments and enterprises to react faster on events and take appropriate measures to reduce costs and risks.

== Paperless trade facilitation measures ==
The implementation of paperless trade has increased significantly in the region of Asia and the Pacific. In contrast with Trade Facilitation measures, most paperless trade and, in particular, cross-border paperless trade measures, are not specifically featured in the WTO TFA, but drafted in the bilateral trade agreements. In 2015, the UN ESCAP collected and listed paperless trade and cross-border paperless trade measures as follows:

- Electronic/automated Customs System established (e.g., ASYCUDA)
- Internet connection available to Customs and other trade control agencies at border-crossings
- Electronic Single Window System
- Electronic submission of Customs declarations
- Electronic Application and Issuance of Trade Licenses
- Electronic Submission of Sea Cargo Manifests
- Electronic Submission of Air Cargo Manifests
- Electronic Application and Issuance of Preferential Certificate of Origin
- E-Payment of Customs Duties and Fees
- Electronic Application for Customs Refunds
- Laws and regulations for electronic transactions are in place (e.g. e-commerce law, e-transaction law)
- Recognized certification authority issuing digital certificates to traders to conduct electronic transactions
- Engagement of the country in trade-related cross-border electronic data exchange with other countries
- Certificate of Origin electronically exchanged between your country and other countries
- Sanitary & Phyto-Sanitary Certificate electronically exchanged between your country and other countries
- Banks and insurers in your country retrieving letters of credit electronically without lodging paper-based documents

Depending on how specific they are and the structure of each agreement, these measures may be found in e-commerce, customs or trade facilitation chapters. For example, in the Trans-Pacific Partnership Agreement, access to and use of the Internet for Electronic Commerce could be found in the chapter of E-commerce, which requires parties to "recognise the benefits of consumers in their territories having the ability to:

(a) access and use services and applications of a consumer's choice available on the Internet, subject to reasonable network management;

(b) connect the end-user devices of a consumer's choice to the Internet, provided that such devices do not harm the network;

(c) access information on the network management practices of a consumer's Internet access service supplier."
