= Single-window system =

Trade facilitation concept

A Single Window (SW) is a trade facilitation concept that enables traders and businesses to submit standardised information and documents through a single entry point to fulfil all regulatory requirements related to import, export, and transit. It simplifies and streamlines interactions with government authorities, thereby improving efficiency and reducing costs and delays in cross-border trade.

The National Single Window (NSW) system allows and consolidates traders to submit documentation and data requirements for importation, exportation, or transit of goods through a single entry point. This system aims to simplify trade procedures, reduce costs, and improve efficiency in international trade.

The Single Window (SW) is widely recognised as a key enabler of trade facilitation and has received global endorsement through international frameworks, conventions, and agreements. Its adoption is seen as a benchmark for modernising customs and trade procedures, improving transparency, and promoting seamless cross-border trade.

== Concept ==
Single window

The United Nations Centre for Trade Facilitation and Electronic Business (UN/CEFACT) introduced Recommendation No. 33 in 2005 (updated in 2020), which provides a widely recognized framework for implementing Single Window systems. It has become the authoritative reference point for understanding and implementing Single Window systems globally. It provides a comprehensive framework that balances standardisation with flexibility, allowing countries to adapt the Single Window concept to their specific needs while promoting international interoperability and trade facilitation.

UN/CEFACT Recommendation 33 defines a Single Window as:
"A facility that allows parties involved in trade and transport to lodge standardised information and documents with a single-entry point to fulfil all import, export, and transit-related regulatory requirements."

Recommendation 33 also encourages countries to:

- Develop legal frameworks to support electronic transactions.
- Promote public–private partnerships in building and maintaining the system.
- Facilitate international interoperability through data harmonisation and standardisation.

== Understanding single windows in trade regulation ==
The concept of 'Single Window' in trade regulation is specific and standardised, contrary to its frequent misuse. According to UN/CEFACT standards, a true Single Window for national trade regulation must possess five essential features:

1	Parties involved in trade and transport: This includes both public and private sector stakeholders
2	Standardized information and documents: The use of internationally recognised standards is crucial for coordination between stakeholders and countries
3	Single entry point: This refers to a facility where all data concerning a transaction should be submitted electronically. An economic operator should only need to submit their data to one such entry point for their transaction
4	Fulfilling regulatory requirements: This implies that a Single Window performs a government function and has received a relevant mandate from the government to carry out these actions
5	Single submission of individual data elements: Individual data elements should only be submitted once electronically

=== National Single Window (NSW) ===
A National Single Window (NSW) is the realisation of a true Single Window at the country level. NSWs primarily serve as a Business-to-Government (B2G) interface, with some evolving to include Business-to-Business (B2B) transactions. The World Trade Organization (WTO) Trade Facilitation Agreement (TFA) encourages member governments to establish or maintain an NSW under Article 10.4. This article is also the most frequently requested area for TFA-related technical assistance. National trade facilitation committees (NTFCs) typically guide and monitor NSW establishment, as per Article 23.1 of the TFA.

The implementation of national single windows (NSWs) across countries has shown significant progress.

According to the WTO Trade Facilitation Agreement Database, as of January 2025, the global rate of implementation of commitments on Single Window stands at 61%. This indicates that while many countries have made commitments to implement NSWs, full implementation is still ongoing for a significant number of nations.

==== Country-Specific Examples ====
Indonesia, Japan, Singapore, South Korea, Thailand are regarded as having relatively mature single window systems that cover all or most of their respective Other Government Agencies (OGAs).

Countries like Canada, Chile, Costa Rica, Kenya, New Zealand, Pakistan, Peru, Saudi Arabia and the US have deployed single windows but are still in progress toward covering all OGAs.

Other jurisdictions, including Australia, Bangladesh, the Maldives, and the United Kingdom, are continuing to strengthen their bases for single window implementation.

=== Regional Single Window (RSW) ===
Regional Single Windows extend beyond UN/CEFACT Recommendation 33, interlinking NSWs for Country-to-Country exchange. RSWs are Government-to-Government (G2G) focused and implemented under international frameworks as collaborative systems of NSW networks.

Examples of Regional Single Windows includes:

==== ASEAN Single Window (ASW) ====
The ASEAN Single Window (ASW) is a regional initiative that connects the National Single Windows (NSWs) of ASEAN member states to facilitate interoperability, streamline cross-border trade and reduces trade barriers within ASEAN. It enables the secure electronic exchange of trade documents, such as the Certificate of Origin (ATIGA e-Form D) for preferential tariffs, reducing processing times, costs, and enhancing regional economic integration.

==== European Union (EU) Single Window Environment for Customs ====
The European Union is exerting efforts on 'digital cooperation' under the Single Window Environment for customs. It is a framework designed to streamline customs processes across European Union member states. When fully implemented, it enables businesses to submit regulatory information through a single entry point, facilitating data exchange between customs and other authorities. This improves compliance, reduces administrative burdens, and enhances trade efficiency.

==== Pacific Alliance ====
The Pacific Alliance VUCE (Ventanilla Única de Comercio Exterior) is a regional Single Window system implemented by Chile, Colombia, Mexico, and Peru to streamline trade processes. It facilitates electronic data exchange, reduces paperwork, and enhances interoperability, promoting seamless trade, regulatory compliance, and economic integration among member countries.

=== Sector-Specific Platforms ===
It is important to distinguish Single Windows for trade regulation from sector-specific platforms:

1. Cargo Community System (CCS) for airports
2. Maritime Single Window (MSW) for maritime operations

=== Maritime Single Window (MSW) ===
The International Maritime Organization (IMO) defines a Maritime Single Window as a "one-stop service environment" for maritime procedures. It serves as a vessel operator-to-port interface, facilitating communication between private and public actors for procedures such as port entry/departure declarations and security reports. The IMO FAL Convention's amended Annex has made MSW mandatory for ports.

=== Misuse of the term "Single Window" ===
The term "Single Window" in trade facilitation is often misused, leading to confusion and potential abuse of the concept.

Examples of misuse include:

- Labelling basic online portals or information websites as Single Windows, despite lacking key features like standardised data submission or interagency coordination.
- Calling sector-specific platforms, such as Port Community Systems or Cargo Community Systems, Single Windows when they don't cover all import, export, and transit-related regulatory requirements.
- Misrepresenting partial implementations as full Single Windows, even when they only cover a limited number of agencies or processes.
- Using the term for systems that do not provide a single entry point for data submission or require multiple submissions of the same information.
- Applying the label to projects that lack government mandate or don't include all relevant cross-border regulatory agencies.

These misuses can lead to inflated claims about trade facilitation progress and hinder the development of true Single Window systems.

== Global recognition of the Single Window (SW) concept ==
The SW is globally recognised as an essential tool for improving trade facilitation and reducing trade barriers. Its adoption is driven by UN recommendations, WTO mandates, and regional trade agreements, making it a cornerstone of modern customs management. With continued support from international organizations and development banks, the Single Window is helping countries achieve greater transparency, efficiency, and integration in global trade networks.

=== United Nations Recognition ===
==== UN/CEFACT Recommendation No. 33 (2005) ====
The UN Centre for Trade Facilitation and Electronic Business (UN/CEFACT) defines and promotes the Single Window as a global standard for trade facilitation. Recommendation No. 33 has become the foundation for many national and regional Single Window implementations.

It advocates for data standardisation, interoperability, and collaboration between public and private sectors.

==== UNESCAP Framework ====
The United Nations Economic and Social Commission for Asia and the Pacific (UNESCAP) actively supports Single Window implementation across the Asia-Pacific region through the Framework Agreement on Facilitation of Cross-border Paperless Trade in Asia and the Pacific.

The framework promotes the use of paperless trade technologies and regional interoperability to facilitate trade flows.

==== World Trade Organization (WTO) Recognition ====
WTO Trade Facilitation Agreement (TFA) - Article 10.4

The WTO formally recognises the Single Window in Article 10.4 of the TFA, which mandates members to:

- Establish a Single Window to streamline regulatory procedures.
- Enable data sharing among authorities to reduce redundancy.
- Provide transparent and accessible systems for traders.

The TFA has made the adoption of Single Windows a global obligation for WTO members, fostering its widespread implementation.

==== World Customs Organization (WCO) Endorsement ====
The World Customs Organization (WCO) Revised Kyoto Convention (RKC), which promotes simplified customs procedures, endorses the use of Single Windows as a key mechanism for modernising customs processes.

The WCO Single Window Compendium offers practical guidance to customs authorities in implementing and operating Single Windows.
