= Pamela Coke-Hamilton =

Caribbean lawyer and trade expert

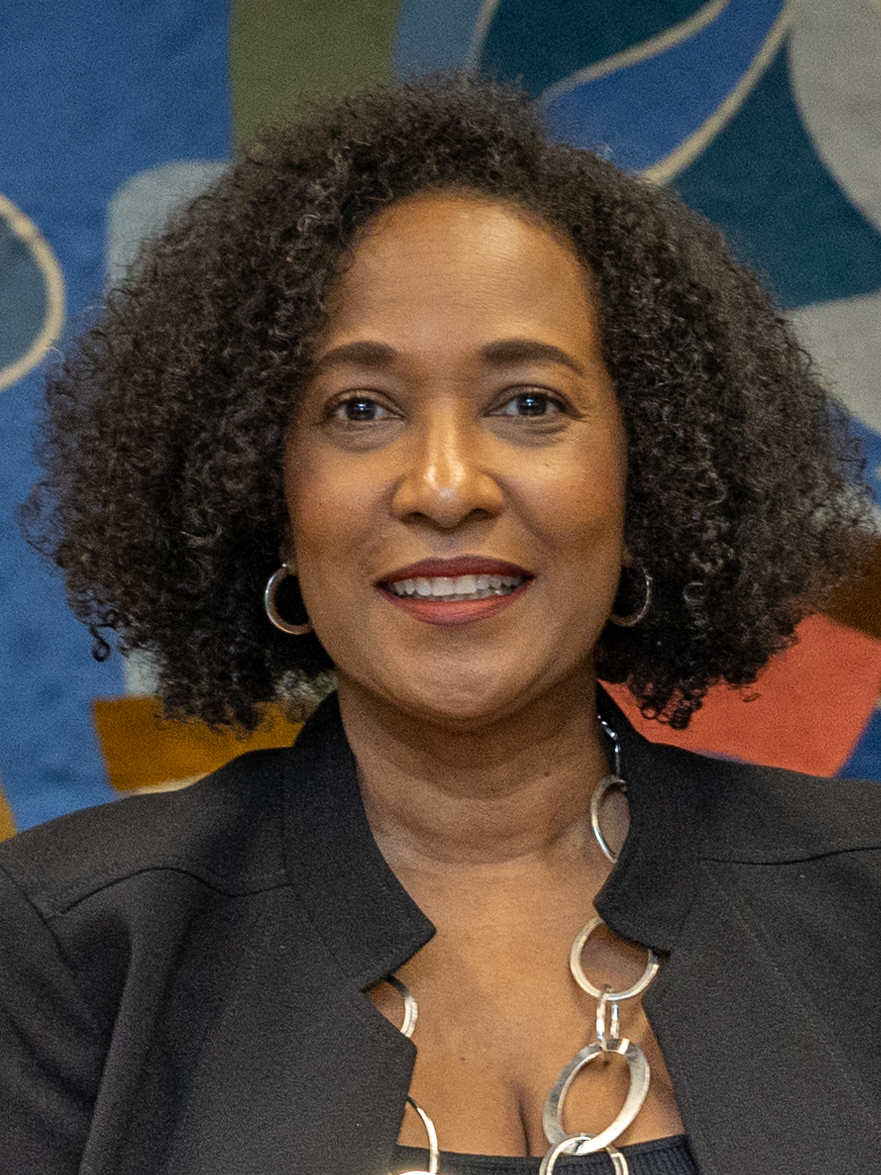
- Education: University of the West Indies; Georgetown University School of Law
- Occupations: Lawyer and trade expert
- Employer: International Trade Centre (ITC)
- Known for: Executive Director ITC

Pamela Rosemarie Coke-Hamilton is a Jamaican lawyer and trade expert who has been serving as Executive Director of the International Trade Centre (ITC) since 2020.

== Early life and education ==
Coke-Hamilton went to school in Jamaica at Manchester High School in Mandeville. She attended the University of the West Indies, where she graduated in Economics and International Relations. She went on to study in Washington, D.C., where she earned Doctor of Law from Georgetown University Law Center.

== Career ==
Coke-Hamilton began her career in Jamaica's Ministry of Foreign Affairs and Foreign Trade.

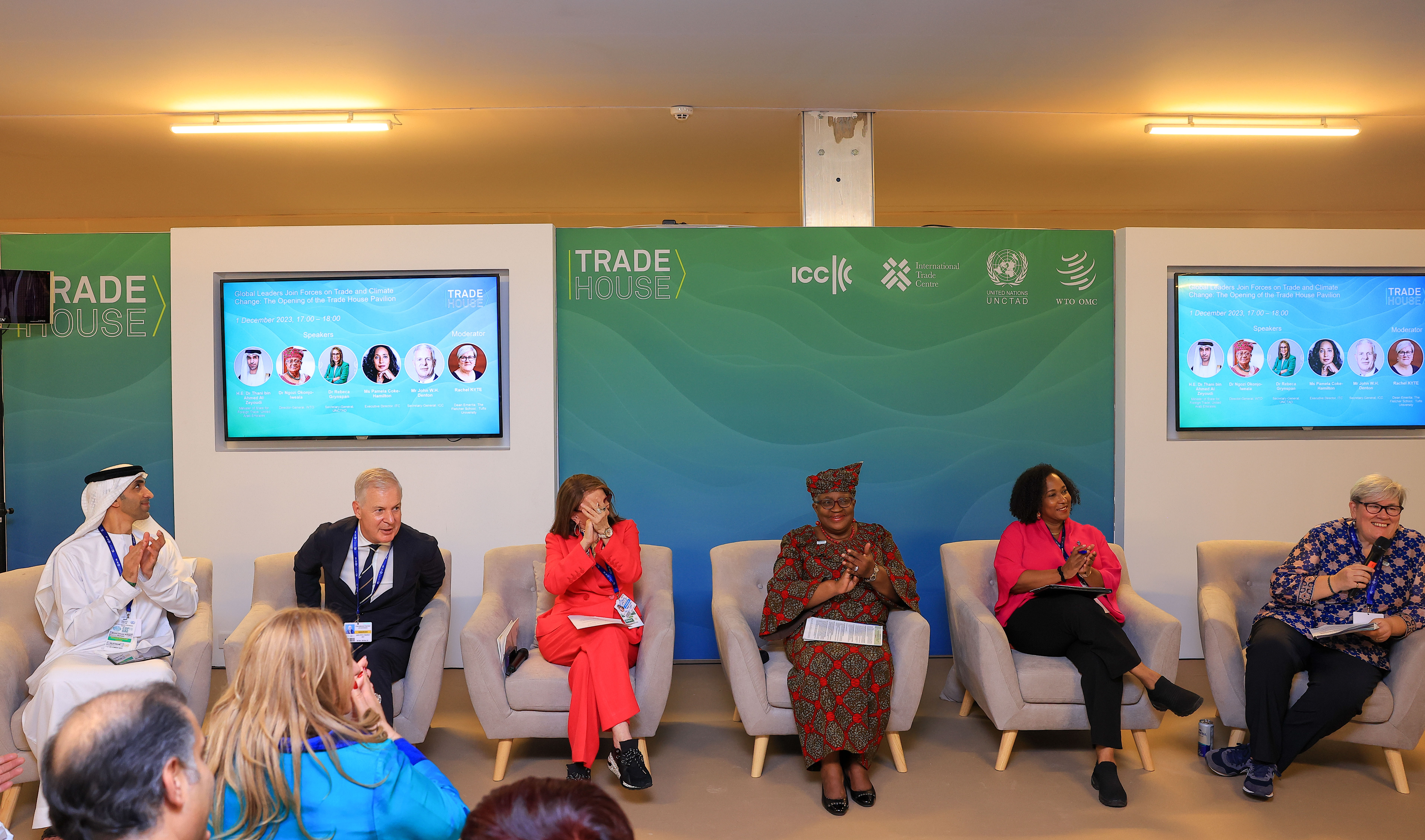
Pamela Coke-Hamilton et al at COP28

From 2007, Coke-Hamilton served as Director of Trade, Tourism and Competitiveness of the Organization of American States (OAS). to 2009. In 2008, she gave evidence to the United States International Trade Commission about Caribbean trade.

From 2011 until 2019, Coke-Hamilton served as Executive Director of the Caribbean Export Development Agency (CEDA). During her time in office, she established a "Caribbean exporter of the Year" and a "Women Empowered through Export Platform".

In November 2019, Pamela Coke-Hamilton warned of the lose-lose trade war that was emerging between the USA and China. It was damaging to all the consumers involved and it "compromises the stability of the global economy and future growth".

In July 2020, United Nations Secretary-General António Guterres appointed Coke-Hamilton as Executive Director of the International Trade Centre (ITC).

== Other activities ==
- International Gender Champions (IGC), Member (since 2020)

== Recognition ==
Coke-Hamilton was awarded an honorary doctorate by the University of the West Indies in recognition of the help she had given in helping them to establish a masters course in International Trade Policy.

== Publications include ==
- Accelerating Trade and Integration in the Caribbean: Policy Options for Sustained Growth, Job Creation, and Poverty Reduction, 2009, World Bank (co-author).
