= European Review of Agricultural Economics =

- Discipline: Agricultural economics
- Language: English
- Edited by: Ada Wossink

Publication details
- History: 1973–present
- Publisher: Oxford University Press
- Frequency: 5/year
- Impact factor: 3.836 (2020)

Standard abbreviations
- ISO 4: Eur. Rev. Agric. Econ.

Indexing
- ISSN: 0165-1587 (print); 1464-3618 (web)

Links
- Journal homepage; Online archive

The European Review of Agricultural Economics (ERAE) is a peer-reviewed scientific journal covering agricultural economics. It was established in 1973 and is published five times per year by Oxford University Press on behalf of the European Agricultural and Applied Economics Publications Foundation, which owns the journal. It is the official journal of the European Association of Agricultural Economists. The editor-in-chief is Ada Wossink (University of Manchester). According to the Journal Citation Reports, the journal has a 2020 impact factor of 3.836, ranking it 70th out of 377 journals in the category "Economics" and 6th out of 21 journals in the category "Agricultural Economics & Policy".
