= Trade facilitation and development =

Success in export markets for developed and developing country firms is increasingly affected by the ability of countries to support an environment which promotes efficient and low cost trade services and logistics. Trade facilitation and economic development policies reflect the idea that trade can be a powerful engine for accelerating economic growth, job creation, and poverty reduction.

== Background ==
World trade has expanded rapidly over the past decades. This has been driven, in large part, by the changing nature of both production and increased competition in international commerce. Another important factor contributing to the growth in trade has been the periodic rounds of successful multilateral trade negotiations. These talks at the World Trade Organization (WTO) have reduced tariffs on goods crossing national borders considerably. Today, as the role of traditional trade barriers gradually vanishes, the focus of trade policy has shifted to the remaining non-tariff barriers to trade, including trade facilitation.

Trade facilitation involves a wide range of activities centered on lowering trade transaction costs for firms in global commerce. These costs include the price of moving freight from the factory to final destinations. Firms must manage border clearance procedures and pay trade services fees, among many other steps after goods and services are produced. As such, trade facilitation involves much more than trucking goods across national borders or shipping a package by sea transport.

== Cross-country comparisons and performance ==
There is an increasing body of empirical evidence about the impact of trade facilitation on export competitiveness and growth. Studies reviewed by the Organisation for Economic Co-operation and Development (OECD, 2002) indicate that trade transaction costs amount to up to 15 percent of the value of traded goods globally. A subsequent OECD study (2003) found trade transactions costs to be higher on agricultural and food products, fish, and forest and wood products (since these products are subject to additional border procedures due to sanitary and phytosanitary requirements). These are products for which many developing countries have an advantage. The same study also reported that small and medium enterprises suffer most from poor trade-related practices and poorer developing countries have a larger share of such enterprises. A number of other studies have illustrated the specifics of why trade facilitation matters and specific sources of trade costs. One study, for example, found that barriers to export performance in Africa are closely related to firm characteristics and policies that raise trade costs. This includes non-transparent customs laws and administration. Much less evidence was found that transport infrastructure, in comparison, had a significant impact on export performance (Clarke, 2005).

== World Bank research ==
The World Bank is conducting extensive research on the issue of trade facilitation and its effects on trade, economic growth, and development. The main part of the research is carried out under the project Trade Costs and Facilitation. This project is focused on contributing to stronger understanding of the concrete relationships between trade costs, trade facilitation, private sector growth, and export competitiveness in developing countries. A major focus of the work is on exploring the dynamic gains associated with lowering trade transactions costs and identifying the relative importance of related reform measures.

The World Bank's Doing Business 2007: How to reform report (2007) documents the wide range of reform needed in developing countries to lower trade costs. The report outlines procedural requirements for importing and exporting a standardized cargo of goods in 155 countries. While the total cost to import (in US$ per container) was $842 on average in high-income countries, it was $1960 in low-income countries. Typical regulations in low-income countries required 13 documents from domestic regulatory agencies as compared to six signatures in high income countries, nine in upper-middle-income and ten in low-middle-income countries. On average it still costs almost two and a half times in expenses, more than twice as many documents and four times as many signatures to trade in a poor country as it does in rich countries.

The Doing Business report provides concrete examples of efficiency savings made possible through trade facilitation reforms. Much of these relate to addressing regulatory reform and other steps—that in contrast to hard infrastructure—constitute the major part of why engaging in trade takes longer in developing countries. Progress in reducing costs, however, has been made. For example, Guatemala with the support of the Inter-American Development Bank changed to an electronic system for export authorization in 2000. Within four years the time for authorization of export documents dropped from one day to around three minutes. Tunisia has also introduced an automated system that provides a one-stop trade documentation-processing platform. Due to this innovation the processing time for trade documentation became reduced from 18 to 7 days which probably had led to substantial productivity gains according to the United Nations Economic Commission for Africa.

== What are the gains from cutting trade costs? ==
There are important gains to lowering trade costs and facilitating trade with some variation across countries and sectors (Francois et al., 2005; OECD, 2003). Several studies have focused on the impact of trade facilitation on the micro-level (OECD, 2005). They observe that in some developing countries inefficient trade regulations, documents and procedures are hindering firms' participation in export markets. The studies find large potential benefits from streamlining trade regulations and hence cutting the costs for exporting.

Analysis by the World Bank suggests that raising global capacity in trade facilitation (port efficiency, customs, regulatory transparency, and information technology used in trade transactions) halfway to the global average would increase world trade by $377 billion (Wilson, et al. 2005). This is an increase of about 9.7 percent in global trade with the majority of the gains due to domestic reform and capacity building. About $107 billion of the total gain comes from the improvement in port efficiency and about $33 billion results from the improvement in customs environment. The gain from the improvement in regulatory environment is $83 billion. The largest gain ($154 billion) comes from an improvement in information technology infrastructure which is increasingly applied all across the trade value and logistics chain. The important work ahead to lower trade costs however is outside the scope of trade policy, therefore, and squarely centered within domestic reform agendas, including services such as transport, telecommunication, and others that affect trade transactions costs. There is also a key role to be played by private sector-led policy reform according to many of these studies.

== Trade costs and the multilateral trading system ==
Talks are underway on revisions to the WTO rules on trade facilitation in the Doha Development Agenda negotiations. The outlines of a possible agreement includes, among others: (1). New obligations to promote electronic distribution and transmission of government trade regulations on imports and exports; (2). Standardization of certain basic fees for imports; (3). Stronger rules to help ensure freedom of transit for goods crossing national borders.

In the WTO secretariat tabulation of proposals from August 11, 2006 there is consideration of more "ambitious" changes to current obligations, such as establishment of a single window for exporters and importers at customs or accepting copies of documents for import and export in lieu of originals. Since 2002 there have also been talks about explicit ties between a package of technical assistance and development aid as part of any final agreement. Developing countries participated very actively in these negotiations and before the suspension of the Doha Round in late 2006 considerable progress had been achieved (World Bank, 2006).

Changes to the multilateral trade rules noted above can help in advancing transparent and predictable trading procedures for exporters. These rules have not been revised in over 50 years and crafting an achievable and focused next step in the Doha Agenda will be helpful to traders. This is especially true for small and medium-sized firms that lack resources and networks to overcome some of the more complex border rules now in place. Meeting trade facilitation goals in a broader and deeper context, however, will require action well outside and beyond the WTO framework. More effective delivery of development aid and technical assistance especially in projects to advance regulatory reform and support public agencies that promulgate and administer trade regulations is needed. A better understanding of conditions under which developing countries are ready to receive such assistance so that aid is effectively delivered is required.

== The agenda ahead ==
At the most basic level, better data, analysis, and indicators of performance are needed to inform discussions moving forward on how trade costs and facilitation measures affect global commerce. Progress in reaching development goals in trade can only be made with accurate data and analysis to drive policy choice and action. Taking advantage of the energy behind reaching the Millennium Development Goals (MDGs), building on the datasets in the global monitoring reports which track progress in reaching poverty reduction goals, among other reports, makes significant sense. In sum, the data gathered to date illustrate the fact that the non-tariff agenda in trade is increasingly important to economic development ahead.

== Sources ==
- Clarke, G. 2005. Beyond Tariffs and Quotas: Why Don't African Manufacturers Export More? World Bank Policy Research Working Paper 3617.
- Grainger, A 2007. Trade Facilitation: A Review, Working Paper
- OECD. 2002. Business Benefits of Trade Facilitation.
- OECD. 2003. Quantitative Assessment of the Benefits of Trade Facilitation.
- OECD. 2005. Trade Facilitation Reforms in the Service of Development: Country Case Studies, TD/TD/WP (2004)4/FINAL.
- Wilson, J. S., Mann K. L., and Otsuki, T. 2005. Assessing the Benefits of Trade Facilitation: A Global Perspective, World Bank Policy Research Working Paper 3224.
- World Bank. 2006. Doing Business in 2007.
