= Trade Facilitation Agreement =

World Trade Organization multilateral agreement

The Trade Facilitation Agreement (TFA) is an international agreement which aims "to expedite the movement, release and clearance of goods, including goods in transit". It was confirmed at the Ninth Ministerial Conference of the World Trade Organization in Bali, Indonesia, in December 2013. After almost 20 years of negotiations, the agreement was officially an open invitation for acceptance from the 160 members of the World Trade Organisation (WTO) on 27 November 2014. However the agreement will only be ratified once 2/3 of the members have informed the WTO of their agreement. For the WTO, the agreement can be viewed as a historic achievement as it is the first multilateral agreement since its inception in 1995. The Trade Facilitation Agreement of 2014 is a global multilateral initiative to rationalise the stringent procedures which govern international trade. The principal focus of the Agreement is to have numerous positive consequences on developed and Least Developed Countries. Estimates have shown that the Trade Facilitation Agreement would reduce trade costs by an average of 14.5%. In turn, this would prospectively improve trade globally by on trillion dollars. This reduction in bureaucratic 'red tape' will have favourable effects on small and medium-sized businesses, making it easier for them to trade and join global value chains. One of the most significant aspects of this agreement, lies in the new principle that developing and Least Developed Countries commitments to the implementation of the provisions outlined by the agreement are conditioned on their procurement of necessary technical capacity.

== Historical context ==
=== 1990s ===
The members of the World Trade Organisation

The first trade facilitation discussions began in the mid-1990s. In 1996, the Singapore Ministerial Conference gave the WTO its initial directive, however under a different conceptual heading. The language used in the brief reflected a potential compromise between those wanting to renegotiate terms of a deal and those, primarily from the developing and Least Developed Countries who had their doubts about the success of new negotiations and preferred a much more narrow/limited program. Many of the doubts surrounding a prospective new multi-lateral trade agreement were surrounding concerns about not having the capabilities to take on any additional commitments, especially for developing and least developed countries. All of the developed countries supported the Trade Facilitation Agreement at this point, as well as a number of developing countries such as Chile, Colombia, Costa Rica, Republic of Korea, Paraguay and Singapore. However, it remained difficult to convince the affiliated nations to agree on multi-lateral negotiations. There was however no opposition to working and drafting the Trade Facilitation Act. The Act promised lower tariff barriers and non-tariff issues. However, most of the developing and least-developed countries were more in favour of an approach which encouraged these Guidelines to be followed opposed to a mandate of disciplines.

Work surrounding the Trade Facilitation Agreement continued after the Singaporean summit. The main purpose of these discussions was to gain an initial understanding of the scope of the agreement. Setting a clearly defined role for the WTO became a priority. The role the WTO would play began relatively broad. The earliest proposal indicated that the WTO would be in charge of payments, insurance and other financial requirements concerned with international trade. In the late 1990s an effort from a number of countries to make the WTO rules binding and not encouraged triggered a response to narrow the scope and focus on selected aspects of GATT. The two main areas of interest were Articles VIII and X of the GATT.

In late 1999, the ‘Colorado Group’, which was made up of predominantly developed countries and a few developing countries, began to promote the idea of a full negotiating mandate. However, this was met with a number of opposition. A number of members preferred to continue on the exploratory path instead of setting compulsory mandates. With numerous countries standing in opposition of each other, the ‘Colorado Group’ looking for certain mandates and the rest preferring to build upon three existing GATT disciplines in order to alleviate ‘red tape’ surrounding the trading procedures, the negotiations ended up breaking down. In the aftermath, efforts were allocated to trying to identify the positives and benefits that the Trade Facilitation Act can have on its members.

=== 2000s ===
It was not until 2001 at the Doha Ministerial that renewed efforts on the Trade Facilitation Negotiations began. The ‘Colorado Group’ was still attempting to increase their membership whilst their opposition were not inactive either. The Doha Ministerial was somewhat successful as it brought the two sides closer to negotiation. However, the negotiation process was yet to begin. The 2003 Cancún Ministerial in September emphasised that negotiations still remained elusive.

The Ministerial in Hong Kong 2005 represented the first concrete point of reference for Trade Facilitation talks. The writing had already been set in stone in Geneva and simply had to be confirmed at the Hong Kong Ministerial. There were however still concerns surrounding the Hong Kong Ministerial. Those who were in favour of a timely resolution of negotiations were concerned that an absence of real drafting would continue to delay processes. The developing and least-developed nations were still concerned about implementation processes. There was a lack of empirical evidence pointing to technical assistance and S&D, rather it was very general. In general, the impact of the Hong Kong Ministerial varied depending on who you asked. It was a landmark point in terms of inciting negotiation, but still little progress was made.

Subsequent action from the Hong Kong Ministerial did in fact not develop at speeds anticipated. It was not until December 2009, that the "Draft Consolidated Negotiation Text’ was circulated. This draft consisted of approximately 1700 square brackets, highlighting the main conflicting opinions. These brackets eventually expanded to approximately 2200 until it eventually started to come down. The chairman decided to appoint several organisers to try and reduce the amount of brackets. Eventually there were more than 14 facilitator groups working parallel on the issues and negotiations.

=== 2010s ===
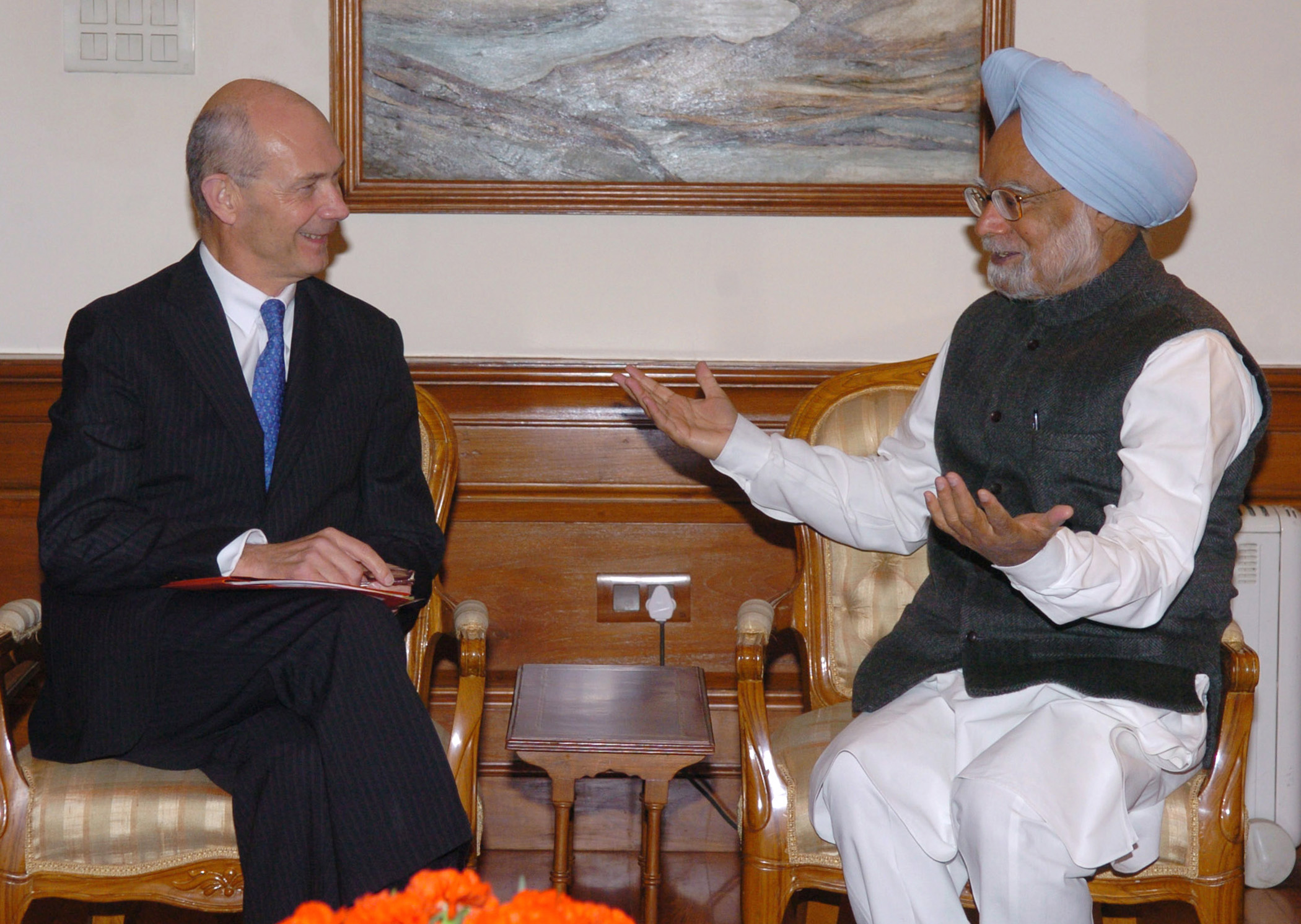
The Director General of the World Trade Organisation (Mr. Pascal Lamy)

In March 2013, the WTO decided that it was essential for higher-level management and involvement. The NGTF Chair chose 4 Ambassadors and separated the Draft into segments for each individual to refine. Mario Matus from Chile oversaw the transparency components as well as customs operations. Switzerlands representative Remigi Winzap was put in charge of articles 6–9. Fred Agah from Nigeria had the task of refining article 10 and finally Michael Stone from Hong Kong looked after S&D under section 2. In September 2013, the WTO's Director-General also stepped in to provide council. This came in the form of numerous negotiations and configurations, resulting in the resolve of many controversies and issues.

Just prior to the Bali Ministerial Conference in December, with the direct help of the Director general, the process of drafting had resulted in almost a clean text. The previous areas of disagreement was now only limited to a few members which was able to resolved in a bilateral meeting allowing them to return as members. Previous brackets of dispute and discontent were now bracket free, such as S&D and customs cooperation. While the Trade Facilitation Agreement was not fully completed by the Ministerial Conference it was in a good enough shape to be brought and completed there. The Ministerial Conference brought more rounds of negotiation and disagreement, however at the end the members were able to agree on a text for the Agreement. After a decade of negotiations, the WTO finally had their Trade Facilitation Agreement at the end of 2013, moving in to 2014.

== Contents ==
Article 1 is concerned with the publication and availability of information. Each member state is required to establish and maintain "one or more enquiry points to answer reasonable enquiries of governments, traders, and other interested parties" concerning trade.

UNECE also lists the following articles in particular in its information concerning the agreement:

- Article 5: other measures to enhance impartiality, non-discrimination and transparency
- Article 7: clearance of goods
- Article 8: border agency cooperation
- Article 9: movement of goods intended for import under customs control
- Article 10: formalities connected with importation, exportation and transit
- Article 11: freedom of transit
- Article 12: customs cooperation.

== List of ratified countries ==
	Ratified	Entry Date
Total:	142	
Hong Kong, China	R	8 December 2014
Singapore	R	8 January 2015
United States of America	R	23 January 2015
Mauritius	R	5 March 2015
Malaysia	R	26 May 2015
Japan	R	1 June 2015
Australia	R	9 June 2015
Botswana	R	18 June 2015
Trinidad and Tobago	R	27 July 2015
Korea, Republic of	R	30 July 2015
Nicaragua	R	4 August 2015
Nigeria	R	6 August 2015
Chinese Taipei	R	17 August 2015
Belize	R	2 September 2015
Switzerland	R	2 September 2015
China	R	4 September 2015
Liechtenstein	R	18 September 2015
Lao People's Democratic Republic	R	29 September 2015
New Zealand	R	29 September 2015
Togo	R	1 October 2015
Austria	R	5 October 2015
Belgium	R	5 October 2015
Bulgaria	R	5 October 2015
Croatia	R	5 October 2015
Cyprus	R	5 October 2015
Czech Republic	R	5 October 2015
Denmark	R	5 October 2015
Estonia	R	5 October 2015
Finland	R	5 October 2015
France	R	5 October 2015
(Germany)	R	5 October 2015
Greece	R	5 October 2015
Hungary	R	5 October 2015
Ireland	R	5 October 2015
Italy	R	5 October 2015
Latvia	R	5 October 2015
Lithuania	R	5 October 2015
Luxembourg	R	5 October 2015
Malta	R	5 October 2015
Netherlands	R	5 October 2015
Poland	R	5 October 2015
Portugal	R	5 October 2015
Romania	R	5 October 2015
Slovak Republic	R	5 October 2015
Slovenia	R	5 October 2015
Spain	R	5 October 2015
Sweden	R	5 October 2015
Thailand	R	5 October 2015
United Kingdom	R	5 October 2015
Republic of North Macedonia	R	19 October 2015
Pakistan	R	27 October 2015
Panama	R	17 November 2015
Guyana	R	30 November 2015
Côte d'Ivoire	R	8 December 2015
Grenada	R	8 December 2015
Saint Lucia	R	8 December 2015
Kenya	R	10 December 2015
Brunei Darussalam	R	15 December 2015
Vietnam	R	15 December 2015
Myanmar	R	16 December 2015
Norway	R	16 December 2015
Ukraine	R	16 December 2015
Zambia	R	16 December 2015
Georgia	R	4 January 2016
Lesotho	R	4 January 2016
Seychelles	R	11 January 2016
Jamaica	R	19 January 2016
Mali	R	20 January 2016
Cambodia	R	12 February 2016
Paraguay	R	1 March 2016
Turkey	R	16 March 2016
Brazil	R	29 March 2016
Macao, China	R	11 April 2016
United Arab Emirates	R	18 April 2016
Samoa	R	21 April 2016
India	R	22 April 2016
Russian Federation	R	22 April 2016
Albania	R	10 May 2016
Montenegro	R	10 May 2016
Kazakhstan	R	26 May 2016
Sri Lanka	R	31 May 2016
Saint Kitts and Nevis	R	17 June 2016
Madagascar	R	20 June 2016
Moldova, Republic of	R	24 June 2016
El Salvador	R	4 July 2016
Honduras	R	14 July 2016
Mexico	R	26 July 2016
Peru	R	27 July 2016
Saudi Arabia	R	28 July 2016
Afghanistan	R	29 July 2016
Senegal	R	24 August 2016
Uruguay	R	30 August 2016
Bahrain	R	23 September 2016
Bangladesh	R	27 September 2016
Philippines	R	27 October 2016
Iceland	R	31 October 2016
Chile	R	21 November 2016
Eswatini	R	21 November 2016
Dominica	R	28 November 2016
Mongolia	R	28 November 2016
Gabon	R	5 December 2016
Kyrgyz Republic	R	6 December 2016
Canada	R	16 December 2016
Ghana	R	4 January 2017
Mozambique	R	6 January 2017
Saint Vincent and the Grenadines	R	9 January 2017
Nigeria	R	16 January 2017
Nepal	R	24 January 2017
Chad	R	22 February 2017
Jordan	R	22 February 2017
Oman	R	22 February 2017
Rwanda	R	22 February 2017
Dominican Republic	R	28 February 2017
Guatemala	R	8 March 2017
Armenia	R	20 March 2017
Costa Rica	R	1 May 2017
Fiji	R	1 May 2017
Sierra Leone	R	5 May 2017
Qatar	R	12 June 2017
Gambia	R	11 July 2017
Malawi	R	12 July 2017
Congo, Republic of	R	5 October 2017
Antigua and Barbuda	R	27 November 2017
South Africa	R	30 November 2017
Indonesia	R	5 December 2017
Israel	R	8 December 2017
Central African Republic	R	11 January 2018
Argentina	R	22 January 2018
Bolivia, Plurinational State of	R	30 January 2018
Barbados	R	31 January 2018
Namibia	R	9 February 2018
Djibouti	R	5 March 2018
Papua New Guinea	R	7 March 2018
Cuba	R	12 March 2018
Benin	R	28 March 2018
Kuwait	R	25 April 2018
Uganda	R	27 June 2018
Burkina Faso	R	21 September 2018
Zimbabwe	R	17 October 2018
Cameroon	R	30 November 2018
Ecuador	R	15 January 2019
Angola	R	9 April 2019
Total:	142	

== Impact ==
=== Economic consequences ===
Currently, the cost of international trade stands at approximately $2 trillion. This is due to a variety of factors including, redundant customs procedures, border fees and unnecessary duplications. The economic benefit of the Trade Facilitation Agreement is still yet to be completely felt and measured. However, estimates of the economic gains as a result of the agreement is widespread. Estimates range from approximately $68 billion to nearly $1 trillion per year. According to the OECD, the Trade Facilitation Agreement has the capacity to reduce trade costs by 14.1% for low income countries, 15.1% for middle-income countries and 12.9% for high-middle-income countries. That would indicate a range of gains of approximately $9 to $133 a year per person on the planet. These large ranges indicate that there are still several uncertainties surrounding the trade deal.

=== Impact on developing and least developed countries ===
It became evident to the WTO that the provisions and mandates indicated the Trade Facilitation Agreement would be more difficult to implement for developing and least-developed countries. Therefore, the Trade Facilitation Agreement Facility was developed in order to provide assistance and support to these countries. The Trade Facilitation Agreement is projected to have a significantly positive impact on these countries, with an expected 14.5% reduction in total trade costs once the Agreement comes into force.

The Agreement will also help in making critical practical hurdles which govern International trade, redundant. The wealthier countries in the Agreement have committed to help reform developing countries technical and financial processes in order to increase efficiency. This in turn is hoped to reduce corruption such as bribes in these domestic regions. New technology and more efficient procedures which reduce the ‘red tape’ surrounding international trade is forecasted to limit corruption by limiting its necessity.

== Criticisms ==
Since the Trade Facilitation Agreement was pushed to be a non-binding document, rather a set of encouragements for developed, developing and least-developed countries to follow, it has left many developing and least-developed countries with doubts about whether the wealthier countries will fulfil their commitment of support. Many African nations are asking questions on how this Agreement is able to benefit them for not just international trade but also inter-regional trade. Many developing countries thus are still unable to fully commit to ratifying into this agreement. Developed countries have been able to show commitment to the agreement as they have the capacity to satisfy its requirements. However many nations such as India and China have only committed to respectively 70–75% of the Trade Facilitation Agreements measures.
