= International Trade Centre =

Multilateral agency

Coordinates: 46.217429°N 6.141458°E

- Abbreviation: ITC
- Predecessor: International Trade Information Centre
- Formation: 1964; 62 years ago
- Type: Intergovernmental organization
- Legal status: Active
- Headquarters: Geneva, Switzerland
- Region served: Worldwide
- Methods: Education, Publications, Training, Knowledge dissemination
- Fields: International development, Economic development
- Executive Director: Pamela Coke-Hamilton since July 2020
- Parent organization: World Trade Organization; United Nations
- Budget: CHF 116.24 million (2017)
- Staff: 299 (2017)
- Website: www.intracen.org

The International Trade Centre (ITC) (French: Centre du commerce international (CCI)) is a multilateral agency which has a joint mandate with the World Trade Organization (WTO) and the United Nations (UN) through the United Nations Conference on Trade and Development (UNCTAD).

The headquarters of the ITC are in Geneva, and the agency employs around 300 employees from over 80 different nationalities.

== History ==
The ITC is the successor to the International Trade Information Centre, which the General Agreement on Tariffs and Trade (GATT) established in 1964 to assist the exports of developing countries. An agreement was reached between the GATT and the newly established UNCTAD to create a joint subsidiary in 1967. The ITC was established on 1 January 1968. The ITC has a joint mandate with the World Trade Organization and the United Nations through the United Nations Conference on Trade and Development. The ITC is the focal point for trade-related technical assistance.

In 2026 the Trump administration announced the US was withdrawing from this organization, announcing that it is "redundant in their scope, mismanaged, unnecessary, wasteful, poorly run, captured by the interests of actors advancing their own agendas contrary to our own, or a threat to our nation's sovereignty, freedoms, and general prosperity".

== Funding ==
The work of the ITC is financed by a regular budget (RB) and its extra-budgetary resources (XB). The RB is made of equal yearly contributions from the UN and WTO as part of the organizations' budget cycle. The XB is made of voluntary contributions to the ITC Trust Fund (ITF) from the private sector, international organisations, donor governments, and other kinds of groups which can last multiple years. The XB can be divided into Window I (W1) (un-earmarked or soft-earmarked contributions) and Window II (W2) (hard-earmarked contributions). For 2025, the RB consisted of US$46 million, W1 was $7.7 million, and W2 was $107.3 million, a total of $161 million.

== See also ==
- United Nations
- World Trade Organization
- United Nations Conference on Trade and Development
- Trade and development
