= Trade facilitation =

Policies intended to encourage trade between nations

Trade facilitation looks at how procedures and controls governing the movement of goods across national borders can be improved to reduce associated cost burdens and maximise efficiency while safeguarding legitimate regulatory objectives. Business costs may be a direct function of collecting information and submitting declarations or an indirect consequence of border checks in the form of delays and associated time penalties, forgone business opportunities and reduced competitiveness.

Understanding and use of the term “trade facilitation” varies in the literature and amongst practitioners. "Trade facilitation" is largely used by institutions which seek to improve the regulatory interface between government bodies and traders at national borders. The WTO, in an online training package, has defined trade facilitation as “the simplification and harmonisation of international trade procedures”, where trade procedures are the “activities, practices and formalities involved in collecting, presenting, communicating and processing data required for the movement of goods in international trade”.

In defining the term, many trade facilitation proponents will also make reference to trade finance and the procedures applicable for making payments (e.g. via a commercial bank). For example, UN/CEFACT defines trade facilitation as "the simplification, standardization and harmonisation of procedures and associated information flows required to move goods from seller to buyer and to make payment".

Occasionally, the term trade facilitation is extended to address a wider agenda in economic development and trade to include: the improvement of transport infrastructure, the removal of government corruption, the modernization of customs administration, the removal of other non-tariff trade barriers, as well as export marketing and promotion.

The World Trade Report 2015 provides an overview of the various trade facilitation definitions from academia as well as various international organizations, contrasting them with the scope of the WTO Trade Facilitation Agreement (TFA) concluded in December 2013. The WTO TFA has become the new baseline for trade facilitation, with many countries striving to implement measures going beyond those included in this Agreement in order to maintain a competitive advantage in global markets. Notably, most countries have focused their trade facilitation efforts on establishing electronic single windows and other paperless trade systems to further reduce trade costs.

== Driving factors of the trade facilitation agenda ==
The trade facilitation objectives were introduced in the international agenda basically because of four main factors.

1) The successful implementation of the trade liberalization policy within the WTO frameworks caused the significant reduction of tariff and non-tariff barriers, that is common for developed countries (the average rate of customs duty from 4,5% to 6,5%, the share of duty free HS subheadings in customs tariffs from 29,2% to 53%). This reduced the revenue functions of customs and thus, the possibility of simplifying customs procedures with a moderate level of risk for national revenue opened up for a significant number of states.

2) The reduction of customs tariffs has caused the situation where the amount of import duties has become commensurate or even lower than trade transaction costs (TTC) with regards to compliance with customs and border formalities, since the latter are estimated on various data ranging from 1.5% to 15% of the transaction value. Respectively, trade transaction costs has started to be considered as the main trade barrier in the conditions of liberalized market access.

3) The industrial development in the modern global world based on the Global Value Chains (GVC) has transformed a cross-border movement of goods. Today, up to half of the total imports and exports of developed countries are “intermediate goods”, which are components of the corresponding GVCs. Accordingly, the cost of customs borders for business has increased significantly.

4) The expansion of production processes based on the principles of Just-In-Time (JIT) and of e-commerce shipments, which increased the requirements for the speed release of goods by customs.

== Examples of regulatory activity in international trade ==
Fiscal: Collection of customs duties, excise duties and other indirect taxes; payment mechanisms

Safety and security: Security and anti smuggling controls; dangerous goods; vehicle checks; immigration and visa formalities

Environment and health: Phytosanitary, veterinary and hygiene controls; health and safety measures; CITES controls; ships’ waste

Consumer protection: Product testing; labelling; conformity checks with marketing standards (e.g. fruit and vegetables)

Trade policy: Administration of quota restrictions; export refunds

== Topics and issues in trade facilitation ==
Trade facilitation has its intellectual roots in the fields of logistics and supply chain management. Trade facilitation looks at operational improvements at the interface between business and government and associated transaction costs. Trade facilitation has become a key feature in supply chain security and customs modernisation programmes. Within the context of economic development it has also come to prominence in the Doha Development Round. However, it is an equally prominent feature in unilateral and bilateral initiatives that seek to improve the trade environment and enhance business competitiveness. Reference to trade facilitation is sometimes also made in the context of "better regulation". Some organisations promoting trade facilitation will emphasize the cutting of red tape in international trade as their main objective. Propagated ideas and concepts to reforming trade and customs procedures generally resonate around the following themes:

- Simple rules and procedures
- Avoidance of duplication
- Memoranda of Understanding (MoUs)
- Alignment of procedures and adherence to international conventions
- Trade consultation
- Transparent and operable rules and procedures
- Accommodation of business practices
- Operational flexibility
- Public-service standards and performance measures
- Mechanisms for corrections and appeals
- Fair and consistent enforcement
- Proportionality of legislation and control to risk
- Time-release measures
- Paperless trade
- Risk management and trader authorisations
- Standardisation of documents and electronic data requirements
- Automation
- International electronic exchange of trade data
- Single Window System
