= Accession of the United Kingdom to CPTPP =

UK addition to the CPTPP

Accession of the United Kingdom to the Comprehensive and Progressive Agreement for Trans-Pacific Partnership
- CPTPP Signatories United Kingdom Crown Dependencies and Overseas Territories
- Type: Free Trade Agreement and Economic Integration Agreement
- Signed: 16 July 2023
- Location: Auckland, New Zealand and Bandar Seri Begawan, Brunei
- Effective: 12; Australia; Brunei; Canada; Chile; Japan; Malaysia; Mexico; New Zealand; Peru; Singapore; United Kingdom; Vietnam
- Condition: 60 days after ratification by the UK and all 11 (or 15 months after signature by 6) CPTPP members
- Signatories: 12; Australia; Brunei; Canada; Chile; Japan; Malaysia; Mexico; New Zealand; Peru; Singapore; United Kingdom; Vietnam
- Depositary: Government of New Zealand
- Languages: English; French; Spanish

The accession of the United Kingdom to the Comprehensive and Progressive Agreement for Trans-Pacific Partnership (CPTPP) has been on the current agenda for the enlargement of the CPTPP since 2 June 2021, when the CPTPP Commission decided to move forward with the application of the United Kingdom as an aspirant economy. The United Kingdom officially applied for CPTPP membership on 1 February 2021. Accession negotiations between the UK and the 11 current CPTPP members negotiations were concluded on 31 March 2023. The UK formally signed the accession protocol on 16 July 2023. The UK and at least 6 of the 11 existing member nations will need to ratify the accession protocol before it takes effect. The UK Government expected the entry into force to take place in the second half of 2024. On 29 August 2024, the UK government announced the agreement is expected to enter into force on 15 December 2024, after securing the final ratification required for membership.

The United Kingdom became the first non-original member and European country to join CPTPP. The UK's membership currently covers all three Crown Dependencies, these are Guernsey, Jersey, and the Isle of Man.

== History ==
Following its withdrawal from the European Union on 31 January 2020, the United Kingdom began negotiations on several free trade agreements to remove or reduce tariff and non-tariff barriers to trade, both to establish new agreements and to replace previous EU trade agreements. Withdrawal ended 47 years of membership during which all its trading agreements were negotiated by the European Commission on behalf of the bloc. The UK did not actually withdraw from the European Single Market and the European Union Customs Union (and its trade agreements) until 31 December 2020.

Following its failure to secure a United Kingdom–United States free trade agreement, Britain had been reportedly interested in joining several multilateral free trade agreements including USMCA. In January 2018, the government of the United Kingdom stated it was exploring membership of the CPTPP to stimulate exports after Brexit and has held informal discussions with several of the members.

In October 2018, Japanese Prime Minister Shinzo Abe said he would welcome the United Kingdom joining the partnership post-Brexit. In a joint Telegraph article with Simon Birmingham, David Parker, and Chan Chun Sing, the trade ministers of Australia, New Zealand, and Singapore, UK Secretary of State for Trade, Liz Truss, expressed the United Kingdom's intent to join the CPTPP. The UK Department for Trade's chief negotiator Crawford Falconer helped lead the New Zealand negotiations for the predecessor Trans-Pacific Partnership before leaving the Ministry of Foreign Affairs and Trade in 2012.

In June 2020, the government of the United Kingdom issued a policy paper reaffirming the UK's position on accession to the CPTPP. There were three reasons given:

- Securing increased trade and investment opportunities that will help the UK economy overcome the unprecedented challenge posed by coronavirus. Joining CPTPP would open up new opportunities for UK exporters in strategically important sectors and helping to support an industrial revival in the UK
- Helping the United Kingdom diversify trading links and supply chains, and in doing so increasing economic security at a time of heightened uncertainty and disruption in the world.
- Assisting the UK's future place in the world and advancing the UK's longer-term interests. CPTPP membership is an important part of our strategy to place the UK at the centre of a modern, progressive network of free trade agreements with dynamic economies. Doing so would turn the UK into a global hub for businesses and investors wanting to trade with the rest of the world.

Furthermore, the British government stated that in 2019, each region and constituent country of the United Kingdom exported at least £1 billion ($1.25 billion) worth of goods to CPTPP member countries. The UK government also highlighted that British companies held close to £98 billion worth of investments in CPTPP countries in 2018 and that in 2019, the UK did more than £110 billion ($137 billion) worth of trade with countries in the CPTPP free trade area. In December 2020 the UK's Secretary of State for Trade Liz Truss further expressed her desire for the UK to formally apply in early 2021. In a speech, held on 20 January 2021, Truss announced the UK planned to submit an application for participation "shortly". In October 2020 the United Kingdom and Japan already signed the UK–Japan Comprehensive Economic Partnership Agreement which was a roll over of the agreement between the EU and Japan.

The British government had not produced an impact assessment explaining or quantifying the benefits it expects for the UK economy from accession to CPTPP. It has been disputed whether accession is worth pursuing for economic reasons. Farmer, environmental and consumer groups, and the Scottish government, raised concerns that the UK government would need to agree to lowering standards on pesticides, pig welfare and food labelling.

== Negotiations ==
CPTPP Signatories United Kingdom Crown Dependencies and Overseas Territories

On 1 February 2021, the United Kingdom formally applied to join CPTPP. The UK is the first non-founding country to apply to join the CPTPP. If successful, Britain would become the second largest CPTPP economy, after Japan. Japan had expressed support for the UK's potential entry into CPTPP in 2018, and as 4th CPTPP Commission (2021) chair, Japan's minister in charge of negotiations on the trade pact, Yasutoshi Nishimura, expressed hope on Twitter that Britain will "demonstrate its strong determination to fully comply with high-standard obligations" of the free trade accord, and mentioned that "I believe that the UK's accession request will have a great potential to expand the high-standard rules beyond the Asia-Pacific."

In June 2021, the CPTPP states agreed to open accession talks. A working group was established to discuss tariffs and rules governing investment and trade. The United Kingdom was forecast to accede to the CPTPP at 2022 at the earliest.

Prior to its withdrawal, the United Kingdom had agreed to 36 free trade agreements with countries and trade blocs, the majority of which entered force on 1 January 2021. 33 of these free trade agreements were continuity agreements. These used a mutatis mutandis concept to quickly replicate the existing EU agreements, only having to call out those minor areas of differentiation. This meant that the UK had continuity free trade agreements with 6 CPTPP members, these were: Canada, Chile, Mexico, Peru, Singapore, and Vietnam.

The UK and Japan had also signed the Comprehensive Economic Partnership agreement in October 2020 which was mostly based on Japan–European Union Comprehensive Economic Partnership Agreement, but was branded as "marking an historic moment" as the "UK's first major trade deal as an independent trading nation". In addition, two further new agreements were signed with Australia, on 17 December 2021, and New Zealand, on 28 February 2022. This meant that the UK had free trade agreements signed with all members of CPTPP, except for Brunei and Malaysia, by the end of February 2022.

On 18 February 2022, confirmation came from the Japanese government, as Chair of the United Kingdom's Accession Working Group on behalf of the CPTPP members, that the UK had moved into the second (and final) 'market access' phase of negotiations with the CPTPP.

On 31 March 2023, the United Kingdom concluded negotiations to join the CPTPP, as the 11 members reached an agreement to Britain's accession. Each of the existing member nations will need to ratify the UK's addition to the partnership before it takes effect.

The United Kingdom negotiated on behalf of the Crown Dependencies and the British Overseas Territories during free trade agreement discussions. On 31 March 2023, the UK government announced it had secured an extension mechanism, which could extend the whole agreement to any Crown Dependency or Overseas Territory. On the same day, Guernsey and Jersey confirmed their intentions to participate in CPTPP. In May 2023, a UK government spokesman confirmed that "the deal will cover goods trade between the Crown Dependencies and CPTPP countries, with a mechanism to include trade in services in future."

On 17 April 2023 on the occasion of G7 Foreign Ministers' Meeting in Karuizawa, Foreign Secretary, James Cleverly attended a bilateral meeting with Japan's Minister for Foreign Affairs, Yoshimasa Hayashi. The two ministers affirmed to continue advancing the UK's accession process to the CPTPP, and they engaged in a candid discussion from a strategic perspective.

The United Kingdom formally signed the CPTPP accession protocol during the ministerial meeting of members in New Zealand on 16 July 2023.

== Areas covered in the agreement ==
=== Agreement overview and structure ===
As a part of its accession to the CPTPP, the United Kingdom agreed to the existing CPTPP treaty text. The negotiations mainly focused on market access commitments and separate bilateral arrangements known as "side letters". The agreement covers trade in goods and services, investment, government procurement, intellectual property, digital trade, technical regulations, food safety, labour rights and environmental protection.

The UK Department for Business and Trade estimated that joining the CPTPP agreement will increase long-term trade between the UK and other CPTPP member countries by £4.9 billion. UK government economic modelling reported by the House of Commons Library estimated that the agreement will increase the UK's long-term gross domestic product by £2 billion, which is around 0.06%.

=== Trade in goods and tariffs ===
Under the CPTPP agreement, more than 99% of UK goods currently exported to other CPTPP member countries can qualify for trade without tariffs. For example, tariff reductions include:

- Whisky: Malaysia will over time gradually remove its tariffs of around 80% on UK whisky over a period of 10 years.
- Cars: Malaysia will gradually over time remove tariffs of up to 30% on UK cars.
- Consumer and industrial goods: Vietnam will reduce tariffs on UK exports of products like engines and medicines sooner than previous bilateral agreements.

In order to qualify for tariff-free trade, goods must meet the CPTPP agreement's rules of origin. The agreement allows "accumulation", which lets UK manufacturers count components and materials from any CPTPP member country as originating within the partnership when producing finished goods.

=== Farming, food standards and agriculture ===
The CPTPP agreement provides UK farmers and food producers with greater access to overseas markets. UK producers are expected to have greater access to dairy markets in Canada, Japan and Mexico alongside meat markets in Mexico and Peru. In order to protect UK farmers from unexpected increases in imports, the agreement sets permanent limits (known as tariff-rate quotas), on certain agricultural products. For example, on:

- Beef: A shared limit for tariff-free imports from Brunei, Canada, Chile, Malaysia, Mexico and Peru will over time gradually increase to 13,000 tonnes a year after 10 years.
- Pork: A shared limit for tariff-free imports from Brunei, Canada, Chile, Malaysia, Mexico and Peru will over time gradually increase to 55,000 tonnes a year after 10 years.
- Poultry (chicken): A shared limit for tariff-free imports of chicken meat from Brunie, Canada, Chile, Malaysia, Mexico, and Peru will over time gradually increase to 10,000 tonnes a year after 10 years.
- Milled rice and sugar: After a period of 10 years, for milled rice the annual limit for tariff-free imports will reach 10,000 tonnes for Brunei, Chile, Malaysia and Peru and 25,000 tonnes for sugar from Brunei, Chile, Malaysia, Peru and Vietnam.

Joining the CPTPP agreement does not change existing bans of food that has been produced using growth hormones, including hormone-treated beef, or substances like ractopamine in pork. Assessments by the Trade and Agricultural Commission as well as the UK government have come to the conclusion that the agreement allows the UK to maintain its human health standards, animal welfare standards and environmental standards.

However, some UK farming, animal welfare and environmental organisations raised concerns about the agreement. For example, the National Farmers Union welcomed the chance of increased imports to Asian markets but at the same time argued that the combined effects of multiple free trade agreements could place extra pressure on UK farmers facing high animal feed costs and energy costs. The National Farmers Union also said that although existing food safety rules would stay in place, the agreement did not require all imports to meet the same production standards as UK products. As a result of this, they called for minimum standards for imported food.

In addition to this, the RSPCA and the British Egg Industry Council raised concerns about the gradual removal of tariffs over a 10 year period on egg products from countries like Mexico where conventional battery cages remain allowed. At the same time, Greenpeace UK and World Wildlife Fund shared concern that getting rid of tariffs on palm oil could increase imports associated with deforestation in Malaysia. In response, official assessments stated that the UK would keep the authority to set health and environmental regulations, subject to the agreement and World Trade Organization rules. Official assessments also stated that the UK could use exceptions allowed for measures aimed to protect "public morals" which covers animal welfare and domestic policy objectives.

=== Services and financial services ===
Services accounted for 45% of total trade between the UK and other CPTPP member countries in 2022. UK service exports to these CPTPP member countries was estimated to be worth £32.2 billion in 2022. The agreement uses a "negative list" approach to trade in services which is where service sectors are covered unless a specific CPTPP member country lists a specific exception. In sectors that are covered, CPTPP member countries cannot in general limit the number of service suppliers, require foreign businesses to establish local offices or treat foreign providers less favorably than domestic providers. In addition to this, decisions about public supervises including the National Health Service and public service broadcasting still remain under UK control.The CPTPP agreement does not automatically recognize professional qualifications from other CPTPP member countries, but it doe encourage professional bodies to put in place mutal recognition agreements, particularly for legal and engineering services.

A separate chapter on financial services in the agreement sets rules on market access, fair treatment and regulatory transparency.It also allows UK fund managers to manage investment funds for clients in other CPTPP countries remotely from the UK. Business groups like the Federation of Small Businesses, TheCityUK and the City of London Corporation welcomed the greater certainty, clearer domestic regulation and mechanisms for keeping markets open in the future provided by the CPTPP agreement. However, at the same time, trade experts from the UK Trade Policy Observatory as well as the House of Lords International Agreements Committee reported that even though the CPTPP agreement was advanced when first introduced, some recent UK trade agreements with Japan, Australia and New Zealand contained stronger commitments in certain areas.

=== Investment and investor-state dispute settlement ===
The CPTPP agreement protects foreign investors from unfair, arbitrary or discriminatory treatment as well as unlawful seizure of their land or assets. The agreements investor-state dispute settlement system (ISDS) lets foreign investors bring forward claims against governments through independent arbitration if they think the agreement's investment rules have been broken. Environmental and civil society groups like the Trade Justice Movement, Friends of the Earth, Global Justice Now and War on Want have raised concerns that the ISDS could lead to "regulatroy chill", where governments might avoid introducing public health or net-zero policies because of potential legal claims from foreign businesses.

However, UK ministers and official assessments have said that the agreement protects the government's right to regulate in the interest of the public. In addition to this, they have also said that the UK has never lost an ISDS case. At the same time, through separate bilateral agreements known as "side letters", the UK, Australia and New Zealand agreed that ISDS would not apply between them. In addition to this, government decisions to stop investments for national security or public interest reasons are also protected from ISDS claims through "side letters" with Malaysia, Singapore and Vietnam.

=== Business travel (temporary entry) ===
The chapter on "Temporary Entry for Business Persons" in the CPTPP agreement sets rules for business travel, with it covering business visitors, staff transferred within a business and contract workers as well as self-employed professionals and investors. It also allows UK business visitors to stay for up to 6 months in Peru and Vietnam, with this being double the previous limit, and for up to 12 months in Malaysia across 19 economic sectors. In addition to this, staff transferred to overseas branches can also bring family members, while their partners can work in some countries like Canada. At the same time, the UK government said in official assessments that these arrangements operate within the UK's point-based immigration system and that they do not provide a route to permanent residence, citizenship, or permanent employment in the UK.

== Accession protocol ==
After the UK became a signatory on 16 July 2023, the accession protocol allowed 15 months for each member nation to ratify the agreement, which would then take effect 60 days later. Member nations, consequently, had until 16 October 2024 to ratify. The protocol could have entered into force in one of two ways:

1. If the UK and each of the existing member nations had ratified the “Protocol on the Accession of the United Kingdom of Great Britain and Northern Ireland to the Comprehensive and Progressive Agreement for Trans-Pacific Partnership” within the 15 months.
2. If the UK and at least six (6) CPTPP member countries had ratified the agreement within the 15 months. Member countries that ratified later would have become parties to the protocol 60 days later.

The agreement has been ratified by the latter process and therefore entered into force on 15 December 2024 with eight (8) countries. The agreement entered into force with Australia and Mexico on 24 December 2024 and 22 June 2026 respectively. Canada also ratified the accession protocol, and the agreement entered into force on 1 September 2026.

=== Application timeline ===
Event	Date	Ref.
Application submitted	1 February 2021	
Accession process opened	2 June 2021	
Negotiations concluded	31 March 2023	
Formal signature	16 July 2023	
Existing member ratifications	11 / 11	
UK domestic ratification	15 May 2024	
UK deposition of accession instrument	16 May 2024	
Full membership	15 December 2024	

=== Ratification process ===
Signatory	Ratified	Institution	In favour	Against	AB	Deposited	Effective	Ref.
Australia	9 October 2024	House of Representatives	Majority approval (Standing vote)			25 October 2024	24 December 2024	
Australia	10 October 2024	Senate	Majority approval (Standing vote)			25 October 2024	24 December 2024	
Australia	24 October 2024	Royal assent	Granted			25 October 2024	24 December 2024	
Brunei	16 October 2024	No parliamentary approval required				16 October 2024	15 December 2024	
Canada	12 March 2026	House of Commons	Passed			3 July 2026	1 September 2026	
Canada	28 April 2026	Senate	Passed			3 July 2026	1 September 2026	
Canada	6 May 2026	Royal assent	Granted			3 July 2026	1 September 2026	
Chile	3 April 2024	No congressional approval required				3 April 2024	15 December 2024	
Japan	20 November 2023	House of Representatives	Majority approval (Standing vote)			15 December 2023	15 December 2024	
Japan	6 December 2023	House of Councillors	Majority approval (Standing vote)			15 December 2023	15 December 2024	
Malaysia	17 September 2024	Cabinet of Malaysia				17 September 2024	15 December 2024	
Mexico	10 December 2025	Senate	104	0	0	23 April 2026	22 June 2026	
Mexico	15 January 2026	Presidential Assent	Granted			23 April 2026	22 June 2026	
New Zealand	4 June 2024	No parliamentary approval required				4 June 2024	15 December 2024	
Peru	20 August 2024	President	Granted			28 August 2024	15 December 2024	
Singapore	17 January 2024	No parliamentary approval required				17 January 2024	15 December 2024	
Vietnam	25 June 2024	National Assembly	459	0	1	1 August 2024	15 December 2024	

=== Domestic Process in the United Kingdom ===
Trade (Comprehensive and Progressive Agreement for Trans-Pacific Partnership) Act 2024
- Act of Parliament
- Parliament of the United Kingdom
- Long title: An Act to enable the implementation of, and the making of other provision in connection with, the Comprehensive and Progressive Agreement for Trans-Pacific Partnership.
- Citation: 2024 c. 6
- Introduced by: Kemi Badenoch, Business Secretary (Commons); Lord Johnson, Minister of State for Investment (Lords)
- Territorial extent: United Kingdom (England and Wales, Scotland, Northern Ireland)

Dates
- Royal assent: 20 March 2024

Status: Partly in force

History of passage through Parliament

In an article published on 4 November 2023 in the UK newspaper the Daily Express, the UK Business and Trade Secretary Kemi Badenoch confirmed that the process of ratification for CPTPP accession was to commence shortly – stating that "in the coming weeks, we will bring forward a Bill to confirm our membership of CPTPP and ensure businesses can start seizing the historic opportunities the deal offers."

On 7 November, the UK government (via a proclamation from King Charles III) announced in the State Opening of Parliament that a bill would be brought forward to ratify the UK's accession to the CPTPP – saying that "My ministers will take steps to make the economy more competitive, taking advantage of freedoms afforded by the United Kingdom's departure from the European Union, a bill will be brought forward to promote trade and investment with economies in the fastest growing region in the world."

The name of the bill was confirmed in press briefings ahead of the King's Speech to be the "Trade (Comprehensive and Progressive Agreement for Trans-Pacific Partnership) Bill"

The fact that an Act of Parliament is required in order to bring effect to the CPTPP accession, means that there are clauses agreed to within the accession protocol that require primary legislation in order to bring the agreement fully into place. This means that the accession protocol itself, as well as the CPTPP Bill, will need to pass through Parliament in order to complete the ratification process. And the bill completed all the parliamentary stages and received Royal Assent on 20 March 2024.

As part of the Trade Act 2021, and as amended into the Agriculture Act 2020, the UK government must ensure that two reports are produced prior to commencing the CRaG process of treaty ratification:

- A report from the Trade and Agriculture Commission (TAC) on whether, or to what extent, the measures in the UK-CPTPP accession agreement that are applicable to trade in agricultural products are consistent with the maintenance of UK levels of statutory protection in relation to animal or plant life or health; animal welfare; and environmental protections
- Following the TAC report, a government produced report summarising the expected impact (if any) the agreement will have in relation to animal or plant life or health; animal welfare; and environmental protections

The TAC were formally requested to commence work on the CPTPP report on 17 July 2023, with an expected delivery date of the report of no later than 30 November 2023.

On 15 May 2024, the Instrument of Accession to the CPTPP was signed and sealed by Foreign Secretary David Cameron.

On 16 May 2024, the United Kingdom completed the formal ratification of its accession to CPTPP, and deposited its instrument of accession in New Zealand.

Timeline

Signatory	Application	Negotiations		Signature	Institution	Passed	In favour	Against	AB	Deposited	Effective	Ref.
United Kingdom	1 February 2021	Opened	2 June 2021	16 July 2023	House of Lords	23 January 2024	Majority approval (Voice vote)			16 May 2024	8 of 11: 15 December 2024	
United Kingdom	1 February 2021	Concluded	31 March 2023	16 July 2023	House of Commons	19 March 2024	Majority approval (Voice vote)			16 May 2024	9 of 11: 24 December 2024	
United Kingdom	1 February 2021	Concluded	31 March 2023	16 July 2023	Royal assent	20 March 2024	Granted			16 May 2024	10 of 11: 22 June 2026	
United Kingdom	1 February 2021	Concluded	31 March 2023	16 July 2023	Royal assent	20 March 2024	Granted			16 May 2024	11 of 11: 1 September 2026	

== Membership ==
The United Kingdom attended its first CPTPP meeting after signing the accession protocol on 15 November 2023 in California, on the sidelines of the 30th Asia-Pacific Economic Cooperation summit in San Francisco.

== Response ==
Domestic economists and media outlets criticised Prime Minister Rishi Sunak's assertion that CPTPP "demonstrates the real economic benefits of our post-Brexit freedoms", citing the International Agreements Committee report that states that the percentage increase in the United Kingdom's GDP provided by CPTPP membership is only 0.08%. Economist Sam Lowe also pointed out that this figure is low due to the UK already having bilateral free trade agreements with all member states, with the exceptions of Brunei and Malaysia. In a report released with the 2023 Autumn statement, the Office for Budget Responsibility calculated that Britain's economy would gain just 0.04% to GDP in the "long run", which it defined as after 15 years of membership. Trade expert David Henig stated that benefits from Britain's accession to the trade bloc impact had been "hugely overhyped", adding that "some companies will benefit, but the effects will be very small".

Business and Trade Committee chair Liam Byrne criticised the Government for "dodging" scrutiny of the UK's accession to CPTPP, demanding MPs should have had more time to debate the treaty.

In contrast, the Centre for European Reform estimated that the costs of leaving the European Union have reduced the UK's GDP by 5.5%, provoking criticism from prominent media outlets as to the extent of the benefits of CPTPP, particularly as an alternative to the European Economic Area. However, due to the high growth of the UK economy in comparison to Germany between 2016 and 2022, these estimates have been repudiated by Brexit advocates. In March 2024, the Office for Budget Responsibility (OBR) reported that the UK is "broadly on track" to show a 4% reduction in the UK economy's potential productivity, as well as a 15% fall in trade compared to if the UK had stayed within the EU, maintaining its estimation despite facing criticism from Brexit supporters as being overly pessimistic; the OBR noted that growth in UK goods trade is well below other advanced economies and 10% down on 2019 levels at the end of 2023. The National Institute of Economic and Social Research estimated that the negative impact of Brexit gradually escalates, reaching some 5-6 per cent of GDP or about £2,300 per capita by 2035. Trade Journalist Alan Beattie states that the 5 per cent of GDP long-run cost of leaving the EU single market and customs union is not compensated by trade agreements such as CPTPP, regardless of who joins it in the future, pointing out that the long run collective gain of CPTPP, the Australia, and New Zealand deals are worth just 0.2 per cent to UK GDP. Beattie argues that CPTPP, and any future trade agreement, that create obstacles to realigning with the European single market are harmful to the economy of the United Kingdom in the long term.

Environmental campaigners criticised the UK government for agreeing to eliminate all import tariffs on palm oil from Malaysia, a product blamed for widespread deforestation, prompting outrage from green campaigners. The British government's decision violates the United Kingdom's COP27 pledge to end deforestation by 2030, which it had committed to less than a year prior in Glasgow.

Further concerns were raised by trade unions over clauses in the deal that will allow large companies to sue the UK government behind closed doors if they believe their profits have suffered from changes to laws or regulations. The TUC's general secretary, Paul Nowak, noted that these clauses could allow large companies to sue on grounds such as an increase in the minimum wage or bringing energy companies back into public ownership.

In March 2023, British Secretary of State for Business and Trade Kemi Badenoch argued Britain's decision to join the CPTPP gives it a strengthened presence and influence in the Asia-Pacific region which is rapidly growing in significance both economically and politically. Additionally, Badenoch also claimed the deal is the most significant commercial agreement signed by the UK since Brexit, with a potential to grow in importance as the rise of Pacific Rim countries continues, with applications from China and Taiwan highlighting further market opportunities that Britain could gain access to through CPTPP.

== Member state relations ==
- Australia
- Brunei
- Canada
- Chile
- Japan
- Malaysia
- Mexico
- New Zealand
- Peru
- Singapore
- Vietnam

== See also ==
- Comprehensive and Progressive Agreement for Trans-Pacific Partnership (CPTPP)
- Australia–United Kingdom Free Trade Agreement
- Canada–United Kingdom Free Trade Agreement
- Canada–United Kingdom Trade Continuity Agreement
- Economy of the United Kingdom
- Foreign relations of the United Kingdom
- Free trade agreements of Canada
- Free trade agreements of New Zealand
- Free trade agreements of the United Kingdom
- Mexico–United Kingdom Free Trade Agreement
- New Zealand–United Kingdom Free Trade Agreement
- United Kingdom–Crown Dependencies Customs Union
- UK–Japan Comprehensive Economic Partnership Agreement
- Accession of the United Kingdom to the European Communities
