= Conference of Parliamentary Committees for Union Affairs =

The Conference of Parliamentary Committees for Union Affairs of Parliaments of the European Union (COSAC) is a conference of Members of the European Parliament (MEPs) and national Members of Parliament (MPs) who are drawn from parliamentary committees responsible for European Union affairs.

== History and role ==
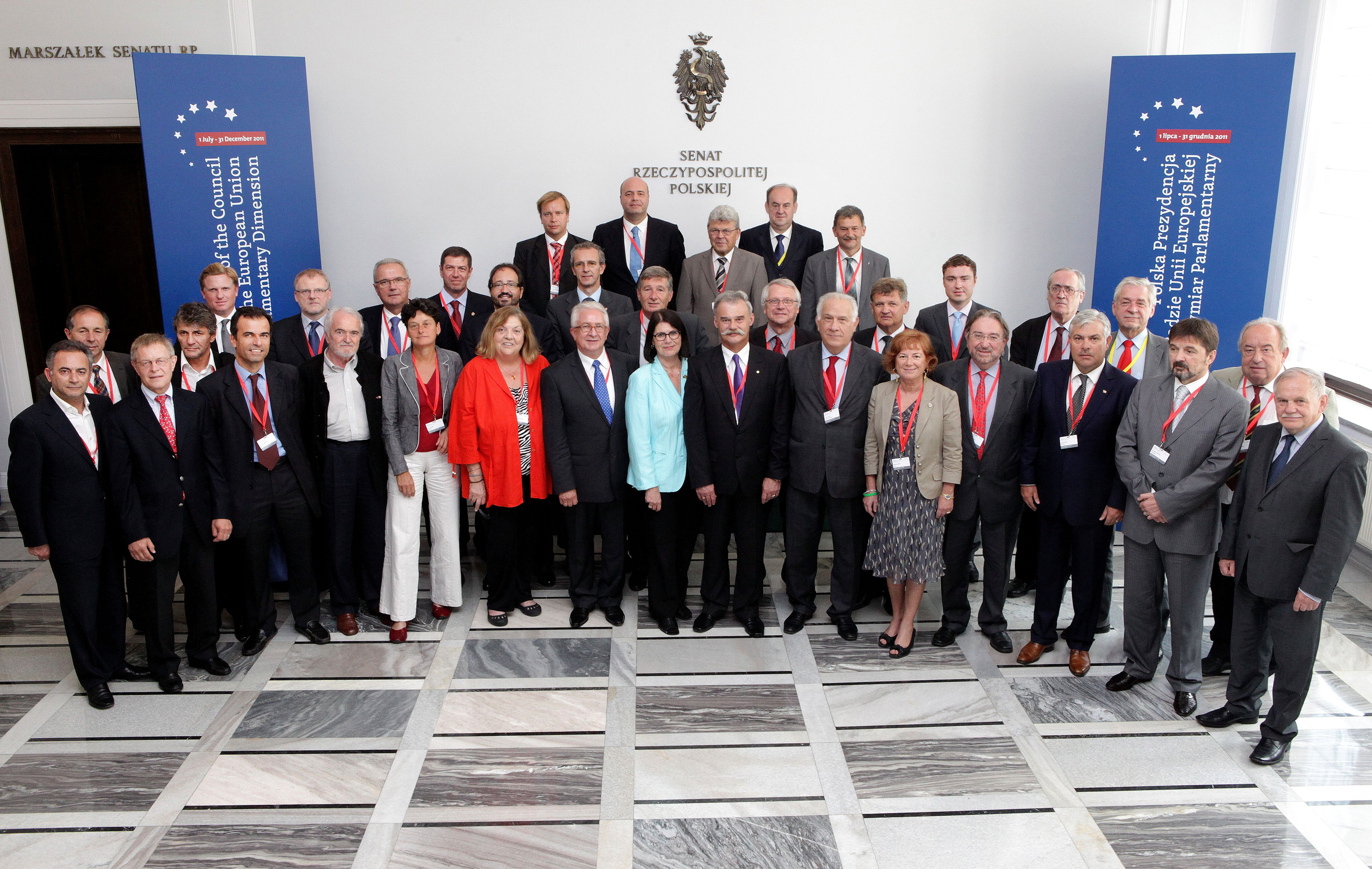
COSAC meeting in Warsaw in 2011

COSAC was founded in 1989 on a proposal of Laurent Fabius, then President of the French National Assembly and at the same time an MEP on the European Parliament Committee on Constitutional Affairs (AFCO). COSAC meets twice a year in the member state that holds the rotating Presidency of the Council of the European Union.

The conference is mainly intended for personal contacts between Members of National Parliaments and MEPs, and for exchanges of information. The conference is therefore interested in the means by which the parliaments are able to co-operate and communicate with each other via interparliamentary meetings, and through the IPEX scrutiny website. The 17 Biannual COSAC report from April 2012 focused on recent developments in parliamentary scrutiny and the parliaments' use of IPEX.

COSAC may also adopt contributions addressed to the EU institutions. COSAC has gained the right to submit contributions and examine proposals on EU law relating to Justice and Home Affairs and saw its role further expand under the Treaty of Lisbon with provisions for increased involvement of national parliaments in EU affairs.

Various committees from non-EU countries have also been invited to participate in the meetings as observers. For example, on 26 November 2023, the Standing Committee on European Integration representing Armenia participated in the COSAC meeting held in Madrid, Spain.

== Name ==
COSAC is a French acronym for the conference's former name "Conférence des organes spécialisés dans les affaires communautaires et européennes des parlements de l'Union européenne" (Conference of Community and European Affairs Committees of Parliaments of the European Union). It is known by similar terms such as the Conference of European Community Affairs Committees and under the Treaty of Lisbon COSAC's name is listed as the conference of Parliamentary Committees for Union Affairs.

== List of European affairs committees ==
State	Committee
Belgium	Advisory Committee on European Affairs and Federal Advisory Committee on European Affairs (includes MEPs)
Croatia	European Affairs Committee
Finland	Grand Committee
France	The Committee in Charge of European Affairs (lower house)
Germany	Committee on the Affairs of the European Union (lower house) and the Committee on European Union Questions (upper house) (also, the Chamber for European Affairs in the upper house)
Ireland	Joint Committee on European Union Affairs
Italy	Committee on European Union Policies (lower house) and Committee on European Union Policies (upper house)
Poland	European Union Affairs Committee (lower house) European Union Affairs Committee (upper house)
Portugal	European Affairs Committee
Romania	The Committee on European Affairs (lower house) and European Affairs Committee (upper house)
Slovakia	European Affairs Committee
Slovenia	Committee on European Union Affairs
Spain	Joint Commission for the European Union
Sweden	The Committee on EU Affairs
United Kingdom (former member state)	European Scrutiny Committee (lower house) and European Union Committee (upper house, includes sub-committees)

== See also ==
- European Assizes
- National parliaments of the European Union
- Joint parliamentary meeting on the Future of Europe
- List of acronyms: European sovereign-debt crisis
