= European Union Committee =

Select committee of the UK House of Lords

The European Union Committee was a select committee of the House of Lords in the Parliament of the United Kingdom. Its terms of reference were "to consider European Union documents and other matters relating to the European Union", as well as "to represent the House as appropriate in interparliamentary co-operation within the European Union".

Much of the detailed scrutiny work on EU documents was conducted by the sub-committees, each dealing with a separate policy area. The main committee oversaw the work of the sub-committees and approved their reports as well as scrutinised proposals which crossed subject areas, such as the Treaty of Lisbon and the multiannual financial framework. Beginning in 2020, the committee also focused on the implementation of the United Kingdom's withdrawal from the European Union.

The main select committee had nineteen members: the chairperson, the chairs of the sub-committees, and other peers who also sat on the sub-committees. Committee members represented the House of Lords at a number of different interparliamentary meetings, such as COSAC and joint committee meetings at the European Parliament. As part of their work representing the House in interparliamentary co-operation within the EU, the committees contributed to the IPEX database, which brought together information about national parliamentary scrutiny from all EU member states.

The European Union Committee was dissolved in March 2021. Most of its functions were allocated to the newly formed European Affairs Committee and the International Agreements Committee which had previously been one of the sub-committees.

== Scrutiny work ==
The UK Government deposits European documents, such as draft directives and communications from the European Commission, in parliament. These were then subjected to scrutiny by the EU Select Committee and its counterpart in the House of Commons, the European Scrutiny Committee. In the House of Lords system, each deposited document was sifted by subject area and importance for the Select Committee or one of the sub-committees to carefully scrutinise on an ongoing basis. The chairman of the Select Committee pursued any issues arising in correspondence with the responsible minister, and from time to time directly with the commission. This correspondence is publicly available.

== Sub-committees ==
Prior to the start of the 2012−13 Session, the Select Committee had seven sub-committees. At the start of the May 2012 parliamentary session, the Select Committee restructured its sub-committees, eliminating the previous Sub-committee G (Social Policies and Consumer Protection) and revising the remits of the remaining six sub-committees. Shortly after the United Kingdom's withdrawal agreement with the EU went into effect in January 2020, the sub-committees were further reduced to five, merging the previous six sub-committees into four, and adding an International Agreements sub-committee. The International Agreements sub-committee was re-established as the separate International Agreements Committee in January 2021.

The final sub-committees were as follows:

Environment

The EU Environment Sub-committee examined the European Union's policies regarding the environment as well as agriculture, energy, climate change, food, fisheries, biosecurity, and overall public health. In addition, it considered the environmental impact of the UK−EU level playing field.

Goods

The EU Goods Sub-committee considered the European Union's policies and legislative proposals, as well as ongoing negotiations between the United Kingdom and the European Union, regarding future trade in goods (including customs), level playing fields, consumer protections, public procurement and transport.

Security and Justice

The EU Security and Justice Sub-committee considered the United Kingdom's future relations with the EU regarding internal and external security, including criminal justice, policing, data-sharing, and defence.

Services

The EU Services Sub-committee considered policies related to the United Kingdom's relationship with the European Union in the areas of trading in financial and non-financial services, as well as science, education, and culture.
