= Joint parliamentary meeting on the Future of Europe =

The Joint parliamentary meeting on the Future of Europe was a meeting of parliamentarians from the European Parliament and from the national parliaments of the member states of the European Union on the topic of the future of the European Union. The first of these meetings occurred on 2006-05-08/2006-05-09; the second occurred on 2006-12-04/2006-12-05. The third took place in Brussels on 11 and 12 June 2007.

== See also ==
- Conference of Community and European Affairs Committees of Parliaments of the European Union
- European Assizes
- European Convention (disambiguation)
- List of national parliaments of the member states of the European Union
