= New Zealand–United Kingdom Free Trade Agreement =

Free trade agreement between New Zealand and the United Kingdom

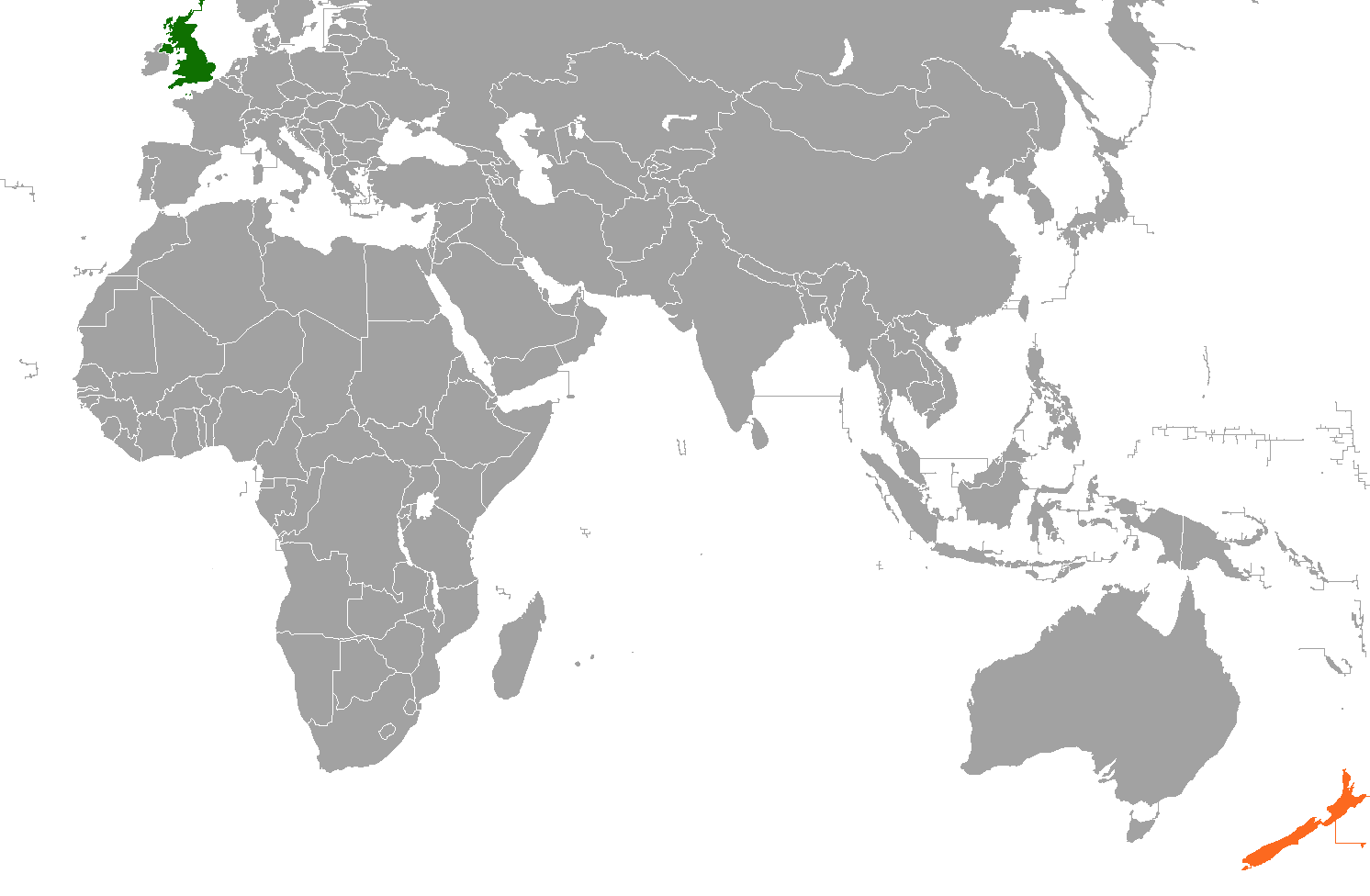
- New Zealand United Kingdom
- Type: Free Trade Agreement and Economic Integration Agreement
- Context: Trade agreement between New Zealand and the United Kingdom
- Drafted: 20 October 2021
- Signed: 28 February 2022
- Effective: 31 May 2023
- Condition: Ratification by both Houses of the Parliament of New Zealand and the UK
- Negotiators: (New Zealand) New Zealander Trade Minister: Damien O'Connor; (United Kingdom) British Trade Ministers: Liz Truss (until 15 September 2021); Anne-Marie Trevelyan (from 15 September 2021)
- Parties: New Zealand; United Kingdom
- Language: English

The New Zealand–United Kingdom free trade agreement (NZUKFTA) was signed on 28 February 2022. The broad terms of the agreement were concluded on 20 October 2021. It was the second trade agreement signed by Britain since leaving the European Union that was negotiated completely anew.

== Negotiations ==
NZUKFTA Round of Negotiations
Round	Dates	Location	Ref.
1	13–24 July 2020	Virtual meeting	
2	19 October–2 November 2020	Virtual meeting	
3	26 January–9 February 2021	Virtual meeting	
4	12–27 April 2021	Virtual meeting	
5	8–16 June 2021	Virtual meeting	
6	19–30 July 2021	Virtual meeting	

On 21 October 2021, New Zealand and United Kingdom signed a free trade agreement eliminating tariffs on 97% of New Zealand exports to the UK including honey, wine, kiwifruit, onions, and most industrial products. In addition, a range of dairy and beef exports will be tariff free after a period of 15 years. On 1 March 2022, the two countries ratified the terms of the free trade agreement signed in October. This agreement removes tariffs on 99.5% of New Zealand exports including meat, butter and cheese. New Zealand Prime Minister Jacinda Ardern described the free trade agreement as a "gold-standard free trade agreement" that would help accelerate the country's economic recovery. This free trade agreement came into force on 31 May 2023.

== Areas covered in the New Zealand-United Kingdom Free Trade Agreement ==
The New Zealand-United Kingdom Free Trade Agreement (NZUKFTA) is a comprehensive bilateral trade agreement comprising 33 chapters covering trade in goods, services, investment, digital trade, intellectual property, environment, and inclusive trade.

=== Trade in goods and agriculture ===
- Tariff elimination: When the agreement took effect on 31 May 2023, New Zealand immediately lifted tariffs on all UK goods exports. This ended duties on products including vehicles, clothing, footwear, and machinery, saving UK exporters an estimated £17 million annually. In return, the UK instantly removed tariffs on 97% of New Zealand product lines.
- Transitional quotas and agricultural safeguards: Tariffs on sensitive UK agri-food products are being phased out gradually over up to 15 years using Tariff Rate Quotas and product-specific safeguards. For beef, a ten-year duty-free quota is followed by a five-year safeguard that reintroduces tariffs up to 20% if import volumes exceed set thresholds. Sheepmeat imports receive a 15-year duty-free quota, which New Zealand can only access after filling 90% of its existing World Trade Organization allocation. Dairy and fruit access is managed through separate five-year quotas for butter and cheese alongside a three-year seasonal quota for apples. Additionally, a general bilateral safeguard lets either nation temporarily reinstate tariffs if increased imports cause serious injury to domestic industries.
- Sanitary and phytosanitary standards:The agreement's sanitary and phytosanitary chapter focuses primarily on plants, plant products, and processed plant foods, leaving existing bilateral sanitary arrangements for animal products intact.The agreement preserves existing UK statutory protection levels for food safety, animal welfare, and human, animal, and plant health. As a result, established UK standards remain unchanged, including bans on hormone-treated beef and statutory maximum residue limits for pesticides.

=== Trade in services and professional qualifications ===
- Professional qualifications: The agreement establishes dedicated frameworks and regulatory dialogues to streamline trade across several professional service sectors. An annex on professional services enables regulatory authorities in both nations to negotiate mutual recognition routes for professional qualifications.
- Legal services: For legal services, the deal guarantees that UK lawyers can practice foreign and international law including arbitration, mediation, and conciliation in New Zealand using their existing home titles, backed by a dedicated Legal Services Regulatory Dialogue.
- Architectural services: Like for legal services, parallel dialogue is established for architects, which includes evaluating sustainability skills during qualification recognition.
- Financial and maritime services: In financial and maritime services, the agreement enforces non-discrimination rules for financial services, asset management, and cross-border financial data flows, while securing legal certainty for British-flagged vessels operating in New Zealand.

=== Business mobility and investment ===
- Business mobility: To facilitate commercial travel and cross-border capital, the agreement introduces visa routes permitting professionals, such as lawyers and accountants, to fulfill client contracts in New Zealand without facing economic needs tests or quantitative caps. Intra-company transferees including executives, managers, and specialists are granted three-year visas alongside permission for accompanying family members, while both nations also committed to expanding the Youth Mobility and Working Holiday schemes.
- Investment provisions: The agreement raises the screening threshold for British investments into New Zealand to NZ$200 million. It bans explicit performance conditions, such as mandatory local hiring, headquarters localisation, export restrictions, or mandated research and development spending. The provisions also incorporate Most-Favoured-Nation treatment, restrict director nationality and residency requirements, and explicitly exclude Investor-State Dispute Settlement mechanisms.

=== Digital trade and e-commerce ===
- Under the agreement's digital trade and e-commerce provisions, both nations prohibit customs duties on electronic transmissions, including software downloads.
- The deal also guarantees the uninterrupted free flow of cross-border data while banning unjustified data localisation requirements.

=== Intellectual property and geographical indications ===
- Copyright extension: New Zealand committed to extending its copyright and performance rights protection terms by 20 years to match UK standards, with implementation required within 15 years of the agreement taking effect.
- Artist's Resale Right: The agreement also established a mutual Artist's Resale Right scheme granting visual artists royalties whenever their works are resold through commercial art markets, which came into force on 1 December 2024.
- Trademarks and Geographical Indications: To strengthen trademark protection and enforcement, the deal incorporates online registration systems and permits administrative website-blocking orders against online infringement. A Geographical Indications (GIs) review clause was triggered following New Zealand's trade deal with the European Union, initiating negotiations on a new GI subchapter to protect iconic products such as Blue Stilton cheese and English wine.

=== Environment and climate change ===
- Paris Agreement reaffirmation: The agreement includes a dedicated environment chapter that reaffirms both nations' commitments under the Paris Agreement, including pursuing efforts to limit global temperature increases to 1.5 °C above pre-industrial levels and achieving net zero emissions by 2050.
- Tariff liberalization: To support these environmental goals, the agreemement liberalizes tariffs on an extensive range of green goods, such as electric vehicles and wind turbine components.
- Coal and subsidy phase-out: The agreement contains binding commitments to phase out electricity generated from unabated coal and eliminate harmful fossil fuel subsidies.

=== Governance and inclusive trade ===
- Implementation oversight mechanisms: To oversee ongoing implementation and maintain regulatory alignment, the agreement establishes a Ministerial Joint Committee alongside 15 specialised policy committees and working groups, covering areas such as Trade in Goods, Rules of Origin, Wine and Distilled Spirits, and Professional Business Services.
- Inclusive trade participation: The deal agreement an Inclusive Trade Committee dedicated to expanding trade participation for Māori, women-led businesses, and small and medium-sized enterprises (SMEs), which led to the establishment of a joint UK-NZ Trade and Gender Workplan.

== Impact ==
After 12 months of the FTA entering into effect, Trade Minister Todd McClay announced that the United Kingdom became New Zealand's fastest growing export market.

The NZ-UK trade agreement has been compared in detail with the agreement between NZ and the EU; the difference in outcomes was found to be unfavourable to the UK, and described as stark.

=== Macroeconomic impact and bilateral trade growth ===
Prior to implementation, government modeling projected that the agreement would have a minor overall effect on the UK economy, estimating a long-run GDP increase of 0.03% (or £800 million) by 2035. Long-term projections indicated that UK exports to New Zealand would rise by £700 million, while imports from New Zealand were expected to grow by £1 billion. This modest baseline reflected historically low bilateral trade volumes and already minimal pre-existing tariff barriers.

Following the agreement's entry into force on 31 May 2023, two-year trade monitoring by the Department for Business and Trade (DBT) evaluated initial commercial flows. In the 12 months to June 2025, total bilateral trade grew by 19.7% (£638 million) compared to the year preceding the deal, reaching £3.9 billion. Over the same period, overall, UK trade worldwide grew by 0.02%. Consequently, New Zealand moved from the UK's 57th to 56th largest trading partner, representing 0.2% of total UK trade. However, when measured against the 2018 pre-COVID baseline, bilateral trade growth (+24.5%) lagged overall UK global trade growth (+31.7%), indicating that post-implementation trade expansion partly reflected broader post-COVID economic recovery.

=== Trade in services ===
Bilateral trade expansion following the agreement's entry into force was primarily driven by services. In the 12 months to June 2025, UK service exports to New Zealand grew by 42.7% (£431 million) over the pre-agreement baseline to reach £1.4 billion, compared to the 15.0% growth rate of UK service exports globally. This growth was led by other business services (+200.0%, up £282 million to £423 million), travel services (+34.0%, up £115 million), and insurance and pension services (+11.4%, up £21 million). Within the business services sector, key subsector gains included accounting, auditing, and tax consulting (rising from £4 million to £116 million), business and management consulting (increasing from £19 million to £104 million), and trade-related services (growing from £6 million to £73 million).

Over the same period, UK service imports from New Zealand increased by 118.8% (£372 million), led by travel services (+118.4%, +£161 million), other business services (+152.4%, +£128 million), and intellectual property services (+528.6%, +£37 million). In baseline government impact modeling, the UK sectors projected to realize the largest absolute output gains were wholesale and retail trade (+£105 million), public services (+£82 million), and other services (+£82 million).

=== Trade in goods and tariff preference use ===
Compared to services, UK goods exports to New Zealand (excluding unspecified goods) declined by 29.2% (£336 million) in the 12 months to June 2025 compared to the year preceding entry into force, remaining 13.6% below 2018 levels. Major export sector drops included machinery and transport equipment (-35.7%, -£275 million), miscellaneous manufactures (-27.2%, -£35 million), and material manufactures (-21.1%, -£12 million).

By mid-2025, the UK accounted for 2.5% of total goods imports into New Zealand. In contrast, UK goods imports from New Zealand grew by 23.4% (£173 million) post-entry into force, driven primarily by food and live animals (+87.1%, +£204 million), while New Zealand maintained a 0.2% share of total UK goods imports.

Tariff preferences were widely used across both import and export streams following implementation. New Zealand eliminated tariffs on 100% of UK goods exports immediately upon entry into force, generating an estimated £17 million in annual tariff savings for UK exporters.

Between entry into force and December 2024, 80.7% of preference-eligible UK exports to New Zealand used preferential tariffs (£164.2 million in eligible trade), delivering an estimated £9.3 million in duty savings. Over the same period, 82.6% of eligible UK imports from New Zealand entered under preferential rates (£588 million in trade), resulting to £67 million in duty savings. In total, 90.1% of imports from New Zealand entered the UK duty-free, comprising 45.6% via Most-Favoured-Nation terms and 44.5% via preferential Free Trade Agreement rates.

=== Agricultural sector impact and stakeholder reactions ===
Initial government impact assessments projected a £48 million output decline in UK agriculture, forestry, and fishing, along with a £97 million decrease in semi-processed food output due to heightened import competition. Post-implementation monitoring highlighted varied import dynamics across commodity lines. Imports of New Zealand sheepmeat rose from 26,800 to 40,900 metric tonnes in the 12 months to May 2025, accounting for 57.2% of total UK sheepmeat imports. However, New Zealand used only 47.6% of its existing World Trade Organization sheepmeat quota in 2024 and 41.9% in 2025, remaining under the 90% fill rate necessary to trigger the agreements 15-year transitional Tariff Rate Quota (TRQ). Over the same timeframe, imports of New Zealand beef grew from 1,000 to 5,300 metric tonnes, increasing its share of total UK beef imports from 0.4% to 1.8%. Total UK beef imports grew only marginally (+3.4%), indicating that expanded shipments from New Zealand and Australia largely substituted for imports from EU suppliers such as the Netherlands and Germany. New Zealand filled 24.2% of its FTA beef quota in 2024 and 82.4% in 2025. Among other products, apple TRQ fill rates reached 57.2% in 2023, 64.1% in 2024, and 47.4% in 2025, while butter TRQ fill reached 57.6% in 2025.

Agricultural stakeholders offered differing assessments of the agreement's terms. Domestic producer organizations, such as the National Farmers' Union (NFU), expressed concern over structural cost differences noting that production costs in New Zealand were 63% lower for lamb and 25% lower for milk and warned that unmitigated market access could undercut UK farmers. Dairy UK described the agreement as a blow to UK processors, while the National Sheep Association cited risks of market disruption during periods of global instability. In contrast, New Zealand trade groups including Beef + Lamb New Zealand and the Meat Industry Association (MIA) supported the deal, arguing that pasture-raised production seasons in New Zealand complemented UK domestic supply and that production capacity constraints prevented market flooding. In the alcoholic drinks industry, the Wine and Spirits Trade Association viewed the agreement favorably, highlighting that the removal of New Zealand's 5% tariff on gin created opportunities for UK distillers, while UK tariff reductions saved consumers an estimated £6 million on New Zealand wine.

=== Regional and small business distribution ===
The regional impact of goods trade varied across the United Kingdom following implementation. Post-implementation growth in goods exports to New Zealand was confined to Wales (+78.1%, +£16 million). All other UK regions recorded declines in goods exports, with the largest percentage drops occurring in the North East England (-74.4%, -£38 million), Northern Ireland (-44.7%, -£13 million), the East of England (-42.1%, -£42 million), and the North West (-41.3%, -£44 million). In comparison, import growth from New Zealand was highest in Northern Ireland (+551.1%, +£38 million), the North West (+87.8%, +£43 million), and the East of England (+80.2%, +£81 million). Government modeling by the Department for International Trade projected a small drop in economic output for Northern Ireland under certain trade protocol assumptions. Regarding devolved administrations, the Scottish Government and Welsh Government welcomed the deal's service and mobility provisions while expressing concern over potential risks to local livestock farming communities.

Small and medium-sized businesses saw mixed results after the agreement took effect. Between 2022 and 2024, the number of VAT-registered UK businesses exporting goods to New Zealand fell by 9.5% (from 6,949 to 6,292), reflecting broader declines in overall UK global trade participation. This decrease occurred mainly among firms with fewer than 250 employees. Over the same period, the number of UK businesses importing goods from New Zealand grew by 5.4%. Feedback indicated that while small businesses benefited from tariff elimination, some encountered administrative hurdles navigating Rules of Origin procedures.

=== Environmental, animal welfare, and statutory standards ===
The agreement's environment chapter reaffirmed both nations' commitments to the Paris Agreement, including goals to limit global temperature increases to 1.5 °C and reach net zero emissions by 2050. Government modeling estimated that while UK domestic production emissions would remain unaffected, transport-related carbon emissions from bilateral trade would increase by approximately 50% (an additional 0.13 to 0.14 MtCO2e) due to increased transit volumes. Independent evaluations by the Trade and Agriculture Commission (TAC) and the UK government's Section 42 report confirmed that the agreement maintained existing statutory levels of protection for human, animal, and plant health, animal welfare, and environmental standards.

Existing legal prohibitions such as bans on hormone-treated beef and statutory limits on pesticide residues remained fully intact. However, advocacy organizations including the RSPCA and Sustain criticized the agreement for failing to condition tariff reductions on adherence to specific animal welfare or environmental production standards.

== See also ==
- Accession of the United Kingdom to CPTPP
- Comprehensive and Progressive Agreement for Trans-Pacific Partnership
- Free trade agreements of New Zealand
- Free trade agreements of the United Kingdom
- Foreign relations of New Zealand
- Foreign relations of the United Kingdom
- New Zealand–United Kingdom relations
