= European Assizes =

Political assembly

The European Assizes was a one-time assembly of the European Parliament and the national parliaments of the member states of the European Union in Rome in 1990. It took place just before the governments of the Member States embarked on the negotiations that resulted in the Treaty of Maastricht. It was therefore the first time in history that the parliaments, which would eventually have to ratify a treaty, met in advance of the negotiations to discuss what should go into that treaty.

Under the theme of "The future of the Community; the implications, for the Community and the Member States, of the proposals concerning Economic and Monetary Union and Political Union and, more particularly, the role of the national parliaments and of the European Parliament", it led to two declarations, the first about the content of the future treaty, the second about the desirability of involving national parliaments more in the affairs of the European Union. There were 258 participants: 173 from the national parliaments and 85 from the European Parliament.

Although no new assemblies of this kind were held again, a standing body for cooperation between the parliaments concerned was established, the Conference of Community and European Affairs Committees of Parliaments of the European Union (COSAC).

== See also ==
- European Convention (disambiguation)
- Joint parliamentary meeting on the Future of Europe
- List of national parliaments of the member states of the European Union
