= Chile–United Kingdom relations =

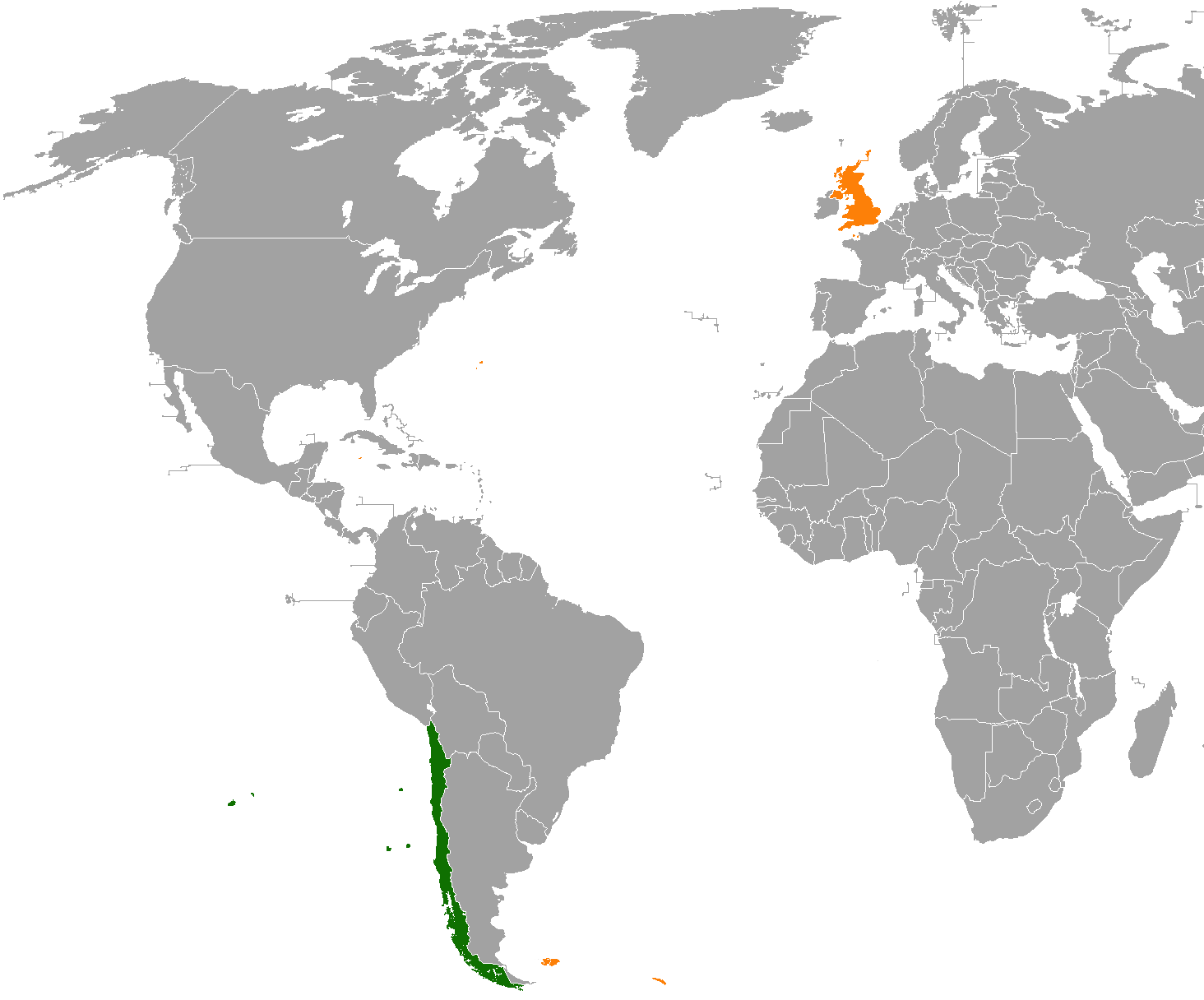

- Chile: United Kingdom

Diplomatic mission
- Embassy of Chile, London: Embassy of the United Kingdom, Santiago

Envoy
- Ambassador Diego Paulsen: Ambassador Louise De Sousa

Chile–United Kingdom relations are bilateral relations between the United Kingdom and Chile. Both countries established diplomatic relations on 14 September 1823. The two countries maintain strong cultural ties as Chilean culture was somewhat anglicised after independence, seeing many mutual investments since. Standard visits, on terms each country applies, allow visitors and short-term study, without need for a travel visa endorsed in a passport.

Both countries share common membership of CPTPP, the International Criminal Court, OECD, the United Nations, and the World Trade Organization. Bilaterally the two countries have an Association Agreement, and a Double Taxation Convention.

== Country comparison ==
Common name	Chile	United Kingdom
Official name	Republic of Chile	United Kingdom of Great Britain and Northern Ireland
Coat of arms		United Kingdom
Flag	Chile	United Kingdom
Area	756,950 km^{2} (292,260 sq mi)	242,495 km^{2} (93,628 sq mi)
Population (est. 2023)	19,533,769	68,795,198
Capital	Santiago	London
Largest metropolitan area	Santiago – 1,947.2 km2 (15,403.2 km2 metro)	London – 1,485 km2 (13,709,000 km2 metro)
Government	Unitary presidential republic	Unitary parliamentary constitutional monarchy
First leader	Mateo de Toro y Zambrano	Robert Walpole
Current leader	José Antonio Kast	Andy Burnham
Established	12 February 1818 (declaration of independence)	1922
Official languages	Chilean Spanish	British English
Currency	Chilean peso	Pound sterling

== History ==
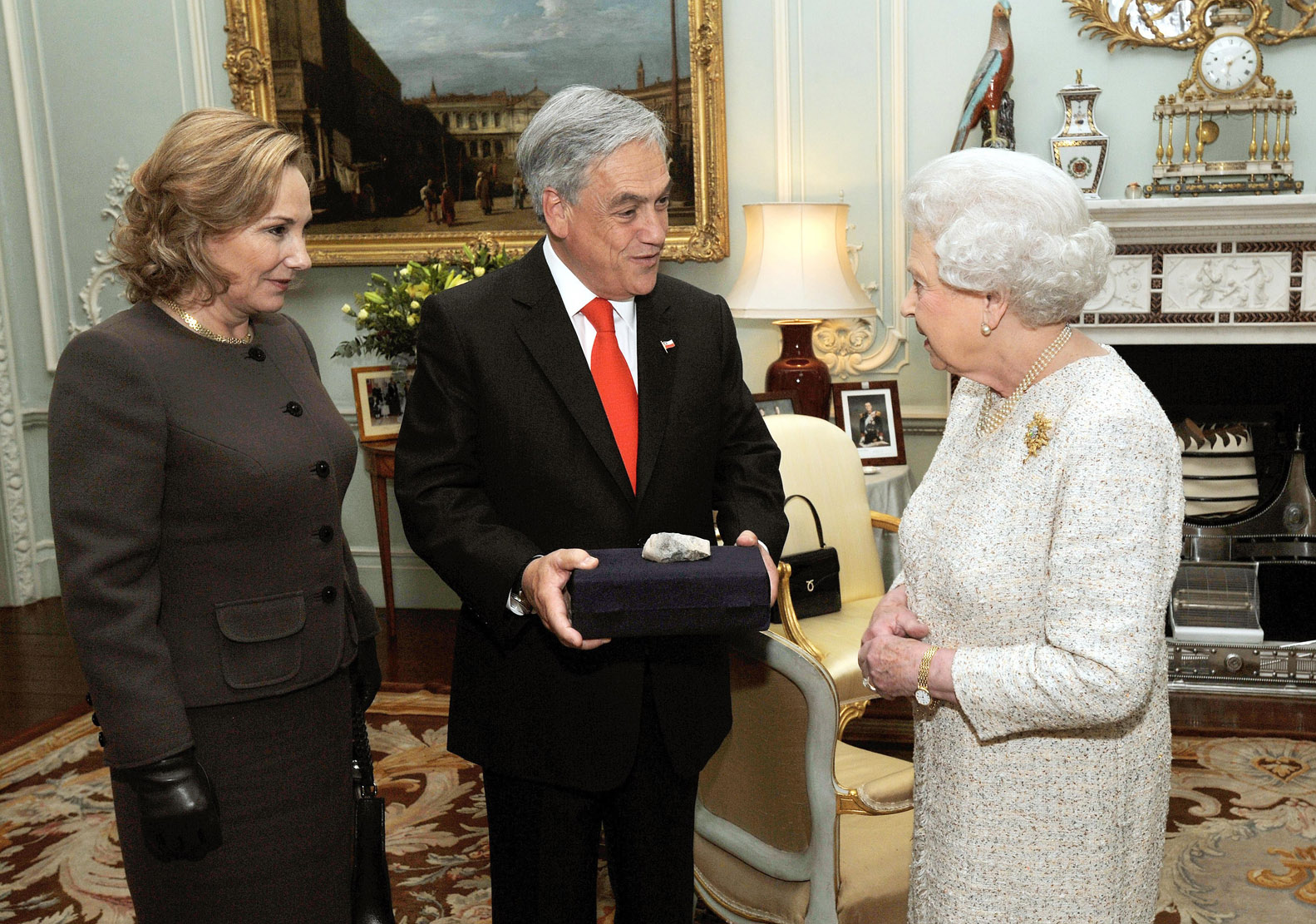
Chilean President Sebastián Piñera and his wife meeting Queen Elizabeth II at Buckingham Palace in 2010

England played an important role in Chile's history. According to William Edmundson's A History of the British Presence in Chile, 2009, Chile had the same head of state as England in the 16th century, Queen Mary I. When she married Philip II, he was still a prince, so the King of Spain, Carlos V, Holy Roman Emperor made him and Mary the King and Queen of Chile, as well as of England, Ireland, Naples and Jerusalem. Mary became such from her marriage in 1554 to her husband's coronation as King of Spain in 1556, when Chile became part of the possessions of the Spanish. Although there is no record or evidence to support the claim that Phillip was made 'King of Chile', it still remains as known anecdote in the country.

Throughout the Chilean colonial period, British naval vessels in times of war, occasional privateers – and in times of peace British and colonial pirates, outlaws, at risk of execution by neutral parties – harassed the wealthy Spanish authorities in Chile by plundering their ships. In times of peace private trade ships from both empires brought mutually needed goods. British forces and the Mapuche both allied themselves to depose the Spanish hold in the country. Britain assisted the Chileans' fight for independence in the 1810s, led by Lord Cochrane. The British Admiral Lord Cochrane was the Chilean Navy's first commander who fought in the Chilean War of Independence and five Chilean Navy ships have been named in his honour.

In the early 1910s, Britain sold a super-dreadnought battleship Almirante Latorre to Chile. Although retained by the Royal Navy through the war, the ship was delivered after it and served as the Chilean Navy's flagship for many decades thereafter. In the modern era Chilean Navy and the Royal Navy maintain a close relationship with one ex-British Type 22 and three Type 23 frigates in Chilean service.

During the Falklands War in 1982, with the still pending Beagle conflict, Chile and Colombia became the only Latin American countries to abstain from voting in the TIAR (as did the United States and Trinidad and Tobago). Chile provided the UK with limited, but significant information. The Chilean position is described in detail by Sir Lawrence Freedman in his book The Official History of the Falklands Campaign.

== Economic relations ==
From 1 February 2003 until 30 December 2020, trade between Chile and the UK was governed by the Chile–European Union Association Agreement, while the United Kingdom was a member of the European Union.

Following the withdrawal of the United Kingdom from the European Union, the UK and Chile signed the Chile–United Kingdom Association Agreement on 30 January 2019. The Chile–United Kingdom Association Agreement is a continuity trade agreement, based on the EU free trade agreement, which entered into force on 1 January 2021. Chile was the first country which signed a free trade agreement with the United Kingdom post-Brexit. Trade value between Chile and the United Kingdom was worth £1,881 million in 2022.

In July 2023, the United Kingdom has signed the agreement to accede to the Comprehensive and Progressive Agreement for Trans-Pacific Partnership, a trade bloc of which Chile is a founding member. Trade between Chile and the United Kingdom entered into force on 16 December 2024.

== Resident diplomatic missions ==
- Chile maintains an embassy in London.
- The United Kingdom is accredited to Chile through its embassy in Santiago.
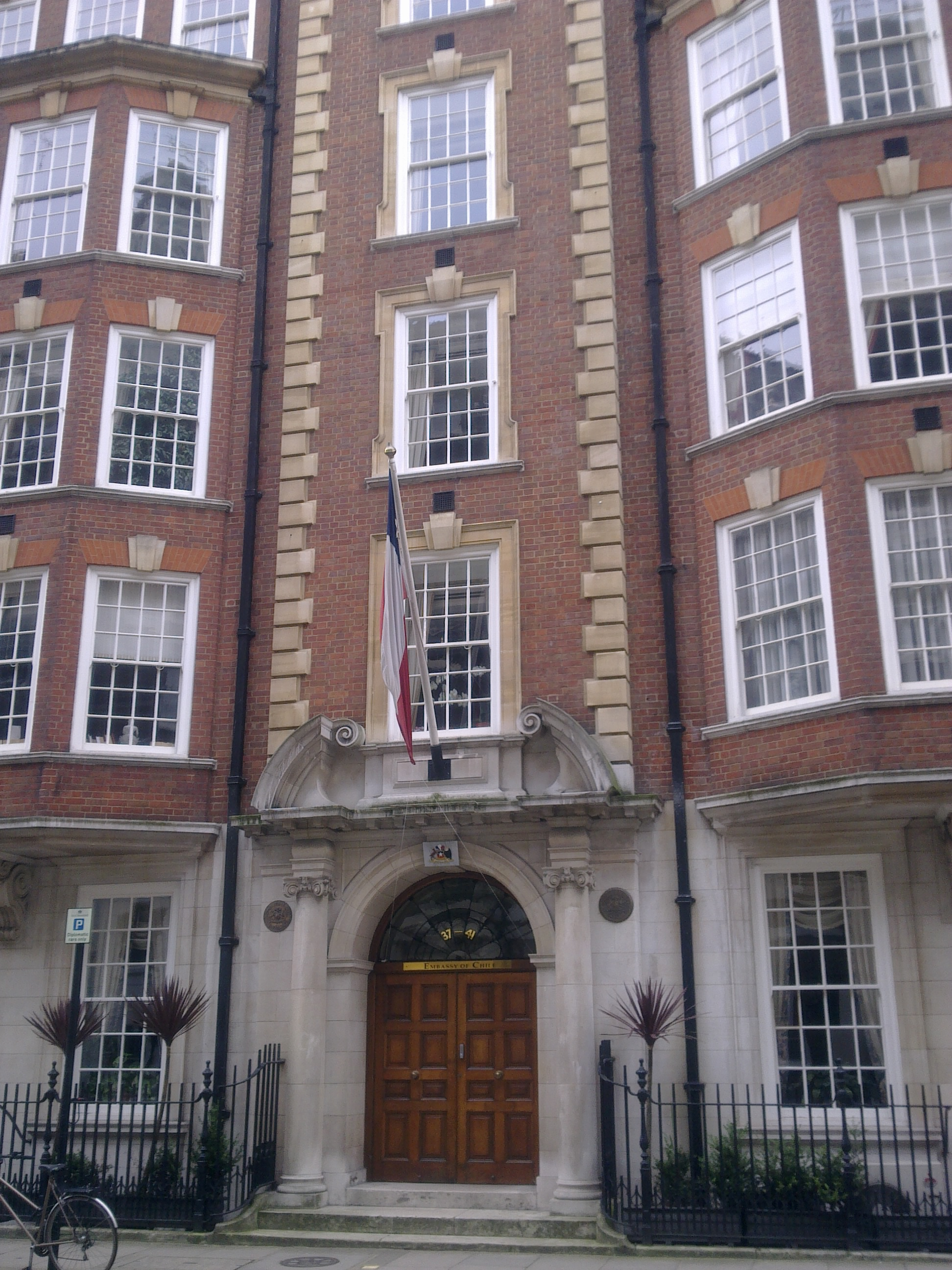
Embassy of Chile in London

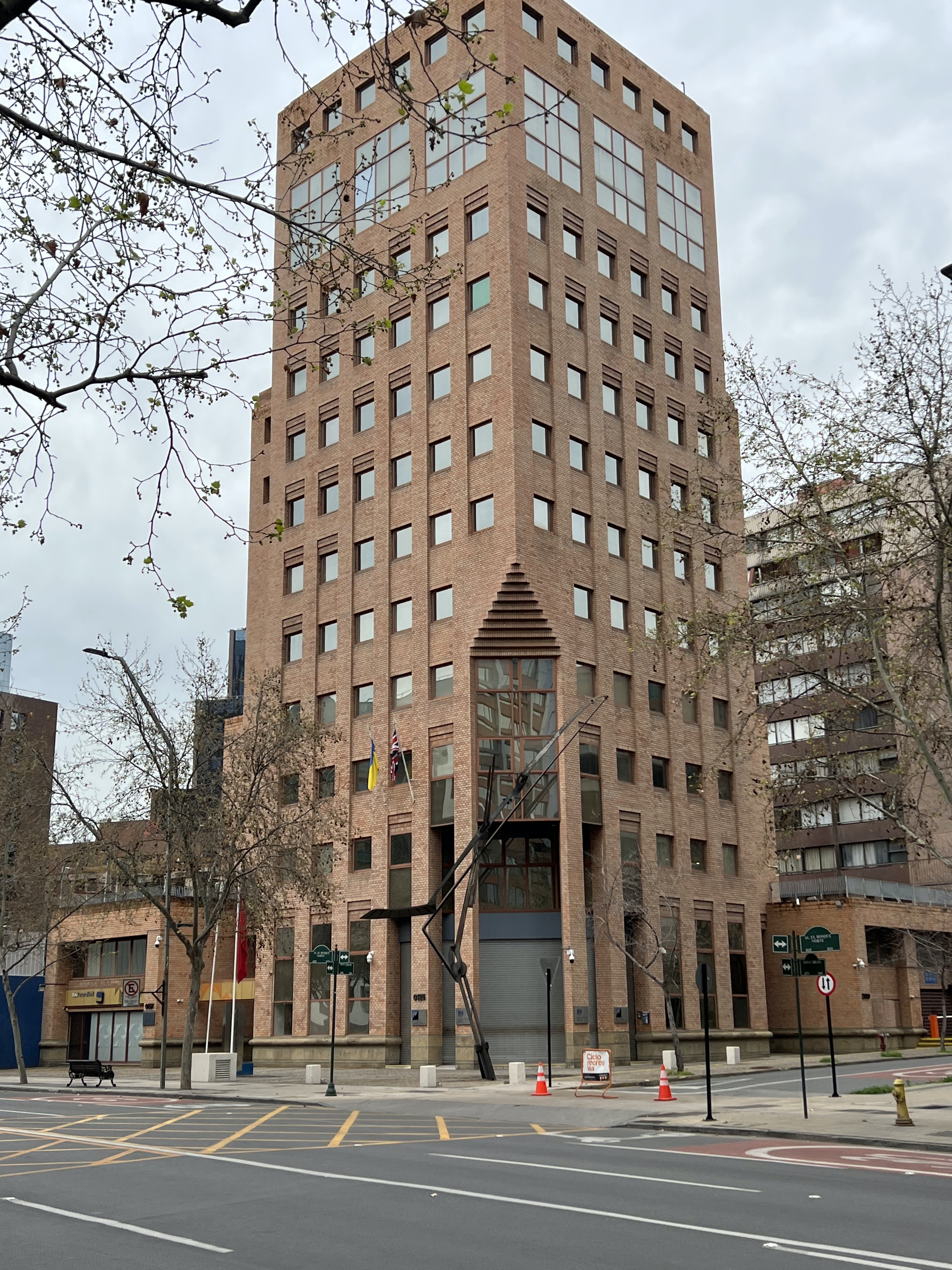
Embassy of the United Kingdom in Santiago

== See also ==
- Accession of the United Kingdom to CPTPP
- British Chilean
- Chileans in the United Kingdom
- Foreign relations of Chile
- Foreign relations of the United Kingdom
