= United Kingdom–United States Free Trade Agreement =

British-American tariff lowering law

UK-US FTA
United Kingdom–United States Free Trade Agreement
- United Kingdom (UK) United States (US)
- Type: Free trade agreement
- Context: Investment and Trade agreement between the United Kingdom and the United States
- Negotiators: (United Kingdom) British Trade Ministers: Liz Truss (until 15 September 2021); Anne-Marie Trevelyan (until 6 September 2022); Kemi Badenoch (until 5 July 2024); Jonathan Reynolds (until 5 September 2025); Peter Kyle (until 20 July 2026); Jonathan Reynolds (from 20 July 2026); (United States) American Trade Representatives: Bob Lighthizer (until 20 January 2021); María Pagán (until 18 March 2021); Katherine Tai (until 20 January 2025); Juan Millán (until 27 February 2025); Jamieson Greer (from 27 February 2025)
- Parties: United Kingdom; United States
- Language: English

The United Kingdom–United States Free Trade Agreement (UKUSFTA) is a proposed free trade agreement between the United Kingdom and the United States.

The UK became legally able to independently negotiate trade agreements when it left the European Union from 1 January 2020 due to a transition period which lasted until the UK formally exited the EU. Negotiations opened in May 2020, but have stagnated since 2021 under the Biden administration, which focused on fixing its domestic economy, though some hope has been recovered during the second Trump administration.

== History ==
UKUSFTA Round of Negotiations
Round	Dates	Location	Ref.
1	5–15 May 2020	Virtual meeting	
2	15–26 June 2020	Virtual meeting	
3	27 July–7 August 2020	Virtual meeting	
4	8–18 September 2020	Virtual meeting	
5	19–30 October 2020	Virtual meeting	

=== First Trump Administration ===
On 28 February 2020, the United States released its negotiating objectives. The United Kingdom released its objectives on 1 March. The United Kingdom and the United States began negotiations on 5 May 2020, and have had four rounds of negotiations as of September 2020.

In December 2020, the two countries signed an agreement on various goods, continuing trading terms from previous European Union–United States agreements.

=== Biden Administration ===
The Biden Administration made it clear that the US would not further talks about a potential FTA, due to British threats against ratifying the Northern Ireland Protocol which would violate international law, with dangerous ramifications that could threaten the Good Friday Agreement. With the administration of President Joe Biden uninterested in further negotiations, the United Kingdom began negotiating economic agreements with individual U.S. states. Regulation of international trade is a federal responsibility under the Commerce Clause of the U.S. Constitution, preventing state agreements from changing customs rules. Therefore, the UK has aimed at signing Memorandum of Understanding (MoU) agreements with numerous states. MoUs aim to remove market access barriers and increase trade and investment opportunities for UK and US companies. Former British trade minister Penny Mordaunt claimed that US state-level deals would pave the way for a full UK-US FTA.

UK–US State Memorandum of Understanding Agreements
No.	Signed	State	Ref.
1	27 May 2022	Indiana	
2	20 July 2022	North Carolina	
3	7 December 2022	South Carolina	
4	18 April 2023	Oklahoma	
5	22 June 2023	Utah	
6	25 September 2023	Washington	
7	14 November 2023	Florida	
8	13 March 2024	Texas	

During the Premiership of Rishi Sunak, the UK had been negotiating MoUs with California, Colorado, Illinois, and New York - though the negotiations were never concluded.

Following President Joe Biden and UK Prime Minister Rishi Sunak's meeting held in Northern Ireland on 12 April 2023, talks of a UK–US free trade agreement were postponed until at the very least 2025.

In June 2023, Biden and Sunak announced the 'Atlantic Declaration' to strengthen economic ties between the UK and the US. The agreement included a limited trade pact covering critical minerals needed for EV batteries, a new data protection deal, and easing other trade barriers. The declaration commits both nations to increase research collaboration in future technologies, such as AI, future 5G and 6G telecoms, quantum, semiconductors and engineering biology. Further, these talks led to a commitment in principle to a new UK–US Data Bridge that facilitates the transfer of data by UK businesses to certified U.S. organizations.

During the signing of the accession of the United Kingdom to CPTPP on 16 July 2023, Kemi Badenoch blamed the lack of progress on the UK-US FTA on the change of administration from Donald Trump to Joe Biden after the 2020 election. Badenoch stated that "The US is not carrying out any free trade agreements with any country".

On 3 October 2023, Biden and Sunak were reported to be preparing a "foundational" trade agreement between the two countries which would be modelled off of the Indo-Pacific Economic Framework. However this agreement will not constitute as a free trade agreement under World Trade Organization rules as the proposals do not contain market access commitments. The proposed partnership aims to cover subjects such as digital trade, labour protections and agriculture. On the same day, Badenoch reiterated that there was "zero" chance of a free trade agreement under President Biden's administration, citing his attitude to such deals. On 18 December 2023, it was announced that all talks for the "foundational trade partnership" had been abandoned.

=== Second Trump Administration ===
On 27 February 2025, a bipartisan group of US lawmakers re-introduced a bill that authorised comprehensive trade talks with the UK, named The United Act. The broadly-constructed measure would allow for initiating talks on "tariff and nontariff barriers affecting any industry, product, or service sector".

On 8 May 2025, the UK and US announced an agreement in principle on an Economic Prosperity Deal, paving the way for renewed negotiations.

According to a POLITICO-Public First poll conducted in April 2025, the vast majority of American and British adults support their governments reaching an agreement, but less than a third of respondents in the UK and 44% of Americans said they believe President Donald Trump will stick to it.

== Chapters ==
Areas covered in the FTA and contention points:

- Trade in Goods
- Sanitary and Phytosanitary Measures (SPS):
- Customs and Trade Facilitation
- Rules of origin
- Technical Barriers to Trade (TBT)
- Good Regulatory Practices
- Transparency, Publication, and Administrative Measures
- Trade in Services, Including Telecommunications and Financial Services
- Digital Trade in Goods and Services and Cross-Border Data Flows
- Investment
- Intellectual Property
- Procedural Fairness for Pharmaceuticals and Medical Devices
- State-Owned and Controlled Enterprises (SOEs)
- State Subsidies
- Competition Policy
- Labour
- Environment
- Anti-corruption
- Trade Remedies
- Settlement
- General Provisions
- Currency

== See also ==
- List of bilateral agreements
- List of multilateral agreements
- Free trade agreements of the United Kingdom
- Free trade agreements of the United States
- United Kingdom–United States relations
