= Interparliamentary EU Information Exchange =

The Interparliamentary EU information exchange (IPEX), is a platform for the exchange of information between EU national parliaments as well as the European Parliament concerning issues related to the European Union, especially in light of the provisions of the Treaty of Lisbon. The Treaty of Lisbon explicitly sets out the role of the national parliaments in the "Protocol on the role of national Parliaments in the European Union" and in the "Protocol on the application of the principles of subsidiarity and proportionality".

== History and Role ==
IPEX came about as the result of a recommendation made by the Conference of the Speakers of the European Union Parliaments in Rome in 2000. In accordance with the Guidelines for interparliamentary cooperation, agreed in The Hague in 2004, the official launch of the website took place in June 2006 during the EU Speakers Conference in Copenhagen. The website was later redesigned, launching its new format in 2011.

IPEX aims to support: the Speakers Conference; the Conference of Parliamentary Committees for Union Affairs of Parliaments of the European Union (COSAC); meetings of the specialized committees of the national Parliaments and of the European Parliament; interparliamentary meetings; and the liaison offices of the national parliaments in Brussels. IPEX is thus one of the major pillars of interparliamentary communication on European affairs, drawing together information from each of the national parliaments across the EU.

IPEX is intended to enable the national parliaments of EU Member States to cooperate more closely and coordinate their approaches to European affairs, whilst also seeking to make interparliamentary cooperation on EU matters accessible to European citizens. In this context, IPEX offers multilingual navigation and publishes fundamental texts and opinions of the national parliaments in English, French and other EU languages.

IPEX receives contributions from all national Parliaments of the Member States of the European Union, the national parliaments of the candidate countries and from the European Parliament. In order to promote interparliamentary cooperation, IPEX is open to COSAC and the European Centre for Parliamentary Research and Documentation (ECPRD).

== Organisation of IPEX ==
According to the IPEX Guidelines, the IPEX Board is responsible for decisions concerning the development of IPEX. The Board is appointed on a yearly basis by the Secretaries General of the national Parliaments and the European Parliament on behalf of their Speakers.

IPEX is managed by the Central Support, the permanent IPEX information officer and a network of national IPEX Correspondents.

== Features of IPEX ==
IPEX features a database of national parliamentary scrutiny information, forums, and a news section. It is publicly accessible.

The website aims to provide the following:

- Overview of the state of affairs in the debate within the national parliaments and the European Parliament with regard to proposals for European legislation coming from the European institutions, especially from the European Commission
- Exchange of information on legislative proposals between the national parliaments and the European Parliament, with special regard to the principles of subsidiarity and proportionality
- Exchange of information about consultation documents coming from the European Commission as a part of the “Informal Political Dialogue” (formerly known as the “Barroso Initiative”)
- Calendar of interparliamentary cooperation
- Links to national Parliaments and to the European Parliament as well as to other websites of interparliamentary cooperation in the framework of the EU, offering, for example, information about institutional procedures in EU affairs

IPEX also hosts the EU Speakers Conference website.
