= National Sheep Association =

British trade association for sheep farming

- Abbreviation: NSA
- Formation: 1892
- Legal status: Non-profit organization
- Purpose: Sheep farming in the UK
- Location: The Sheep Centre, Malvern Wells, Worcestershire, WR13 6PH
- Region served: UK
- Members: UK sheep farmers
- Chief Executive: Phil Stocker
- Main organ: NSA Council and its Executive Board (Chairman - Dan Phipps, and President - Lord Inglewood)
- Website: NSA

The National Sheep Association (NSA) is the trade association in the UK for sheep farming.

The Association is funded by its membership of sheep farmers and its activities involve it in every aspect of the sheep industry.

== History ==
It was formed in 1892 as the National Sheep Breeders Association. In 1969 it changed to its present name. It was initially established to facilitate communication between progressive breeders and improve sheep breeding management as well as provide a unified voice for the sheep industry.

The association is a registered charity.

== Structure ==
It is situated near the Three Counties Crossroads of the B4208 and Hanley Road (B4209) near Hanley Swan, opposite Langdale Wood, specifically in the north-east corner of the Three Counties Showground. It receives no government funding.

=== Regions ===
- Central
- Marches (Welsh border area)
- Eastern
- South East
- South West
- Wales
- Northern
- NSA Scotland
- Northern Ireland

== Function ==
National Sheep Association (NSA) is an organisation that represents the views and interests of sheep producers throughout the UK.

The NSA is active in a wide range of areas affecting the sheep sector, including policies and environmentally. The National Sheep Association relies on membership subscriptions to fund its work providing a voice for the UK sheep sector. Every membership strengthens NSA’s mandate to speak on behalf of the industry and provides vital financial support. NSA splits the UK into 9 regions, and each host a Sheep Event every two years, while ram sales are held across the UK each year.

It publishes the trade journal every two months called Sheep Farmer. Sheep Farmer magazine is the only dedicated technical journal for sheep producers. Published six times a year, it is available exclusively to NSA members, as part of the package of membership benefits.

== See also ==
- NSA Scotland
- Agriculture and Horticulture Development Board (AHDB)
- Hybu Cig Cymru (HCC)
- Quality Meat Scotland (QMS)
- Livestock & Meat Commission (LMC)
- List of sheep breeds
- National Sheep Industry Improvement Center
