= International Agreements Committee =

Select committee of the UK House of Lords

The International Agreements Committee is a select committee of the House of Lords in the Parliament of the United Kingdom. Originally a sub-committee of the European Union Committee, the International Agreements Committee has a remit to examine all treaties presented before Parliament as per the Constitutional Reform and Governance Act 2010, as well as to consider negotiations with foreign states and international bodies.

The committee's functions are largely shaped by post-Brexit foreign relations of the United Kingdom.

== Chairs ==
Committee chairs include those listed below.

Name	Start	End	Party
The Lord Goldsmith	23 April 2020	18 October 2021	Labour
The Baroness Hayter of Kentish Town	18 October 2021	12 July 2023	Labour Co-op
The Lord Goldsmith	12 July 2023	27 January 2026	Labour
The Lord Johnson of Lainston	27 January 2026	present	Conservative

== Membership ==
As of September 2026, the membership of the committee is as follows:

Member	Party
Lord Johnson of Lainston(Chair)	Conservative
Lord Anderson of Swansea	Labour
Baroness Anelay of St Johns	Conservative
Baroness Bi	Labour
Lord Boateng	Labour
Baroness Bonham-Carter of Yarnbury	Liberal Democrat
Lord German	Liberal Democrat
Lord Hannay of Chiswick	Crossbench
Baroness Lawlor	Conservative
Lord McDonald of Salford	Crossbench
Lord Stevenson of Balmacara	Labour
Baroness Verma	Conservative
