= National Sheep Industry Improvement Center =

American government program

National Sheep Industry Improvement Center — The Federal Agriculture Improvement and Reform Act of 1996 (P.L. 104-127) established a revolving fund of up to $50 million, to be used by a new, eventually privatized, center that aims to revive the declining U.S. sheep and goat industries through loans and loan guarantees for such activities as improving production and marketing methods, purchasing new equipment, and modernizing processing facilities.
