= European Affairs Committee (House of Lords) =

Select committee of the UK House of Lords

The European Affairs Committee is a select committee of the House of Lords in the Parliament of the United Kingdom. It was formed in April 2021 with the primary purpose to "consider matters relating to the United Kingdom's relationship with the European Union and the European Economic Area".

== Chairs ==
Committee chairs include those listed below.

Name	Start	End	Party
The Lord Roper	3 December 2008	1 May 2012	Liberal Democrats
The Lord Boswell of Aynho	16 May 2012	9 September 2019	Conservative
The Earl of Kinnoull	9 September 2019	12 June 2023	Crossbench
The Lord Ricketts	12 June 2023	27 January 2026	Crossbench
The Lord Stirrup	27 January 2026	present	Crossbench

== Membership ==
As of July 2026, the membership of the committee is as follows:

Member	Party
Lord Stirrup(Chair)	Crossbench
Baroness Ashton of Upholland	Labour
Lord Barrow	Crossbench
Lord Brennan of Canton	Labour
Lord Elliott of Mickle Fell	Conservative
Lord Grantchester	Labour
Baroness Gustafsson	Labour
Lord Jackson of Peterborough	Conservative
Lord Moynihan of Chelsea	Conservative
Baroness Smith of Newnham	Liberal Democrat
Baroness Suttie	Liberal Democrat
Lord Tugendhat	Conservative
Duke of Wellington	Crossbench

== Sub-committee ==
The Windsor Framework Sub-Committee (formerly named the Sub-Committee on the Protocol on Ireland/Northern Ireland) was a standalone sub-committee of the European Affairs Committee. Its focus was to consider matters pertaining to the Windsor Framework and the corresponding Northern Ireland Protocol, including any relevant legislation passed by the European Union. The sub-committee's mandate ended upon the May 2024 dissolution of Parliament. The Northern Ireland Scrutiny Committee was appointed in January 2025 to replace the Windor Framework Sub-Committee's previous role.
