= Member states of the Comprehensive and Progressive Agreement for Trans-Pacific Partnership =

Members of the Comprehensive and Progressive Agreement for Trans-Pacific Partnership
- Location: CPTPP
- Created: 30 December 2018
- Number: 12 (as of 2025)
- Populations: 580 million

The Comprehensive and Progressive Agreement for Trans-Pacific Partnership is a trade and economic integration agreement that consists of twelve members.

== Members ==
Below is a breakdown of economic information for each member.

Member	Entry into force	Population	Area (km2)	GDP ($)	Currency
Australia	30 December 2018	27,629,300	7,688,287	1,898.00bn	Australian dollar
Brunei	12 July 2023	460,345	5,765	15.78bn	Brunei dollar
Canada	30 December 2018	41,465,298	9,984,670	2,582.00bn	Canadian dollar
Chile	21 February 2023	19,629,588	756,102	674.38bn	Chilean peso
Japan	30 December 2018	123,590,000	377,975	6,572.00bn	Japanese yen
Malaysia	29 November 2022	34,564,810	330,803	1,306.00bn	Malaysian ringgit
Mexico	30 December 2018	131,946,900	1,972,550	3,408.00bn	Mexican peso
New Zealand	30 December 2018	5,452,630	263,310	279.18bn	New Zealand dollar
Peru	19 January 2021	34,352,720	1,285,216	566.58bn	Puruvian sol
Singapore	30 December 2018	6,040,000	736	879.98bn	Singapore dollar
United Kingdom	15 December 2024	68,265,209	244,376	4,282.00bn	Pound sterling
Vietnam	14 January 2019	100,300,000	331,345	1,559.00bn	Vietnamese dong

== Legislative process ==
=== Summary ===
An overview of the legislative process in selected states is shown below:

Signatory	Signature	Institution	Conclusion date	In favour	Against	AB	Deposited	Effective	Ref.
Mexico	8 March 2018	Senate	24 April 2018	73	24		28 June 2018	30 December 2018	
Mexico	8 March 2018	Presidential Assent	21 May 2018	Granted			28 June 2018	30 December 2018	
Japan	8 March 2018	House of Representatives	18 May 2018	Majority approval (Standing vote)			6 July 2018	30 December 2018	
Japan	8 March 2018	House of Councillors	13 June 2018	168	69		6 July 2018	30 December 2018	
Singapore	8 March 2018	No parliamentary approval required					19 July 2018	30 December 2018	
New Zealand	8 March 2018	House of Representatives	24 October 2018	111	8		25 October 2018	30 December 2018	
New Zealand	8 March 2018	Royal assent	25 October 2018	Granted			25 October 2018	30 December 2018	
Canada	8 March 2018	House of Commons	16 October 2018	236	44	1	29 October 2018	30 December 2018	
Canada	8 March 2018	Senate	25 October 2018	Majority approval (Voice vote)			29 October 2018	30 December 2018	
Canada	8 March 2018	Royal assent	25 October 2018	Granted			29 October 2018	30 December 2018	
Australia	8 March 2018	House of Representatives	19 September 2018	Majority approval (Standing vote)			31 October 2018	30 December 2018	
Australia	8 March 2018	Senate	17 October 2018	33	15		31 October 2018	30 December 2018	
Australia	8 March 2018	Royal assent	19 October 2018	Granted			31 October 2018	30 December 2018	
Vietnam	8 March 2018	National Assembly	12 November 2018	469	0	16	15 November 2018	14 January 2019	
Peru	8 March 2018	Congress	14 July 2021	97	0	9	21 July 2021	19 September 2021	
Malaysia	8 March 2018	Cabinet of Malaysia					30 September 2022	29 November 2022	
Chile	8 March 2018	Chamber of Deputies	17 April 2019	77	68	2	23 December 2022	21 February 2023	
Chile	8 March 2018	Senate	11 October 2022	27	10	1	23 December 2022	21 February 2023	
Brunei	8 March 2018	No parliamentary approval required					13 May 2023	12 July 2023	

The following country has signed an accession protocol to accede to CPTPP.

Signatory	Application	Negotiations		Signature	Institution	Passed	In favour	Against	AB	Deposited	Effective	Ref.
United Kingdom	1 February 2021	Opened	2 June 2021	16 July 2023	House of Lords	23 January 2024	Majority approval (Voice vote)			17 May 2024	15 December 2024	
United Kingdom	1 February 2021	Concluded	31 March 2023	16 July 2023	House of Commons	19 March 2024	Majority approval (Voice vote)			17 May 2024	15 December 2024	
United Kingdom	1 February 2021	Concluded	31 March 2023	16 July 2023	Royal assent	20 March 2024	Granted			17 May 2024	15 December 2024	

The following countries have initiated or concluded negotiations for accession:

Signatory	Application	Negotiations		Signature	Institution	Passed	In favour	Against	AB	Deposited	Effective	Ref.
Costa Rica	10 August 2022	Opened	5 December 2024		Legislative Assembly							
Costa Rica	10 August 2022	Concluded	6 May 2026		Legislative Assembly							
Costa Rica	10 August 2022	Concluded	6 May 2026		Sala IV Court Check							
Uruguay	1 December 2022	Opened	21 November 2025		General Assembly							
Uruguay	1 December 2022	Concluded			General Assembly							
Uruguay	1 December 2022	Concluded			Executive Ratification							
Indonesia	19 September 2024	Opened	27 June 2026		House of Representatives							
Indonesia	19 September 2024	Concluded			House of Representatives							
Philippines	August 2025	Opened	27 June 2026		Senate							
Philippines	August 2025	Concluded			Senate							
United Arab Emirates	August 2025	Opened	27 June 2026		Federal Supreme Council							
United Arab Emirates	August 2025	Concluded			Federal Supreme Council							

=== Ratifications ===
On 28 June 2018, Mexico became the first country to finish its domestic ratification procedure of the CPTPP, with President Enrique Peña Nieto stating, "With this new generation agreement, Mexico diversifies its economic relations with the world and demonstrates its commitment to openness and free trade".

On 6 July 2018, Japan became the second country to ratify the agreement.

On 19 July 2018, Singapore became the third country to ratify the agreement and deposit its instrument of ratification.

On 17 October 2018, the Australian Federal Parliament passed relevant legislation through the Senate. The official ratification was deposited on 31 October 2018. This two-week gap made Australia the sixth signatory to deposit its ratification of the agreement, and it came into force 60 days later.

On 25 October 2018, New Zealand ratified the CPTPP, increasing the number of countries that had formally ratified the agreement to four.

Also on 25 October 2018, Canada passed and was granted royal assent on the enabling legislation. The official ratification was deposited on 29 October 2018.

On 2 November 2018, the CPTPP and related documents were submitted to the National Assembly of Vietnam for ratification. On 12 November 2018, the National Assembly passed a resolution unanimously ratifying the CPTPP. The Vietnamese government officially notified New Zealand of its ratification on 15 November 2018.

On 14 July 2021, the CPTPP was approved by the Congress of the Republic of Peru. The official ratification was deposited on 21 July 2021.

On 30 September 2022, Malaysia ratified the CPTPP and deposited its instrument of ratification.

On 17 April 2019, the CPTPP was approved by the Chamber of Deputies of Chile. The final round of approval in the Senate was scheduled for November 2019, after being approved by its Commission of Constitution. However, due to a series of massive protests against the government of Sebastián Piñera, the ratification process was paused. Only in 2022, the ratification process was resumed after a new Congress and a new President were elected. Despite the public opposition of Gabriel Boric to the treaty before his election as President, the new administration did not interfere in the voting. The CPTPP was approved in the Senate with 27 votes in favor (mainly from the right-wing opposition and some center-left politicians) and 10 against, mostly by members of the ruling coalition. The treaty was deposited on 23 December, once several side letters were negotiated with the other signatories in specific topics considered harmful by the Chilean government. On 23 February 2023, Boric ratified Chile's entry to TPP-11.

On 13 May 2023, Brunei ratified the CPTPP and deposited its instrument of ratification.

=== Entry into force ===
The agreement came into effect 60 days after ratification and deposit of accession documents by at least half the signatories (six of the eleven signatories). Australia was the sixth country to ratify the agreement, which was deposited with New Zealand on 31 October 2018, and consequently the agreement came into force between Australia, Canada, Japan, Mexico, New Zealand, and Singapore on 30 December 2018.

On 1 January 2019, Australia, Canada, Mexico, New Zealand, and Singapore implemented a second round of tariff cuts. Japan's second tariff cut took place on 1 April 2019.

On 15 November 2018, Vietnam deposited the accession documents, and the agreement entered into force in Vietnam on 14 January 2019.

On 21 July 2021, Peru deposited the accession documents, and the agreement entered into force in Peru on 19 September 2021.

On 30 September 2022, Malaysia deposited the accession documents, and the agreement entered into force in Malaysia on 29 November 2022.

On 23 December 2022, Chile deposited the accession documents, and the agreement entered into force in Chile on 21 February 2023.

On 13 May 2023, Brunei deposited the accession documents, and the agreement entered into force in Brunei on 12 July 2023.

== Accession of the United Kingdom ==
CPTPP Signatories United Kingdom Crown Dependencies and Overseas Territories

=== Background ===
In January 2018, the government of the United Kingdom stated that it was exploring membership of the CPTPP to stimulate exports after Brexit and had held informal discussions with several of the members. In October 2018, Japanese Prime Minister Shinzo Abe said he would welcome the United Kingdom joining the partnership post-Brexit. Liz Truss, the UK Secretary of State for Trade, expressed in a joint Daily Telegraph article with Simon Birmingham, David Parker, and Chan Chun Sing, the trade ministers of Australia, New Zealand, and Singapore, the intent of the United Kingdom to join the CPTPP.

On 1 February 2021, the United Kingdom formally applied to join CPTPP. The UK is the first non-founding country to apply to join the CPTPP. If successful, Britain would become the second-largest CPTPP economy, after Japan. Japan had expressed support for the UK's potential entry into CPTPP in 2018, and as 4th CPTPP Commission (2021) chair, Japan's minister in charge of negotiations on the trade pact, Yasutoshi Nishimura, expressed hope on Twitter that Britain will "demonstrate its strong determination to fully comply with high-standard obligations" of the free trade accord, and mentioned that "I believe that the UK's accession request will have a great potential to expand the high-standard rules beyond the Asia-Pacific."

In June 2021, the CPTPP agreed to open accession talks. A working group was established to discuss tariffs and rules governing investment and trade, led by Japan.

By March 2023, the United Kingdom was set to join the CPTPP, as the 11 members had reached an agreement to Britain's accession. The UK government also announced it had secured an extension mechanism, which could extend the whole agreement to any Crown Dependency or British Overseas Territory. On the same day, Guernsey and Jersey confirmed their intentions to participate in CPTPP. In May 2023, a UK government spokesman confirmed that "the deal will cover goods trade between the Crown Dependencies and CPTPP countries, with a mechanism to include trade in services in future."

The United Kingdom formally signed the CPTPP trade deal during the 7th CPTPP Commission - or members ministerial meeting - in New Zealand on 16 July 2023, becoming the first non-original signatory and European country to sign the agreement.

=== Ratification Timeline ===
- The agreement would enter into force if, within 15 months of signing the agreement, all or at least six (6) CPTPP members had ratified the accession protocol.
- On 29 August 2024, the UK announced it had secured the final ratification required to join the CPTPP.
- The agreement entered into force on 15 December 2024 for those countries which had ratified the agreement before 16 October 2024.
- The agreement entered into force with Australia, Mexico and Canada in December 2024, June 2026 and September 2026 respectively.

=== Ratifiers ===
==== Before 16 October 2024 ====
For those countries who ratified the accession protocol before 16 October 2024, the agreement entered into force from 15 December 2024:

- Japan: Fully ratified the UK's accession and notified New Zealand on 15 December 2023.
- Singapore: Fully ratified the UK's accession and notified New Zealand on 17 January 2024.
- Chile: Fully ratified the UK's accession and notified New Zealand on 3 April 2024.
- United Kingdom: Fully ratified its own accession and notified New Zealand on 16 May 2024.
- New Zealand: Fully ratified the UK's accession on 4 June 2024.
- Vietnam: Fully ratified the UK's accession and notified New Zealand on 1 August 2024.
- Peru: Fully ratified the accession of the UK and notified New Zealand on 28 August 2024.
- Malaysia: Fully ratified the accession of the UK and notified New Zealand on 17 September 2024.
- Brunei: Fully ratified the accession of the UK and notified New Zealand on 16 October 2024.

==== After 16 October 2024 ====
For those countries who ratified the accession protocol after 16 October 2024, the agreement entered into force 60 days after ratification:

- Australia: Fully ratified the accession of the UK and notified New Zealand on 25 October 2024. The agreement entered into force on 24 December 2024.
- Mexico: Fully ratified the accession of the UK and notified New Zealand on 23 April 2026. The agreement entered into force on 22 June 2026.
- Canada: Fully ratified the accession of the UK and notified New Zealand on 3 July 2026. The agreement entered into force on 1 September 2026.

== See also ==
- Free trade agreements of the United Kingdom
