= Japan–United Kingdom Comprehensive Economic Partnership Agreement =

Japan–United Kingdom CEPA
English: Agreement between Japan and the United Kingdom of Great Britain and Northern Ireland for a Comprehensive Economic Partnership Japanese: 包括的な経済上の連携に関する日本国とグレートブリテン及び北アイルランド連合王国との間の協定
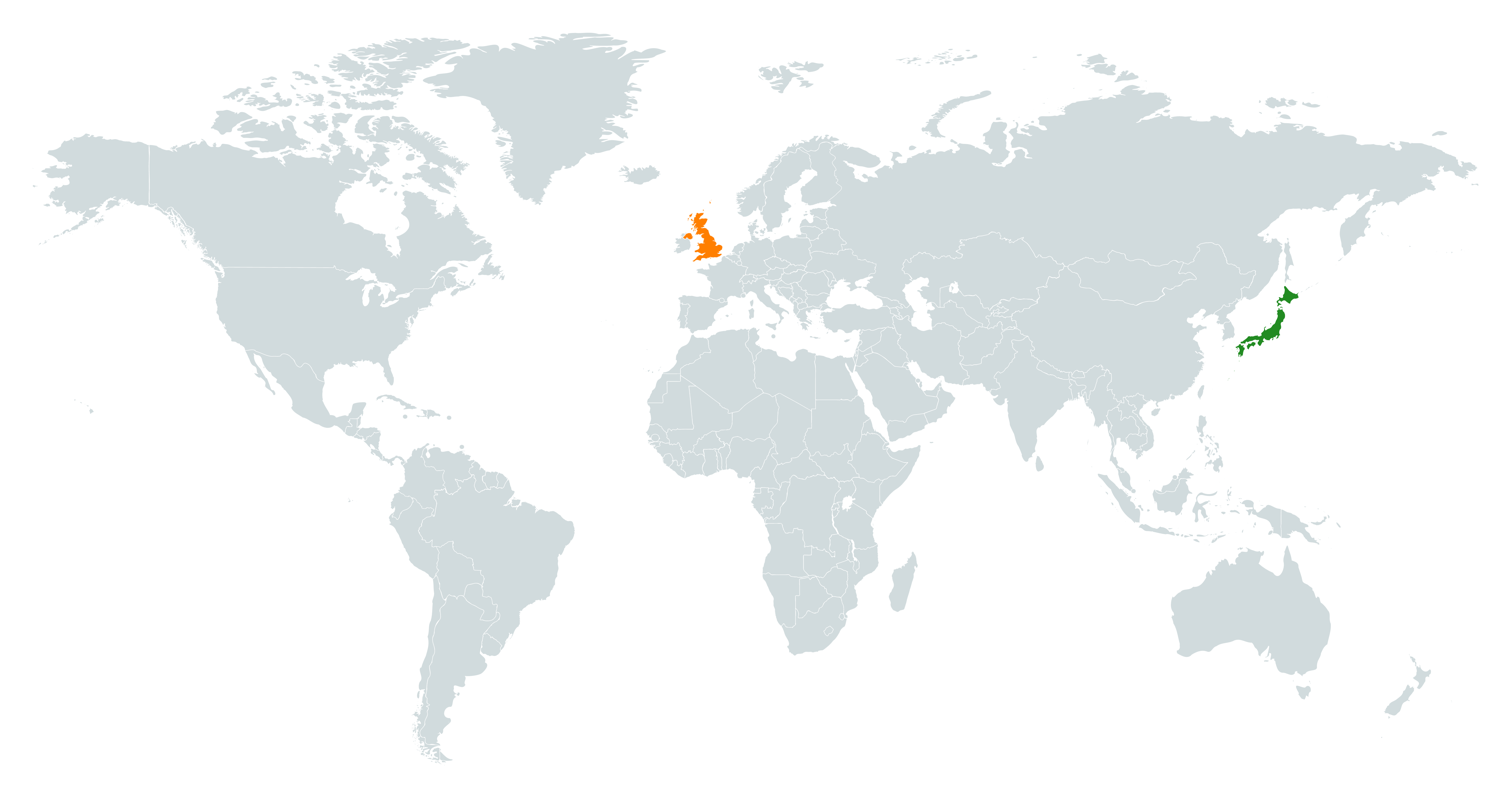
- Japan United Kingdom
- Type: Free Trade Agreement and Economic Integration Agreement
- Context: Trade agreement between Japan and the United Kingdom
- Drafted: 11 September 2020
- Signed: 23 October 2020
- Location: Tokyo, Japan
- Effective: 1 January 2021
- Condition: Approval by all signatories
- Negotiators: (Japan) Toshimitsu Motegi; (United Kingdom) Liz Truss
- Parties: Japan; United Kingdom
- Languages: English; Japanese

The Japan–United Kingdom Comprehensive Economic Partnership Agreement (CEPA) (Japanese: 日英包括的経済連携協定) is a free trade agreement between the United Kingdom and Japan. The agreement was agreed in principle by both parties in September 2020 and signed in Tokyo in October 2020, following the United Kingdom's withdrawal from the European Union in January 2020. It entered into force at the end of the transition period on 31 December 2020.

== History ==
On 9 June 2020 Toshimitsu Motegi, Japan's Minister for Foreign Affairs, and Liz Truss, the UK's Secretary of State for International Trade, agreed to launch negotiations and to establish the future economic partnership between Japan and the United Kingdom. On 10 June 2020 the first meeting of chief negotiators was held after the launch of negotiations on the future economic partnership between Japan and the UK. This was followed by video conference rounds on 24 June, and on 8, 15, 22 and 29 July. The seventh, and final, round was held on 3 August.

The agreement is largely similar to the Japan–European Union Economic Partnership Agreement concluded in February 2019, but with small changes made in regards to financial services, digital trade and rules of origin.

The UK–Japan Comprehensive Economic Partnership Agreement was agreed in principle by Truss and Motegi on a video call on 11 September 2020.

The UK–Japan Comprehensive Economic Partnership Agreement was signed by International Trade Secretary Liz Truss and Japan's Foreign Minister Toshimitsu Motegi in Tokyo 23 October 2020.

== Areas covered in the FTA ==
- Agriculture, food and drink
- Manufacturing
- Digital and data
- Financial services
- Creative industry
- Fashion
- Small and medium enterprises (SMEs)
- Services
- Investment
- Goods

== Impact ==
=== Macroeconomic projects and baseline debate ===
Before the agreement took effect on 1 January 2021, the UK Department for International Trade released an Impact Assessment estimating that CEPA would boost the UK's long-term GDP by £1.5 billion (or 0.07%) and increase bilateral trade by £15.7 billion over 15 years relative to 2019 levels.

However, these figures drew criticism from parliamentary scrutiny bodies including the House of Commons International Trade Committee and the House of Lords International Agreements Sub-Committee as well as trade economists at the UK Trade Policy Observatory (UKTPO). They pointed out that the government calculated these benefits against a worst-case “no-deal” baseline where trade reverted to basic World Trade Organization (WTO) rules.

Since CEPA largely rolled over the existing terms of the EU-Japan Economic Partnership Agreement (JEEPA) that the UK already used, analysts argued that comparing CEPA to WTO rules exaggerated its actual economic boost. When evaluated against the real-world starting point of JEEPA, experts concluded that the new agreement offered little to no additional net economic or GDP growth.

=== Trade in goods and tariff rate quotas ===
Tariff reduction schedules under CEPA closely mirror those of JEEPA, picking up immediately with the third-year tariff cuts established under the prior EU agreement. Under both treaties, 99.66% of UK exports to Japan are set to become duty-free by 2039. Out of 9,444 individual tariff lines, CEPA offered lower rates than JEEPA on just 10 items such as certain hides, leathers, and spirits although the UK recorded no exports in any of these categories between 2017 and 2019.

For agricultural trade, CEPA retained 10 of JEEPA's 25 Tariff Rate Quotas (TRQs) for key products like soft cheese, wheat, and butter. However, British exporters were granted only secondary access to these quotas, using surplus allocation remaining after EU exporters fulfilled their share, which placed UK agri-food producers at a competitive disadvantage compared to their EU competitors. Access to the remaining 15 agricultural quotas under JEEPA was eliminated completely. To support Japanese manufacturing operations in the UK, tariffs were removed immediately on select industrial inputs, including certain automobile parts, rail cars, and electronic control panels.

=== Trade in services, digital trade, and intellectual property ===
Services and investment rules under Chapter 8 follow a “negative list” approach identical to JEEPA, meaning that all sectors are automatically opened to trade and investment unless explicitly listed as reservations in an annex. This structure liberalises services across the board while preserving specific national exemptions and public policy protections, such as audiovisual cultural services.

The main updates beyond JEEPA focus on rule-making for digital trade, financial services, business travel, and inclusive trade:

- Digital and data trade: CEPA introduced new digital rules prohibiting requirements to store data locally, banning forced transfers of source code or algorithms, enforcing net neutrality, protecting encryption technology, and guaranteeing free cross-border data flows, shifting the UK closer to CPTPP and U.S. digital models.
- Financial services: The agreement updated regulation by defining “financial service computing facilities”, streamlining approval for new financial products, and increasing regulatory transparency.
- Intellectual property: CEPA increased cooperation between trademark authorities, added protections against bad-faith trademark registrations. It also set up a process to consider protecting additional geographical indications (GIs) beyond the seven original UK items covered under JEEPA.
- Business mobility: Temporary entry rules were expanded to cover corporate investors (for stays up to one year), allowed partners and children to accompany intra-corporate transferees, and set a 90-day target for processing visas.
- Inclusive trade: CEPA created a new chapter (Chapter 21) on “Trade and Women’s Economic Empowerment”, establishing a Working Group to promote gender equality and cooperation in international trade.

=== Foreign direct investment and investment protections ===
Chapter 8 of CEPA contains standard market liberalisation commitments, including Market Access (Article 8.7), National Treatment (Article 8.8), Most-Favoured-Nation Treatment (Article 8.9), and bans on performance requirements such as forced technology transfers (Article 8.11). However, unlike traditional Bilateral Investment Treaties, CEPA excludes investor protections.

The agreement also excludes an Investor-State Dispute Settlement (ISDS) mechanism. Investment disputes are limited to state-to-state arbitration under Chapter 22. Article 8.9.4 also stops foreign investors from using Most-Favoured-Nation rules to claim ISDS rights from other trade agreements. Legal scholars note that this light-touch investment framework reflects UK caution regarding ISDS, as well as strong mutual confidence in the judicial independence and rule of law of both nations. Article 8.5.3 contains a review clause allowing signatories to reconsider ISDS if either state enters into a future trade deal containing investor protections. However, legal scholars note that a separate bilateral review is largely unnecessary because Japan supports the UK joining the Comprehensive and Progressive Agreement for Trans-Pacific Partnership (CPTPP). That broader regional trade agreement already provides full investor safeguards, including guarantees of Fair and Equitable Treatment, Full Protection and Security, and access to Investor-State Dispute Settlement (ISDS) arbitration.

=== Four-year post-implementation trade performance ===
Four-year monitoring statistics published by the UK Department for Business and Trade (DBT) through mid-2025 provide early empirical evidence of trade and investment outcomes under CEPA:

- Total bilateral trade: In the 12 months to June 2025, total trade between the UK and Japan reached £33.1 billion, a 13.0% increase (£3.8 billion) compared to 2018 prices. However, this growth lagged overall UK trade growth with the rest of the world (+31.7%) over the same timeframe, causing Japan to fall from the UK's 12th to 14th largest trading partner.
- Services trade: UK services exports to Japan rose 30.2% above 2018 levels to £6.9 billion, trailing global UK service export growth (+63.5%). Key growth sectors included telecommunications, computer, and information services (+110.9%), other business services (+101.8%), and insurance and pension services (+31.6%). Over the same period, UK service imports from Japan grew by 49.7%, driven primarily by transport services (+314.9%) and intellectual property (+142.3%).
- Goods trade: Excluding unspecified goods, UK goods exports to Japan grew 5.8% (£408 million) compared to 2018, led by crude materials (+211.5%), material manufactures (+43.2%), and chemicals (+37.8%). By contrast, UK goods imports from Japan fell 15.2% (£1.5 billion) driven largely by a 15.7% decline in machinery and transport equipment contrasting with a 20.1% increase in UK goods imports globally.
- Foreign direct investment: By 2023, the stock of Japanese inward foreign direct investment (FDI) in the UK stood at £86.5 billion, representing a 3.8% drop from 2018 and a decline from its 2020 peak of £109.8 billion. Outward UK FDI stock in Japan fell by 56.9% to £4.2 billion over the same period.
- Tariff preference utilization: Businesses made strong early use of reduced tariffs under the deal. Between 2022 and 2023, 63.0% of preference-eligible UK exports to Japan used reduced tariffs, saving an estimated £58 million in duties. Between 2023 and 2024, 73.9% of eligible UK imports from Japan utilized preferential terms, generating £311 million in estimated duty savings (primarily in transport equipment).

=== Regional impact ===
The macroeconomic impact of CEPA across UK nations and regions has been minor to modest overall. In Wales, economic ties with Japan were already small prior CEPA: in 2019, Welsh goods exports to Japan made up just 1.7% of its total global exports, and Japanese foreign direct investment in Wales represented 5.5% of the UK total. As a result, economists evaluated CEPA's overall economic impact on Wales as negligible compared to trading under either basic World Trade Organization rules or the prior EU-Japan deal.

Across English regions, post-2018 growth in goods exports to Japan was concentrated in specific areas. The strongest export increases occurred in the East Midlands (+43.5%), the North West (+33.0%), and the West Midlands (+29.9%), whereas exports from the South East (-45.2%) and the East of England (-33.3%) saw notable declines.

== See also ==
- List of bilateral free trade agreements
- List of multilateral free trade agreements
- Free trade agreements of the United Kingdom
