= Advisory Committee on European Affairs =

Belgian committee on European affairs

The Advisory Committee on European Affairs (Dutch: Adviescomité voor Europese aangelegenheden, French: Comité d'avis chargé des questions européennes) is a committee of the Belgian Chamber of Representatives. The committee consists of 10 Representatives, including the President of the Chamber of Representatives, and 10 Belgian Members of the European Parliament. It is chaired by the President of the Chamber, or by a Vice-President of the Chamber designated by the President. The committee is responsible for giving advice on European affairs.

The 20 members of the committee are ex officio members of the Federal Advisory Committee on European Affairs.
