= List of exports of the United Kingdom =

Exports of the United Kingdom by product category (2019) Chemical products Transportation Machines Mineral products Plastics and rubbers Metals Foodstuffs Precious metals Textiles Instruments Animal products Vegetable products Paper goods Footwear and headwear Miscellaneous Stone and glass Wood products Animal and vegetable bi-products Animal hides Arts and antiques Weapons

The following is a list of the exports of the United Kingdom.

The UK exports to 160 nations. The UK is the fifth largest exporter.

Data is for 2019, in millions of gbp (pounds), as reported by International Trade Centre. Currently the top fifty exports are listed.

#	Product	Value (in millions of USD)
1	Cars	38,574
2	Gas turbines	26,385
3	Crude petroleum	23,673
4	Gold	23,316
5	Pharmaceuticals	18,023
6	Unspecified commodities	17,874
7	Aircraft parts	15,981
8	Refined petroleum	11,846
9	Paintings	8,889
10	Hard liquor	7,876
11	Human and animal blood	7,403
12	Platinum	6,855
13	Jewellery	6,622
14	Vehicle parts	6,486
15	Telephones	5,120
16	Computers	4,858
17	Combustion engines	4,301
18	Nitrogen heterocyclic compounds	4,072
19	Valves	3,222
20	Centrifuges	3,040
21	Petroleum gas	2,777
22	Medical instruments	2,626
23	Scrap iron	2,589
24	Brochures	2,576
25	Construction vehicles	2,444
26	Chemical analysis instruments	2,397
27	Beauty products	2,259
28	Liquid pumps	2,208
29	Low-voltage protection equipment	2,149
30	Seats	2,040
31	Laboratory reagents	1,980
32	Diamonds	1,932
33	Trucks	1,845
34	Orthopedic Devices	1,845
35	Airplanes, helicopters and Spacecraft	1,828
36	Yachts	1,813
37	Regulators	1,790
38	Spark-ignition engines	1,772
39	Food preparation utensils	1,764
40	Non-Knit Women's Suits	1,679
41	Machinery having individual functions	1,667
42	Insulated electrical conductor	1,661
43	Combustion engine parts	1,654
44	Offset printing machine	1,638
45	Air pumps	1,617
46	Tractors	1,543
47	Plastic	1,537
48	Measuring instruments	1,537
49	Integrated circuits	1,528
50	Pesticides	1,473
