= Federal Advisory Committee on European Affairs =

The Federal Advisory Committee on European Affairs (Dutch: Federaal adviescomité voor Europese aangelegenheden, French: Comité d'avis fédéral chargé des questions européennes) is a joint committee of the Federal Parliament of Belgium. It consists of the members of the Advisory Committee on European Affairs of the Chamber of Representatives, which is composed of 10 Representatives and 10 Belgian Members of the European Parliament, and 10 members of the Senate. It is chaired alternately by the Chairperson of the Chamber's Advisory Committee on European Affairs and by a Senator. The First Deputy Chairperson of the Federal Committee is a member of the other Chamber of the Federal Parliament and the Second Deputy Chairperson is a member of the European Parliament.
