= National parliaments of the European Union =

Legislatures of member states of the European Union

The national parliaments of the European Union are those legislatures responsible for each member state of the European Union (EU). They have a certain degree of institutionalised influence which was expanded under the Treaty of Lisbon to include greater ability to scrutinise proposed European Union law.

== Relations ==
Originally, national members of Parliament (MPs) were appointed to the European Parliament (EP) as Member of the European Parliament (MEPs). In 1979 the first direct elections were held, however national MPs still tended to contest these leading to them holding a "dual mandate". As the work load of an MEP increased, the number of MEPs who were also national MPs decreased and since 2009 it has been banned in all member states.

In 1989 MPs from national parliaments and the European Parliament established the Conference of European Community Affairs Committees (COSAC) to maintain contact between national parliaments and the MEPs. COSAC continues to meet every six months and has now gained the right to submit contributions and examine proposals on EU law relating to Justice and Home Affairs. Aside from COSAC, relations between the EP and national parliaments are dealt with by the Conference of Presidents. The EP seeks to keep national parliament's fully informed of the EPs activities and some EP committees regularly invites national MPs to discuss proposals.

However COSAC itself has little institutional structure and is largely leaderless meaning it is difficult for it to exercise its powers. Any concerted response tends to be spontaneous and self organised.

== Role and powers ==
Because the Maastricht Treaty of 1993 expanded the EU's competencies into areas of justice and home affairs, the treaty outlined the importance of exchanges between the European parliament and its national counterparts in a declaration attached to the treaty. This declaration asked national governments to ensure proposals for EU law were passed on to national parliaments with sufficient time for them to be scrutinised by MP and that contacts between these MPs and MEPs, began with COSAC, be stepped up.

This was strengthened under the Treaty of Amsterdam in a protocol stating all European Commission consultation documents be promptly forwarded to national parliaments. They then have a six-week period to discuss legislative proposals, starting from the publication of the proposal to it appearing on the agenda of the Council of the European Union.

The Treaty of Lisbon, in force from 1 December 2009, expanded the role of national parliaments. It sets out a right to information (TEU Article 12, TFEU Articles 70 and 352 and Protocol 1), monitoring of subsidiarity – see below – (TFEU Article 69), scrutinising policy in freedom, justice and security with the ability for a national parliament to veto a proposal (TEFU Articles 81, 85 and 88), taking part in treaty amendment (TEU Article 48) (including blocking a change of voting system to ordinary legislative procedure under the passerelle clause), being involved with enlargement and generally being involved in dialogue with EU institutions (TEU Article 12).

Their power to enforce the principle of subsidiarity is of particular note. The principle is that, unless EU institutions have exclusive power, action will only be taken at a European level if it were to be more effective than acting at a national level. If a national parliament believes this principle has been broken, then this triggers a two-stage procedure: if one-third of national parliaments agree that a proposal breaks the principle, then the commission has to withdraw, amend or maintain it. If the commission maintains its proposal and a majority of parliaments continue to object, then the commission will have to explain its reasons. However it may still continue, as this power does not challenge the legislative role of the Council and European Parliament. The first time the objections-threshold of 1/3 was reached was in 2012 with the Monti II Regulation.

Prior to the Lisbon Treaty's enforcement, COSAC ran tests on the subsidiarity system to test and improve their response time to a question subsidiarity. Tests ended once Lisbon came into force and national parliament's responses to EU legislative proposals have become minimal. Although COSAC is primarily technical, it has been started to become more political especially since the Lisbon Treaty. They have begun to discuss more general political events and foreign policy issues. It is debated whether, in the limited time COSAC meetings have, it should be discussing subjects where it has such limited influence.

== Defence policy ==
As the Western European Union (WEU) was integrated into the European Union's Common Security and Defence Policy, the European Parliament took on a greater role. However, the Assembly of the Western European Union was retained to hold members to account for military missions. With the European Parliament not seen as sufficient to take over this role, there was some desire to see the WEU's Assembly retained, rather than abolished as the European Parliament wished. However, with the closure of the WEU (and its assembly) in 2010, there were proposals to ensure that EU cooperation between national parliaments took over its role informally through regular meetings of defence-interested national MPs. The Lisbon Treaty calls for COSAC to establish a body to scrutinise European foreign and defence policy; this has taken the form of the Inter-Parliamentary Conference for the Common Foreign and Security Policy and the Common Security and Defence Policy.

== Differences ==
unicameral bicameral

There are a number of differences between the national parliaments of member states, owing to the various historical development of each country. 15 states have unicameral parliaments, with the remainders choosing bicameral systems.

Unicameral or lower houses are always directly elected, whereas an upper house may be directly elected (e.g. the Senate of Poland); or indirectly elected, for example, by regional legislatures (e.g. the Federal Council of Austria); or non-elected, but representing certain interest groups (e.g. the National Council of Slovenia).

Furthermore, most states are Parliamentary democracies, hence the executive is drawn from the Parliament. However, in some cases a more presidential system is followed and hence there are separate elections for the head of government and the Parliament, leading to greater discontinuity, yet more independence, between the two branches of government. However, only Cyprus follows a fully presidential system, with France following a semi-presidential system.

== Overview ==
Member state	Parliament	House	Size	Term length (years)	Electoral threshold	Electoral system	Candidate selection	Lower to upper house size	Joint convention	Total size
Austria	Austrian Parliament	National Council	183	5	4%	Party-list PR (largest remainder) (Note: For constituencies; the D'Hondt method is used to assign leveling seats.)	Open list	3.00	Federal Assembly	244
Austria	Austrian Parliament	Federal Council	61	5 or 6 (Note: Based on the appointing state parliament's term.)	N/A	Appointment by state parliaments		3.00	Federal Assembly	244
Belgium	Federal Parliament	Chamber of Representatives	150	5	5%	Party-list PR (D'Hondt)	Open list	2.50	United Chambers	210
Belgium	Federal Parliament	Senate	60	5	N/A	50 seats: Indirect election by the community and regional parliaments, based on their own election results 10 seats: Co-option by the remaining senators based on the election results to the Chamber of Representatives		2.50	United Chambers	210
Bulgaria	National Assembly		240	4	4%	Party-list PR (largest remainder)	Open list	—N/a		240
Croatia	Croatian Parliament		151	4	5%	Party-list PR (D'Hondt)	Open list	—N/a		151
Cyprus	House of Representatives		56	5	3.6%	Party-list PR (largest remainder)	Open list	—N/a		56
Czech Republic	Parliament	Chamber of Deputies	200	4	5% (Note: For single parties; the threshold is 10% for coalitions of two parties, 15% for coalitions of three parties, and 20% for coalitions of four or more parties)	Party-list PR (D'Hondt)	Open list	2.47	No special name	281
Czech Republic	Parliament	Senate	81	6 (Note: Renewed by thirds every two years.)	N/A	Two-round system		2.47	No special name	281
Denmark	Folketing		179	4	2%	Party-list PR (D'Hondt) (Note: For constituencies; the largest remainder method is used to assign leveling seats.)	Open list	—N/a		179
Estonia	Riigikogu		101	4	5%	Party-list PR (D'Hondt)	Open list	—N/a		101
Finland	Parliament		200	4	—	Party-list PR (D'Hondt)	Open list	—N/a		200
France	Parliament	National Assembly	577	5	N/A	Two-round system		1.66	Congress of the French Parliament	925
France	Parliament	Senate	348	6 (Note: Renewed by halves every three years.)	— (Note: For Senators elected by PR; Not applicable to Senators elected by 2RV)	Indirect election by National Assembly members and regional, departmental, and municipal councils Two-round system (constituencies with 3 seats of fewer); Party-list PR (highest averages) (other constituencies)	Closed list	1.66	Congress of the French Parliament	925
Germany	— (Note: The German Constitution defines the Bundestag and Bundesrat as two separate legislative institutions, rather than the lower and upper houses of a bicameral parliament. Therefore, the federal legislature of Germany consists of two unicameral legislative institutions.)	Bundestag	630	4	5% (Note: Parties which represent minorities or which obtained at least three FPTP seats are exempt)	Mixed-member PR (Sainte-Laguë)	Closed list	10.71	No joint conventions	808
Germany	—	Bundesrat	69	Varies (Note: Same as the appointing state government.)	N/A	Appointment by state governments		10.71	No joint conventions	808
Greece	Hellenic Parliament		300	4	3%	250 seats: Party-list PR (largest remainder); 50 seats: Majority bonus to the largest party	Open list	—N/a		300
Hungary	National Assembly		199	4	5% (Note: For single parties; the threshold is 10% for coalitions of two parties and 15% for coalitions of three or more parties. Minority parties are exempt.)	Scorporo (106 D'Hondt / 93 First-past-the-post)	Closed list	—N/a		199
Ireland	Oireachtas	Dáil Éireann	160	5	N/A	Single transferable vote		2.67	No special name	220
Ireland	Oireachtas	Seanad Éireann	60	5	N/A	Single transferable vote 6 seats: Direct election by graduates of Dublin University and the National University of Ireland; 43 seats: Indirect election by members of the Dáil and local councils from vocational panels 11 seats: Appointment by the Taoiseach		2.67	No special name	220
Italy	Italian Parliament	Chamber of Deputies	400	5	3%	Parallel voting with mixed single vote (253 largest remainder (Note: 245 within Italy and 8 by Italian citizens overseas) / 147 first-past-the-post)	Closed list	1.95	No special name	605
Italy	Italian Parliament	Senate	205	5 (Note: Senators appointed by the president and former presidents sit for life.)	3%	200 seats: Parallel voting with mixed single vote (126 largest remainder (Note: 122 within Italy and 4 by Italian citizens overseas) / 74 first-past-the-post); Up to 5 seats: Appointed by the president Currently 0: Former presidents ex officio	Closed list	1.95	No special name	605
Latvia	Saeima		100	4	5%	Party-list PR (Sainte-Laguë)	Open list	—N/a		100
Lithuania	Seimas		141	4	5% (Note: For single parties; the threshold is 7% for coalitions. Does not apply if parties that pass the threshold receive less than 60% of the vote in total)	Parallel voting (70 largest remainder / 71 two-round system)	Open list	—N/a		141
Luxembourg	Chamber of Deputies		60	4	—	Party-list PR (Hagenbach-Bischoff)	Panachage	—N/a		60
Malta	Parliament	House of Representatives	67	5	N/A	Single transferable vote		—N/a		67
Netherlands	States General	House of Representatives	150	4	0.67%	Party-list PR (D'Hondt)	Open list	2.00	Verenigde Vergadering	225
Netherlands	States General	Senate	75	4	1.33%	Party-list PR (D'Hondt); Indirect election by provincial councils (Note: Votes are weighted by the population of each province.)	Open list	2.00	Verenigde Vergadering	225
Poland	Parliament	Sejm	460	4	5% (Note: For single parties; the threshold is 8% for coalitions. Minority parties are exempt.)	Party-list PR (D'Hondt)	Open list	4.60	National Assembly	560
Poland	Parliament	Senate	100	4	N/A	First-past-the-post		4.60	National Assembly	560
Portugal	Assembly of the Republic		230	4	—	Party-list PR (D'Hondt)	Closed list	—N/a		230
Romania	Parliament	Chamber of Deputies	330	4	5% (Note: Parties which represent minorities or which obtain at least 20% in at least four constituencies are exempt.)	Party-list PR (D'Hondt)	Closed list	2.43	No special name	466
Romania	Parliament	Senate	136	4	5%	Party-list PR (D'Hondt)	Closed list	2.43	No special name	466
Slovakia	National Council of the Slovak Republic		150	4	5% (Note: For single parties; the threshold is 7% for coalitions of two or three parties and 10% for coalitions of four or more parties.)	Party-list PR (Hagenbach-Bischoff)	Open list	—N/a		150
Slovenia	Slovenian Parliament	National Assembly	90	4	4%	88 seats: Party-list PR (largest remainder) (Note: For constituencies; the D'Hondt method is used to assign leveling seats.); 2 seats: (Note: One elected by the Italian minority and one by the Hungarian minority) Borda count	Open list	2.25	No joint conventions	130
Slovenia	Slovenian Parliament	National Council	40	5	N/A	First-past-the-post; Indirect election by local councils (22 seats) and functional constituencies (18 seats)		2.25	No joint conventions	130
Spain	Cortes Generales	Congress of Deputies	350	4	3%	Party-list PR (D'Hondt)	Closed list	1.64	No special name	613
Spain	Cortes Generales	Senate	263	4	N/A	208 seats: Partial block voting 57 seats: Appointment by regional legislatures		1.64	No special name	613
Sweden	Riksdag		349	4	4% (Note: Parties which obtain at least 12% of the vote in a given constituency will always receive seats for that constituency, even if they do not pass the threshold.)	Party-list PR (Sainte-Laguë)	Open list	—N/a		349

== See also ==
- European Parliament
- Member of the European Parliament
- List of legislatures by country
