= Free trade agreements of New Zealand =

New Zealand Free trade agreements in force Free trade agreements concluded but not in force

New Zealand is party to 14 free trade agreements (FTAs) worldwide. Together they accounted for over 70% of New Zealand's trade in 2023.

== History ==
Prior to the mid-twentieth century, New Zealand's trade was dominated by the United Kingdom which provided preferential trade quotas to her former colony. As the United Kingdom attempted to join the European Economic Community in the 1960s and move away from trade with former colonies, New Zealand sought to diversify international trade. Following this, New Zealand signed its first bilateral free trade agreement in 1965 with the New Zealand-Australia Free Trade Agreement (NAFTA) (later superseded by Closer Economic Relations in 1983). When the United Kingdom eventually joined the European Economic Community in 1973, exceptions for New Zealand allowed the United Kingdom's preferential trade offerings to be phased out until the 1990s.

Economic liberalisation in the 1970s made New Zealand into a market economy dependent on international trade especially in tourism and agricultural sectors. New Zealand has since welcomed foreign investment and has been praised as one of the most business-friendly countries in the world.

Since the 1990s, New Zealand has pursued free trade agreements as part of international trade policy with a goal (as of 2024) of 90% of exports covered by FTAs by 2030. New Zealand signed bilateral free trade agreements throughout the Asia-Pacific region through the 2000s including with significant trading partners China and the ASEAN bloc. Free trade agreements have expanded in the 2010s and 2020s with New Zealand's participation in wide multilateral FTAs including the Comprehensive and Progressive Agreement for Trans-Pacific Partnership and the Regional Comprehensive Economic Partnership.

== Free trade agreements in force ==
New Zealand has bilateral and multilateral free trade agreements with the following blocs and countries:

=== Bilateral agreements ===
==== Closer Economic Relations (1983) ====
The Australia–New Zealand Closer Economic Relations Trade Agreement, commonly known as Closer Economic Relations (CER), is a free trade agreement between Australia and New Zealand. It came into force on 1 January 1983, but the actual treaty was not signed until 28 March 1983 by the Deputy Prime Minister of Australia and Minister for Trade, Lionel Bowen and the New Zealand High Commissioner to Australia, Laurie Francis in Canberra, Australia. This was because Malcolm Fraser and Robert Muldoon hated each other personally to such an extent that they refused to ratify the agreement if the other was there.

==== New Zealand and Singapore Closer Economic Partnership (2001) ====
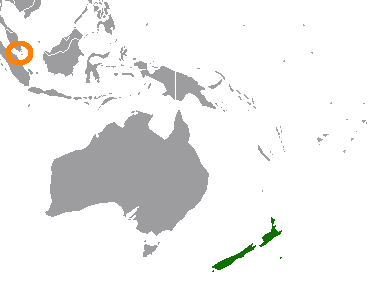
parties to the agreement

The Agreement between New Zealand and Singapore on a Closer Economic Partnership (CEP) entered into force on 1 January 2001. It is the most comprehensive trading agreement that New Zealand has negotiated, with the exception of the Closer Economic Relations agreement with Australia. The CEP aims to build on the close historical ties between Singapore and New Zealand by improving opportunities for trade in goods, services and investment.

In September 1999, New Zealand and Singapore announced intentions to negotiate a trade agreement. The agreement was led by Philip Lewin on the New Zealand side.

New Zealand PM Helen Clark and PM Goh Chok Tong signed the Agreement between New Zealand and Singapore on a Closer Economic Partnership (ANZSCEP), in a signing ceremony held on 14 November 2000 in Singapore. Singapore hosted the 1st Ministerial Review of the Agreement in November 2001, while New Zealand hosted the 2nd Ministerial Review of the Agreement in July 2004.

The CEP is comprehensive, covering goods, services, investment and technical and hygiene/quarantine barriers to trade in goods.

Over the 2 years since the agreement came into effect, Singapore's bilateral trade with New Zealand rose from $0.97 billion (2000) to S$1.09 billion (2002), an increase of 12.6%.

Beyond providing improved market access, the ANZSCEP also brings economic cooperation between Singapore and New Zealand to new heights. In 2002, New Zealand set up her first overseas technology center in Singapore to support New Zealand companies in commercializing technologies and internationalizing business.

==== NZ-Thailand Closer Economic Partnership (2005) ====
- Thailand: New Zealand and Thailand Closer Economic Partnership (2005)

==== New Zealand–China Free Trade Agreement (2008) ====
The New Zealand–China Free Trade Agreement is a bilateral free trade agreement signed between the People's Republic of China and New Zealand in April 2008. It is the first free trade agreement that China has signed with any developed country, and New Zealand's largest trade deal since the 1983 Closer Economic Relations agreement with Australia. The New Zealand-China FTA was signed on 7 April 2008 in Beijing, after negotiations that spanned fifteen rounds over three years. It entered into force on 1 October 2008, after ratification by the New Zealand Parliament. The provisions of the agreement are expected to be phased in gradually over 12 years, fully coming into force in 2019. (2008)

==== Malaysia–New Zealand Free Trade Agreement (2009) ====
The Malaysia–New Zealand Free Trade Agreement was signed on 26 October 2009 in Kuala Lumpur.

Malaysia is New Zealand's eighth-largest export destination, reaching almost 8 billion dollars' worth of exports in 2008. It was ratified by the Parliament of New Zealand on 24 June 2010 and entered into force on 1 August 2010.

==== Hong Kong–New Zealand Closer Economic Partnership Agreement (2011) ====
The Hong Kong – New Zealand Closer Economic Partnership Agreement is a bilateral free trade agreement signed between the Hong Kong Special Administrative Region of China and New Zealand in March 2010. It is the first bilateral free trade agreement on goods and services that Hong Kong SAR has signed with a foreign country. Hong Kong-New Zealand CEPA complements New Zealand's Free Trade Agreement (FTA) with China two years before, and enhances the potential for Hong Kong to be used as a platform for trade into the Mainland China. Hong Kong is a Special Administrative Region of China but has autonomy in matters of trade.

The Hong Kong-New Zealand CEPA was signed on 29 March 2010 in Hong Kong, after negotiations that spanned eight years. Prime Minister John Key of New Zealand and Hong Kong Chief Executive Donald Tsang, announced the successful conclusion of the HK-NZ CEP negotiations at the APEC Leaders meeting in Singapore in November 2009. It entered into force on 1 January 2011, after received royal assent on 31 August 2010 in New Zealand.

==== ANZTEC (2013) ====
- Taiwan: Agreement between New Zealand and the Separate Customs Territory of Taiwan, Penghu, Kinmen, and Matsu on Economic Cooperation (2013)

==== NZ-Korea Free Trade Agreement (2015) ====
South Korea is New Zealand's seventh-largest trading partner, with bilateral trade between the two countries in 2017-18 valued at NZ$4.75 billion (approximately ₩3.73 trillion). New Zealand's main exports to South Korea are wood, dairy products, meat, and aluminium. South Korea's main exports to New Zealand are petroleum, vehicles, machinery, iron and steel, and plastic.

==== New Zealand–United Kingdom Free Trade Agreement (2023) ====
The New Zealand–United Kingdom free trade agreement (NZUKFTA) was signed on 28 February 2022. The broad terms of the agreement were concluded on 20 October 2021. It was the second trade agreement signed by Britain since leaving the European Union that was negotiated completely anew.

==== New Zealand-European Union Free Trade Agreement (2024) ====
On 29 October 2015, New Zealand and the European Union concluded a Partnership Agreement on Relations and Cooperation to begin work on developing a free trade agreement. In February 2016, the European Parliament adopted a resolution on initiating free trade negotiations with both New Zealand and Australia. In April 2018, New Zealand Prime Minister Jacinda Ardern lobbied for a free trade agreement with the European Union and received the backing of French President Emmanuel Macron.

On 1 July 2022, both parties concluded negotiations for a free trade agreement. Under the terms of the agreement, all tariffs on European Union exports to New Zealand including agricultural and food products would be lifted. In return, duties would be lifted on 97% of New Zealand exports to the European Union; with over 91% being removed on the day that the free trade agreement comes into effect. In addition, tariffs were eliminated for most New Zealand horticultural products (including kiwifruits, wine, onions, apples, mānuka honey), all manufactured goods, and most seafood products. The free trade agreement would then be submitted to the European Commission, Council of the European Union, and European Parliament for approval. While New Zealand cheese producers would be able to continue using the names gouda, mozzarella, haloumi, brie and camembert for their products, the use of the name feta would be limited to Greek producers. As a result, New Zealand feta manufacturers would have to find a new name within nine years.

On 9 July 2023, Prime Minister Chris Hipkins and President of the European Commission Ursula von der Leyen formally signed the New Zealand-European Union free trade agreement in Brussels. While the FTA still awaited ratification by the European Parliament, farmers and some political groups in the European Parliament opposed the free trade agreement, however, European Union Ambassador to New Zealand Nina Obermaier confirmed that the 27 EU member states had consented to the FTA.

On 23 November 2023, the European Parliament voted to ratify the NZ-EU free trade agreement by a majority of 524 votes. Trade Minister Damien O'Connor welcomed the ratification of the free trade agreement as "an important step towards the agreement entering into force."

On 1 May 2024, the NZ-EU free trade agreement came into force, lifting 91% of tariffs on New Zealand exports to the European Union. This will rise to 97% after seven years.

On 30 September 2026, the Dutch environmentalist group Both ENDS filed a complaint against New Zealand through the European Commission's "Single Entry Point" mechanism for allegedly breaching the climate change provisions of the EU–NZ free trade agreement. Both ENDs contended that the National-led coalition government had breached these provisions by lacking a credible plan to meet climate targets, weakened methane targets, removed agriculture from carbon pricing, overturned the gas and oil exploration ban, invested in gas and a planned LNG facility, and passed legislation preventing climate-related lawsuits against major emitters. The group's complaint was supported by several New Zealand groups and individuals including Greenpeace New Zealand, the Environmental Law Initiative, Mike Smith and University of Auckland law Professor Jane Kelsey. In response, NZ Trade Minister Todd McClay defended the New Zealand government's climate change policies, saying it was "not for overseas countries, organisations or lobby groups to tell New Zealand how to meet its obligations". Similarly, NZ Prime Minister Christopher Luxon contended that New Zealand was complying with its international and trade obligations.

==== NZ-UAE Comprehensive Economic Partnership Agreement (2025) ====
- United Arab Emirates: New Zealand–United Arab Emirates Comprehensive Economic Partnership Agreement (NZ-UAE CEPA) (2025)

==== New Zealand–India Free Trade Agreement ====
In 2008, New Zealand and India commenced negotiations on a free trade agreement. Following years of negotiation, the two states signed a free trade agreement on 27 April 2026. On 17 September 2026, the New Zealand Parliament passed legislation implementing the free trade agreement. On 21 September, the two governments formally ratified the New Zealand-India free trade agreement, which came into effect on 20 October 2026.

=== Multilateral agreements ===
==== Trans-Pacific Strategic Economic Partnership (TPSEP) (2005) ====
The Trans-Pacific Strategic Economic Partnership Agreement (TPSEP), also known as P4, is a trade agreement between four Pacific Rim countries concerning a variety of matters of economic policy. The agreement was signed by Brunei, Chile, Singapore and New Zealand in 2005 and entered into force in 2006. It is a comprehensive trade agreement, affecting trade in goods, rules of origin, trade remedies, sanitary and phytosanitary measures, technical barriers to trade, trade in services, intellectual property, government procurement and competition policy. Among other things, it called for reduction by 90 percent of all tariffs between member countries by 1 January 2006, and reduction of all trade tariffs to zero by the year 2015.

- ASEAN Australia NZ FTA (2009), with:
  - Association of Southeast Asian Nations
  - Australia
- Comprehensive and Progressive Agreement for Trans-Pacific Partnership (CPTPP) (2018), with:
  - Australia
  - Brunei
  - Canada
  - Chile
  - Japan
  - Malaysia
  - Mexico
  - Peru
  - Singapore
  - United Kingdom (2024)
  - Vietnam
- PACER Plus (2020), with:
  - Australia
  - Cook Islands
  - Kiribati
  - Niue
  - Samoa
  - Solomon Islands
  - Tonga
  - Tuvalu
  - Vanuatu
- Regional Comprehensive Economic Partnership (RCEP) (2022), with:
  - Australia
  - Brunei
  - Cambodia
  - China
  - Japan
  - South Korea
  - Laos
  - Thailand
  - Malaysia
  - Singapore
  - Vietnam

== Agreements not yet in force ==
- Agreement on Climate Change, Trade and Sustainability (ACCTS), negotiations concluded in 2024 but have not yet been signed, with:
  - Costa Rica
  - Iceland
  - India
  - Switzerland
- Gulf Cooperation Council: Negotiations began in 2007 and concluded in 2009 but never signed. Agreed to resume negotiating in 2022. Signed in October 2024.

== Free trade agreements under negotiation ==
New Zealand is negotiating bilateral and multilateral free trade agreements with the following blocs and countries:

- Pacific Alliance: Free trade agreement negotiating since 2017.
- Indo-Pacific Economic Framework for Prosperity, under negotiation since 2021 with:
  - Australia
  - Brunei
  - Fiji
  - India
  - Indonesia
  - Japan
  - South Korea
  - Malaysia
  - Philippines
  - Singapore
  - Thailand
  - United States
  - Vietnam

== Abandoned or superseded proposals ==
- Trans-Pacific Partnership (TPP): signed and ratified but never entered into force, superseded by the Comprehensive and Progressive Agreement for Trans-Pacific Partnership.
- Japan: Conducted a feasibility study in 2008. Superseded as Japan joined the Comprehensive and Progressive Agreement for Trans-Pacific Partnership.
- Mercosur: New Zealand-Mercosur Free Trade Agreement. Negotiations began in 2010 and ended without a deal before 2024.
- Russia, Belarus and Kazakhstan: Russia-Kazakhstan-Belarus Free Trade Agreement – negotiations began in 2010 and were later suspended.
- United States: New Zealand–United States Free Trade Agreement. Negotiations began in 2008 but were ended in favour of the Trans-Pacific Partnership (which the United States would withdraw from).

== See also ==
- List of the largest trading partners of New Zealand
- Economy of New Zealand
- Free trade agreements of Australia
- Free trade agreements of the United Kingdom
- Free trade agreements of the United States
