= Commonwealth free trade =

Removal of trade barriers between member states of the Commonwealth of Nations

Commonwealth free trade refers to the process or proposal of eliminating trade barriers among member states of the Commonwealth of Nations. The idea has roots in the legacy of Imperial Preference, a system that fostered intra-Empire trade throughout the British Empire. Although that system declined following World War II and the United Kingdom's entry into the European Economic Community, the principle of promoting trade among Commonwealth partners never disappeared. The notion of shared language, legal systems, and institutional frameworks has long made Commonwealth trade cooperation both natural and mutually beneficial.

Since the late twentieth century, there has been renewed interest in building stronger economic ties across the Commonwealth in response to global economic shifts and changing patterns of trade. Most Commonwealth states are already active in regional groupings such as the European Union, Caribbean Community, Southern African Customs Union, East African Community, and South Asian Association for Regional Cooperation. Yet the Commonwealth as a whole remains a promising platform for cooperation. At the 2005 Commonwealth Summit in Malta, leaders endorsed greater trade between member states as a means to support economic development, especially by enabling the poorest members to access larger markets on a duty-free and quota-free basis. There was also support for strengthening dialogue and collaboration on trade policy and economic strategy.

The concept of a Commonwealth-wide free trade area has gained particular momentum in Britain since the EU membership referendum, with Brexit encouraging fresh thinking on Britain's global economic partnerships. Advocates argue that re-engaging with Commonwealth countries represents both a return to historic ties and a forward-looking approach in a more multipolar world. Trade with Commonwealth partners is already significant, and post-Brexit Britain has actively pursued agreements with several members, seeing the Commonwealth as a community of shared values, longstanding relationships and untapped economic potential.

== History ==
=== High Imperialism ===
Throughout the 17th, 18th and 19th centuries, Britain exercised an informal trade system with her colonies and self-governing dominions.

=== Last years of empire ===
During the early 20th century, several political figures in Britain, led by Joseph Chamberlain, argued for a policy of Imperial Preference – both to promote unity within the British Empire, and to assure Britain's position as a world power. The policy was controversial as it pitted proponents of Imperial trade with those who sought a general policy of trade liberalisation with all nations.

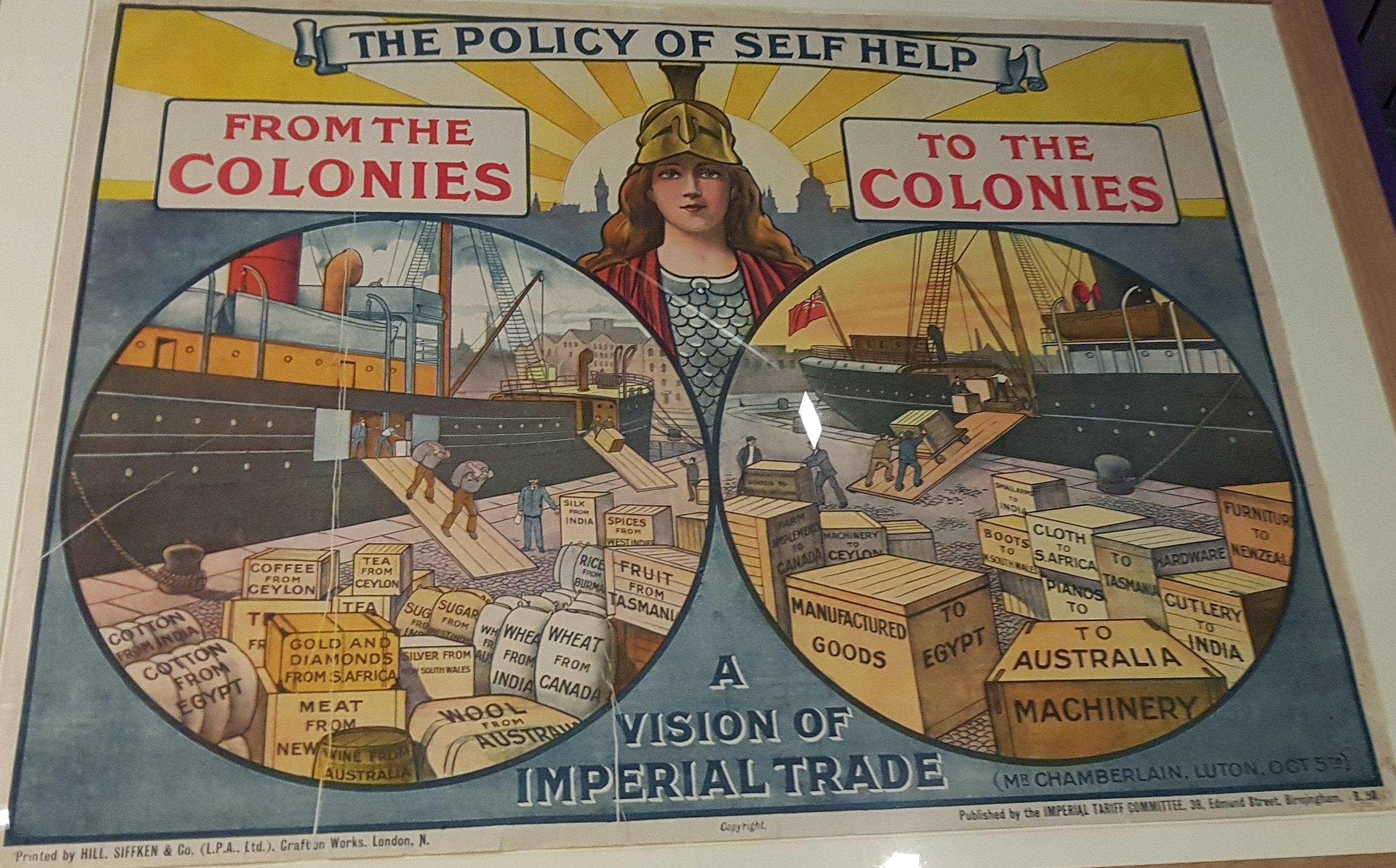
Vision of Imperial Trade

The schism helped contribute to the defeat of Prime Minister Arthur Balfour and his Conservative-Unionist government in the 1906 general election, and had serious ramifications for Conservative prospects in the 1923 and 1929 general elections. One notable victory had been the establishment of the Empire Marketing Board in 1926, which encouraged Britons to 'Buy Empire'.

In 1930, Oswald Mosley and several junior ministers in the Labour government issued the Mosley Memorandum proposing a reform of the British Empire and its Dominions into an autarkic trade bloc, alongside extensive public works programs funded by high loans and better pensions to reverse interwar unemployment and poverty. The Memorandum was rejected by the Cabinet under Prime Minister Ramsay MacDonald and Chancellor of the Exchequer Philip Snowden on grounds of cost and deficit, and was also rejected by the Parliamentary Labour Party and the National Executive Committee. Mosley subsequently departed the Labour Party to form the New Party, and later became the founder of the British Union of Fascists.

=== Depression and Ottawa Conference ===
In 1933, in the midst of the Great Depression, representatives of Britain, the Dominions, and the Colonies met in Ottawa, Canada, to hold the Commonwealth Conference on Economic Consultation and Co-operation. There had been an initial agreement on Imperial Preference, but a comprehensive agreement failed to materialise. Many of the Dominion leaders attributed this to the attitude of the British Dominions Secretary J. H. Thomas during the negotiations.

In 1935, the Canadian Prime Minister, R. B. Bennett, a Conservative who endorsed Imperial Preference, was replaced by a Liberal, William Lyon Mackenzie King. King responded to pressure from U.S. Secretary of State Cordell Hull and abandoned Imperial Preference.

In the case of the Commonwealth, the United States was hostile to it from its inception, notwithstanding the fact that in the cases of Canada, Australia, New Zealand and South Africa, there was an overwhelming preference for a trade system based on the United Kingdom rather than the U.S.

=== Post-war ===
The conclusion of World War II drastically affected the prospects for an agreement Commonwealth trade. The United States emerged as the foremost political and economic power, and its policy was to promote generalised free trade, primarily through the General Agreement on Tariffs and Trade (GATT). The United Nations Monetary and Financial Conference, held in Bretton Woods, New Hampshire, in 1944, had also created a direct link between the value of gold and the United States dollar, thereby establishing it as the world's reserve fiat currency under the Bretton Woods system.

The war had also left Britain heavily indebted, economically weakened, and unable to absorb the flow of exports from Commonwealth jurisdictions. The Dominions, primarily Canada, directed their trade more heavily to the US market as a consequence.

The idea of enhanced trade between Canada and Britain was explored in the mid-1950s by the Conservative government of Prime Minister John G. Diefenbaker. The plan, in response to the Canadian government's concern with over-reliance on the United States, was to adopt policies that would see up to 15 per cent of Canada's US exports diverted to the UK. Representatives for both Diefenbaker and British Prime Minister Harold Macmillan held exploratory talks, but no agreement was ever reached.

=== British entry into the EEC ===
Britain's entry into the European Economic Community (EEC) in 1973, and its evolution as a member state of the European Union (EU) had meant that for practical purposes, the United Kingdom could not independently enter into negotiations with Commonwealth states to establish a free trade agreement. In accordance the Articles of the European Union, the Union acted as representative of all its members, collectively. However, subsequent to the 23 June 2016 referendum and the eventual departure of Britain from the EU, Britain has become responsible for all of its own negotiations on international trade.

=== The Commonwealth Effect ===
The 1997 Commonwealth Heads of Government Meeting (CHOGM) at Edinburgh was presented with research conducted by Drs. Sarianna Lundan and Geoffrey Jones, and commissioned by the Commonwealth Secretariat. The paper, entitled "The 'Commonwealth Effect' and the Process of Internationalisation", measured whether or not Commonwealth jurisdictions enjoyed a qualitative advantage in trade with one another as opposed to equivalent non-Commonwealth nations. Their research found that even in the absence of trade treaties, there was a clear cost advantage in trade between Commonwealth nations, and that the overhead costs of doing business were reduced by up to 15 per cent in comparison to trade outside the Commonwealth.

=== Commonwealth Advantage ===
The Commonwealth Advantage program was a shared initiative between the Toronto Branch of the Royal Commonwealth Society, and the Canadian Advanced Technology Alliance (CATA) which ran from 2004 until 2008. Chaired by the Hon. Sinclair Stevens, a former Canadian International Trade Minister, the campaign was focused on developing strategic partnerships between Commonwealth-based companies.

=== CHOGM 2005 – Malta ===
In response to the lack of progress achieved in the Doha round of trade liberalisation negotiations in the World Trade Organization, Commonwealth Heads of Government, at their 2005 Summit in Malta, endorsed the idea of pursuing trade agreements among Commonwealth member states.

=== After Brexit ===
Since declaring its intention to withdraw from the European Union, the United Kingdom has begun to quickly negotiate successor agreements with dozens of countries and blocs, including many Commonwealth members. Completed agreements include those with CARIFORUM, Fiji and Papua New Guinea, (March 2019) Southern African Customs Union and Mozambique (October 2019), Kenya (November 2020) and Australia (December 2021).

== Commonwealth free trade as policy ==
Because of their very different economic profiles, Commonwealth countries' interests are not always aligned. In principle, resource exporters such as Canada, Australia, and most of the Caribbean and African Commonwealth countries are complementary to resource importers such as the United Kingdom and India. However, the historical trade ties between them were based on terms that were dictated by the Colonial Office in Britain. Since the former dominions and colonies have achieved independence, they are free to refuse British initiatives and seek better deals elsewhere. Specifically, agricultural exporters in the Cairns Group (including members Australia, Canada, New Zealand, Pakistan, and South Africa) are at odds with the importing countries at the World Trade Organization. These countries pursue independent trade policies. Notably Australia (2005) and Canada (1988), and Singapore (2004) have free trade agreements with the United States, and New Zealand (2008) has one with China. Meanwhile, New Zealand and Singapore are already members of the Trans-Pacific Strategic Economic Partnership, which Australia, Canada and Malaysia are attempting to join (along with major non-Commonwealth countries). Furthermore, the proposed Comprehensive Economic Partnership for East Asia would include Malaysia, Singapore, Brunei, India, Australia and New Zealand.

=== Canada ===
Commonwealth trade, as such, has not been a notable policy position in Canada since the failed Diefenbaker proposal of the 1950s. Instead, Canada has pursued deep economic integration with the United States on the one hand (including the Canada–United States Free Trade Agreement in 1988, the North American Free Trade Agreement in 1994, and the United States–Mexico–Canada Agreement in 2018), and a generalised diversification of trade on the other hand including the "third option" policy of the 1970 (a failed attempt to diversify Canada's trade via negotiations with Japan and the European Economic Community). This has been reinforced with a new wave of free trade agreements following NAFTA in 1994, including five Latin American countries, the European Free Trade Association and more recently the European Union, as well the failed Free Trade Area of the Americas in the early 2000s, and negotiations towards the Trans-Pacific Partnership since 2012.

In 2005, Canadian writer and political activist Brent H. Cameron wrote 'The Case for Commonwealth Free Trade', which argued the merits of establishing a trade and investment agreement that would initially combine the most developed member economies (Australia, Canada, New Zealand, Singapore) but could eventually include developing members such as India and South Africa. Cameron conceded that UK participation would be difficult with European Union (EU) membership, but suggested that it be included if Britain were to exit that agreement:

"It is proposed that a CFTA membership and expansion be conducted in four distinct phases: Phase 1 would see the creation of an initial grouping of four nations - Australia, Canada, New Zealand, and the United Kingdom. This grouping represents the most affluent and industrialized economies of the Commonwealth. Combined with stable political, judicial and social institutions, their ability to quickly integrate into a CFTA is vitally important if the organization is to have the ability to expand and succeed."

As of 2013, 75% of Canadian trade takes place with countries which Canada has a free trade agreement, but this does not include any Commonwealth members. As of 2013 Canada is currently in negotiations with the Caribbean Community (primarily Commonwealth countries), as well as India and Singapore. As of 2021 Canada has signed free trade agreements with the European Union (Malta and Cyprus are Commonwealth members). This initially included the UK but following Brexit, a deal was signed directly between Canada and the UK.

=== New Zealand ===
Winston Peters, the leader of the New Zealand First political party, called in February 2016 for a Commonwealth Free Trade Area modelled on the Closer Economic Relations Trade Agreement between Australia and New Zealand. In his comments, he suggested the inclusion of the UK, Canada, Australia and New Zealand in this area, with the possibility of adding South Africa, India, or others, referring to the putative free trade area as a 'Closer Commonwealth Economic Relations' area, or CCER. CCER was included as New Zealand government policy in the Labour-NZ First coalition agreement. As of February 2021 New Zealand has been negotiating a free trade deal with the UK, following its withdrawal from the EU's Customs Union.

=== United Kingdom ===
A map of the countries which the EU has free trade agreements with. Amongst Commonwealth countries, the EU has free trade agreements with South Africa, Cameroon, Zambia, and the 12 Commonwealth members of the Caribbean Community. European Union Agreement in force Agreement provisionally applied No agreement

==== Policy before Brexit ====
The United Kingdom had been a member of the European Union and had therefore been unable to negotiate its own trade agreements for several decades. However, after the United Kingdom formally left the European Union, it was again able to negotiate its own trade deals. While the UK had been in the EU it had actively pressured the EU to pursue trade agreements with other Commonwealth countries. In part, this resulted in the EU initiating negotiations on free trade agreements with a number of Commonwealth countries. At present, Canada and India are both in the midst of negotiating free trade agreements with the European Union. Furthermore, a number of Commonwealth countries, including South Africa, Cameroon, Zambia, and the 12 commonwealth members of the Caribbean Community, already have free trade agreements with the EU. The EU, through the Lome and Cotonou Agreements, have extended some preferential trade access to developing Commonwealth countries.

However, the idea of establishing a free trade area within the Commonwealth has garnered interest in the UK amongst politicians and parties that advocated leaving the European Union who cite the development of a Commonwealth free trade policy as an important step in reshaping the UK's trade policy. The UK Independence Party has included a call for a Commonwealth Free Trade Agreement in its policy manifesto during the 2010 British general election.

On October 8, 2012, Tim Hewish and James Styles released their paper "Common Trade, Common Wealth, Common Growth" at the UK Conservative Party Conference in Birmingham, England. The following day saw British Foreign Secretary William Hague comment upon how the Commonwealth, which had been 'neglected' by previous UK governments, presented "enormous opportunities" for the nation.

Supporters of Britain's membership of the European Union have criticised the proposal for a Commonwealth free trade area as unlikely in practice to come to fruition.

==== Policy since Brexit ====
The policy since the end of Brexit has been to maintain the integrity of a free and independent state regaining its sovereignty. It has been upon not just commonwealth free trade but also a $20 trillion United States trade deal the UK now having clearly wider interests then that of the 26 EU member states, yet Norway, Switzerland, Turkey, and Ukraine not in the EU but as European nations are of interest for trade.

== See also ==
- Economy of the United Kingdom

=== Publications ===
==== Books ====
- Roberts, Russell D. (2007). The choice: a fable of free trade and protectionism (3 ed.). Upper Saddle River, NJ: Pearson/Prentice Hall. ISBN 978-0-13-143354-0.
- Unger, Roberto Mangabeira (2007). Free trade reimagined: the world division of labor and the method of economics. Princeton: Princeton University Press. ISBN 978-0-691-14588-4.
- Hanson, Ann Aubrey; Zott, Lynn Marie, eds. (2013). Free trade. Opposing viewpoints series. Farmington Hills, Mich: Greenhaven Press. ISBN 978-0-7377-6055-2.
- Panagariya, Arvind (2019). Free trade and prosperity: how openness helps developing countries grow richer and combat poverty. New York, NY, United States of America: Oxford University Press. ISBN 978-0-19-091449-3.

==== Podcasts ====
- Wong, Wailin; Woods, Darian; Bridges, Corey; Concannon, Kate. "What's the Commonwealth good for?". THE INDICATOR FROM PLANET MONEY - npr.org. Archived from the original on 2023-05-17.

=== Links ===
- CANZUK
- Commonwealth banknote-issuing institutions
- Commonwealth Freedom of Movement Organisation
- Imperial Federation
- Imperial Preference
- List of Commonwealth of Nations countries by GDP
- List of stock exchanges in the Commonwealth of Nations
