= Free trade agreements of Australia =

Australia Free trade agreements in force

Australia is party to 18 free trade agreements (FTAs) worldwide covering 30 economies.

== History ==
=== Post-War Era (1940s–1960s) ===
Australia was a founding member of the General Agreement on Tariffs and Trade (GATT) in 1947, which aimed to promote international trade by reducing tariffs and other trade barriers. The focus during this period was primarily on multilateral trade negotiations rather than bilateral agreements.

=== Bilateral Agreements (1980s–1990s) ===
The Australia-New Zealand Closer Economic Relations Trade Agreement (ANZCERTA), signed in 1983, marked a significant step towards bilateral trade agreements, creating a single economic market between the two nations. The 1990s saw Australia engaging in further bilateral agreements, including those with countries in the Asia-Pacific region.

=== Asia-Pacific Focus (2000s) ===
The Australia-Singapore Free Trade Agreement (ASFTA) was signed in 2003, followed by agreements with Thailand and the United States (Australia-United States Free Trade Agreement, AUSFTA) in 2005. These agreements aimed to strengthen economic ties and promote trade in goods and services.

=== Regional Agreements (2010s) ===
The ASEAN-Australia-New Zealand Free Trade Area (AANZFTA), effective in 2010, expanded trade relations with Southeast Asian countries. In 2018, Australia became a signatory to the Comprehensive and Progressive Agreement for Trans-Pacific Partnership (CPTPP), which includes several key economies in the Asia-Pacific region.

== Free trade agreements in force ==
Australia has bilateral and multilateral free trade agreements with the following blocs and countries:

=== Bilateral agreements ===
- New Zealand: Closer Economic Relations (1983)
- Singapore: Singapore-Australia Free Trade Agreement (SAFTA) (2003)
- United States: Australia–United States Free Trade Agreement (AUSFTA) (2005)
- Thailand: Thailand-Australia Free Trade Agreement (TAFTA) (2005)
- Chile: Australia–Chile Free Trade Agreement (ACl-FTA) (2009)
- Malaysia: Malaysia-Australia Free Trade Agreement (MAFTA) (2013)
- South Korea: Australia–Korea Free Trade Agreement (KAFTA) (2014)
- Japan: Japan–Australia Economic Partnership Agreement (JAEPA) (2015)
- China: China–Australia Free Trade Agreement (ChAFTA) (2015)
- Hong Kong: Australia-Hong Kong Free Trade Agreement (A-HKFTA) (2020)
- Peru: Peru-Australia Free Trade Agreement (PAFTA) (2020)
- Indonesia: Indonesia–Australia Comprehensive Economic Partnership Agreement (IA-CEPA) (2020)
- India: Australia–India Comprehensive Economic Cooperation Agreement (CECA) (2022)
- United Kingdom: Australia–United Kingdom Free Trade Agreement (A-UKFTA) (2023)
- United Arab Emirates: Australia–UAE Comprehensive Economic Partnership Agreement (CEPA) (2025)

=== Multilateral agreements ===
- ASEAN Australia NZ FTA (2009), with:
  - ASEAN
  - New Zealand
- Comprehensive and Progressive Agreement for Trans-Pacific Partnership (CPTPP) (2018), with:
  - Brunei
  - Canada
  - Chile
  - Japan
  - Malaysia
  - Mexico
  - New Zealand
  - Peru
  - Singapore
  - United Kingdom (2024)
  - Vietnam
- PACER Plus (2020), with:
  - Cook Islands
  - Kiribati
  - New Zealand
  - Niue
  - Samoa
  - Solomon Islands
  - Tonga
  - Tuvalu
  - Vanuatu
- Regional Comprehensive Economic Partnership (RCEP) (2022), with:
  - Brunei
  - Cambodia
  - China
  - Japan
  - New Zealand
  - South Korea
  - Laos
  - Thailand
  - Malaysia
  - Singapore
  - Vietnam

== Free trade agreements under negotiation ==
- European Union: Australia-European Union Free Trade Agreement, entered negotiations in 2019, suspended in 2023 and concluded on 24 March 2026.

== See also ==
- List of the largest trading partners of Australia
- Economy of Australia
- Free trade agreements of New Zealand
- Free trade agreements of the United Kingdom
- Free trade agreements of the United States
