= Hong Kong–New Zealand Closer Economic Partnership Agreement =

The Hong Kong – New Zealand Closer Economic Partnership Agreement is a bilateral free trade agreement signed between the Hong Kong Special Administrative Region of China and New Zealand in March 2010. It is the first bilateral free trade agreement on goods and services that Hong Kong SAR has signed with a foreign country. Hong Kong-New Zealand CEPA complements New Zealand's Free Trade Agreement (FTA) with China two years before, and enhances the potential for Hong Kong to be used as a platform for trade into the Mainland China. Hong Kong is a Special Administrative Region of China but has autonomy in matters of trade.

The Hong Kong-New Zealand CEPA was signed on 29 March 2010 in Hong Kong, after negotiations that spanned eight years. Prime Minister John Key of New Zealand and Hong Kong Chief Executive Donald Tsang, announced the successful conclusion of the HK-NZ CEP negotiations at the APEC Leaders meeting in Singapore in November 2009. It entered into force on 1 January 2011, after received royal assent on 31 August 2010 in New Zealand.

== Agreements ==
The HK-NZ CEPA contains measures to improve business flows and promote cooperation in a broad range of economic areas of mutual interest, as bilateral tariff levels in merchandise trade are already low. The Agreement also includes significant commitments relating to services, government procurement, customs co-operation, technical barriers to trade, sanitary and phyto-sanitary measures as well as intellectual property, competition and electronic commerce.

Under the CEP agreement, New Zealand goods currently entering Hong Kong SAR at a zero tariff will be bound at that level, and remaining tariffs will be progressively reduced to mirror those in the New Zealand–China Free Trade Agreement. All tariffs for Hong Kong exports to New Zealand will be eliminated by 2016, and vice versa for New Zealand exports to Hong Kong SAR. Hong Kong and New Zealand will also work on strengthening bilateral trade and economic ties by facilitating investment and movement of business persons.

By 2012, 85.6 per cent of current imports must be tariff-free, including whiteware, steel, plastics, furniture and jewellery.

By 2016, all tariffs, including those on clothing and footwear, will be removed.

HK-NZ CEPA is supported by legally-binding side agreements on Labour and Environment that are in line with New Zealand's broader objectives for sustainable development; with additional legally-binding side agreement on Investment Protocol within two years of entry into force.

== Mutual benefits ==
According to NZ Trade Minister Tim Groser recognises the continuous exports, open and liberal trading environments of both founding members of WTO help respective economic growth; and HK-NZ CEPA "is a model of how economies can address barriers both at and inside their borders in order to grow trade."

=== Hong Kong ===
CEP Agreement is a new incentive to attract New Zealand enterprises to come and invest in Hong Kong, bringing with them valuable expertise and experience. According to Hong Kong Chief Executive Donald Tsang, a resource rich New Zealand could use Hong Kong as the middle man or springboard for New Zealand firms, services and technologies, into the mainland China. The deal benefits more tangibly for Hong Kong firms, who exported goods worth NZ$203 million to New Zealand in 2009, 47 per cent of which incurred tariffs. Hong Kong's annual tariff saving is estimated to be HK$7 million on the basis of average merchandise trade figures from 2006 to 2008.

Hong Kong service providers enjoy secured preferential opportunities in all New Zealand service markets, including the six industries with clear advantages that Hong Kong has; educational services, medical services, testing and certification services, environmental services, innovation and technology, cultural and creative industries.<ref="CEP-signed"></ref>

Hong Kong consumers will get increasing supplies of produces, beverages, and health supplements from New Zealand.

=== New Zealand ===
CEP Agreement allows New Zealand a further step towards deeper integration into Asia-Pacific region, as more than 70 percent of NZ's trade and investment occurs in the Asia-Pacific region. More secure and open access to the Hong Kong market for wine, organics and other foods, will help New Zealand to capitalise upon new trade and investment opportunities in North Asia and China, for which HK is an important trading hub.

For bilateral trade alone, Hong Kong is New Zealand's 9th largest export destination and worth around NZ$820 million per year. A CEP with Hong Kong helps the bilateral trade and economic relationship between NZ and HK to expand. This will in turn contribute to NZ's economic development objectives. NZ exports to HK have increased significantly in recent years. In the year to June 2009, goods exports to Hong Kong were up 33.6 percent. As HK is an economy which already grants duty-free access to all imports, the CEP Agreement does not offer NZ the usual gains of reduced tariffs. However, by locking in duty-free access to the Hong Kong market, and providing mechanisms through which to address other constraints on trade, it ensures greater security of access to the Hong Kong market. The CEP Agreement with Hong Kong offers more secure and certain access to the HK market for NZ services exporters in sectors of key interest for New Zealand, including private education, business services, environmental services and logistics.

The CEP provides NZ with an "early harvest" of most of the additional liberalisation which Hong Kong has offered as part of the WTO Doha round.

While the HK-NZ CEPA enjoys the support of New Zealand's two largest political parties, Labour and National, the Greens voted against while the Māori Party has split the vote at the third reading of the Tariff (New Zealand-Hong Kong Closer Economic Partnership Agreement) Amendment Bill. An opinion by New Zealand Council of Trade Unions, worried that further foreign direct investment from Hong Kong, could benefit offshore accounts in the Cook Islands, instead of further job creation in NZ.

== See also ==
- Foreign relations of Hong Kong
- New Zealand free trade agreements
- Economy of Hong Kong
- Rules of Origin
- Market access
- Free-trade area
- Tariffs
