= Select Committee on Import Duties =

The Select Committee on Import Duties was a select committee of the House of Commons of the United Kingdom in the Parliament of the United Kingdom appointed in 1840.

== Overview ==
The Radical MP Joseph Hume, on 5 May 1840, moved for the appointment of a select committee on import duties. The Whigs consented and Hume chaired the committee, and he was able to ensure that the committee was made up of ten free traders and five protectionists. The Report of the committee consequently advised on lowering tariffs. The Report stated:

The Tariff often aims at incompatible ends; the duties are sometimes meant to be both productive of revenue and for protective objects, which are frequently inconsistent with each other; hence they sometimes operate to the complete exclusion of foreign produce, and in so far no revenue can of course be received; and sometimes, when the duty is inordinately high, the amount of revenue becomes gradually trifling.

The historian Norman Gash has claimed that the Report "had been based on singularly slender and biased evidence, and bore all the marks of a doctrinaire thesis".

== See also ==
- Commonwealth free trade

== See also ==
- Overseas Sourcing
