= CFMO =

CFMO may refer to:

- Commonwealth Freedom of Movement Organisation, non-profit international organisation
- CKKL-FM, a radio station serving Ottawa, Ontario
