= New Zealand–China Free Trade Agreement =

Bilateral free trade deal

The New Zealand–China Free Trade Agreement is a bilateral free trade agreement signed between the People's Republic of China and New Zealand in April 2008. It is the first free trade agreement that China has signed with any developed country, and New Zealand's largest trade deal since the 1983 Closer Economic Relations agreement with Australia. The New Zealand-China FTA was signed on 7 April 2008 in Beijing, after negotiations that spanned fifteen rounds over three years. It entered into force on 1 October 2008, after ratification by the New Zealand Parliament. The provisions of the agreement are expected to be phased in gradually over 12 years, fully coming into force in 2019.

== Agreements ==
Under the agreement, 37 per cent of Chinese exports to New Zealand and 35 per cent of New Zealand exports to China will be tariff free by October 2008. All tariffs for Chinese exports to New Zealand will be eliminated by 2016, and 96 per cent of New Zealand exports to China will be tariff free by 2019. Mutual investment and trade in services will also be facilitated.

The deal also allows 1,800 specialised workers to go from China to New Zealand for a period of up to three years. This, however, will be limited to approved occupations and to a maximum of 100 such workers in any sector, except for traditional Chinese medicine practitioners, Chinese chefs, and Mandarin teaching aides, which have maximums of 150 or 200. New Zealand will also establish a working holiday scheme enabling up to 1,000 young Chinese nationals annually to travel and work in New Zealand for up to 12 months. Both countries have agreed to enhance business visa conditions and processing.

== History ==
=== 2008 agreement ===
The New Zealand-China free trade agreement took over three years to negotiate. On 19 November 2004, Helen Clark and President of China, Hu Jintao announced the commencement of negotiations towards an FTA at the APEC Leaders meeting in Santiago, Chile. The first round of negotiations was held in December 2004. Fifteen rounds took place before the FTA was signed in April 2008 by New Zealand's Minister of Trade Phil Goff and the Chinese Minister of Commerce Chen Deming at the Great Hall of the People in Beijing.

The deal was welcomed by a number of New Zealand exporters including the dairy cooperative Fonterra and the New Zealand Seafood Industry Council, while others such as the appliance manufacturer Fisher & Paykel stated that the deal would lead to tougher competition with cheaper-priced Chinese products. The New Zealand Council of Trade Unions opposed the inclusion of workforce in the trade agreement stating that there is potential for skilled Chinese workers to be exploited and underpaid.

While the FTA enjoys the support of New Zealand's two largest political parties, Labour and National, the Green Party and the Māori Party opposed the agreement even before it was signed. Members of the Green Party protested against the signing of the deal, with Keith Locke saying that easier access to a cheap Chinese workforce could undermine New Zealand workers. Following the signing, New Zealand First announced that it opposed the deal. Public opinion was divided at the time; a poll published a week before the signing showed 45% supported the deal, while 32% opposed it.

=== Upgrade protocol ===
In 2014, China and New Zealand announced that they would seek an upgrade of the free trade agreement. Following nine rounds of negotiations, the negotiations for the upgrade protocol were concluded in 2019 and signed in 2020.

New provisions included making exports to China easier, improving China's commitment to environmental standards, integrating with the Regional Comprehensive Economic Partnership and giving New Zealand preferential access to the wood and paper trade with China. In return, New Zealand will ease visa restrictions for Chinese tour guides and Chinese language teachers. Tariffs were eliminated or reduced on New Zealand exports such as dairy, timber, and seafood as well as compliance costs.

Following the upgrade protocol, on 1 January 2024, tariffs were lifted on all New Zealand dairy imports including milk powder to China as part of the NZ-China free trade agreement. This development was welcomed by Minister of Trade and Agriculture Todd McClay, who estimated it would bring NZ$330 million worth of revenue to the New Zealand economy.

== See also ==
- Regional Comprehensive Economic Partnership
- China–New Zealand relations
- New Zealand free trade agreements
- History of trade for the People's Republic of China
- Rules of Origin
- Market access
- Free-trade area
