= Import sensitive product =

Product sensitive to competition from imports by foreign suppliers

An import sensitive product is a product that is particularly sensitive to competition from imports from other country suppliers. Import sensitive products generally receive longer phase-in periods for tariff reduction or elimination in trade agreements. There is no definitive list of import sensitive agricultural products in the United States, but such products as sugar, dairy, beef, citrus, winter fruits, and vegetables, among others have been identified as import sensitive. In some cases, import sensitive products have been excluded altogether from negotiated trade agreements as was sugar in the U.S.-Australia Free Trade Agreement.
