= Trans-Pacific Strategic Economic Partnership Agreement =

Trade agreement between four countries

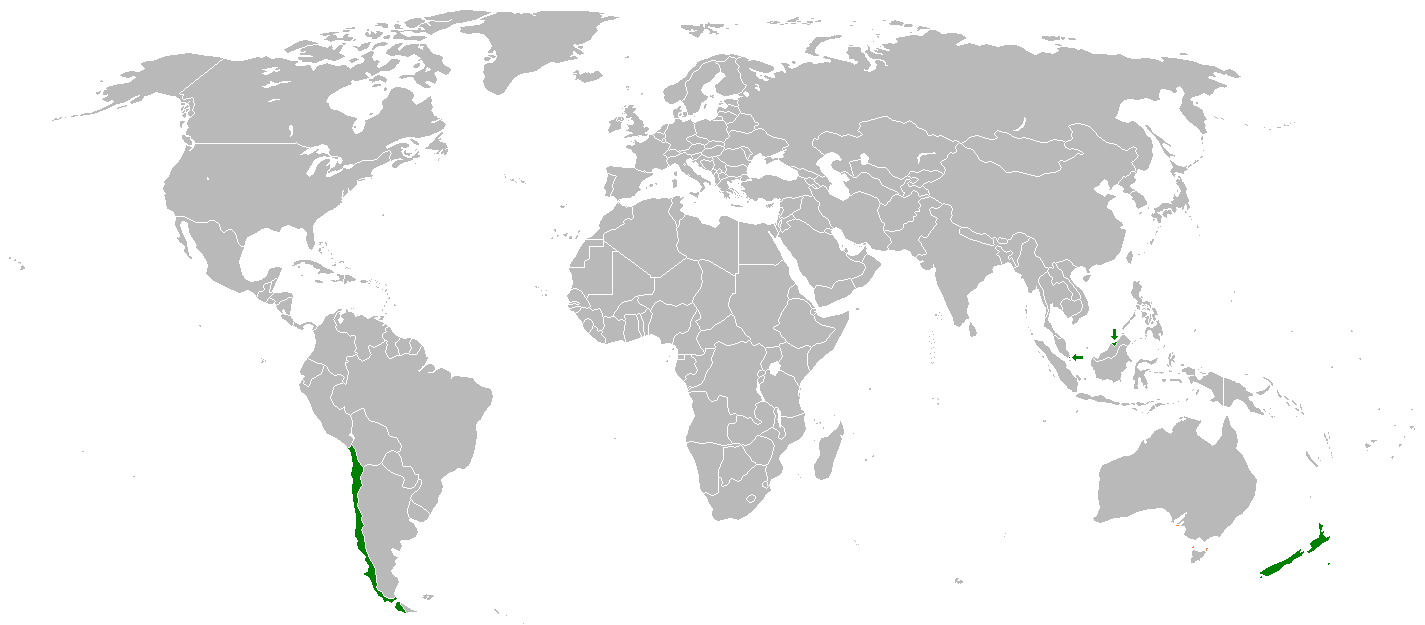
- Parties to the trade agreement
- Type: Trade agreement
- Drafted: 3 June 2005
- Signed: 18 July 2005
- Location: Wellington, New Zealand
- Effective: 28 May 2006
- Condition: 2 ratifications
- Parties: Brunei; Chile; Singapore; New Zealand
- Depositary: Government of New Zealand
- Languages: English and Spanish, in event of conflict English prevails

The Trans-Pacific Strategic Economic Partnership Agreement (TPSEP), also known as P4, is a trade agreement between four Pacific Rim countries concerning a variety of matters of economic policy. The agreement was signed by Brunei, Chile, Singapore and New Zealand in 2005 and entered into force in 2006. It is a comprehensive trade agreement, affecting trade in goods, rules of origin, trade remedies, sanitary and phytosanitary measures, technical barriers to trade, trade in services, intellectual property, government procurement and competition policy. Among other things, it called for reduction by 90 percent of all tariffs between member countries by 1 January 2006, and reduction of all trade tariffs to zero by the year 2015.

== Earlier agreements ==
By 2001, New Zealand and Singapore had concluded the Agreement between New Zealand and Singapore on a Closer Economic Partnership (NZSCEP). The Trans-Pacific Strategic Economic Partnership Agreement built on the NZSCEP.

== Negotiations ==
During the 2002 Asia-Pacific Economic Cooperation (APEC) Leaders' Meeting in Los Cabos, Mexico, Prime Ministers Helen Clark of New Zealand, Goh Chok Tong of Singapore and Chilean President Ricardo Lagos began negotiations on the Pacific Three Closer Economic Partnership (P3-CEP). According to the New Zealand Department of Foreign Affairs and Trade,

"The shared desire was to create a comprehensive, forward-looking trade agreement that set high-quality benchmarks on trade rules, and would help to promote trade liberalisation and facilitate trade within the APEC region."

— Ministry of Foreign Affairs and Trade, New Zealand 2005

Brunei first took part as a full negotiating party in April 2005 before the fifth, and final round of talks. Subsequently, the agreement was renamed to TPSEP (Trans-Pacific Strategic Economic Partnership agreement or Pacific-4). Negotiations on the Trans-Pacific Strategic Economic Partnership Agreement (TPSEP or P4) were concluded by Brunei, Chile, New Zealand and Singapore on 3 June 2005, and entered into force on 28 May 2006 for New Zealand and Singapore, 12 July 2006 for Brunei, and 8 November 2006 for Chile.

== Parties ==
Party	Signature	Entry into force	Population
Brunei	2 August 2005	29 July 2006	417,200 (175th 2015 estimate)
Chile	18 July 2005	8 November 2006	18,006,407 (62nd 2015 estimate)
New Zealand	18 July 2005	1 May 2006	5,358,030 (123rd 2017 estimate)
Singapore	18 July 2005	1 May 2006	5,607,300 (113th 2016 estimate)

Although the TPSEP agreement contains an accession clause and affirms the members' "commitment to encourage the accession to this Agreement by other economies", no such accession have taken place. All four countries were involved however in the negotiations for the Trans-Pacific Partnership Agreement, about which agreement was reached in 2015 involving eight additional parties.

The TPSEP (and the TPP it grew into) are not APEC initiatives. However, the TPP is considered to be a pathfinder for the proposed Free Trade Area of the Asia Pacific (FTAAP), an APEC initiative.

== See also ==
- Trans-Pacific Partnership – 2016 proposed trade agreement
- Pacific Alliance – Latin American trade agreement
- Rules of origin – Rules to attribute a country of origin to a product
- Market access – Ability to sell goods and services across borders
- Free trade area – Regional trade agreement
- Tariff – Goods import or export tax
