= Australia–Chile Free Trade Agreement =

The Australia–Chile Free Trade Agreement (ACLFTA) is a trade agreement between the countries of Chile and Australia. It was signed on 30 July 2008 and went into effect in the 1st quarter of 2009. The agreement was intended to go into effect on 1 January 2009, but was delayed due to Chile not being able to finish its ratification in time.

Monthly value of Australian merchandise exports to Chile (A$ millions) since 1988

Monthly value of Chilean merchandise exports to Australia (A$ millions) since 1988

Trade between Chile and Australia is modest, involving A$856m in 2007. Australia is the fourth largest provider of foreign direct investment in Chile with over A$3 billion in 2007. Chile ranks as Australia's 41st trading partner. Australia's main exports to Chile were coal (A$94 million) and civil engineering equipment (A$21 million). Trade from Chile is copper (A$96 million), and pulp and waste paper (A$57 million).

When enacted, the Agreement calls for Chile to eliminate tariffs on 91.9% of tariffs which cover 96.9% of trade from Australia. Australia will cut 90.8% of tariffs which cover 97.1% of trade from Chile. By year six of the Agreement (2015), all tariffs will be discarded except for Chile's sugar tariff which will remain subject to its current ‘price band’ system. The tariffs in Australia, that will stay in place until 2015, will be relating to textile and the clothing industry along with table grapes. In Chile, the agreement will protect the textile and clothing industry and some other manufactured products.

According to the Australian Government, the government hopes to use the Agreement as a model for other free trade agreements with other countries.

Before passage of the Agreement farmers and horticulturists protested the Agreement in front of the Australian Parliament. The protesters claim that this agreement would undercut Australian food producers by allowing in cheap food goods from Chile. Simon Crean, Australia's Minister for Trade, responded to the farmers concerns by stating that tariffs are quite low or in some cases nonexistent due to previous international trade agreements.

Chile and Australia agreed in principle to start negotiations on 8 December 2006. Negotiations started on 18 July 2007 and after four rounds of talks, concluded on 27 May 2008.

== See also ==
- Australia–Chile relations
- Australia New Zealand Closer Economic Relations Trade Agreement
- Australia-United States Free Trade Agreement
- Rules of Origin
- Market access
- Free-trade area
- Tariffs
