= Laurie Francis =

New Zealand lawyer and diplomat

Sir Laurie Francis
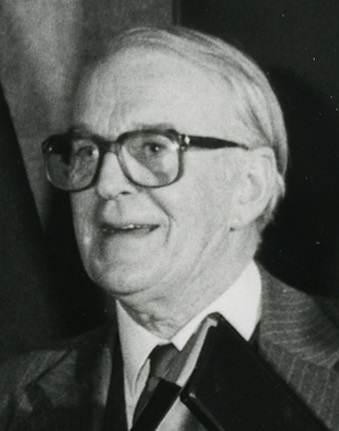

High Commissioner of New Zealand to Australia
- In office 2 August 1976 – 29 January 1985
- Preceded by: Eric Chapman
- Succeeded by: Graham Ansell

Personal details
- Born: Laurie Justice Francis; 30 August 1918; Oamaru, New Zealand
- Died: 3 August 1993 (aged 74); Wellington, New Zealand
- Spouse: Heather Margaret McFarlane (m. 1952)
- Relatives: Shona McFarlane (sister-in-law)

Sir Laurie Justice Francis (30 August 1918 – 3 August 1993) was a New Zealand lawyer and diplomat. He served as the New Zealand High Commissioner to Australia from 1976 to 1984.

== Biography ==
Born in Oamaru on 30 August 1918, Francis was educated at Otago Boys' High School and the University of Otago, where he graduated LLB in 1948. During World War II, Francis serviced with the 2nd New Zealand Expeditionary Force after enlisting in 1943. In 1952, he married artist Heather McFarlane, the sister of Shona McFarlane.

Francis worked as a lawyer in Winton, and from 1962 was a senior partner in a Dunedin law firm. He was active in the National Party, Rotary, the Returned Services' Association, and the Presbyterian church.

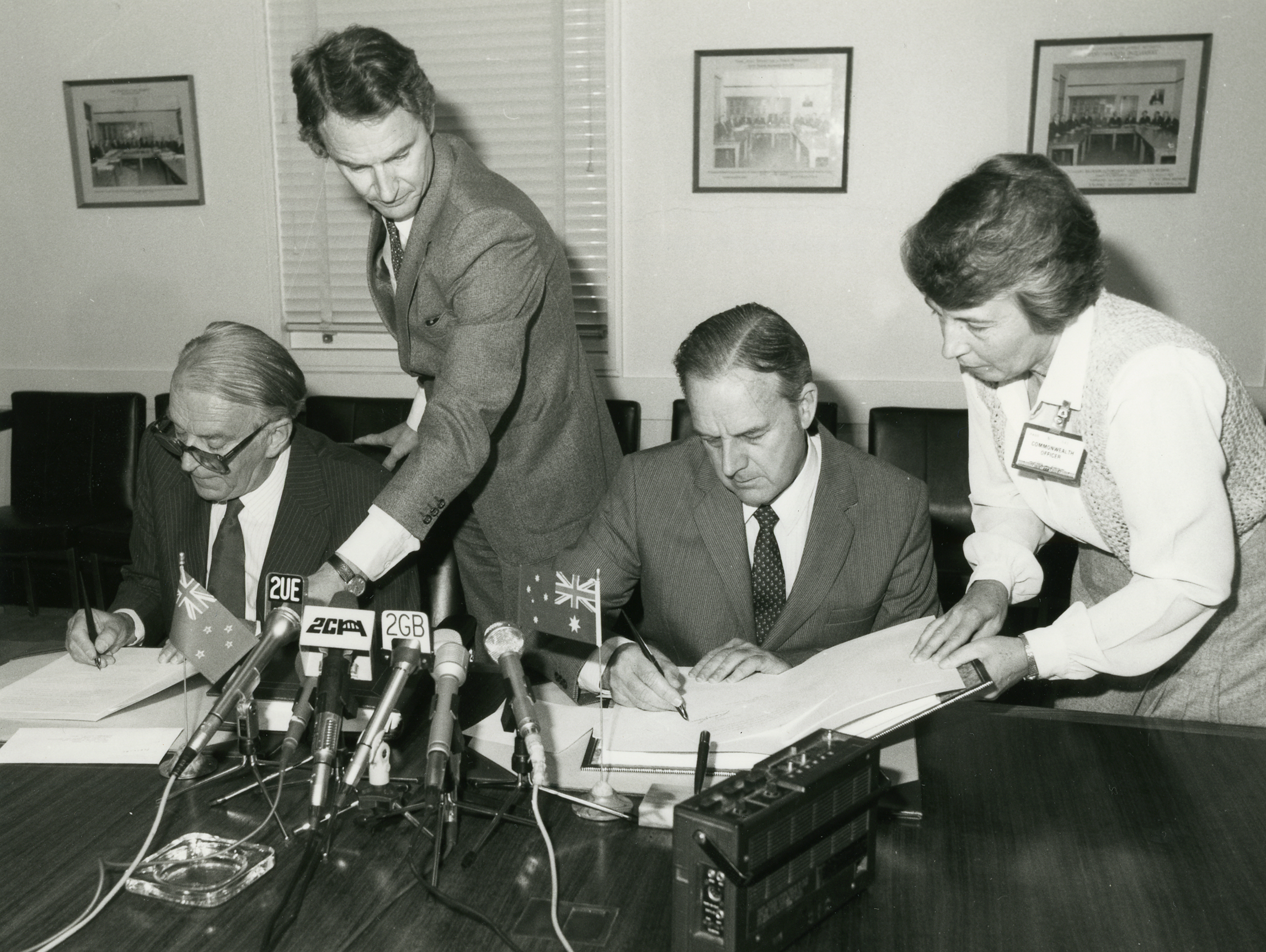
Francis (left) and Lionel Bowen sign the CER agreement in Canberra on 28 March 1983

In 1976, Francis was appointed the New Zealand High Commissioner to Australia by the Third National Government, and was involved in negotiations for the Closer Economic Relations (CER) agreement with Australia. The CER agreement was signed in Canberra by Francis and the Australian deputy prime minister, Lionel Bowen, on 28 March 1983. Francis was the dean of the diplomatic corps in Australia from 1983 to 1985 as the longest-serving diplomat there.

In the 1982 Queen's Birthday Honours, Francis was appointed a Knight Bachelor, in recognition as his contributions as the high commissioner in Australia. He resigned from the latter position in 1984, returning to Dunedin to work as a legal consultant. He died in Wellington on 3 August 1993, and his ashes were buried at Green Park Cemetery in the Dunedin suburb of Waldronville.

Diplomatic posts
Preceded by Eric Chapman	High Commissioner to Australia; 1976–1985	Succeeded by Graham Ansell
