= CANZUK International =

Non-profit international organisation

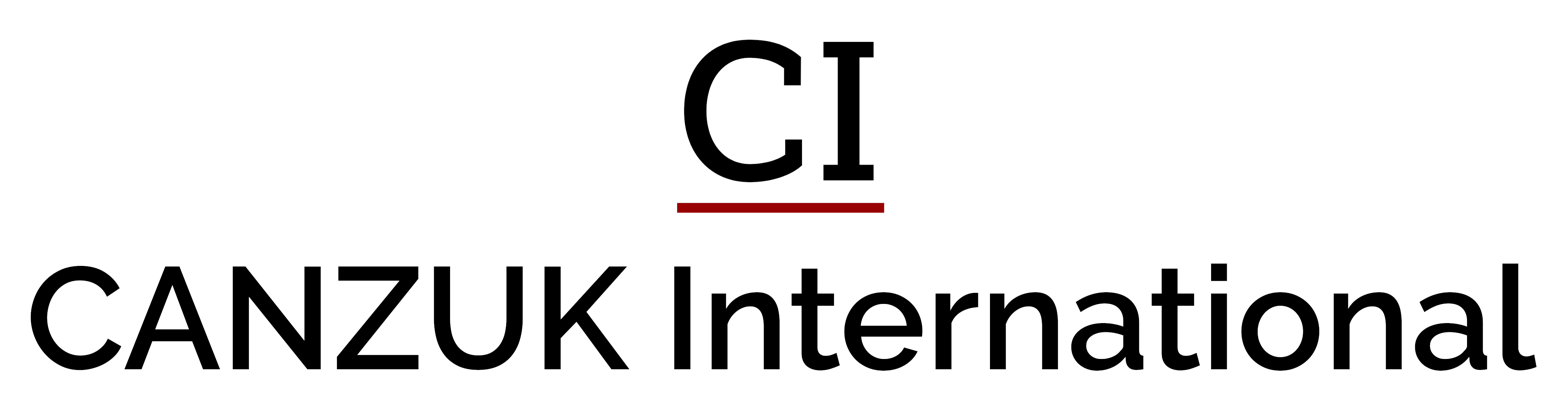
- Founded: 2015
- Founder: James Skinner
- Type: Political Organisation
- Purpose: To build a cohesive alliance of four nation-states.
- Location: Vancouver, British Columbia, Canada
- Region served: Canada, Australia, New Zealand, United Kingdom
- Key people: James Skinner (CEO); John Bender (Chairman); Joshua Thomson
- Website: canzukinternational.com
- Formerly called: Commonwealth Freedom of Movement Organisation

CANZUK International is an international advocacy organisation which aims to achieve the free movement of citizens, free trade agreements and foreign policy cooperation between Canada, Australia, New Zealand and the United Kingdom through intergovernmental action and the formation of a proposed diplomatic alliance known as CANZUK. The organisation aims to achieve similar free movement and trade arrangements that exist under the Trans-Tasman Travel Arrangement and the Closer Economic Relations trade agreement between Australia and New Zealand, with Canada and the United Kingdom eventually joining these arrangements.

== History ==
The Commonwealth Freedom of Movement Organisation (CFMO) was founded in January 2015 by executive director, James Skinner, who conceptualized and popularized the idea of developing migration, trade and foreign policy agreements between Canada, Australia, New Zealand and the United Kingdom by developing political interest for CANZUK among supportive MPs in Canada. Skinner founded the CFMO after experiencing his own difficulties immigrating to Australia and Canada as a UK citizen.

On 17 March 2015, Skinner appeared on The Early Edition with Rick Cluff as part of CBC Radio One's breakfast programming in Vancouver, where he detailed the reasoning for the CFMO's campaign regarding free movement between Canada, Australia, New Zealand and the UK:

The four countries we propose are very similar in numerous ways. For example, we share the same head of state, the same language, the same Westminster style parliamentary system, the same common law legal system, similar economic growth rates, [and a] similar respect for human rights. What we're advocating is not something out of the ordinary. This is something that has been done within the EU, between virtually 30 countries with a population of 500 million citizens, who have the right to live and work freely between each other, and it's also been done between Australia and New Zealand with the Trans-Tasman Travel Arrangement ... so what we're proposing with 4 Commonwealth countries, who have very close Commonwealth ties, is not something completely "out there".

In January 2017, the CFMO was renamed CANZUK International with greater interest in campaigning for free trade and foreign policy cooperation between the four countries in addition to freedom of movement.

== Policies ==
A map of CANZUK countries and their dependencies

CANZUK International's proposals focuses specifically on three key areas: freedom of movement, free trade and foreign policy co-operation, with interest in complimentary objectives such as constitutional affairs and educational initiatives.

=== Freedom of movement ===
The organisation has campaigned publicly for the national governments of Canada, Australia, New Zealand and the United Kingdom to remove visa restrictions and work permits between their citizens, similar to the current arrangements that exist between Australia and New Zealand. In April 2015, 7 News Australia interviewed former director, Alice Moran, in which she reiterated the organisation's stance regarding free movement:

"Those four nations are so similar to each other [and] have so much in common; we feel like we should be able to move around as freely as possible".

However, although supportive of free movement, the organisation has also drafted restrictions which may apply to citizens if free movement legislation is ratified between Canada, Australia, New Zealand and the United Kingdom. Such restrictions include prohibiting those with infectious health conditions and criminal records, similar to the terms of the current Trans-Tasman Travel Arrangement. In an interview with Dan Riendeau for the "At Night" radio show on News Talk 770 in March 2015, Skinner emphasised that any future free movement initiative would need to learn from the flaws within the European Union free movement system, and therefore, certain restrictions would likely need to be considered by the respective governments for the initiative to work effectively. This was also emphasized in an interview with Global News in January 2018, where Skinner stated that freedom of movement for citizens of each country would be "controlled" with certain health and security restrictions in place if people wanted to travel or work between the CANZUK countries. Those on a terror watch-list or with serious criminal convictions would not qualify under free movement provisions, emulating the current travel regulations between Australia and New Zealand under the Trans-Tasman Travel Arrangement.

Although CANZUK International's main objective is freedom of movement between Canada, Australia, New Zealand and the United Kingdom, the organisation has also prioritised increased visas between the countries. In an Interview with ABC News, Skinner stated "In the interim, a five-year work visa could be introduced for anyone below the age of 31...this visa could then be expanded to those below the ages of 35 or 40. Progress could then be made towards increasing the five-year work visa to seven or ten years, and then eventually to full free-movement by negotiating an accession agreement for Canada and the United Kingdom to join the Trans-Tasman Travel Agreement".

=== Free trade ===
In addition to free movement of citizens, the organisation has also called for open trade between Canada, Australia, New Zealand and the United Kingdom, claiming that such trading relations would provide the CANZUK countries with "more collective bargaining power in dealing with large trading partners such as the United States, China, India and the European Union". When speaking with Justin "Drex" Wilcomes on Corus Radio's late-night talk show The Shift with Drex in January 2018, Skinner emphasized that trade between Canada, Australia, New Zealand and the United Kingdom would equal $3.5 trillion, and accumulated Gross domestic product of the four countries would equal $6.5 trillion, thereby providing advantageous circumstances for free trade to be established.

The organization has publicly campaigned for Canada and the United Kingdom to join the existing Closer Economic Relations Trade Agreement (CER) between Australia and New Zealand - not only for increased trade in goods, but also for mutual recognition of skills between the four countries, so skilled migrants can work in each country without the requirement of professional re-examination or additional skills assessments.

Under a multilateral trade deal, the organization has also called for the pooling of standards and the recognition of diplomas to allow the bloc to "weigh against more powerful trade partners such as the United States, China, India or the European Union."

=== Foreign policy ===
The organization has also advocated foreign policy cooperation between the CANZUK countries due to similar cultural and historical ties, specifically working together regarding constitutional matters such as human rights and educational developments. In February 2017, Skinner interviewed for TVO's The Agenda with Steve Paikin where it was emphasised that despite closer diplomatic cooperation, CANZUK International would not advocate closer political union between Canada, Australia, New Zealand and the United Kingdom as seen within the EU, but that it would continue as a campaign "for free movement between four, independent, sovereign countries, and it will remain that way, to work together towards free trade and foreign policy".

== Public response ==
CANZUK International has received mixed opinions from academics, journalists and the general public.

As of September 2016, CANZUK International's online petition advocating free movement between the four countries received over 162,000 signatures. Australian Foreign Minister, Julie Bishop, acknowledged that free movement between the UK and Australia could be part of a future free trade deal once the United Kingdom leaves the European Union.

However, critics have voiced concerns over the logistics of introducing free movement legislation across international borders. Emily Gilbert, an associate professor of Canadian Studies and Geography at the University of Toronto stated: "I think it's an intriguing proposal, but I think chances are it will be some years in the making if it's ever to be realized", while Jeffrey Reitz from the University of Toronto's Munk School of Global Affairs stated: "it's unclear why Canada would pursue a proposal with New Zealand, Australia and U.K. instead of the U.S. and Mexico, countries that are already part of a free trade agreement."

In addition, the four countries compose what was sometimes referred to as the "white" Commonwealth. Skinner told CBC News in March 2015: "This has nothing to do with race."

Polling conducted by the Royal Commonwealth Society in 2016 revealed that 70% of Australians said they were supportive of the CANZUK proposal, with 10% opposed to it; 75% of Canadians said they supported the idea and 15% were opposed to it and 82% of New Zealanders stated that they supported the idea, with 10% opposed. A YouGov poll of 2015 showed 58% support and 19% opposition. The YouGov research also found that British people valued free mobility between the UK and Canada, Australia and New Zealand higher than they did with free mobility between the UK and EU (46% for and 35% against).

Further polling conducted by CI in January 2017 found support for free movement of people and goods with certain limitations on citizens claiming tax-funded payments on entry across the UK, Canada, Australia and New Zealand to be 64% in the UK, 72% in Australia, 77% in Canada and 81% in New Zealand, with undecideds included.

In January 2018, CANZUK International's online petition, calling upon the governments of Canada, Australia, New Zealand and the United Kingdom, achieved over 200,000 signatures with the intention of submitting the petition to each of the four respective governments.

== Political support ==
In January 2018, neoliberal British think-tank the Adam Smith Institute adopted the expansion of migration from CANZUK nations as a policy priority for 2018, declaring CANZUK International's platform as "an idea whose time has come".

In August 2018, the Conservative Party of Canada voted almost unanimously to incorporate the organization's proposals as party policy following its annual convention, held in Halifax.

== Research ==
In addition to its free movement campaign, CANZUK International also conducts research into socio-economic issues affecting Canada, Australia, New Zealand and the UK, and occasional research into other Commonwealth countries regarding their candidacy for a future free movement initiative. Research conducted has varied in subject, including general elections, the cost of living in differing cities throughout the four Commonwealth countries, and the 2016 referendum regarding the UK's membership of the European Union.

== See also ==
- Commonwealth of Nations
- Freedom of movement for workers in the European Union
- Trans-Tasman Travel Arrangement
