= Australia–United States Free Trade Agreement =

Preferential trade agreement

United States–Australia Free Trade Agreement (AUFTA) (American English); Australia–United States Free Trade Agreement (AUSFTA) (Australian English)
- Type: Free trade agreement
- Drafted: 18 May 2004
- Signed: 18 May 2004
- Location: Washington, D.C., United States
- Effective: 1 January 2005
- Condition: 2 months after notification of each state that all internal procedures have been completed
- Original signatories: Mark Vaile (Minister for Trade); Robert Zoellick (U.S. Trade Representative)
- Ratifiers: Australia; United States
- Languages: English

The Australia–United States Free Trade Agreement (AUSFTA) is a preferential trade agreement between Australia and the United States modelled on the North American Free Trade Agreement (NAFTA). The AUSFTA was signed on 18 May 2004 and came into effect on 1 January 2005.

== History of the FTA ==
United States-Australia Free Trade Agreement Implementation Act
- Long title: To implement the United States-Australia Free Trade Agreement
- Enacted by: the 108th United States Congress

Citations
- Public law: Pub. L. 108–286 (text) (PDF)

Legislative history
- Introduced in the House of Representatives as H.R. 4759 by Tom DeLay (R-TX) on July 6, 2004; Committee consideration by House Ways and Means; Passed the House of Representatives on July 14, 2004 (314-109-1); Passed the Senate on July 15, 2004 (80-16); Signed into law by President George W. Bush on August 3, 2004

US Free Trade Agreement Implementation Act 2004 & US Free Trade Agreement Implementation (Customs Tariff) Act 2004

Parliament of Australia
- Long title: An Act to implement the Australia-United States Free Trade Agreement, and for other purposes
- Citation: No. 120, 2004; No. 121, 2004
- Passed by: House of Representatives
- Passed: 24 June 2004
- Passed by: Senate
- Passed: 13 August 2004
- Royal assent: 16 August 2004
- Status: In force

The U.S. first proposed a free trade agreement with Australia as far back as 1945. In more recent times, the prospect of an Australia-U.S. FTA was raised in the 1980s by the Hawke Government. In 1991 U.S. president George H. W. Bush offered to begin FTA negotiation with Australia and New Zealand, but was turned down by Australian Labor Party prime minister Paul Keating.

It was not until early 2001, after the election of George W. Bush in the U.S. and with John Howard in power in Australia, that an Australia-U.S. FTA finally began to take shape. In April 2001, President Bush signalled his interest in pursuing an FTA with Australia provided "everything is on the table". Following this, in 2004, the Australian Department of Foreign Affairs and Trade commissioned a private consultancy – the Centre for International Economics (CIE) – to model the economic impacts of such an agreement. Negotiations for the FTA began in March 2003 and after six rounds of negotiations held in Canberra, Hawaii and Washington, D.C., the text was finally agreed to in February 2004, and signed off on by Australian Trade Minister Mark Vaile and U.S. Trade Representative Robert Zoellick in Washington in May 2004.

The FTA was ratified by the United States Congress with the passage of the United States-Australia Free Trade Agreement Implementation Act. It was passed by the House of Representatives on 14 July 2004 by a vote of 314–109 and by the Senate on 15 July 2004 by a vote of 80–16, and signed into law by President George W. Bush on 3 August 2004.

In Australia, the agreement's implementing legislation, the US Free Trade Agreement Implementation Act 2004, was passed, with amendments, by the Senate on 13 August 2004. After some delay, the U.S. Administration accepted the amended Australian legislation as being consistent with implementation of the agreement.

The agreement came into force in both countries on 1 January 2005.

== Provisions of the FTA ==
The text of the Free Trade Agreement is divided into twenty-three sections, listed and summarized as follows:

=== Establishment of the free trade area and definitions ===
This chapter lays the framework for the FTA. It states that the provisions are consistent with the relevant sections of the General Agreement on Tariffs and Trade (GATT) 1994 and the General Agreement on Trade in Services (GATS). Both GATT and GATS are documents created by World Trade Organization (WTO) agreements and they lay the boundaries for subsequent bilateral agreements such as the Australian-U.S. FTA.

The chapter also sets definitions to be used throughout the agreement in order to assure uniformity.

=== National treatment and market access for goods ===
Chapter two of the FTA lays out conditions for what types of goods are subject to non-discriminatory treatment. Certain types of goods are fully applicable to the agreement immediately and some are phased in over a period of years or temporarily applicable.

The chapter also reminds the two countries that they must abide by the WTO rules applying what is called national treatment. "National treatment" means that each country will provide the same treatment to imported goods from the other country as if they were domestically produced goods.

Finally, the chapter established a Committee on Trade in Goods with the purpose of providing arbitration for each country to "raise issues of concern in relation to tariffs, non-tariff measures, rules of origin and customs administration."

=== Agriculture ===
The agriculture section of the agreement outlines the system for eliminating most tariffs for agriculture products being traded between the two countries. It also agrees to eliminate export subsidies when the good in question is being exported to one of the two party countries.

Special tariff-rate quotas are part of the agreement. These quotas allow Australian producers to export increasing amounts of these products free of duty to the United States during the tariff elimination period. The following agricultural products are designated:

- Beef
- Dairy
- Tobacco
- Cotton
- Peanuts
- Avocados

The quota systems vary for the different products and are outlined, in detail, in this section.

The section also sets up a Committee on Agriculture with the purpose of providing "a formal opportunity for Australia and the United States to discuss a wide range of agricultural issues relevant to the Agreement, including trade promotion activities; barriers to trade; and consultation on the range of export competition issues."

Finally, the two countries have committed to working with the WTO on a multilateral scale to eliminate export subsidies to other WTO member countries.

=== Textiles and apparel ===
Chapter four deals with the trade of textiles and apparel between the two party countries. The bulk of this section outlines the rules of origin provisions with regard to textile goods and safeguarding the domestic markets of the two countries. The agreement provides a mechanism to institute emergency action should the sudden increase in imports due to the reduction of tariffs lead to detrimental effects on the domestic industry of the importing country.

In addition, this section details the cooperation of Customs authorities for ensuring that the rules of the agreement are carried out and outlines possible actions which can be taken if the exporting country appears to be acting in bad faith.

=== Rules of origin ===
The rules of origin section outlines the rules for determining the origin of the goods being traded in order to establish eligibility and also the method to determine the value of the goods traded.

For the purposes of the FTA, this section defines an originating good as those that:

- are wholly obtained or produced entirely in the country, such as minerals extracted there, vegetable goods harvested there, and live animals born and raised there;
- are produced in the country wholly from originating materials; or
- are produced in the country partly from non-originating materials.

The section also outlines supporting documentation and verifications that the goods being traded are, indeed, originating in the exporting country, as defined by the agreement. The responsibility for verification of the applicable conditions is given to the importer. Denial of preferential treatment and penalties may apply if proper verification is not provided by the importer upon request made by the importing country.

=== Customs administration ===
This section outlines the requirements of the customs authorities to:

1. promptly publish law, regulations, guidelines and administrative rulings,
2. administer customs laws in a uniform, impartial and reasonable manner,
3. provide advance rulings on tariff classifications and rules of origin within a given period of time,
4. provide some sort of administrative body to review customs determinations,
5. cooperate with each other on all reasonable matters, especially those involving suspicion of illegal activity,
6. protect the confidentiality of information provided in cooperation with other customs authorities,
7. impose their respective penalties for violations of customs laws and regulations,
8. promptly release goods consistent with ensuring compliance with customs laws,
9. apply risk management systems to concentrate on high-risk areas and facilitate low-risk areas, and,
10. maintain expedited procedures with respect to express shipments.

=== Sanitary and phytosanitary measures ===
In conjunction with the existing WTO Sanitary and Phytosanitary (SPS) Agreement, this section sets up two committees to ensure that the SPS agreement provisions are followed.

- Committee on Sanitary and Phytosanitary Matters (provided with a mandate for "increasing the mutual understanding of the SPS measures and regulatory processes of each Party as well as continuing the cooperative efforts of the Parties internationally")
- Standing Working Group on Animal and Plant Health (to help with the resolution of specific animal and plant health matters with the goal of resolving the problems with the least adverse effect on trade as possible)

=== Technical barriers to trade ===
This section acknowledges the rights and obligations of Australia and the United States to each other with respect to combating barriers to trade. These rights and obligations were laid out by the WTO Agreement on Technical Barriers to Trade, which deals with standards, regulations, and conformity assessments, among other things.

Most of the section is language from both countries agreeing to share information on several levels of government regulation. They agree to attempt to accept each other's regulations and publish such rules and regulations in a timely manner in order to ensure transparency.

=== Safeguards ===
The goal of the safeguards section of the agreement is to lay out an agreed upon structure to guard against severe adverse effects to each countries domestic industries during the transition period after lifting tariffs. The countries also agree to consider the exclusion from the application of global WTO safeguards imports from the other country where those imports are not a substantial cause of the injury to the domestic industry.

=== Cross-border trade in services ===
Section 10 of the FTA gives clear meaning to the phrase "cross-border trade in services" and provides suppliers with an open environment in which to conduct their business. It requires that each country give the other's service suppliers national treatment or most-favored-nation treatment and prohibits many restrictions to market access and transfers.

=== Investment ===
The investment chapter of the FTA provides clear definitions as to what investments are covered and gives cross-border investors assurances in order to make it as safe as if they were investing in their own country. Among other things, the section prohibits each country from imposing or enforcing any of the following requirements in relation to an investment in its territory:

- to export a given level or percentage of goods or services;
- to achieve a given level or percentage of domestic content;
- to purchase, use, or accord a preference to goods produced in its territory, or to purchase goods from persons in its territory;
- to relate in any way the volume or value of imports to the volume or value of exports or to the amount of foreign exchange inflows associated with an investment;
- to restrict sales of goods or services in its territory that an investment produces or supplies by relating such sales in any way to the volume or value of its exports or foreign exchange earnings;
- to transfer a particular technology, a production process, or other proprietary knowledge to a person in its territory; or
- to supply exclusively from its territory the goods that an investment produces or the services it supplies to a specific regional market or to the world market.

=== Telecommunications ===
This section details agreed upon terms by both countries to assure fair trade between the telecommunications industries in each country. The rules specifically exclude measures relating to broadcast or cable distribution of radio or television programming.

Among other provisions, the agreement lays out rules for settling disputes among the members of the telecommunications industries in one country with the members in the other. It entitles enterprises to:

- seek timely review by a regulator or court to resolve disputes;
- seek review of disputes regarding appropriate terms, conditions, and rates for interconnection; and
- to obtain judicial review of a determination by a regulatory body.

=== Financial services ===
This chapter is concerned with ensuring a non-discriminatory environment with regard to financial services. The section defines financial services as "all insurance and insurance-related services, and all banking and other financial services, as well as services incidental or auxiliary to a service of a financial nature."

The section further lays out the scope of its application as it applies to measures by either country that affect:

- financial institutions located in the territory of that country that are controlled by persons of the other country;
- investors of the other country who have invested in financial institutions located in that country;
- the investments of investors of the other country in financial institutions located in that country; and
- cross-border trade in financial services by service suppliers of the other country.

=== Competition-related matters ===
The parties agreed to minimise obstacles to the operation of each other's competition and consumer protection policies. Australia agreed that its governments at all levels would not provide any competitive advantage to any government businesses simply because they are government-owned. This provision is consistent with existing provisions of Australia's National Competition Policy

=== Government procurement ===
Subject to some exceptions, and the non-participation of some US states, the agreement required, in government and government agency procurement, that each party should accord to the other treatment no less favourable than the most favourable treatment accorded to domestic goods, services and suppliers.

=== Electronic commerce ===
The parties agreed to co-operate on mechanisms to facilitate electronic commerce, not to impose customs duties on digital products and for each to apply non-discriminatory treatment to the digital products of the others.

=== Intellectual property rights ===
Australia agreed to extend its copyright expiration period from 50 to 70 years after the author's death where copyright is calculated on the basis of the life of a natural person, and 70 years after the first performance or publication in other cases.

The agreement expands the rights of patent holders.

The agreement requires legal enforcement of digital rights management systems, however an Australian legislative committee has issued a report stating that this portion of the treaty has a "significant flaw": while the agreement provides permitted exceptions allowing the use of copyright access circumvention devices, it also disallows access to the tools used for such circumvention. The report goes on to term it a "lamentable and inexcusable flaw", an "egregious flaw", and even a "flaw that verges on absurdity". The committee expressed the strong view that the Government must find a solution to the flaw before implementing this portion of the treaty.

=== Labour ===
Chapter 18 of the Agreement deals with labour, and is largely confined to general statements of principle. The Parties reaffirm their obligations as members of the International Labour Organization (ILO) and their commitments under the ILO Declaration on Fundamental Principles and Rights at Work and its Follow-up (1998) (ILO Declaration). The Agreement recognizes the right of each Party to establish its own labour standards, and to adopt or modify accordingly its labour laws, and states that each Party shall strive to ensure that its laws provide for labour standards consistent with the internationally recognised labour principles.

=== Environment ===
Chapter 19 responds to concerns that parties may seek to gain trade advantages by relaxing environmental laws.

Article 19.2 states that "The Parties recognise that it is inappropriate to encourage trade or investment by weakening or reducing the protections afforded in their respective environmental laws."

Accordingly, each Party shall strive to ensure that it does not waive or otherwise derogate from, or offer to waive or otherwise derogate from, such laws in a manner that weakens or reduces the protections afforded in those laws as an encouragement for trade with the other Party, or as an encouragement for the establishment, acquisition, expansion, or retention of an investment in its territory.

=== Transparency ===
Chapter 20 requires that:

Each Party shall ensure that its laws, regulations, procedures, and administrative rulings of general application respecting any matter covered by this Agreement are promptly published or otherwise made available in such a manner as to enable interested persons and the other Party to become acquainted with them.

and that

Each Party shall maintain judicial, quasi-judicial, or administrative tribunals or procedures for the purpose of the prompt review20-2 and, where warranted, correction of final administrative actions regarding matters covered by this Agreement.

==== Pharmaceutical Benefits Scheme ====
See Pharmaceutical Benefits Scheme

== U.S. attitudes to the FTA ==
After the FTA was signed, there were initially concerns that the American agricultural sector would lobby against the agreement, due to a fear that it could interfere with the government's farm subsidies program. However, the agreement, with temporary limits on importation of Australian agricultural products such as beef and sugar cane managed to allay the concerns of the American agricultural market (while greatly frustrating many Australian producers).

A coalition of trade unions and other groups did speak out against the agreement on the basis that it would cause similar problems to those experienced by NAFTA.

More substantial lobbying was undertaken by American pharmaceutical companies, who were concerned about the Australian Pharmaceutical Benefits Scheme. See below.

American manufacturing lobbies strongly supported the FTA.

On 15 July, both houses of the United States Congress gave strong support to the FTA. The agreement was also supported by Democratic Party presidential nominee John Kerry.

Additionally, labour groups expressed concern regarding the agreement. In a report to the USTR office, the Labor Advisory Committee (LAC) recommended that Congress reject the U.S.-Australia FTA because they believed the agreement failed to meet congressional negotiating objectives.

== Australian attitudes to the FTA ==
=== Support ===
The agreement became a major political issue leading up to the 2004 Elections. After a protracted period of negotiation under Howard government Trade Minister Mark Vaile, the agreement was strongly supported by the Howard government as an enormous potential gain to the Australian economy and as essential to the continuation of the U.S.-Australia alliance.

The government relied on estimates of the economic benefits of the FTA computed by the Centre for International Economics, a consultancy group. The leading group supporting the FTA was called Austa. Austa's arguments focused on the dynamic benefits of integration with the U.S. economy.

=== Opposition ===
Criticisms of the FTA appeared from a number of sources and on a number of grounds:

==== Trade diversion ====
Economic theory suggests that bilateral agreements like the FTA will lead to trade creation between the parties directly involved, but will also cause trade diversion from third countries, offsetting any benefits. Bilateral agreements may also undermine multilateral agreements such as those associated with the World Trade Organization. Partly as a result of these factors, the estimates of benefits produced by the CIE and relied on by the government were disputed by most economists who made submissions to the Senate Committees inquiring into the topic, some of whom concluded that the agreement would reduce Australia's economic welfare.

==== Intellectual property ====
The provisions of the AUSFTA in Ch 17 required Australia to offer stronger protection to American intellectual property. In particular, the minimum term of copyright was extended to 70 years after the author's death. Most economists and others interested in intellectual property issues regarded this as undesirable. A number of prominent American economists took the same view in the case of Eldred v. Ashcroft.

Other key changes included:

- special copyright term extension for photographs
- broader definition of technological protection measures, narrow exceptions, and review process
- protection of temporary copies
- stronger protection of electronic rights management information
- protection of pay television broadcasts
- safe harbour provisions for Internet Service Providers
- protection of performers' economic and moral rights in respect of sound recordings
- broader civil and criminal offences

For a discussion of the copyright changes, see Rimmer, M. "Robbery Under Arms: Copyright Law and the Australia-United States Free Trade Agreement"

==== Local content provisions ====
Many in the Australian film and television community expressed concern over the effect of the agreement on government regulations enforcing a mandatory minimum of locally produced content on television. Since American content can be purchased by networks at a cost far less than the local production of Australian content, fears were raised that the agreement would result in the diminishing fraction of home-grown media being screened on Australian television networks and in Australian cinemas being reduced even further. As a result, the Media, Entertainment and Arts Alliance, as well as a number of prominent artists individually, argued for rejection of the FTA on the grounds that it would erode Australian culture.

==== Manufacturing and agricultural sector ====
Australia as a whole is heavily reliant on the primary sector and the main benefits of a FTA between the two countries were seen to be increased access to the large, but heavily subsidised and protected, American market by Australian producers. In particular, the rural and regional-based National Party lobbied hard to have the agreement extend to the export of sugar. The eventual provisions of the agreement did not go as far as had been hoped, and as a result, some lobbyists for the sugar industry, notably independent Bob Katter, urged rejection of the FTA. However, many, such as then Premier of Queensland Peter Beattie, still felt that the agreement was a net gain for Australian agriculture and supported ratification on that basis.

The Australian manufacturing sector was another problematic area. Australian labour, wage and environmental protection standards are substantially higher than those of the US. The Australian Manufacturing Workers Union ran a high-profile campaign against the FTA on the basis that it would lead to manufacturing jobs being outsourced overseas.

==== Pharmaceutical Benefits Scheme ====
The Pharmaceutical Benefits Scheme (PBS) is a central component of the Australian healthcare system. The scheme provides reimbursement to community pharmacy for the costs of dispensing prescription medicines prescribed in accordance with the PBS Schedule, a comprehensive but closed formulary. Drugs are added to the formulary on the basis of an assessment of comparative effectiveness and cost effectiveness compared to the therapy most likely to be replaced in practice. The result is that where there is no evidence of incremental benefit, a drug may not be listed at a higher price than the comparator with the result that for many (but by no means all) drugs the prices for subsidy purposes are a great deal cheaper than in many other major markets.

While the scheme is very effective at keeping many drug prices low, pharmaceutical corporations in both the US and Australia are wary of the operation of the scheme, since they argue that higher drug prices are necessary to fund the costs of research and development. The American pharmaceutical companies claim that in enjoying low-cost medicines, Australians are essentially free riding on the costs of research performed in the U.S.

While companies have in particular criticised the process by which drugs are listed on the PBS, claiming that it lacks transparency, public health advocates have claimed that calls for transparency are merely an effort by drug companies to gain greater control over the process of listing. To a large degree the existing limitations on the transparency of the process are those that have been imposed by the industry itself. The text of the Agreement included text mandating transparency to the public, reflecting an offensive interest of Australia, thus creating a treaty level obligation to circumvent the efforts of the pharmaceutical industry to continue to frustrate public transparency of PBS processes.

Disquiet about the Pharmaceutical Benefits Scheme led to speculation that the American side would lobby heavily for its abrogation as an integral component of a free trade agreement. The Government was criticised, particularly by the Australian Democrats and Greens, for not doing enough to safeguard the operations of the Pharmaceutical Benefits Scheme, allegations which the Government strenuously denied. Some academics (such as Thomas Alured Faunce) claimed that the provisions of the Agreement would lead to increases in the prices of PBS medicines. However the relevant text was actually limited to issue of process and transparency, and contained no provisions that could affect price, and this was ultimately shown not to be the case.

==== Ratification of the FTA ====
The Australian Government did not hold a majority in the Senate, and thus required the support of the opposition Labor party, the Greens, Democrats, or independent senators in order to secure ratification. The Government put heavy pressure on Labor Party leader Mark Latham to secure Opposition support of the agreement (knowing that Latham, among many Labor members, viewed the FTA as beneficial). The issue had divided the party, with the Left faction in particular arguing that Labor should reject the agreement.

Latham responded unexpectedly by making Labor's support of the FTA conditional on an amendment that would allegedly safeguard the PBS. This effectively turned the tables on Howard: if the Government refused the amendment as unnecessary, it opened itself to claims it was not safeguarding Australian interests; if it supported the amendment, it then tacitly admitted that the original terms of the agreement were inadequate. The bill was eventually amended and passed.

Latham's amendment proposals were supported by the Australian Medical Association, but dismissed as ineffective by the Greens and Democrats, who still argued for outright rejection of the FTA.

== Outcomes ==
Monthly value of Australian merchandise exports to the United States (A$ millions) since 1988

Monthly value of US merchandise exports to Australia (A$ millions) since 1988

In the year following the agreement, Australian exports to the U.S. declined, while U.S. exports to Australia increased. This followed the International Monetary Fund's prediction that the Australia-United States FTA would shrink the Australian economy marginally because of the loss of trade with other countries. The IMF estimated $US5.25 billion of extra U.S. imports entering into Australia per year under the FTA, but only $US2.97 billion of extra Australian exports to the U.S. per year. However, it remains unclear whether or not Australia's worsening trade deficit with the United States can be solely attributed to the FTA. It may have been a lagged effect of an appreciation of the Australian dollar against the US dollar between 2000 and 2003.

For the U.S., the FTA improved the overall trade deficit situation, creating a trade surplus with Australia which rose 31.7% in the first quarter of 2005, compared to the same timeframe in 2004. U.S. exports to Australia increased 11.7% in the first quarter of 2005 to nearly $3.7 billion for the quarter. Agriculture exports to Australia increased 20%.

According to Australian Department of Foreign Affairs and Trade figures the imbalance in trade between the U.S. and Australia increased substantially during 2007. The United States became Australia's largest import source, with goods and services imported to a value of over A$31 billion. Australia's exports to the U.S., however, amounted to only $15.8 billion AU. It remains unclear what, if any, real benefits the agreement has produced.

In U.S. Fiscal Year 2006 (October 2005 through September 2006), which was the first full year during which E-3 regulations were in effect, the U.S. Department of Homeland Security recorded 2,123 admissions of Australian citizens as E-3 status foreign workers under the treaty. 9,294 admissions were recorded in U.S. Fiscal Year 2007 (October 2006 through September 2007).

According to Shiro Armstrong from the Crawford School of Public Policy at the Australian National University concluded, from over 10 years of dataset from the Productivity Commission suggests that Australian and US trade with the rest of the world fell - that there was trade diversion - due to AUSFTA after controlling for country specific factors. Estimates also suggest trade between Australia and the United States fell in association with the implementation of AUSFTA - also after controlling for country-specific factors. Shiro Armstrong also concludes Australia and the United States reduced their trade with the rest of the world by US$53 billion and are worse off than they would have been without the agreement.

== See also ==
- Rules of Origin
- Market access
- Free-trade area
- Tariffs
- E-3 visa program passed by the United States government in the aftermath of the AUSFTA.
- Import sensitive product
- Australia–United States relations

Australian free trade agreements:

- Australia–Chile Free Trade Agreement
- Australia–New Zealand Closer Economic Relations Trade Agreement
- Australia–United Kingdom Free Trade Agreement
