= Agreement on Climate Change, Trade and Sustainability =

International trade deal

- Members of the Agreement on Climate Change, Trade and Sustainability
- Type: Trade agreement
- Negotiators: 4; Costa Rica; Iceland; New Zealand; Switzerland

The Agreement on Climate Change, Trade and Sustainability (ACCTS) is a proposed trade agreement between Costa Rica, Iceland, New Zealand and Switzerland. The deal will eliminate tariffs on hundreds of environmental goods and services alongside carbon emission reduction commitments. Negotiations concluded on the 2nd July 2024 and the agreement was signed on 15 November 2024 following legal verification.

== History ==
ACCTS was first proposed in 2019 by New Zealand and negotiations started between New Zealand, Fiji, Costa Rica, Iceland and Norway. Switzerland joined negotiations in 2020. In 2021, the United Kingdom indicated they would not join the agreement in order to maintain their fossil fuel subsidies. New Zealand, Costa Rica, Iceland and Switzerland finished negotiations in July 2024 following fifteen rounds. Norway continues to consider joining.

== Provisions ==
ACCTS includes provisions for:

- The removal of tariffs on 300 environmental goods including low energy light bulbs, rechargeable batteries, wool and wood products.
- Reform, reduction and elimination of fossil fuel subsidies.
- Consistent voluntary eco-labelling guidelines.

== Membership ==
=== Current ===
The following countries have signed ACCTS following legal review:

- Costa Rica
- Iceland
- New Zealand
- Switzerland

=== Potential ===
The following countries have voiced interest in joining in the future:

- Norway
- Sweden

ACCTS is open to all World Trade Organization members to join.

== See also ==
- Paris Agreement
- Politics of climate change
