= Market access =

Ability to sell goods and services across borders

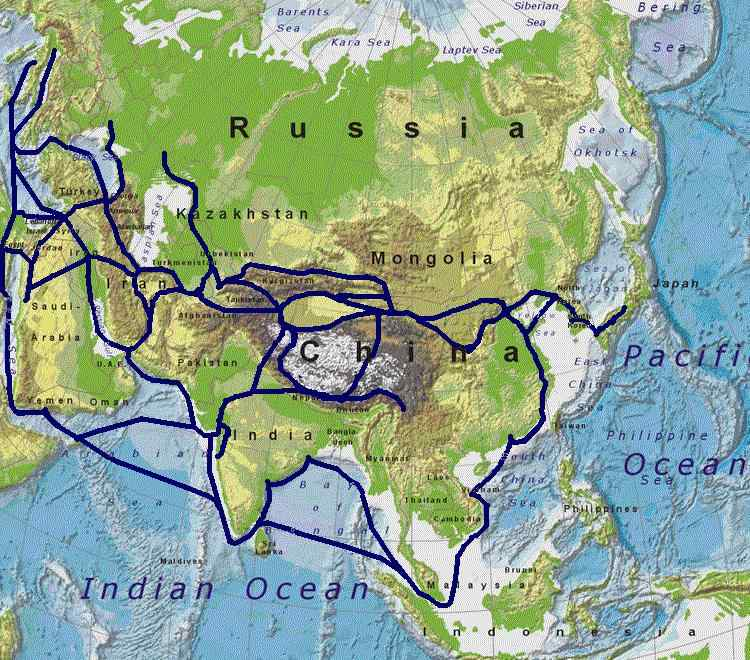
Ancient Silk Road - a network of trade routes which connected the East and West

In international trade, market access refers to a company's ability to enter a foreign market by selling its goods and services in another country. Market access is not the same as free trade, because market access is normally subject to conditions or requirements (such as tariffs or quotas), whereas under ideal free trade conditions goods and services can circulate across borders without any barriers to trade. Expanding market access is therefore often a more achievable goal of trade negotiations than achieving free trade.

Market access concessions and limitations to market access differ greatly between trade in goods and trade in services. While market access for goods mainly involves measures at the border such as customs duties or quantitative restrictions, market access for services relates more to the application of domestic regulation behind the border. Moreover, in a world of proliferating regionalism, preferential market access for goods and services also have distinctive characteristics from non-preferential market access within the multilateral trading system.

== Market access in merchandise trade ==
=== Market access in the multilateral trading system ===
Market access for goods imported into the market of a WTO Member may be impeded or restricted in various ways. The most common barriers to market access are customs duties, quantitative restrictions, technical requirements, lack of transparency of national trade regulation, unfair application of customs formalities and procedures. Considering their diversity, there must be different rules to regulate these tariff and non-tariff barriers to market access.

WTO law provides three main groups of rules on market access: rules governing customs duties (tariffs), rules governing quantitative restrictions (quotas), and rules governing other non-tariff barriers such as technical regulations and standards, sanitary and phytosanitary measures, customs formalities and government procurement practices. In addition, rules concerning transparency and “justiciability” are also included to ensure effective market access.

Customs duties

The imposition of customs duties on imported goods is not prohibited under the General Agreement on Tariffs and Trade (GATT), but the later encourages WTO Members to gradually reduce customs duties for mutual benefit. Prior to a country's accession to the WTO, it must negotiate with existing Members on tariff bindings, which will be listed later in its Schedule of Concessions. According to Article II:1 of the GATT, whenever a tariff binding exists for a certain product, the customs duties applied to such product must not exceed the level at which they were bound.

Quantitative restrictions

While customs duties are in principle not prohibited as long as they do not exceed the bound rates, quantitative restrictions on trade in goods are generally forbidden. According to Article XI:1 of the GATT, unless there is an exception, WTO Members are not allowed to ban the importation or exportation of goods or to subject them to quotas.

Non-Tariff Barriers

Nowadays, for many products and many countries, non-tariff barriers to trade, such as technical regulations and standards, sanitary and phytosanitary measures, customs formalities and government procurement practices are becoming more important than customs duties or quantitative restrictions. Rules on non-tariff barriers are set out in a number of GATT provisions (e.g., Article VIII on Fees and Formalities Connected with Importation and Exportation) and several specific WTO agreements, particularly the Agreement on Technical Barriers to Trade (the “TBT Agreement”) and the Agreement on the Application of Sanitary and Phytosanitary Measures (the “SPS Agreement”).

TBT and SPS agreements basically prohibit measures which discriminate between “like” imported and domestic products. In addition, the TBT Agreement also requires that technical regulations are not more trade-restrictive than necessary to fulfill one of the legitimate policy objectives mentioned in the Agreement. Whereas, the SPS Agreement requires that sanitary and phytosanitary measures are in line with scientific principles, and there must be sufficient scientific evidence to apply these measures except when these measures are maintained provisionally.

Transparency and justiciability

The requirement that Members shall publish all trade laws, regulations and judicial decisions in order to allow governments and traders to have access to and become acquainted with them is crucial to ensure effective entry to foreign markets. Likewise, the obligation on Members to maintain or establish judicial, arbitral or administrative tribunals in favor of a prompt, objective and impartial review of administrative decisions affecting trade is also essential to guarantee security and predictability of market access. These obligations are contained in several GATT provisions (such as Article X on Publication and Administration of Trade Regulations). Recently, the Agreement on Trade Facilitation has been concluded in order to clarify and make these obligations become more enforceable.

=== Preferential market access ===
Preferential market access refers to the fact market opening commitments that go beyond the WTO obligations, either because the exporting country of origin has an agreement to establish a free-trade area (FTA) with the importing country, or because the latter has accorded them special treatment by virtue of the former’s low level of development and/or due to its adoption of certain policies to embrace sustainable development.

The formation of free-trade areas is considered an exception to the most favored nation (MFN) principle in the WTO because the preferences that parties to an FTA exclusively grant each other go beyond their accession commitments. Although Article XXIV of the GATT allows WTO Members to establish FTAs or to adopt interim agreements necessary for the establishment thereof, there are several conditions with respect to free-trade areas, or interim agreements leading to the formation of FTAs. According to Article XXIV:8(b) of the GATT, “a free-trade area shall be understood to mean a group of two or more customs territories in which the duties and other restrictive regulations of commerce (except, where necessary, those permitted under Articles XI, XII, XIII, XIV, XV and XX) are eliminated on substantially all the trade between the constituent territories in products originating in such territories.”

The Decision on Differential and More Favorable Treatment, Reciprocity and Fuller Participation of Developing Countries adopted by signatories to the GATT in 1979 (the “Enabling Clause”) allows derogation to the MFN treatment in favor of developing and least developed countries (LDCs). It is the WTO’s legal basis for the Generalized System of Preferences (GSP). Particularly, merchandise exports from LDCs benefit from duty-free, quota-free market access, and from more favorable rules of origin.

In order to gain preferential market access under these preferential trade arrangements, goods must satisfy applicable rules of origin and obtain proofs of origin to indicate that they are originating in an FTA partner country, or from a GSP beneficiary country. If imported goods fail to comply with origin requirements, benefit will be denied, and the goods will have to enter the importing market under non-preferential basis.

== Market access in services trade ==
Market access for services is by nature more complicated than that for goods: in the realm of merchandise trade, market access concerns the reduction of border measures as goods enter a foreign market, whereas in services trade, market access involves "reducing government policy interventions which are less visible and may be applied after a service supplier has entered the market". These measures often take the form of regulations directed at domestic policy objectives rather than external trade policy objectives. Governments usually have little consideration of the impacts of such interventions on market access for foreign services and service suppliers.

Within the WTO framework, the concept on market access for services and services suppliers is provided for by Article XVI of the General Agreement on Trade in Services (GATS):

Article XVI: Market Access

1. With respect to market access through the modes of supply identified in Article I, each Member shall accord services and service suppliers of any other Member treatment no less favorable than that provided for under the terms, limitations and conditions agreed and specified in its Schedule

2. In sectors where market-access commitments are undertaken, the measures which a Member shall not maintain or adopt either on the basis of a regional subdivision or on the basis of its entire territory, unless otherwise specified in its Schedule, are defined as:

(a) limitations on the number of service suppliers whether in the form of numerical quotas, monopolies, exclusive service suppliers or the requirements of an economic needs test;

(b) limitations on the total value of service transactions or assets in the form of numerical quotas or the requirement of an economic needs test;

(c) limitations on the total number of service operations or on the total quantity of service output expressed in terms of designated numerical units in the form of quotas or the requirement of an economic needs test;

(d) limitations on the total number of natural persons that may be employed in a particular service sector or that a service supplier may employ and who are necessary for, and directly related to, the supply of a specific service in the form of numerical quotas or the requirement of an economic needs test;

(e) measures which restrict or require specific types of legal entity or joint venture through which a service supplier may supply a service; and

(f) limitations on the participation of foreign capital in terms of maximum percentage limit on foreign shareholding or the total value of individual or aggregate foreign investment.

When a WTO Member undertakes any commitment in a service sector or sub-sector, it is obliged to specify for each of the modes of supply (cross-border supply, consumption abroad, commercial presence, and presence of natural persons) what restrictions it opts to maintain regarding market access. All market access restrictions specified in a Member's Schedule of Commitments must fall into one of the six categories provided for in GATS Article XVI:2, which include four types of quantitative restriction, limitations on types of legal entity, and limitations on foreign equity participation. A Member is not allowed to adopt or maintain limitations falling within one of these categories unless they are indicated in its Schedule.

Similar to preferential market access in the field of merchandise trade, preferential liberalization of trade in services is also an objective of FTAs. Indeed, enhanced liberalization of services trade besides merchandise trade has become a significant feature of new generation FTAs. (Indeed, the term free-trade area is originally meant by the GATT to exclusively cover trade in goods. An agreement with a similar purpose, i.e., to enhance liberalization of trade in services, is named by GATS Article V as an "economic integration agreement". However, in practice, the term is now widely used to refer to agreements covering not only goods but also services and even investment.)

Commitments going beyond GATS (or GATS-plus) have become a distinctive characteristic of regionalism in services trade. Evidence from recent research proves that in all market access areas, FTAs in general offer "value added" as compared to the GATS. Despite modest improvements in Mode 4 (movement of natural persons to supply services in another country), in almost all modes of supply and sectors, FTA commitments are found to go remarkably beyond GATS offers in terms of both deepened bindings and new bindings. However, most RTAs do not surpass the GATS as it comes to securing the "rule-making interface" between domestic regulation and trade in services, as well as to special and differential treatment for LDCs. RTA commitments are also inclined to lag behind GATS offers (known as GATS-minus) with regard to safeguard mechanism and disciplines on subsidies.

In general, exploiting market access for a service sector, similar to trade in goods, requires identification of the relative strength or comparative advantage of that sector, in order to specialize in the production and export of those services. At the same time, it will require the identification of restrictions in foreign markets and skillful negotiations towards reducing and removing them so as to maximize their export revenues.

Economic needs tests (ENTs), referred to in Article XVI, have been described as "ill-defined" and their specifications as "unclear". It has been argued that they are a barrier to the implementation of Mode 4 within GATS.

== Market access in healthcare ==
In the U.S. healthcare market, market access refers to the degree to which health-related products, services, and solutions can be identified, researched, purchased, used, and evaluated by individuals, organizations, and communities.

Complete market access is evidenced by the unrestricted flow of information, money, manpower (e.g., clinicians), materials (e.g., products), and methods (e.g., services) under "free market" conditions (supportive of the "invisible hand" of capitalism).

Market access is supported by qualitative and quantitative evidence of value, with value determined or assured through health economics and outcomes research (HEOR), comparative-effectiveness research (CER), patient-reported outcomes (PROs), evidence-based medicine (EBM), real-world data (RWD), real-world evidence (RWE), and longitudinal real-world results (RWR). Health technology assessment (HTA) organizations like the Institute for Clinical and Economic Review (ICER) contribute to the evidence base. Product, service, and solution developers may compile global value dossiers (GVDs) to support market access. The intellectual, political, and economic interplay of academics, health and human services (HHS) professionals, connected professional communities (e.g., health economics professionals), and trade associations (e.g., the Pharmaceutical Research and Manufacturers of America [PhRMA]) may help set the standards for value assessments.

Market access may be restricted through a variety of means including the coverage (e.g., formulary), insurance coding, reimbursement, value-based contracting (VBC), and outcomes-based compensation (OBC) policies of third-party administrators (TPAs), third-party payers (TPP), capitated healthcare providers (e.g., Kaiser), and self-funded employers (e.g., Boeing).

Restrictions may be applied in the interest of reducing healthcare costs (e.g., under group health, workers' compensation, short-term disability, or long-term disability benefits); improving healthcare value (e.g., economic, clinical, and humanistic outcomes [ECHOs]); asserting political or economic authority; and other factors.

Market access affects the well-being, productive capacity, and socioeconomic status of individuals, organizations, and communities.

These individuals, organizations, and communities include but are not limited to U.S. consumers, patients, subpopulations (e.g., covered lives under fully-funded and self-funded health insurance plans), health plan sponsors or health plan purchasers (e.g., self-insured employers and unions), healthcare practitioners (e.g., HCPs including MDs/DOs, as well as allied healthcare and public health professionals), healthcare providers organizations (e.g., patient-centered medical homes [PCMHs], primary care super clinics [PCSCs], specialty medical practices, hospitals and health systems, accountable care organizations [ACOs]), and health plans (public and private insurers such as BCBS, CVS Health [Aetna], Kaiser, Medicare, Medicaid, TRICARE).

A broad range of individuals, organizations, and communities in the U.S. healthcare market now employ market access strategies to protect their financial, clinical, and humanistic interests. For example, parents, nutrition companies, and patient advocacy groups may engage lobbying firms to ensure legislators mandate insurance coverage for less obvious healthcare products such as medical foods for phenylketonuria (PKU).

These individuals, organizations, and communities may rely on specialized consulting firms to promote or restrict market access. Typical consulting services include (1) mapping disease progression and costs (e.g., economic, clinical, and humanistic); (2) identifying value-drivers and building those into new products, services, and solutions; (3) ensuring payment mechanisms are in place to facilitate commerce (e.g., diagnostic codes [e.g., International Classification of Diseases also known as ICD-9 and ICD-10], insurance billing codes [e.g., Current Procedural Terminology also known as CPT or HCPCS Level I codes, Healthcare Common Procedure Coding System Level II codes also known as HCPCS II codes], value-based contracts [VBCs], outcomes-based compensation [OBC] agreements; (4) ensuring measurement systems are in place to assess value (e.g., validated instruments that generate real-world data [RWD] and real-world evidence [RWE]); (5) building the case for coverage, coding, reimbursement, value-based contracts (VBC), outcomes-based compensation (OBC), real-world data (RWD) and real-world evidence (RWE) collaborations; (6) establishing inter-organizational learning systems to create feedback loops on value; and (7) advocating for expanded market access.

Many health industry stakeholders now apply advanced data science methods to (1) define and measure value and (2) expand or restrict market access based on value. The need to share real-world data (RWD) and generate real-world evidence (RWE) creates new demands on legislators and regulatory policymakers, as new types of collaboration become essential. The U.S. Food and Drug Administration (FDA) has issued new guidance for drugs and biologics as well as medical devices, along with a framework for real-world evidence programs. The U.S. government apparently sees value in accelerating development of real-world scientific evidence for medical products within the existing U.S. regulatory framework.

== Market access tools ==
Market Access Map

Market Access Map is a versatile tool which provides information on applied customs tariffs including MFN tariffs and preferences granted unilaterally and reciprocally in the framework of regional and bilateral trade agreements. Users can find ad valorem equivalents (AVEs) for non-ad valorem duties in order to compare tariffs across countries and simulate tariff reduction scenarios. The application also covers tariff rate quotas, trade remedies, rules of origin as well as corresponding documentation, bound tariffs of WTO members, non-tariff measures (NTMs) and trade flows to help users prioritize and analyse export markets as well as prepare for market access negotiations.

Rules of Origin Facilitator

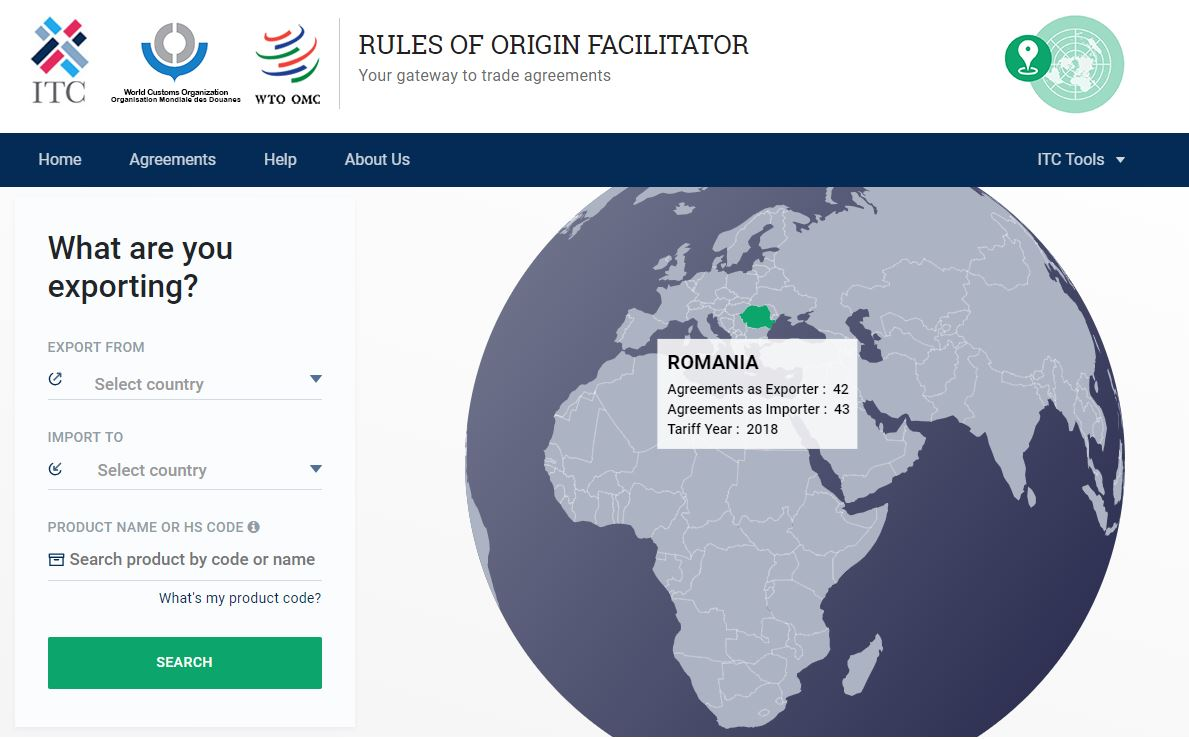
The Rules of Origin Facilitator helps users to qualify to origin requirements to gain market access to destination markets.

The Rules of Origin Facilitator provides free access to ITC’s database of rules of origin and origin-related documentation in hundreds of trade agreements. The Facilitator is combined with the tariff and trade agreement databases underlying the Market Access Map. This enables companies (particularly ones from developing countries) to benefit from trade agreements worldwide. The Facilitator currently contains data for more than 250 FTAs applied by more than 190 countries. This database is expanding, with the ultimate goal to cover over 400 FTAs and preferential schemes that are currently active in the world.

The Facilitator aims to help small and medium sized enterprises to increase trade by taking advantage of global trade opportunities in the form of low duty rates under trade agreements. The tool can also be used by policymakers, trade negotiators, economists as well as various other users. Any user can simply look for information on origin criteria, other origin provisions, and trade documentation by entering the HS code of their product.

Tariff Analysis Online Tariff Analysis Online is a facility developed by the WTO to assist researching and analyzing tariff data maintained in two WTO databases: the Integrated Database (IDB, containing general information on applied tariffs and imports), and Consolidated Tariff Schedules (CTS, including members’ binding commitments on maximum tariffs). The information in this facility has been made available to the public since February 2010, following a decision of the Market Access Committee which allowed public access to the two databases.

I-TIP Services I-TIP Services is a joint initiative of the WTO and the World Bank (WB). It combines a set of linked databases that provide information on Members' commitments under the GATS, and preferential services commitments in FTAs, together with information on applied measures in services, and statistics on services trade.

== Other useful databases and information portals on market access ==
- WTO's Gateway on Market Access for Goods, a comprehensive portal providing information and documents on MFN market access for goods.
- UNCTAD, ITC, WTO, WB and other partners' TRAINS, a global database on Non-Tariff Measures based on official regulations.
- ITC's Non-Tariff Measures Business Survey, a database including regulatory and procedural obstacles that trading companies face both at home and abroad.
- ITC's Standards Map, a portal covering more than 230 standards initiatives applicable to more than 80 sectors and 180 countries.
- EU's Market Access Database, a portal equipping EU exporters with information about import conditions in third country markets.
- US' International Trade Administration, a practical business tool helping US traders to export, connect with foreign buyers, and expand operations in new markets.
