= Closer Economic Relations =

Australia–New Zealand free trade agreement

Australia–New Zealand Closer Economic Relations Trade Agreement
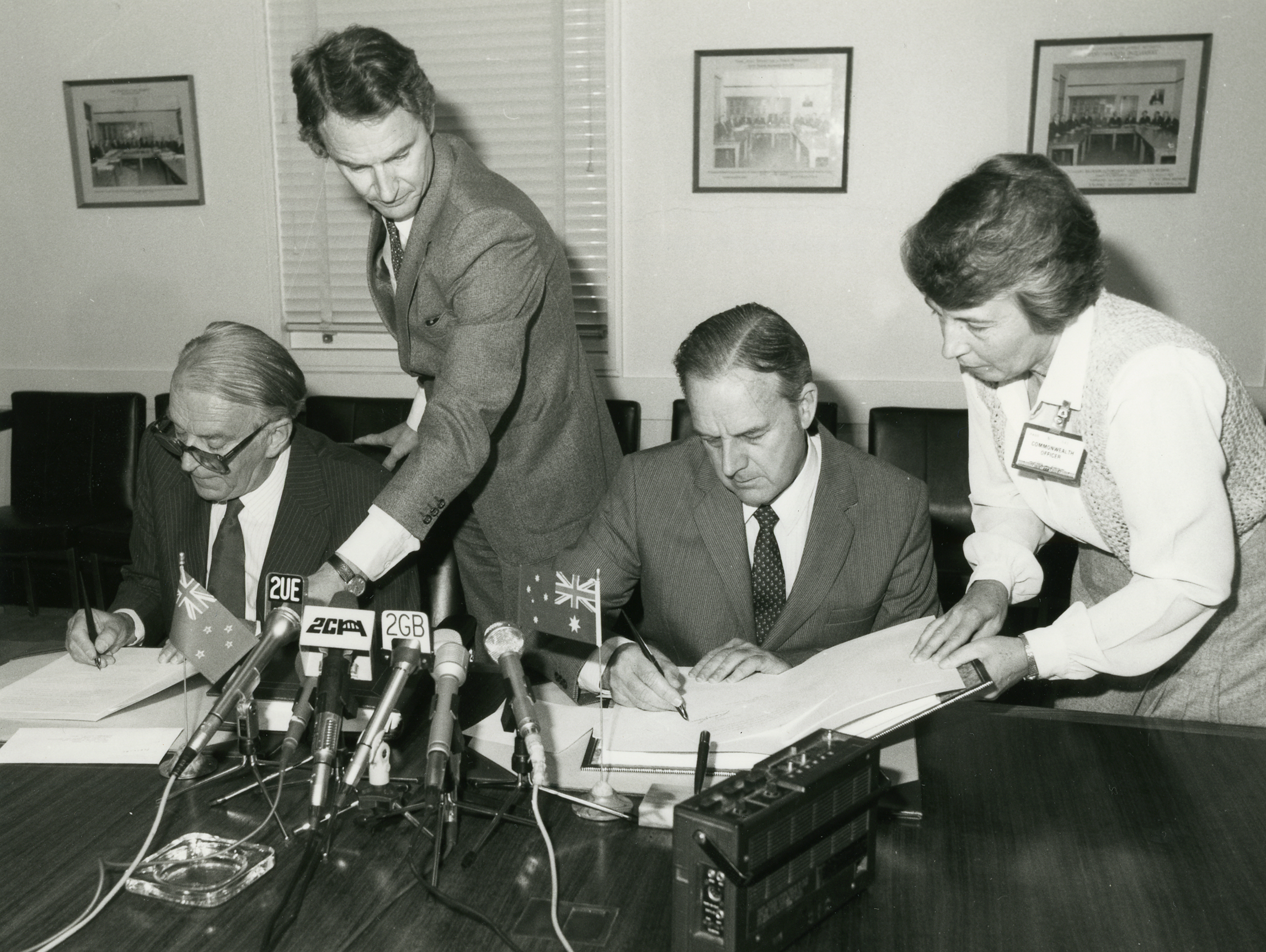
- Lionel Bowen and Laurie Francis signing the agreement 28 March 1983
- Type: Trade agreement
- Signed: 28 March 1983
- Location: Canberra, Australia
- Effective: 1 January 1983
- Parties: Australia; New Zealand

The Australia–New Zealand Closer Economic Relations Trade Agreement, commonly known as Closer Economic Relations (CER), is a free trade agreement between Australia and New Zealand. It came into force on 1 January 1983, but the actual treaty was not signed until 28 March 1983 by the Deputy Prime Minister of Australia and Minister for Trade, Lionel Bowen and the New Zealand High Commissioner to Australia, Laurie Francis in Canberra, Australia. This was because Malcolm Fraser and Robert Muldoon hated each other personally to such an extent that they refused to ratify the agreement if the other was there.

== Overview ==
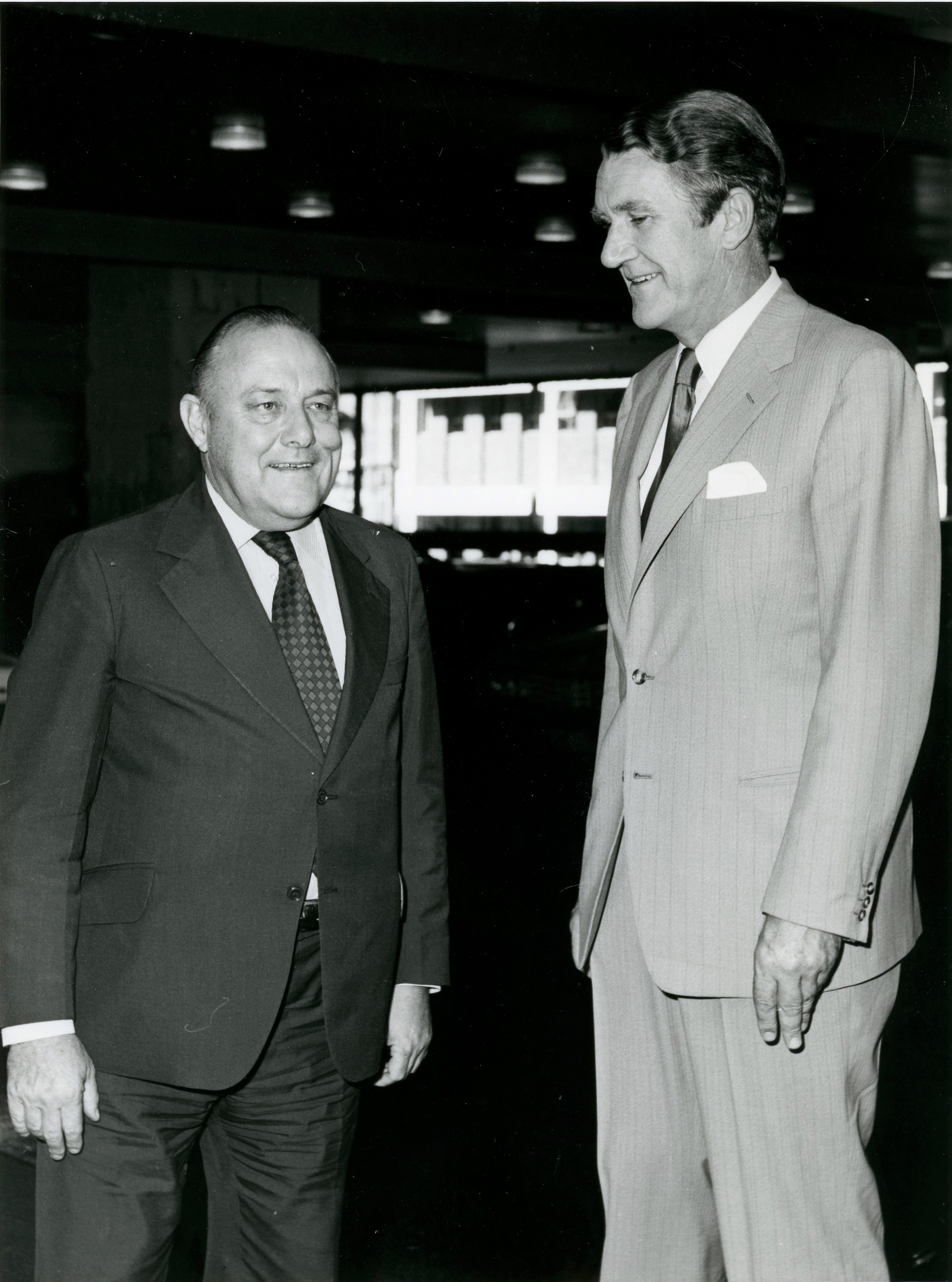
Prime Ministers Robert Muldoon (New Zealand) and Malcolm Fraser (Australia)

CER built on the earlier New Zealand Australia Free Trade Agreement (NAFTA), which was signed on 31 August 1965 and came into force on 1 January 1966. NAFTA had removed four-fifths of the tariffs between the two countries and quantitative restrictions on trade across the Tasman Sea. However, it came to be seen as too complex and bureaucratic, and in March 1980, a joint Prime Ministerial communiqué was released that called for "closer economic relations".

Behind-the-scenes preparation for the 1980 communiqué was managed by a joint task force of civil servants, led on the New Zealand side by the Officials Economic Committee (OEC) under the chairmanship of Secretary to the Treasury Noel Lough. Documents from the 1978–1979 preliminary talks show that the OEC pushed to abandon the restrictive, item-by-item trade structures of the 1965 New Zealand Australia Free Trade Agreement (NAFTA) in favor of a comprehensive "all goods" approach. This blueprint encountered friction from Australian Treasury officials who opposed New Zealand's insistence on a gradualist, linear phasing-out of its protective domestic import licensing system.

The two major sticking points in the negotiations were New Zealand's wish for better access for its dairy products in Australia and Australia's wish for New Zealand to remove export incentives and quantitative restrictions. After the two hurdles were overcome, the Heads of Agreement was signed on 14 December 1982 and came into force on 1 January of the following year.

One of the most important results of CER was the Protocol on the Acceleration of Free Trade in Goods, which resulted in the total elimination of tariffs or quantitative restrictions between the two countries by 1 July 1990, five years ahead of schedule.

Other parts of CER include:

- A good that can be legally sold in one country can also be legally sold in the other. Anyone registered to practise an occupation in one country may practise in the other (with some exemptions including medical practitioners)
- Service providers may provide services in either country (except in certain areas such as airway services)

The CER is complementary to the Trans-Tasman Travel Arrangement.

== Future prospects ==
Monthly value of Australian merchandise exports to New Zealand (A$ millions) since 1988

Monthly value of New Zealand merchandise exports to Australia (A$ millions) since 1988

Addressing the New Zealand Parliament in February 2011, Australian Prime Minister Julia Gillard said:

Now it's time to write the next chapter as we journey towards a Single Economic Market.

During my visit, I've been pleased to discuss with Prime Minister Key the excellent progress being achieved on the SmartGate project to create borderless travel between our two countries.

A joint study will commence this month to examine how we create a truly "domestic-like" aviation experience.

== See also ==
- Australia–Chile Free Trade Agreement
- Australia–United States Free Trade Agreement
- Australia–United Kingdom Free Trade Agreement
- Comprehensive Economic Partnership for East Asia
- Foreign relations of Australia
- Foreign relations of New Zealand
