= List of tariffs in Canada =

List of tariffs in Canada

== 1800–1900 ==
- 1855–1866: Canadian–American Reciprocity Treaty
- 1858: Cayley–Galt Tariff
- 1879: The National Policy introduced

== 1900–2000 ==
- 1945: Bretton Woods Agreement
- 1947: General Agreement on Tariffs and Trade
- 1963–1967: Kennedy round of GATT
- 1965: Canada–United States Automotive Products Agreement (Auto Pact)
- 1973–1979: Tokyo round of GATT
- 1988: Canada–United States Free Trade Agreement
- 1993: North American Free Trade Agreement (NAFTA)
- 1994: World Trade Organization created
- 1997: Canada–Israel Free Trade Agreement (CIFTA)
- 1997: Canada–Chile Free Trade Agreement (CCFTA)
- 1997: Canadian Copyright Act Part VIII, "Private Copying" (Non-government Tariff, see Canadian Private Copying Collective)

== 2000–present ==
- 2001: Canada–Costa Rica Free Trade Agreement (CCRFTA)
- 2002: Free Trade Area of the Americas (FTAA)
- 2006: Trade, Investment, and Labour Mobility Agreement between British Columbia and Alberta (TILMA)
- 2020: United States–Mexico–Canada Agreement (USMCA)
- 2024: Canada–China trade war
- 2025: United States trade war with Canada
