= Wonnacott =

Wonnacott is a surname. Notable people with the surname include:

- John Wonnacott (born 1940), English painter
- Paul Wonnacott (born 1933), American economist and writer
- Ronald J. Wonnacott (1930–2018), Canadian economist
- Tim Wonnacott (born 1951), English television presenter, auctioneer and antiques expert
