= Eads =

Eads or EADS may refer to:

== People ==
- Christine Eads, American radio host
- George Eads (born 1967), American actor
- George C. Eads (born 1942), American economist
- James Buchanan Eads (1820–1887), American engineer and inventor
- Joshua Allen Eads (born 1984), American drag queen known as Ginger Minj
- Lance Eads (born 1968), American politician from Arkansas
- Lucy Tayiah Eads (1888–1961), Native American chief
- M. Adela Eads (1920–2003), American politician from Connecticut
- Robert Eads (1945–1999), American trans man
- Wendell Eads (1923–1997), American jockey

== Places ==
United States

- Eads, Colorado
- Eads, Tennessee

== Other uses ==
- Eastern Air Defense Sector, a United States Air Force Air Combat Command
- European Aeronautic Defence and Space Company, now Airbus

== See also ==
- EAD (disambiguation)
