= Reciprocity (Canadian politics) =

Term in Canadian politics for free trade with the United States

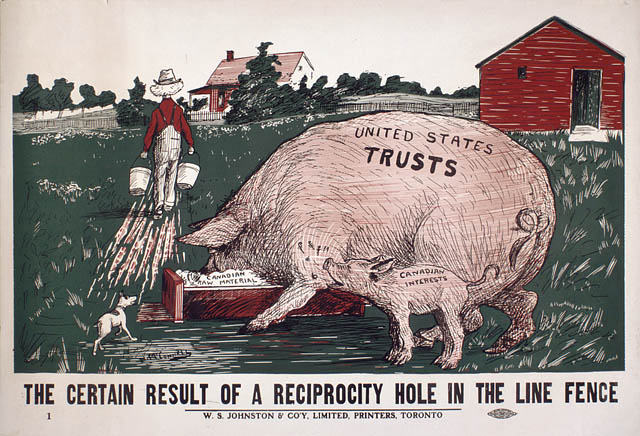
A 1911 Conservative campaign poster warns that the big American pig will gobble up the benefits of reciprocity, proposed by the Liberals.

Reciprocity, in 19th- and early 20th-century Canadian politics, meant free trade, the removal of protective tariffs on all natural resources between Canada and the United States. Reciprocity and free trade have been emotional issues in Canadian history, as they pitted two conflicting impulses: the desire for beneficial economic ties with the United States and the fear of closer economic ties leading to American domination and even annexation.

== 1880s to 1910s ==
After Confederation, reciprocity was initially promoted as an alternative to Prime Minister John A. Macdonald's National Policy. Reciprocity meant that there would be no protective tariffs on all natural resources being imported and exported between Canada and the United States. That would allow prairie grain farmers to both have access to the larger American market and make more money on their exports.

In the 1890s, it also meant that Western Canadian farmers could obtain access to cheaper American farm machinery and manufactured goods, which otherwise had to be obtained at higher prices from Central Canada.

In the 1891 election, the Liberal Party of Canada ran on a reciprocity platform. It lost to Macdonald who won with his nationalist slogan, "The Old Flag, The Old Policy, The Old Leader." The Liberals temporarily shelved the concept.

When reciprocity came up again, in 1896, it was the Americans who proposed it to Wilfrid Laurier's Liberals. The idea still excited them, and they immediately began to campaign for it. Despite their general belief it would benefit Canada, the Conservatives campaigned against it.

The Liberals went on to win the 1896 election and negotiated an elaborate reciprocity agreement with the United States in 1911. However, in the 1911 election reciprocity again became a major issue, with the Conservatives saying that it would be a "sellout" to the United States. The Liberals were defeated by the Conservatives whose slogan was "No truck or trade with the Yankees."

== 1980s ==
The concept of reciprocity with the United States was revived in 1985 when the Royal Commission on the Economic Union and Development Prospects for Canada headed by former Liberal Minister of Finance Donald S. Macdonald issued a report, calling for free trade with the US. The Progressive Conservatives, under Brian Mulroney, acted on the recommendation by negotiating the Canada–United States Free Trade Agreement. They won the 1988 election on the issue.

== See also ==
- Canadian–American Reciprocity Treaty of 1855.
- National Policy
- Continentalism
- 2025 United States trade war with Canada and Mexico
