= Carolyn Rouse =

American anthropologist

- Education: Swarthmore College (BA); University of Southern California (MA, PhD)
- Occupations: Anthropologist, filmmaker, professor
- Employer: Princeton University
- Title: Professor and Chair of the Department of Anthropology

Carolyn Moxley Rouse (born c. 1965) is an American anthropologist, professor and filmmaker. She is Professor and Chair of the Department of Anthropology at Princeton University and president of the American Anthropological Association.

== Biography ==
Rouse grew up in Del Mar, California, the daughter of a physicist (her father, Carl A. Rouse) and a psychologist (her mother, Lorraine). She encountered discrimination at an early age as her family was prevented from buying a home in Rancho Santa Fe because of their race.

Rouse attended Swarthmore College, graduating in 1987. In her junior year, she studied abroad in Kenya in a program focused on wildlife biology, but found she was much more interested in the people around her, which prompted a turn toward documentary film, then eventually a master's in visual anthropology and a Ph.D. in anthropology from the University of Southern California.

Rouse's siblings are both academics; her brother is a professor of physics and her sister, Cecilia Rouse, is the Katzman-Ernst Professor in Economics and Education, and professor of economics and public affairs at Princeton University. Cecilia was also the Dean of the Princeton School of Public and International Affairs before stepping down from that position to serve as the Chair of the Council of Economic Advisers for the Biden administration. Rouse's brother-in-law (Cecilia's husband) is Ford Morrison, son of Nobel Prize-winning author and Princeton professor emeritus Toni Morrison.

== Research interests ==
Rouse has studied racial inequality in religion, medicine, education, and economic development.

== Bibliography ==
- Engaged Surrender: African American Women and Islam (University of California Press, 2004)
- Uncertain Suffering: Racial Healthcare Disparities and Sickle Cell Disease (University of California Press, 2009)
- Televised Redemption: Black Religious Media and Racial Empowerment with John L. Jackson, Jr., and Marla F. Frederick (NYU Press, 2017)
- Development Hubris: Adventures Trying to Save the World (forthcoming)

== Filmography ==
- Chicks in White Satin (1994)
- Purification to Prozac: Treating Mental Illness in Bali (1998)
- Listening as a Radical Act: World Anthropologies and the Decentering of Western Thought (2015)
