= Commodity currency =

Currency moving with commodity prices

A commodity currency is a currency that co-moves with the world prices of primary commodity products, due to these countries' heavy dependency on the export of certain raw materials for income. Commodity currencies are most prevalent in developing countries (e.g. Burundi, Tanzania, Papua New Guinea). In the foreign exchange market, commodity currencies generally refer to the New Zealand dollar, Norwegian krone, South African rand, Brazilian real, Russian ruble and the Chilean peso. Commodity currencies' nature can allow foreign exchange traders to more accurately gauge a currency's value, and predict movements within markets based on the perceived value of the correlated commodity.

== Effects ==
Because commodity currencies are tied so closely to specific goods, this connection can be a double-edged sword for a country's economy. While any nation usually experiences deflation when exports fall and inflation when they rise, these swings are much more severe for commodity-dependent countries because the value of their exports relies heavily on just a few specific products.

=== Positive ===
According to a 2009 study on commodity currency titled "Can Exchange Rates Forecast Commodity Prices?" by Yu-Chin Chen, Kenneth Rogoff and Barbara Rossi, exchange rates of commodity currencies can predict future global commodity prices. This is hugely beneficial for economists and policymakers who want a reliable measure of future commodity prices.

A currency that is naturally tied to a country's major commodities can be beneficial if global demand for a commodity increases, naturally strengthening the value of the currency. As seen in Figure 1, as the demand for a commodity shifts out (higher demand) the price increases to p'. This increased demand also is likely to increase GDP, as more exports take place as demonstrated by the equation for GDP below.

- GDP = C + G + I + N_{x}
- C = consumption
- G= government expenditure
- I = investment
- N_{x} = net exports = exports − imports

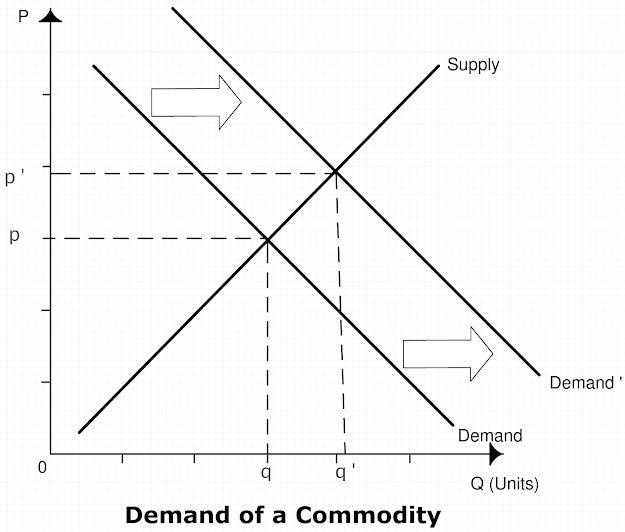
Figure 1

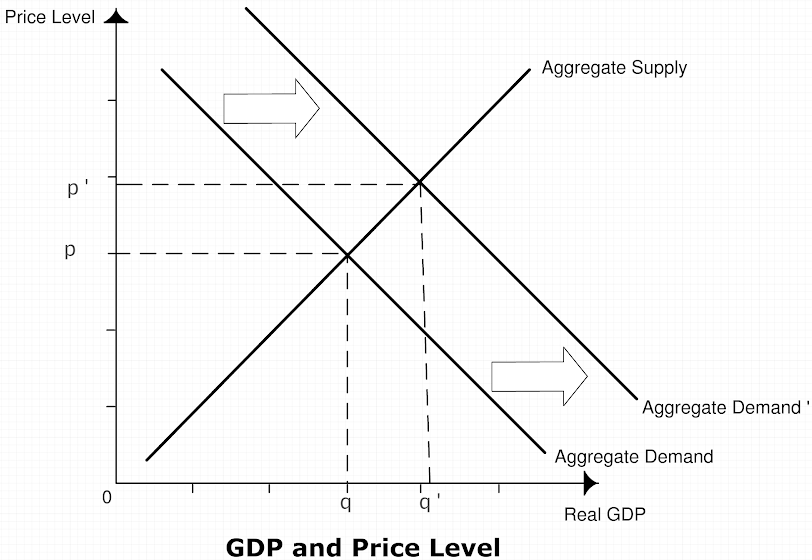
Figure 2

As exports increase due to higher demand, GDP will also increase greatly as this country relies heavily on this commodity, leading to higher prices causing inflation (indicated in Figure 2's increase in the price level). Depending on whether the inflation is economically beneficial, this could be positive (see Inflation).

While countries with commodity currencies benefit from higher demand, countries that import this commodity face the opposite effects.

=== Negative ===
On the other side, a currency being tied to the major commodities of a country can be problematic, as a decrease in demand for any specific commodity can take a huge toll on the country's currency, leading to deflation.

As seen in Figure 3, as the demand for a commodity shifts in (less demand) the quantity decreases to q'. This decreased demand is likely to decrease GDP, as less exporting takes place, as demonstrated by the equation for GDP below.

- GDP = C + G + I + N_{x}
- C = consumption
- G = government expenditure
- I = investment
- N_{x} = net exports = exports − imports

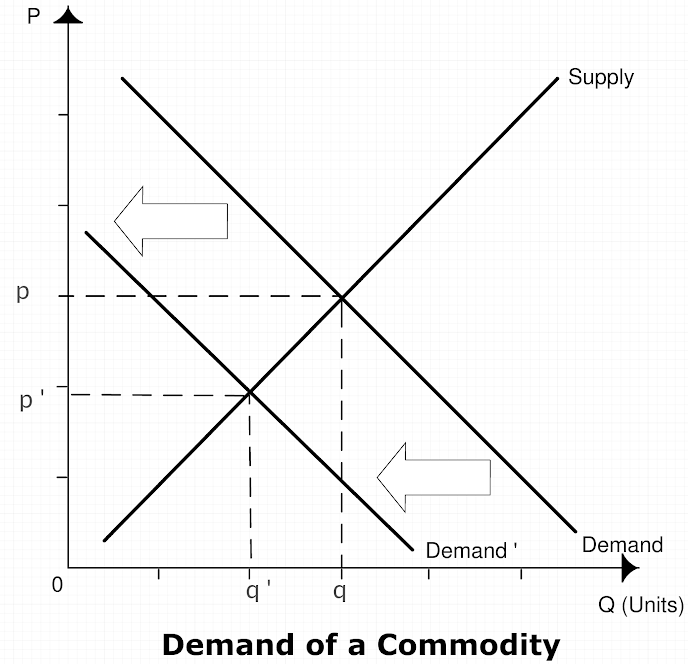
Figure 3

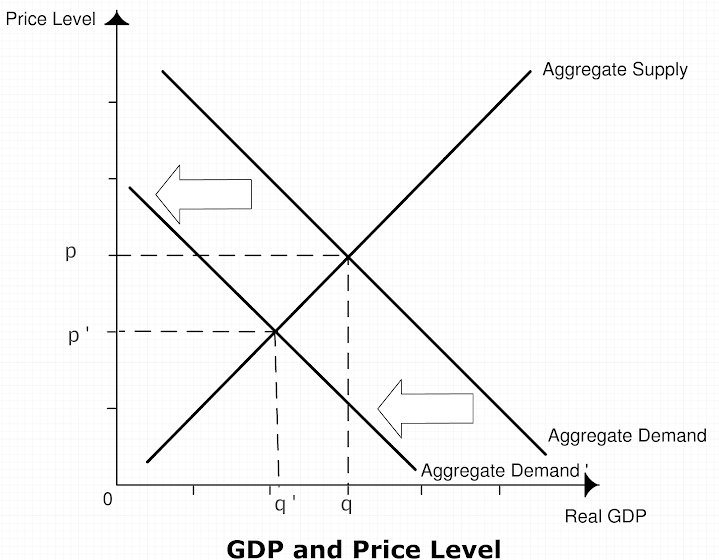
Figure 4

Similar to the reasoning in the previous section, as seen in Figure 4, a decrease in GDP leads to deflation. This can have negative or positive effects, depending on whether the nation's currency was overvalued or undervalued. Deflation can either be positive or negative in the long run as suggested by the effects section of the deflation article.

While countries with commodity currencies benefit from higher demand of a commodity, countries that import this commodity face the opposite effects.

== Externalities ==
Most commodities that are tied to currencies are natural resources such as gold, oil, timber and other minerals. However, the mining of these raw resources can lead to immense externalities such as pollution. Countries whose currencies do not hinge on commodity price movements are generally more willing to minimize harmful environmental processes, thus reducing affiliated externalities.

Countries whose currencies are impacted profoundly by commodities are generally less willing to tighten their environmental policies which would reduce externalities. For example, the Canadian dollar is closely tied to soybeans and oil. The production of oil is extremely harmful to the environment. However, reducing oil production through cap-and-trade programs or production taxes can be devastating to the Canadian dollar.

== See also ==
- Gold standard
- Silver standard
- Hard currency
- Private currency
- Representative money
- Reserve currency
- Commodity money
