= Richard Burkhauser =

American economist (Cornell University)

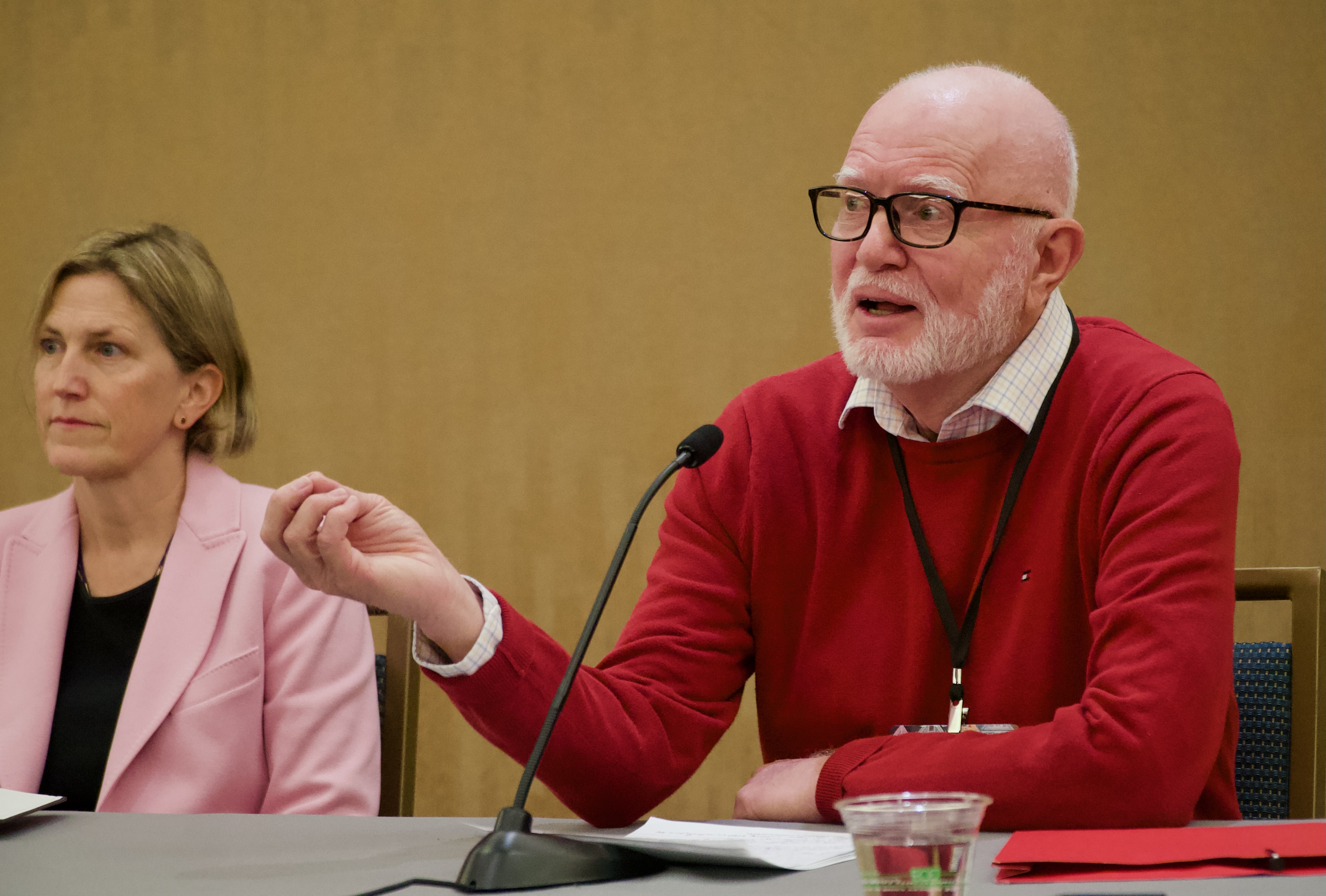

Member of the Council of Economic Advisers
- In office September 15, 2017 – May 22, 2019
- President: Donald Trump
- Preceded by: Jay Shambaugh
- Succeeded by: Tyler Goodspeed

Personal details
- Party: Republican
- Education: Saint Vincent College (BA); Rutgers University (MA); University of Chicago (PhD)

Richard Valentine Burkhauser is an American economist who is professor emeritus of policy analysis at Cornell University. He was a member of the Council of Economic Advisers (CEA) for President Trump. Burkhauser's research often focuses on how public policies affect the economic well-being of vulnerable populations, such as the elderly, the disabled, and those living in low-income households. As a member of the CEA, Burkhauser worked alongside fellow economists Tomas Philipson and Kevin Hassett.

Since 1977, Burkhauser has written seventeen books and many book reviews, articles, and government publications. Burkhauser has often presented his research findings on the consequences of disability policy to congressional committees and other government agencies.
