= Christopher Phelan =

American economist (born 1963)

33rd Chair of the Council of Economic Advisers
- Incumbent
- Assumed office August 10, 2026
- President: Donald Trump
- Preceded by: Pierre Yared (acting)

Vice Chair of the Council of Economic Advisers
- In office July 6, 2026 – August 10, 2026
- President: Donald Trump
- Preceded by: Pierre Yared
- Succeeded by: Vacant

Personal details
- Born: Christopher James Phelan; February 1963 (age 63)
- Education: Duke University (BA); University of Chicago (MA, PhD)

Christopher James Phelan (born February 1963) is an American economist, academic, and U.S. government official whose research focuses on macroeconomic theory, monetary economics, limited government commitment, and reputation. He is a professor in the Department of Economics at the University of Minnesota, where he served as department chair from 2012 to 2021. Phelan serves as Chairman of the Council of Economic Advisers (CEA) in the Executive Office of the President of the United States, succeeding Acting Chairman Pierre Yared.

Prior to his nomination for the Council's chairmanship by President Donald Trump in April 2026, Phelan served at the Federal Reserve Bank of Minneapolis in various capacities, including as a senior economist and most recently as a consultant to the Research Department. He is a research associate at the National Bureau of Economic Research (NBER), and elected fellow of the Econometric Society and the Society of the Advancement of Economic Theory.

== Early life and education ==
Phelan was born in February 1963, the youngest of six children. He received a Bachelor of Arts (B.A.) in economics and computer science from Duke University and earned a Master of Arts (A.M.) in economics and a Ph.D. in economics from the University of Chicago, working under the supervision of economist Robert Townsend for his doctoral dissertation.

== Academic career ==
Phelan was a faculty member at the University of Wisconsin–Madison and Northwestern University Kellogg Graduate School of Management before joining the University of Minnesota. He was named a full professor in 2007 and served as department chair from 2012 to 2021. He was also interim director of the Heller-Hurwicz Economics Institute (HHEI) in 2024–2025.

Phelan joined the Federal Reserve Bank of Minneapolis as a staff economist in 1998. He later served as senior economist and consultant to the Research Department before leaving following his 2026 nomination to the Council of Economic Advisers.

== Research focus ==
Phelan's research focuses on dynamic macroeconomic theory, particularly the role of private information, incentives, government commitment, and financial institutions in shaping economic outcomes. His research can be broadly divided into three areas: incentive theory and dynamic contracting, government commitment and reputation, and banking and monetary policy.

=== Incentive theory and dynamic contracting ===
Phelan's early work developed recursive methods for solving dynamic contracting problems with private information. His research with Robert Townsend showed how incentive-compatible allocations could be characterized recursively, making complex dynamic contracts computationally tractable. Subsequent work analyzed repeated moral hazard, limited commitment, and environments with history-dependent private information, extending recursive techniques to a broader class of contracting problems, demonstrating that some dynamic incentive problems require additional state variables and "threat-keeping" constraints to sustain incentive-compatible contracts. Phelan has also studied inequality and intergenerational mobility, analyzing how incentive constraints within dynamic economies can generate persistent differences in income and wealth across generations.

=== Government commitment and reputation ===
Another major area of Phelan’s research examines the credibility of government policy when governments cannot fully commit to future actions and how reputation can influence taxation, public trust, and sovereign borrowing over time. His work with Ennio Stacchetti characterized self-enforcing Ramsey taxation under limited commitment, while later research analyzed how governments establish and maintain reputations for honoring policies despite incentives to renege. Subsequent work with Manuel Amador extended these ideas to sovereign borrowing, studying how default affects a government's reputation and future access to credit markets.

=== Banking and monetary policy ===
Phelan has also conducted research on banking and monetary economics, examining the role of financial institutions, regulation, and monetary policy in promoting financial stability. His work has analyzed the economic role of fractional-reserve banking, arguing that while private deposit systems can improve risk sharing, they may also generate socially costly externalities through bank runs and price-level effects. He has also studied the design of monetary policy frameworks, showing how central bank commitments to exchange government liabilities for money can create self-fulfilling speculative runs and inflationary pressures, particularly in the presence of large excess reserves. His 2026 work on central bank reputation with Manuel Amador examined how central banks with uncertain inflation preferences can credibly signal their type when actions are only imperfectly reflected in observed outcomes.

== Government service ==
On April 21, 2026, Phelan was nominated by President Donald Trump to serve as Chairman of the Council of Economic Advisers (CEA), succeeding Acting Chairman Pierre Yared. His nomination was referred to the U.S. Senate Committee on Banking, Housing, and Urban Affairs, which held a confirmation hearing on June 25, 2026, and voted to advance his nomination on July 23, 2026. Phelan served as Vice Chairman of the Council from July 2026 until he was confirmed by the United States Senate for chairmanship on August 7, 2026.

Phelan described the role of the Council as “a voice of sober facts and economic analysis,” stating that any administration should maintain a source of nonpartisan and apolitical economic analysis.

== Views ==
Phelan expressed support for the Compact for Academic Excellence in Higher Education after the University of Minnesota's senate voted to oppose the compact.

Political offices
Preceded by Pierre Yared; Acting	Chair of the Council of Economic Advisers; 2026–present	Incumbent
