= Cayley–Galt Tariff =

The Cayley–Galt Tariff of 1858 was the first protective tariff in the history of Canada. It imposed duties on fully-manufactured goods of 20% and a duty of 10% on partially-manufactured goods in an attempt to spur the domestic manufacturing industries.

The tariff caused immediate resentment in both the United Kingdom and the United States. The Americans' anger played an important role in their 1866 repeal of the Canadian–American Reciprocity Treaty, which had led to free trade in natural resources.

The tariff was only a foretaste of the much broader system of protection, which would be set up by the National Policy in 1879.

== Sources ==
- W.T. Easterbrook and H.G.J. Aitken. Canadian Economic History (Toronto, 1988)
