= Cecilia Rouse =

American economist (born 1963)

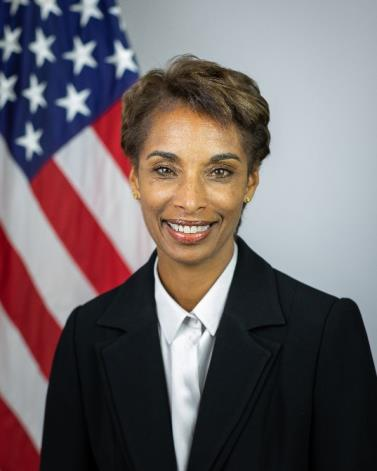
- Official portrait, 2021

President of the Brookings Institution
- Incumbent
- Assumed office January 2, 2024
- Preceded by: Amy Liu (acting)

30th Chair of the Council of Economic Advisers
- In office March 12, 2021 – March 31, 2023
- President: Joe Biden
- Preceded by: Tyler Goodspeed (Acting)
- Succeeded by: Jared Bernstein

Member of the Council of Economic Advisers
- In office March 11, 2009 – February 28, 2011
- President: Barack Obama
- Preceded by: Donald B. Marron Jr.
- Succeeded by: Katharine Abraham

Personal details
- Born: Cecilia Elena Rouse; December 18, 1963 (age 62) Walnut Creek, California, U.S.
- Party: Democratic
- Children: 2
- Relatives: Carl A. Rouse (father); Carolyn Rouse (sister)
- Education: Harvard University (BA, MA, PhD)

Academic work
- Discipline: Economics
- Institutions: Princeton University

Cecilia Elena Rouse (/ˈraʊs/ ROWSS; born December 18, 1963) is an American economist and the President of the Brookings Institution. She served as the 30th Chair of the Council of Economic Advisers between 2021 and 2023. She is the first Black American to hold this position. Prior to this, she served as the dean of the Princeton School of Public and International Affairs at Princeton University. Joe Biden nominated Rouse to be Chair of the Council of Economic Advisers in November 2020. Rouse was overwhelmingly confirmed by the Senate on March 2, 2021, by a vote of 95–4. She resigned on March 31, 2023, to return to teaching. In January 2024, she became the 9th President of the Brookings Institution.

== Early life and education ==
Rouse grew up in Del Mar, California, and graduated from Torrey Pines High School in 1981. She has two siblings: Forest Rouse, a physicist; and Carolyn Rouse, an anthropologist and professor at Princeton University. Her father Carl A. Rouse was a research physicist who received his Ph.D. from the California Institute of Technology in 1956. Her mother Lorraine worked as a school psychologist.

Rouse received a Bachelor of Arts in economics from Harvard University in 1986 and a Ph.D. in economics from Harvard University in 1992.

== Career ==
After earning her doctorate, Rouse joined the faculty at Princeton University in 1992.

Rouse served in the National Economic Council under President Bill Clinton from 1998 to 1999.

Rouse served as a member of President Barack Obama's Council of Economic Advisers from 2009 to 2011.

Rouse has served as the dean of the Princeton School of Public and International Affairs, and is the Lawrence and Shirley Katzman and Lewis and Anna Ernst Professor in the Economics of Education. She is the founding director of the Princeton University Education Research Section, is a member of the National Academy of Education and a research associate of the National Bureau of Economic Research. She was elected to the National Academy of Sciences in 2024. Her primary research interests are in labor economics with a focus on the economics of education. Rouse has served as an editor of the Journal of Labor Economics and as a senior editor of The Future of Children. She was a member of the board of directors of MDRC, and a director of the T. Rowe Price Equity Mutual Funds and an advisory board member of the T. Rowe Price Fixed Income Mutual Funds.

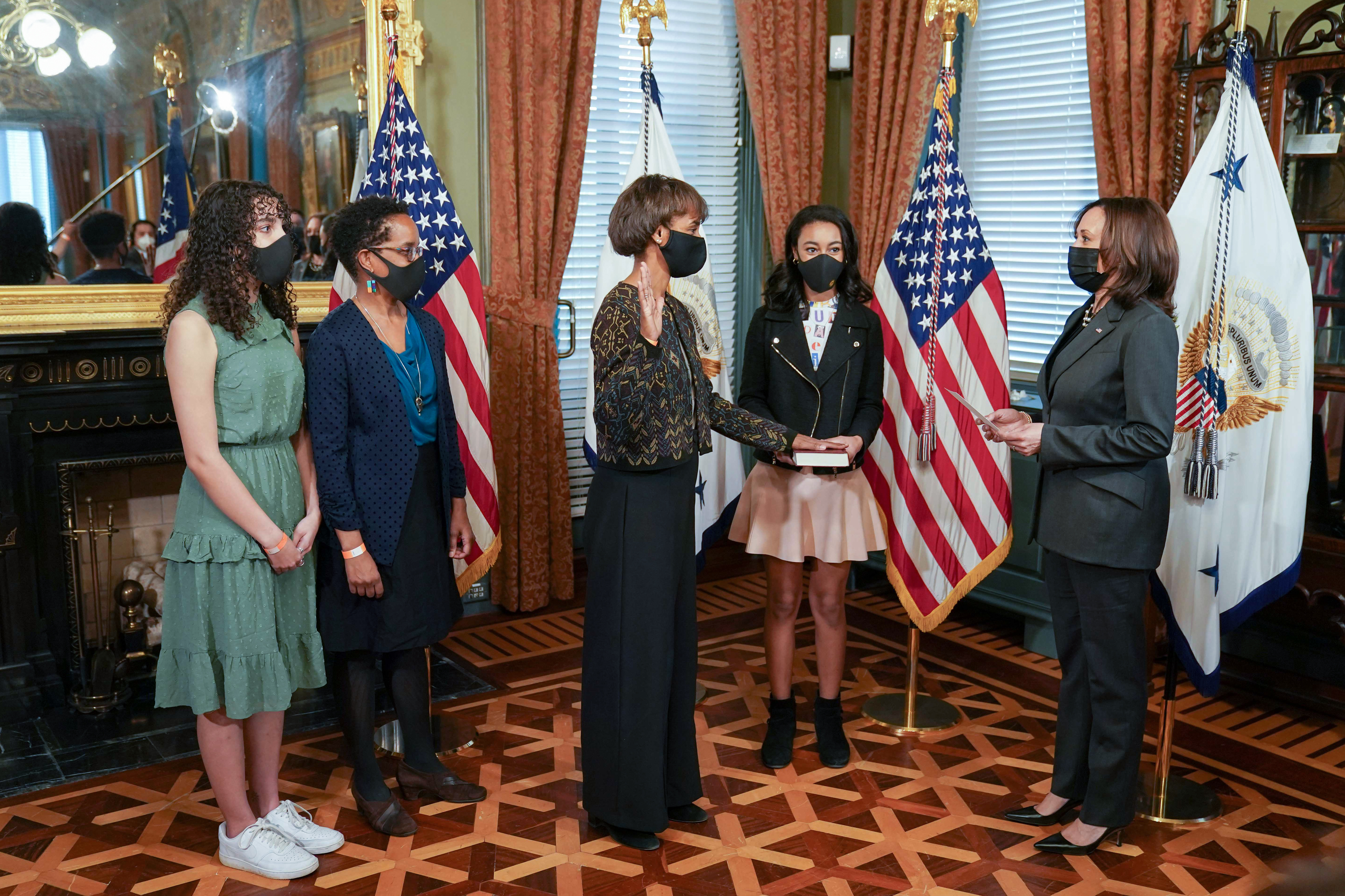
Rouse sworn in as the Chair of the White House Council of Economic Advisors by Vice President Kamala Harris.

=== Biden administration ===
President Joe Biden nominated Rouse to become Chair of the Council of Economic Advisers. The Senate Banking Committee held hearings on her nomination on January 28, 2021. On February 4, 2021, the committee favorably reported Rouse's nomination to the Senate floor. The Senate confirmed Rouse by a vote of 95–4 on March 2, 2021.

In November 2022, it was announced that Rouse would be leaving her position as Chair of the Council of Economic Advisers following the 2022 midterms. In February 2023, Jared Bernstein was nominated as her successor by President Biden.

== Selected publications ==
- Goldin, Claudia; Rouse, Cecilia (2000). "Orchestrating Impartiality: The Impact of "Blind" Auditions on Female Musicians". American Economic Review. 90 (4): 715–741. doi:10.1257/aer.90.4.715. S2CID 16026987.
- Kane, Thomas J.; Rouse, Cecilia Elena (1995). "Labor-market returns to two-and four-year college". The American Economic Review. 85 (3): 600–614. Abstract.
- Rouse, Cecilia Elena (1998). "Private school vouchers and student achievement: An evaluation of the Milwaukee Parental Choice Program". The Quarterly Journal of Economics. 113 (2): 553–602. doi:10.1162/003355398555685. S2CID 55948629.
- Ashenfelter, Orley; Rouse, Cecilia (1998). "Income, schooling, and ability: Evidence from a new sample of identical twins" (PDF). The Quarterly Journal of Economics. 113 (1): 253–284. doi:10.1162/003355398555577. S2CID 154890265.
- Kane, Thomas J.; Rouse, Cecilia Elena (1999). "The community college: Educating students at the margin between college and work". The Journal of Economic Perspectives. 13 (1): 63–84. doi:10.1257/jep.13.1.63.
- Rouse, Cecilia Elena (1995). "Democratization or diversion? The effect of community colleges on educational attainment". Journal of Business & Economic Statistics. 13 (2): 217–224. doi:10.1080/07350015.1995.10524596.
- Figlio, David N.; Rouse, Cecilia Elena (2006). "Do accountability and voucher threats improve low-performing schools?" (PDF). Journal of Public Economics. 90 (1): 239–255. doi:10.1016/j.jpubeco.2005.08.005. S2CID 59319503.

== See also ==
- List of African-American United States Cabinet members
- List of female United States Cabinet members

Political offices
Preceded by Tyler Goodspeed; Acting	Chair of the Council of Economic Advisers; 2021–2023	Succeeded by Jared Bernstein
