= Tyler Goodspeed =

American economist (born 1984/85)

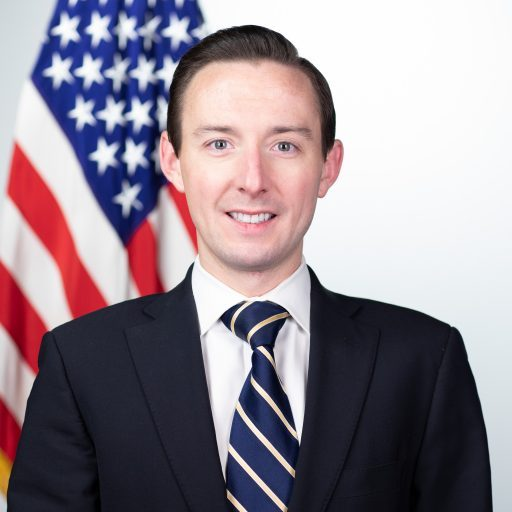
- Official portrait, 2020

Chair of the Council of Economic Advisers
- Acting
- In office June 23, 2020 – January 7, 2021
- President: Donald Trump
- Preceded by: Tomas J. Philipson (Acting)
- Succeeded by: Cecilia Rouse

Member of the Council of Economic Advisers
- In office May 22, 2019 – January 7, 2021
- President: Donald Trump
- Preceded by: Richard Burkhauser
- Succeeded by: Heather Boushey

Personal details
- Born: Tyler Beck Goodspeed; 1984 or 1985 (age 41–42) Exeter, New Hampshire, U.S.
- Party: Republican
- Spouse: Oliver McPherson-Smith
- Education: Harvard University (BA, MA, PhD); University of Cambridge (MPhil, PhD)

Tyler Beck Goodspeed (born 1984/1985) is an American economist and economic historian who was the acting chairman of the Council of Economic Advisers from June 2020 to January 2021.

== Early life and education ==
Goodspeed was born in Exeter, New Hampshire, and graduated from Phillips Exeter Academy in 2003. He received his BA in economics and history, summa cum laude, from Harvard University in 2008, an MPhil in economic and social history from Emmanuel College, Cambridge, on a Gates Cambridge Scholarship in 2009, and returned to Harvard for his MA in 2011 and PhD in history, specializing in economic history, in 2014. His dissertation, Upon Daedalian Wings of Paper Money: Adam Smith, Free Banking, and the Financial Crisis of 1772, was supervised by a committee with Niall Ferguson, Benjamin M. Friedman, Richard Hornbeck, and Emma Georgina Rothschild. He also received a PhD in economics from Cambridge University.

== Career ==
He was a junior research fellow (postdoc) in economics at St. John’s College at Oxford University from 2014 to 2017 and a lecturer in economics in the Department of Political Economy at King's College London from 2016 to 2017.

In 2012, he published Rethinking the Keynesian Revolution: Keynes, Hayek, and the Wicksell Connection. His 2016 book, Legislating Instability: Adam Smith, Free Banking, and the Financial Crisis of 1772, analyses the collapse of the Ayr Bank in the Crisis of 1772. His 2017 book, Famine and Finance: Credit and the Great Famine of Ireland, analyzes the role of credit markets in mitigating the impact of adverse environmental shocks.

In 2026 he published Recession: The Real Reasons Economies Shrink and What to Do About It, an economic history of four centuries of recessions in the United States and United Kingdom.

He joined the Council of Economic Advisers in 2017 as senior economist and then chief economist for macroeconomic policy. He became a member in 2019. Goodspeed was appointed acting Chair on June 23, 2020. Goodspeed also chaired the Economic Policy Committee at the Organisation for Economic Co-operation and Development (OECD).

In March 2021 he became the Kleinheinz Fellow at the Hoover Institution at Stanford University. In 2023 he became the Chief Economist of ExxonMobil Corporation.

== Personal life ==
Goodspeed is married to fellow academic Oliver McPherson-Smith.

== Books ==
- Tyler Beck Goodspeed (2012). Rethinking the Keynesian Revolution: Keynes, Hayek, and the Wicksell Connection. Oxford University Press. ISBN 978-0-19-994279-4.
- Tyler Beck Goodspeed (2016). Legislating Instability: Adam Smith, Free Banking, and the Financial Crisis of 1722. Harvard University Press. ISBN 978-0-674-08888-7.
- Tyler Beck Goodspeed (2017). Famine and Finance: Credit and the Great Famine of Ireland. Springer. ISBN 978-3-319-31765-6.
- Tyler Goodspeed (2026). Recession: The Real Reasons Economies Shrink and What to Do About It. John Murray Press. ISBN 978-1-39-983227-4.

Political offices
| Preceded by Tomas J. Philipson; Acting | Chair of the Council of Economic Advisers; Acting; 2020–2021 | Succeeded by Cecilia Rouse |
