= Neil H. Jacoby =

American academic (1909–1979)

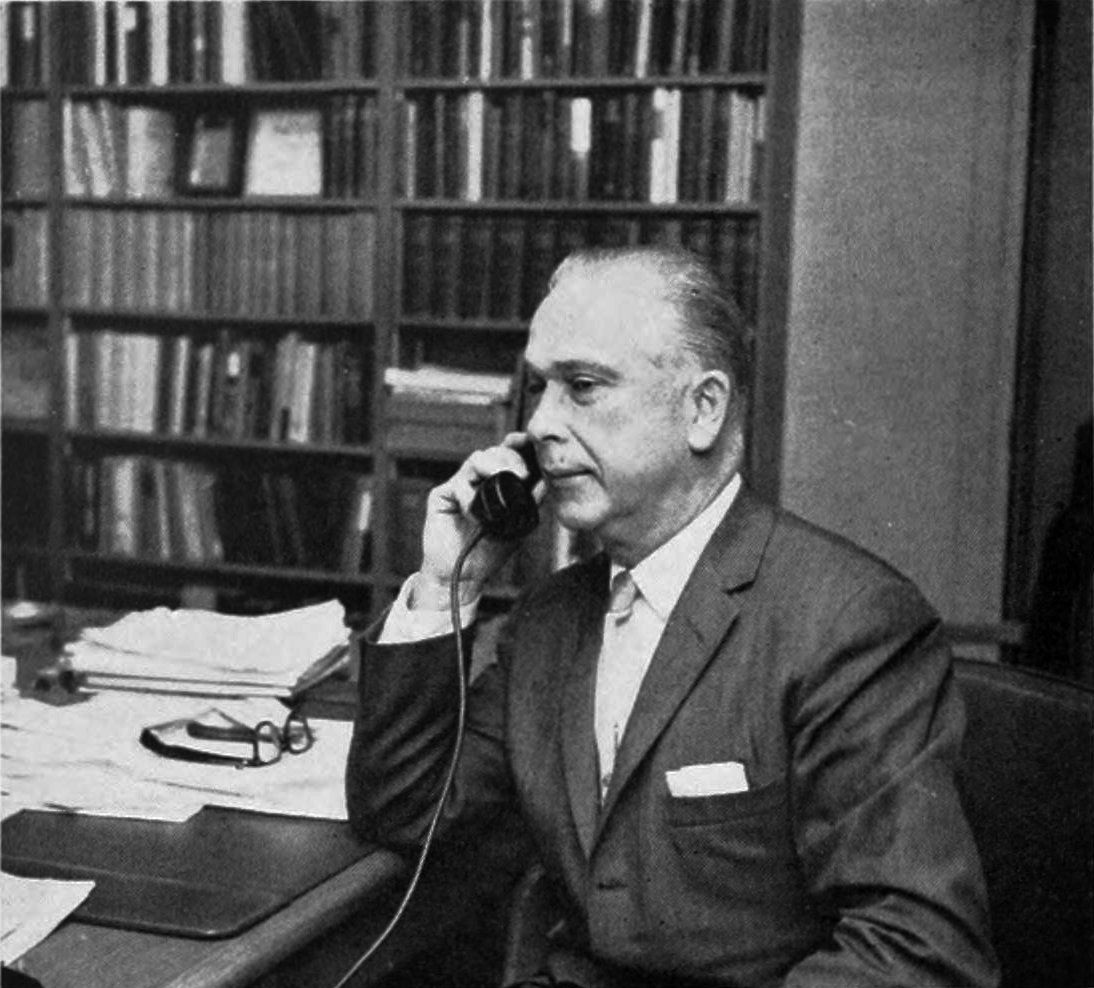
Neil Jacoby at UCLA (1960)

Neil Herman Jacoby (September 19, 1909 – May 31, 1979) was a university professor and public servant and was widely recognized as an expert on matters of taxation, finance, economic policy, and business-government relationships.

== Early life ==
He was born in Dundurn, Saskatchewan, Canada, and received his B.A. in 1930 from the University of Saskatchewan. He became a naturalized citizen of the United States in 1937 and received his Ph.D. from the University of Chicago in 1938.

== Career ==
Jacoby then served as a professor and administrator at the University of Chicago from 1938 to 1948. In 1940 he joined the research staff at the National Bureau for Economic Research, and in 1942 became a member of the Research Advisory Board of the Committee for Economic Development.

In 1948 he returned to academic life by becoming Dean of the University of California Graduate School of Business Administration. He worked as a consultant for the Rand Corporation from 1951 to 1961. During this time he also served as a member of President Dwight D. Eisenhower's Council of Economic Advisers (1953–1955), and as a U.S. Representative to the U.S. Economic and Social Council (1957).

== Bibliography ==
- Retail Sales Taxation; Relation to Business and Consumers, and Administrative Problems, Commerce Clearing House, Inc., New York (1938)
- Accounts Receivable Financing, (with Raymond J. Saulnier) National Bureau of Economic Research (1943)
- Financing Inventory on Field Warehouse Receipts, (with Raymond J. Saulnier), National Bureau of Economic Research, New York (1944), republished 2012 ISBN 978-1-25-829955-2
- Business Finance and Banking, (with Raymond J. Saulnier) National Bureau of Economic Research New York, (1947) republished 2007 ISBN 978-1-40-675647-0
- Can Prosperity Be Sustained? Henry Holt & Company (1956)
- U.S. Aid to Taiwan, A Study of Foreign Aid, Self-Help, and Development, Frederick A. Praeger New York (1966)
- European Economics—East and West: Convergence of Five European Countries and the United States, (with James E. Howell), World Publishing Company, Cleveland (1967)
- The Polluters: Industry or Government? (with F.G. Pennance), Institute of Economic Affairs (1972) ISBN 978-0-25-536028-9
- Corporate Power and Social Responsibility: A Blueprint for the Future, MacMillan Publishing Company, New York (1973) ISBN 978-0-02-915940-8
- Multinational Oil: A Study in Industrial Dynamics (Studies in the Modern Corporation), Macmillan Publishers Limited (1974) ISBN 978-0-02-915990-3
- Bribery and Extortion in World Business, (with Peter Nehemkis and Richard Eells), MacMillan Publishing Company, New York (1977) ISBN 978-0-02-916000-8
- Bank Deposits and Legal Reserve Requirements, (with Frank E. Norton) Literary Licensing, LLC, United States (2013) ISBN 978-1-25-869286-5
