= Carl A. Rouse =

American physicist (1926–2014)

Carl Rouse
- Born: July 14, 1926; Hazelton, Ohio, U.S.
- Died: February 25, 2014 (aged 87); Princeton, New Jersey, U.S.
- Education: Case Western Reserve University (BS); California Institute of Technology (MS, PhD)
- Scientific career
- Fields: Physics
- Institutions: Lawrence Livermore National Laboratory
- Thesis: Proportional-Counter Selection of Cloud-Chamber Events (1956)
- Doctoral advisor: Eugene Cowen

Carl A. Rouse (July 14, 1926 – February 25, 2014) was an American physicist, working in the fields of atomic, plasma, and computational physics. Rouse was the first African American to earn a Ph.D. in physics from Caltech.

== Early life and education ==
Rouse was born in Hazelton, Ohio. Interested in physics and boxing from an early age, Rouse was described as "gifted high school student" and won a Golden Glove in high school. He entered the Army Special Training Reserves in 1944 during World War II, where his academic performance sent him to New York University to participate in the ASTR Civil Engineering Course. Rouse would later realize that the program trained engineers for the Manhattan Project, which developed the Atomic bomb.

After leaving the army, Rouse completed a dual degree in physics and math at the Case Institute of Technology. He then attended the California Institute of Technology for his Ph.D., where he was advised by Eugene W. Cowen and conducted research with Carl David Anderson. When he graduated in 1956, he was the first African-American to earn his PhD in physics from Caltech.

== Career ==
After completing his Ph.D., Rouse took a position at the Lawrence Livermore Radiation Laboratory, now known as the Lawrence Livermore National Laboratory. He worked on modelling changes to solid matter when exposed to high temperatures and radiation. It was also at LLNL that he began work on his "High-Z" model of the sun, a project he work on through his career. Rouse would later work at the Naval Research Laboratory and General Atomics as well.

== Personal life ==
Rouse married school psychologist Lorraine Moxley in 1955. Their children, in order of birth, are physicist Forest Rouse, economist Cecilia Rouse, and anthropologist Carolyn Rouse.

Rouse died at his home in Princeton, New Jersey, on February 14, 2014, survived by his wife, three children, and six grandchildren.

After his death, the National Society of Black Physicists and Caltech created a research fellowship in his honor.
