= John L. Jackson Jr. =

American anthropologist, filmmaker and academic

John Jackson
- Born: 1971 (age 54–55)
- Education: Howard University (BA); Columbia University (MA, MPhil, PhD)
- Spouse: Deborah A. Thomas
- Children: 2
- Scientific career
- Fields: American studies Black studies Ethnic studies
- Thesis: Doing Harlem: Practicing Race and Class in Post Civil Rights Black America (2000)

John Lester Jackson Jr. (born 1971) is an American anthropologist, filmmaker, author, and university administrator. He is currently the Provost and the Richard Perry University Professor at the University of Pennsylvania and was previously Dean of the School of Social Policy & Practice and Special Adviser to the Provost on Diversity at Penn. He served as a junior fellow at the Harvard University Society of Fellows before joining the Cultural Anthropology faculty at Duke University.

== Early life and education ==
Jackson was born in 1971. He hosted a comic radio show called "The Jackson Attraction" during his junior and senior years of high school in Brooklyn, New York. In 1993, he graduated summa cum laude from Howard University with a BA in communications. While attending Howard, Jackson was supported by the University Merit Scholarship (1989-1993) and the Ronald E. McNair Scholarship (1992-1993). He received a National Science Foundation predoctoral fellowship to pursue graduate work at Columbia University, earning an MA (1994), an MPhil (1998), and a PhD. (2000) with distinction in anthropology. His dissertation was supported by the Ford Foundation Dissertation Fellowship.

== Career ==
After getting his doctorate, Jackson spent two years as a Junior Fellow at the Harvard University Society of Fellows in Cambridge, Massachusetts. From 2002 to 2006, he taught cultural anthropology as an assistant professor at Duke University in Durham, North Carolina. In 2006, he became the first Penn Integrates Knowledge (PIK) University Professor at the University of Pennsylvania. Jackson served as the Richard Perry University Professor of Communication and Anthropology and Professor of Africana Studies. In 2014, he was named Dean of the University of Pennsylvania School of Social Policy and Practice, and in 2019, Dean of the Annenberg School for Communication at the University of Pennsylvania. Since 2023, he has served as Provost of the University of Pennsylvania.

Jackson is a founding member of CAMRA and PIVPE, two Penn-based groups dedicated to the creation of visual and performance research initiatives and the development of rigorous evaluation criteria.

== Research ==
=== Real Black ===
In Real Black, Jackson proposed a new model for thinking about "authentic" black culture issues: racial sincerity. Jackson asserts that the caricatures of identity that racial authenticity imposes on people lock them into stereotypes. Sincerity, he argues, treats authenticity as an analytical model that seeks to deny people's freedom of choice in the search for identities. The book is based on more than a decade of ethnographic studies around New York City, including stories from police officers, conspiracy theorists, and gospel choir singers. Jackson's invented alter ego, Anthroman, finds ethnographic significance in everyday buildings, showing how race is defined, debated, imposed, and confounded every day.

=== Racial Paranoia ===
In this book, Jackson distinguishes racial paranoia (fear and suspicion of the hidden form of racism) from racism (observable acts of racism and prejudice). He argues that racism actually becomes more pronounced as explicit social discrimination subsides, using examples from current events and everyday interactions to show its serious impact on racially paranoid culture and the lives of all Americans. He explains how racism is cultivated, communicated, and strengthened—and how it complicates the goal of racial equality in the United States.

=== Thin Description ===
Thin Description: Ethnography and the African Hebrew Israelites of Jerusalem is based on the group of African Americans from varying backgrounds who sold their belongings and left the United States to relocate to Liberia in 1966. It recounts the group’s journey from their relocation and eventual move to the modern state of Israel, where the community has lived since 1969. Through this, Jackson attempts to understand how African Hebrew Israelites of Jerusalem navigate questions about the links between race and spirituality. Additionally, he explores challenges in anthropology research, especially as it pertains to conducting research on groups already searching for themselves and their identities.

== Personal life ==
Jackson is married to Deborah A. Thomas, the R. Jean Brownlee Professor of Anthropology in the Department of Anthropology at the University of Pennsylvania. They have two children and reside in South Philadelphia.

== Awards ==
- 2012: SAS Teaching Award for Innovative Teaching for the way his courses explored the intersection of theory and practical components
- 2008-2010: University of Pennsylvania Faculty Fellow, Penn Fellow (Inaugural Cohort)
- 2009: President's Award, American Anthropological Association
- 2002: American Educational Studies Association, Critics' Choice Award
- 2002: Honorable Mention, John Hope Franklin Prize, American Studies Association
- 2001: Publishers Weekly, Notable Non-Fiction Book

== Works ==
=== Books ===
- Harlemworld: Doing Race and Class in Contemporary Black America (University of Chicago Press, 2001)
- Real Black: Adventures in Racial Sincerity (University of Chicago Press, 2005)
- Racial Paranoia: The Unintended Consequences of Political Correctness (Basic Civitas, 2008)
- Thin Description: Ethnography and the African Hebrew Israelites of Jerusalem (Harvard University Press, 2013)
- Impolite Conversations: On Race, Politics, Sex, Money, and Religion with Cora Daniels (Atria at Simon & Schuster, 2014)
- Televised Redemption: Black Religious Media and Racial Empowerment with Carolyn Rouse and Marla Frederick (NYU Press, 2016)

=== Films ===
- Bad Friday: Rastafari after Coral Gardens (Third World Newsreel, 2012), co-directed with Deborah A. Thomas
- Making Sweet Tea: The Lives and Loves of Southern Black Gay Men, co-directed with Nora Gross and co-executive produced with E. Patrick Johnson
