= Kim Ruhl =

American economist, academic, and government official

Kim J. Ruhl
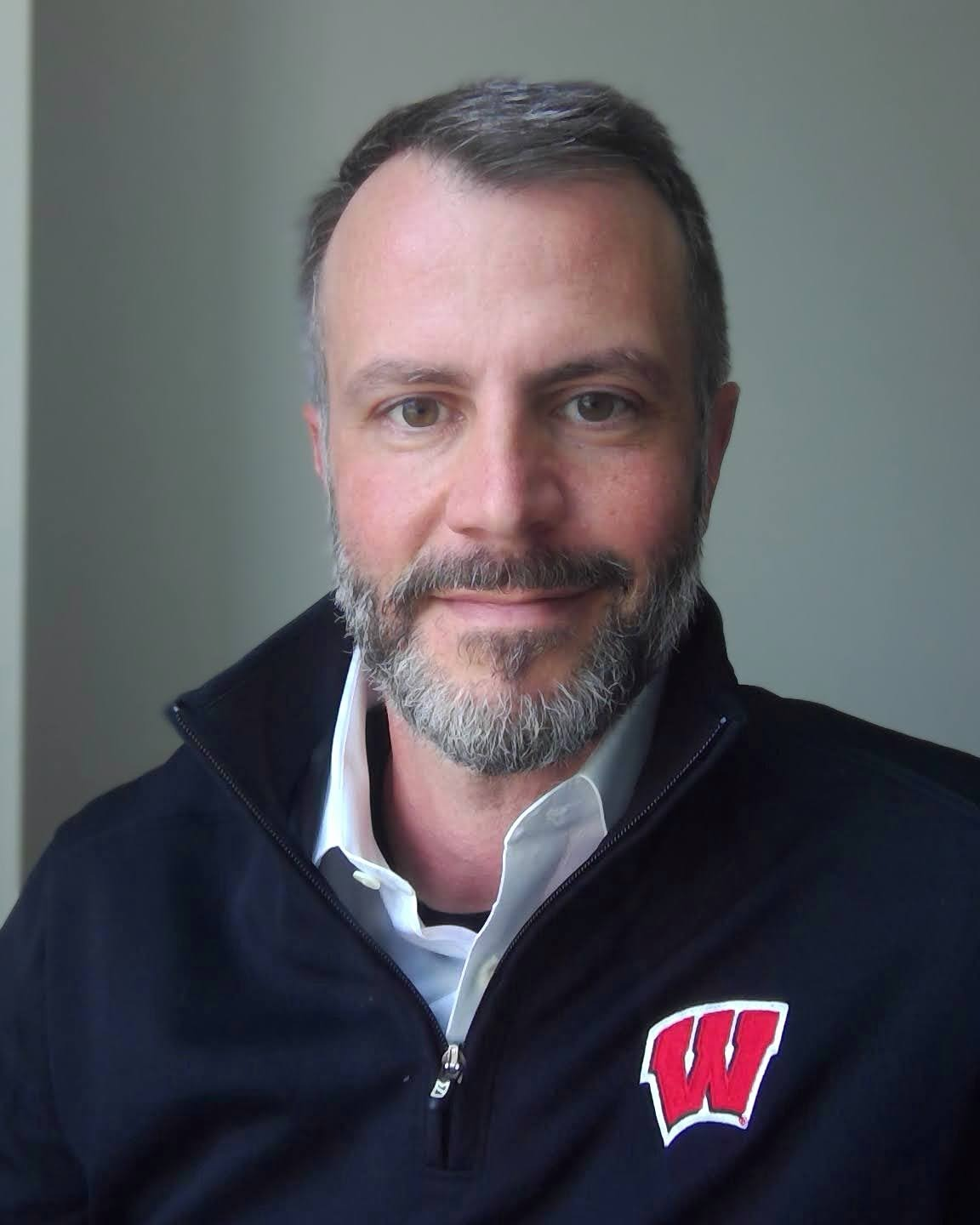

Member of the Council of Economic Advisors
- In office February 4, 2025 – February 27, 2026
- President: Donald Trump
- Preceded by: Kirabo Jackson
- Succeeded by: Aaron Hedlund

Personal details
- Education: Bowling Green State University University of Minnesota
- Occupation: Professor, Chair of Economics Department

Kim J. Ruhl is an American economist, academic, and government official, known for his work in international economics. He served as a Member of the Council of Economic Advisers (CEA) in the Executive Office of the President of the United States in 2025-2026. He is the Curt and Sue Culver Chair of Economics at the University of Wisconsin–Madison, where he also co-directs the Center for Research on the Wisconsin Economy (CROWE). Ruhl was a Special Sworn Researcher at the U.S. Department of Commerce Bureau of Economic Analysis (BEA), and is a research associate at the National Bureau of Economic Research (NBER).

== Early life and education ==
Ruhl was raised in Madison, Wisconsin, where he attended Madison East High School. He earned a Bachelor of Science degree in economics in 1999 from Bowling Green State University, Ohio, and a Ph.D. in economics in 2004 from the University of Minnesota, under the supervision of economist Timothy J. Kehoe.

== Academic career ==
Prior to joining the Department of Economics at the University of Wisconsin-Madison as an Associate Professor in 2018, Ruhl held faculty positions at the University of Texas at Austin, the New York University Stern School of Business, and Penn State University.

He was appointed to the Mary Sue and Mike Shannon Chair in Economics in 2018, a position he held until 2022, when he was named the Curt and Sue Culver Chair of Economics.

Since 2022, Ruhl has also served as co-director at the Center for Research on the Wisconsin Economy (CROWE), where he oversees the center's data initiative. The initiative centralizes state-level data resources and produces analysis relevant to policymakers on the Wisconsin economy.

Ruhl has held various editorial roles, including co-editor of the Journal of International Economics, and associate editor at Economics Letters and the Review of Economic Dynamics.

Ruhl served as a Special Sworn Researcher at the U.S. Department of Commerce Bureau of Economic Analysis (BEA) and has received National Science Foundation research grants. He is a research associate at the National Bureau of Economic Research (NBER), where he is affiliated with the International Trade and Investment and International Finance and Macroeconomics programs.

== Research and contributions ==
Ruhl's research spans three distinct trajectories in international economics: multinational firms, firm dynamics and trade, and trade policy uncertainty.

=== Multinational firms ===
==== Multinational firms' offshore profit shifting and Aggregate Measurement ====
In a 2017 study with economists Fatih Guvenen, Raymond Mataloni, and Dylan Rassier, Ruhl examined how U.S. multinational corporations shift profits to low-tax jurisdictions, causing distortions in official U.S economic statistics, particularly in the measurement of GDP and productivity growth. The researchers utilized data from the Bureau of Economic Analysis on multinational enterprises between the years 1982 and 2016 to reattribute earnings on U.S. Direct Investment Abroad (USDIA). Using labor compensation and sales to unaffiliated parties as proxies for the true location of economic activity, they reattributed 38% of earnings on USDIA back to the United States, from low-tax countries such as Bermuda, Ireland, and the Netherlands. The study concluded that adjusting for profit shifting would raise U.S. aggregate productivity growth rates and measured GDP.

The study's findings contribute to ongoing economic debates about the role of measurement in understanding key trends in economic performance, including the productivity slowdown and the decline in the labor share.

==== Intrafirm Trade and Vertical Fragmentation in the U.S. Multinational Enterprises ====
In a 2016 study with economists Natalia Ramondo and Veronica Rappoport, Ruhl analyzed trade flows within U.S. multinational corporations using Bureau of Economic Analysis data from 2004. The research found that the transactions between a parent company and its foreign affiliates, otherwise known as intrafirm trade, are relatively rare compared to what previous literature has shown. It also showed that it is highly concentrated among a small number of large affiliates, with the median manufacturing affiliate shipping nothing to or from its parent company and the largest 5% of affiliates, accounting for approximately half of all trade between parents and affiliates.

The study also questioned the validity of input–output linkages, a commonly used measure for vertical fragmentation, as a reliable tool for explaining intrafirm trade within multinational enterprises. Despite its common usage in the literature, the authors found that there was no significant relationship between the flow of goods between parents and affiliates and the input-output links between them. They concluded that multinational firm boundaries may be shaped more by the transfer of intangible assets such as knowledge and capabilities than by the shipment of physical goods.

=== Firm dynamics and trade ===
Ruhl's body of work on firm-level behavior in international trade foregrounds how dynamic adjustment, uncertainty, and firm heterogeneity influence import patterns and aggregate trade outcomes. In a 2014 working paper (published in 2021), co-authored with economists George Alessandria and Horag Choi, Ruhl developed a dynamic general equilibrium model that incorporated time and risk into the fixed-variable cost tradeoff. The model demonstrated that aggregate trade dynamics result from producer-level decisions to invest gradually and with uncertainty to reduce their future variable export costs. It further showed that tariff reforms generate time-varying trade elasticities. Their findings suggest that the benefits of lowering tariffs mostly come from firms focusing on increasing how much they export, rather than creating new exporting firms.

This dynamic approach contrasts with the static models that do not take into account change over time, and have traditionally dominated the international trade literature.

Building on this trajectory, for a 2017 study with economist Jonathon Willis, titled "New Exporter Dynamics," Ruhl used detailed data from Colombian manufacturing plants to study new exporters' behavior over time. They found that new exporters initially exported small amounts, grew gradually, and were most likely to exit the export market in their first few years, with only 63% surviving to export the following year. Their findings denote that survival dynamics are more complex than traditional sunk cost models suggest, as standard sunk-cost models assume immediate large-scale exporting upon entry, thus failing to capture these patterns of slow growth and early exit.

To address this, Ruhl and Willis introduced a model that incorporates gradual investment and uncertainty in exporting decisions to account for the high turnover and slow growth patterns observed in data. They found that the entry costs needed to match the data were three times smaller than those in the standard sunk-cost model, highlighting customer base accumulation and learning. The researchers concluded that dynamic models with richer plant-level heterogeneity are needed to accurately represent exporter behavior.

Surveying the literature on firm dynamics and trade, in a 2021 paper co-authored with economists George Alessandria and Costas Arkolakis, Ruhl contended that dynamic models produce substantially different welfare predictions than static models when past export participation is taken into consideration for current export status prediction. The study showed that static models fail to approximate the short-run or long-run outcomes of dynamic adjustment processes.

The survey has identified current unresolved questions in trade policy, including how uncertainty, temporary policies, and pre-announced future policies influence firm decisions and aggregate outcomes. The authors called for research integrating firm-level dynamic decisions across multiple destinations with geographic trade cost models.

=== Trade policy uncertainty ===
Ruhl's research on trade policy uncertainty examines how temporary trade policies and uncertainty about their duration affect firm behavior and aggregate trade outcomes.

In a 2011 study, he developed a dynamic model analyzing producer responses to Canada's 2003 bovine spongiform encephalopathy (BSE) case, which triggered a worldwide ban on Canadian beef imports of uncertain duration. The model incorporated "time to build" constraints in cattle production and showed that producers' expectations about the policy duration significantly influenced immediate production and investment decisions. Calibrated to observed data, the model replicated the sharp decline in slaughter rates and investment in new calves during the ban period, demonstrating that longer expected policy durations produced stronger immediate impacts on production decisions.

In a related strand of research, Ruhl co-authored a 2025 study with George Alessandria, Shafaat Yar Khan, Armen Khederlarian and Joseph Steinberg, which examined the evolution of trade policy uncertainty through the lens of US-China relations, over the course of six decades, between 1950 and 2008. The research documented how shifting tariff regimes, from embargo to normalization and China's accession to the World Trade Organization, affected trade flows dynamically rather than through immediate responses to tariff changes alone. Ruhl and co-authors developed a framework to separate the effects of past trade policy reform from expectations about future policy changes. They contended that the 1980 decision to grant China most-favored nation (MFN) tariff rates lowered U.S. trade barriers, but that Chinese exports did not surge immediately because firms feared the policy could be reversed during annual congressional reviews. This persistent uncertainty discouraged Chinese producers from making the large, upfront investments required to enter and scale in the U.S. market, causing export growth to unfold slowly over several decades rather than all at once. Using historical data and a dynamic model of exporter behavior, the study finds that resolving this long-standing uncertainty was a major driver of the eventual expansion in Chinese exports during the 1990s and 2000s.

== Government service ==
On February 4, 2025, Ruhl was appointed as a member of President Donald Trump's Council of Economic Advisors (CEA). His selection marked a milestone for the University of Wisconsin-Madison as the first sitting economist to serve as a member of the council. Ruhl's leave of absence at the University ended in February 2026. He left the council on February 27, 2026 and returned to UW-Madison. He was succeeded by Aaron Hedlund.
