= Pierre Yared =

Lebanese-American economist

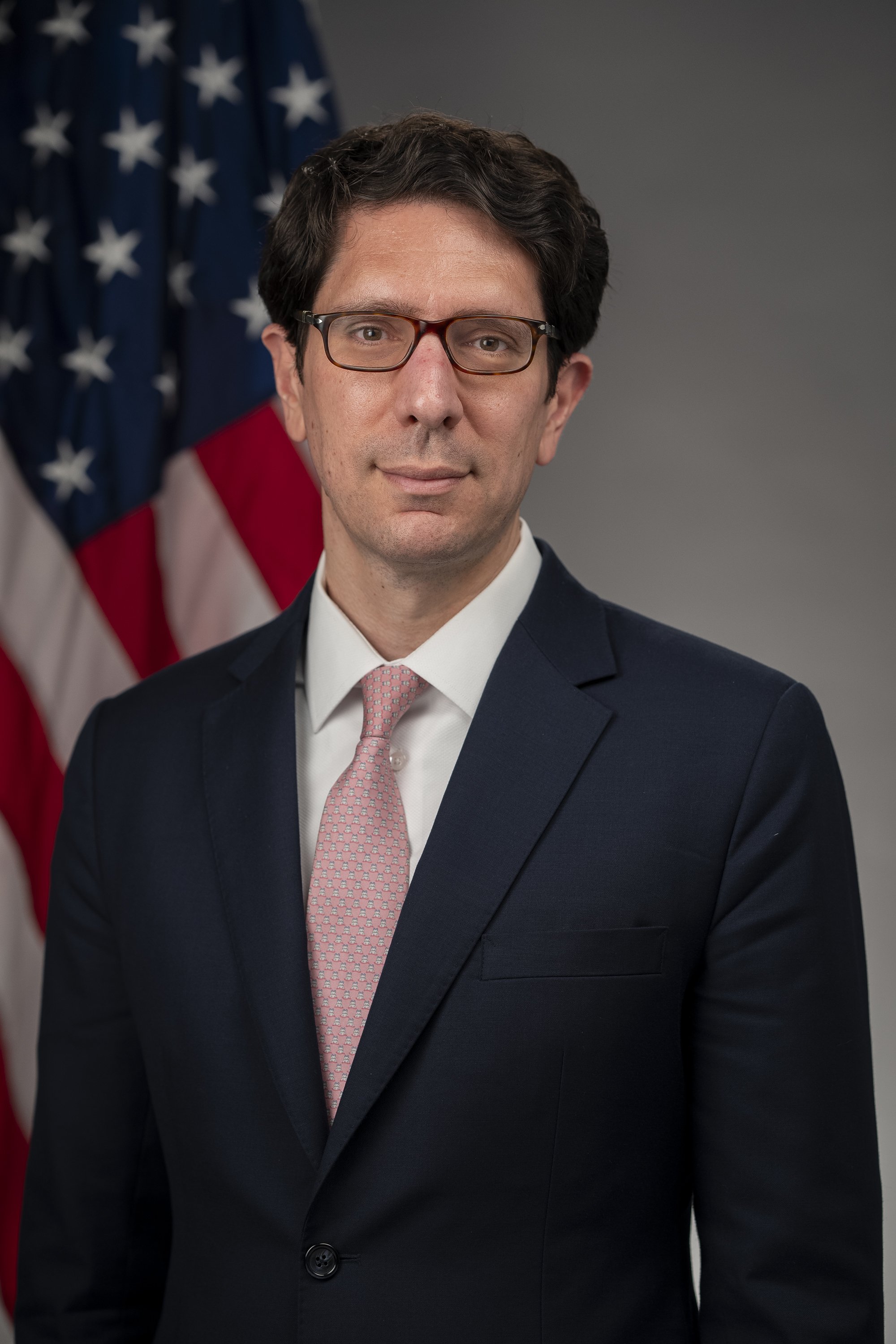
- Official portrait, 2025

Chair of the Council of Economic Advisers
- Acting
- In office September 16, 2025 – July 6, 2026
- President: Donald Trump
- Preceded by: Stephen Miran
- Succeeded by: Christopher Phelan

Vice Chair of the Council of Economic Advisers
- In office February 4, 2025 – July 6, 2026
- President: Donald Trump
- Preceded by: Heather Boushey
- Succeeded by: Christopher Phelan

Personal details
- Born: Beirut, Lebanon
- Party: Republican
- Spouse: Lucy Phillips
- Relatives: Dave Phillips (father-in-law)
- Education: Harvard University (BA); Massachusetts Institute of Technology (MA, PhD)

Pierre Yared is a Lebanese-American economist, academic, and U.S. government official, known for his work on macroeconomic policy and political economy. He served as the acting chairman of the Council of Economic Advisers (CEA) in the Executive Office of the President of the United States from September 2025 to July 2026. He was a member and vice chair from February 2025 until his appointment as acting chair. He holds the title of Mitsubishi UFJ Trust and Banking (MUTB) Professor of International Business at Columbia Business School. Throughout his tenure at Columbia, he served in several senior administrative roles, including senior vice dean for faculty affairs and vice dean for executive education.

Yared is a research associate at the National Bureau of Economic Research, and a member of the Council on Foreign Relations and the Economic Club of New York.

== Early life and education ==
Yared was born in Beirut in 1979 during the Lebanese Civil War and was raised in Cleveland, Ohio, where he attended University School. His father, Jean-Pierre Yared, is the director of the Center for Critical Care Medicine in the Heart and Vascular Institute and a staff anesthesiologist in the Anesthesiology Institute at the Cleveland Clinic. His mother, Sana Yared, is a French teacher and docent at the Cleveland Museum of Art.

Yared earned a Bachelor of Arts in economics from Harvard University in 2001 and a Ph.D. in economics from the Massachusetts Institute of Technology (MIT) in 2007.

== Personal life ==
Yared married visual artist Lucy Phillips in 2016. Phillips is the daughter of Stanley Davis Phillips, former U.S. ambassador to Estonia.

== Academic career ==
Yared joined the faculty of Columbia Business School in 2007 as an assistant professor.

In 2015, he became co-director of the Richman Center for Business, Law, and Public Policy, a position which he continues to hold. He was named the Mitsubishi UFJ Trust and Banking (MUTB) Professor of International Business in 2019.

Yared has also held senior administrative roles at the school, including vice dean for executive education and senior vice dean for faculty affairs.

He is the co-author of Intermediate Macroeconomics (2021) with Nicolas Vincent, external deputy governor of the Bank of Canada and professor of economics in the Department of Applied Economics at HEC Montréal.

Yared has held editorial positions at several peer-reviewed journals. He worked as an associate editor of the American Economic Review (2018–2024), Journal of Monetary Economics (2018–2020), International Economic Review (2013–2018), and Journal of the European Economic Association (2010–2016), and as a foreign editor of the Review of Economic Studies (2014–2020).

== Research focus ==
Yared's research spans three main trajectories in macroeconomics: government debt and fiscal policy, the international role of the U.S. dollar and military power, and central banking and inflation. His academic work is closely aligned with his public commentary and policy engagement, particularly on the subject of U.S. fiscal sustainability.

=== Government debt and fiscal policy ===
Yared has written extensively on the political economy of fiscal policy. In his 2019 article “Rising Government Debt: Causes and Solutions for a Decades-Old Trend,” he examined the growth of public debt in advanced economies since the 1980s, arguing that it stems from rising government spending. In the United States, he identified the expansion of entitlement programs, such as Medicare and Social Security, as the primary driver of debt growth, rather than tax cuts, and he noted similar patterns in other advanced economies. Yared argued that normative macroeconomic theories cannot explain these patterns. He linked these patterns to demographic and political forces, resulting in rising political polarization and electoral uncertainty, which makes spending restraint more difficult.

Yared has also argued that mounting debt inhibits the United States’ ability to respond to global crises, potentially undermining the dollar's reserve currency status and posing significant long-term risks to global leadership. He has advocated for gradual reforms that simultaneously incorporate entitlement restructuring and broadening the tax base, citing Sweden's fiscal adjustment in the 1990s as an example.

He has written about the solutions to these mounting debt problems in a series of papers that he co-authored with Yale professor and economist Marina Halac. These articles examine how fiscal rules function under political and informational constraints. Their 2014 study modeled how economic shocks erode governments' adherence to fiscal rules, while later work examined optimal fiscal rules with threshold-based penalties under limited enforcement. Their research emphasizes the time-inconsistency in government policymaking and the need for fiscal rules that restrict policymakers, analyzing the tradeoff between commitment to not overspend and flexibility to react to shocks.

Yared's positions contrasts with other economists, including Olivier Blanchard, Jason Furman, and Lawrence Summers, who suggested that concerns about debt growth were overblown in the pre-pandemic low-interest rate environment.

=== Dollar and military dominance ===
In a 2024 article, Yared presented a game-theoretic framework that he has developed with University of Chicago professor Carolin Pflueger, which shows that military power and the financial privilege of a dominant currency reinforce one another. The model demonstrates that militarily dominant countries benefit from a funding advantage in the form of lower government bond yields, which helps those hegemonic countries to sustain their power advantage and win wars. In the case of the United States, its military strength reassures investors about asset safety, supporting the dollar's reserve currency status and enabling lower borrowing costs. In turn, the U.S. financial dominance allows for a more efficient defense financing. The authors argued that this dynamic contributes to the U.S.'s exorbitant privilege in the global market. However, they also warned of the system's fragility, noting that rising debt, fiscal gridlock, or alternative reserve currencies could weaken the U.S. position.

Yared connected this analysis to broader fiscal policy concerns, arguing that debt sustainability affects national security. He has warned that persistent deficits could constrain the government's ability to respond to global threats and has advocated for fiscal reforms to preserve economic and strategic leadership.

=== Inflation and central banking ===
In a 2024 Brookings study co-authored with Hassan Afrouzi, Marina Halac, and Kenneth Rogoff, Yared examined how evolving economic and political conditions increase the difficulty of sustaining low and stable inflation. The authors argued that the disinflationary environment of the late 20th and early 21st centuries was supported by structural forces associated with the Washington Consensus, such as globalization, market liberalization, de-unionization, and fiscal restraint, combined with reforms that enhanced central bank independence and inflation targeting. These factors contributed to low inflation levels by the mid-2010s, just before inflation spiked in the wake of the COVID-19 pandemic. The authors are of the view that the political economy environment in which central banks operate has changed markedly after the pandemic.

As structural trends reverse toward de-globalization, industrial policy, and higher defense budgets, the study contends that central banks face renewed political pressure from elected officials to prioritize employment and fiscal expansion over price stability. The authors used a dynamic New Keynesian model to analyze these mechanisms, incorporating political economy frictions. The model demonstrates how inflationary biases can re-emerge even when central banks maintain formal independence.

The paper challenges a prevailing view among economists that inflation will eventually return and stay at lower central bank targets — around 2 percent in advanced economies, somewhat higher in emerging ones. It also warns that political constraints may lead to greater inflation volatility in the coming years.

== Government service ==
In February 2025, Yared was appointed member and vice chairman of the Council of Economic Advisers in the Executive Office of the President of the United States. He served as acting chairman from September 2025 until July 2026, following the leave of absence of Chairman Stephen Miran, who was appointed at the Federal Reserve’s Board of Governors to succeed Adriana Kugler. Yared was also considered to succeed Gita Gopinath as First Deputy Managing Director of the International Monetary Fund.

On June 30, 2026, President Donald Trump announced that Yared was stepping down to return to his teaching post at Columbia Business School and thanked him for his service, referring to him as a "STAR" and a leader of his "team of 'brainiacs.'" Yared was succeeded by the president's nominee and University of Minnesota economics professor, Christopher Phelan.

At his exit interview with Bloomberg, Yared argued that rapid economic policymaking is needed to rejuvenate the U.S. economy and allow it to "lead by example," pointing to the administration's deregulatory push in business, investment in artificial intelligence, and focus on domestic supply chains.

Yared is described as committed to fiscal restraint and central bank independence, while also supporting U.S. military spending to promote U.S. geopolitical hegemony and financial dominance.

Political offices
Preceded by Stephen Miran	Chair of the Council of Economic Advisers; Acting; 2025–2026	Succeeded by Christopher Phelan
