= David N. Hempton =

Northern Irish historian and academic

David N. Hempton FRHistS
- Born: David Neil Hempton; February 19, 1952 (age 74); Northern Ireland
- Title: Harvard University Distinguished Service Professor and Alonzo L. McDonald Family Professor of Evangelical Theological Studies, Harvard Divinity School

Academic background
- Education: Queen's University Belfast; University of St Andrews

Academic work
- Discipline: History
- Sub-discipline: History of Christianity
- Institutions: Queen's University Belfast; Boston University; Harvard University
- Main interests: Evangelicalism

David Neil Hempton FRHistS (born 1952) is a Northern Irish historian of evangelicalism, Harvard University Distinguished Service Professor and Alonzo L. McDonald Family Professor of Evangelical Theological Studies at Harvard Divinity School, and fellow of the Royal Historical Society.

== Biography ==
Hempton was born on 19 February 1952, in Northern Ireland. He earned his Bachelor of Arts degree (1974) from the Queen's University Belfast and his Doctor of Philosophy degree (1977) from the University of St Andrews. Hempton began teaching at Queen's University in 1979, where he was professor of modern history and director of the school of history. He joined the faculty of Boston University in 1998, where he was professor of the history of Christianity, and in 2008 named "Outstanding Teacher of the Year" at the divinity school. In 2007, he was appointed as the first Alonzo L. McDonald Family Professor of Evangelical Theological Studies at Harvard Divinity School, and in 2012 it was announced he would succeed William A. Graham as dean of the school. In 2020 he was admitted as a member of the Royal Irish Academy. He retired as HDS dean at the end of the 2022-23 academic year, but remains on the faculty.

== Selected publications ==
- Methodism and Politics in British Society, 1750–1850, winner of The Whitfield Prize (1984) ISBN 041555571X
- The Religion of the People: Methodism and Popular Religion C. 1750–1900 (1996) ISBN 0415077141
- Religion and Political Culture in Britain and Ireland: From the Glorious Revolution to the Decline of Empire (1996) ISBN 0521479258
- Methodism: Empire of the Spirit, winner of the Jesse Lee Prize (2005) ISBN 0300119763
- Evangelical Disenchantment: Nine Portraits of Faith and Doubt (2008) ISBN 030014282X
- The Church in the Long Eighteenth Century, winner of the Albert C. Outler Prize (2011) ISBN 184511440X

Academic offices
Preceded by William A. Graham	Dean of Harvard Divinity School; 2012–2023	Succeeded by Marla F. Frederick
