= Marla F. Frederick =

American ethnographer, professor and scholar

Marla Faye Frederick is an American ethnographer and scholar, with a focus on the African American religious experience. Her work addresses a range of topics including race, gender, religion and media studies. She became the eighteenth Dean of Harvard Divinity School on January 1, 2024.

== Education ==
Frederick earned a BA in English from Spelman College and in 2000, earned a PhD in cultural anthropology from Duke University. She was a postdoctorate fellow at the Center for the Study of Religion at Princeton University.

== Career and service ==
Frederick was an assistant professor at the University of Cincinnati. She has been a visiting professor at the Interdenominational Theological Center in Atlanta and at Northwestern University.

In the early 2000s and 2010s, Frederick was Assistant Professor of Religion and African-American Studies at Harvard University. In 2008, she was the Joy Foundation Fellow at the Radcliffe Institute for Advanced Study at Harvard.

Frederick became the Asa Griggs Candler Professor of Religion and Culture at the Candler School of Theology at Emory University in 2019.

Frederick has served as the President of the Association of Black Anthropologists. Frederick was the president of the American Academy of Religion (AAR) in 2021.

On August 24, 2023, Harvard University announced that Frederick would become Dean of Harvard Divinity School on January 1, 2024.

== Research ==
Frederick's first book Between Sundays: Black Women and Everyday Struggles of Faith (University of California Press, 2003), an ethnography of black church women in Halifax County, North Carolina, was praised by reviewers; the review in Contemporary Sociology described it as a work that "puts a human face on so many sociological concepts and categories."

In 2007, Frederick participated in a seven-author collaborative project in which scholars embedded themselves in North Carolina communities and observed how American democracy functioned in an "ordinary" community beyond just the act of voting. The resulting book was Local Democracy Under Siege Activism, Public Interests, and Private Politics, which won the 2008 Society for the Anthropology of North America (SANA) Book Prize.

Her first book on the relationship between television and religion was Colored Television: American Religion Gone Global (Stanford University Press, 2015). In 2016, Frederick co-authored Televised Redemption: Black Religious Media and Racial Empowerment with Carolyn Moxey Rouse and John L. Jackson Jr.

Academic offices
Preceded by David N. Hempton	Dean of Harvard Divinity School; 2024-present
