= Paul Wonnacott =

- Born: March 16, 1933 (age 93); London, Ontario

Academic background
- Education: Princeton University; University of Western Ontario
- Influences: Doctoral Adviser, Jacob Viner

Academic work
- Discipline: International economics, macroeconomics
- Institutions: Middlebury College; Columbia University; University of Maryland at College Park

Gordon Paul Wonnacott (born March 16, 1933) was the coauthor of Free Trade Between The United States And Canada: The Potential Economic Effects (with R.J. Wonnacott), a study that helped to revive the Canadian debate over free trade and set the background for the Canada-United States Free Trade Agreement of 1988. This agreement was the major issue in the 1988 Canadian federal election, and came into effect after the Conservative victory in that election. Paul Wonnacott was also the author of two textbooks, and served as a member of the Council of Economic Advisers under President George H.W. Bush from 1991 until January 1993.

== Biography ==
He was born in London, Ontario, in 1933, son of Gordon Wonnacott and Muriel Johnston Wonnacott. He received his B.A. in Honors History from the University of Western Ontario in 1955, and his Ph.D. in economics from Princeton University in 1959.

He was on the economics faculty of Columbia University as an instructor and then assistant professor from 1958 to 1962. He was an associate professor and then professor at the University of Maryland (1962–92). From 1994 until 2000, he was the Alan Holmes Professor at Middlebury College.

He was a fellow at the Brookings Institution (1957–58), where he wrote his thesis on the Canadian experience with exchange-rate flexibility in the 1950s, which was later published as The Canadian Dollar.

He was on the research staff of the Canadian Royal Commission on Banking and Finance (1962). His major service for the U.S. Government was on the Council of Economic Advisers where he was a senior staff economist (1968–70), working primarily on international finance. The International Monetary Fund system of pegged-but-flexible exchange rates was under severe strain, and he studied the possibility of greater exchange rate flexibility. He returned to the council as a member, 1991–93. He also served briefly with the Federal Reserve, the State Department, and the U.S. Treasury.

== U.S.-Canadian Free Trade ==
When Free Trade Between The United States And Canada: The Potential Economic Effects appeared, it attracted considerable attention in the Canadian press, including major articles in the Financial Post, the Toronto Star, and the Globe and Mail. The Globe’s coverage—taking up most of a page (Sept. 25, 1967, p. 26)—included a report by Bruce MacDonald, who referred to the Wonnacott study as “A book that undertakes the broadest, most intensive economic study of the issue that has repeatedly divided Canada since it became a nation 100 years ago.” He noted that the past controversy “has usually been waged in political terms that bore little or no relation to economic facts.” The Wonnacott study is an “effort to fill this vacuum.”

This study contributed to major changes in Canadian attitudes toward free trade with the United States in the two decades prior to the negotiation of the free trade pact. These changes were reflected in a study by the Economic Council of Canada, Looking Outward (1975), which “built upon the work of economists such as the Wonnacott brothers, John Young, Ted English, Harry Johnson, and others who had long contended that the small Canadian Economy could not afford to isolate itself from the world economy by maintaining high barriers to imports.” At the same time, business executives were increasingly coming to the conclusion that the Canadian domestic market was too small to exploit economies of scale.

Gordon Ritchie, the Canadian Deputy Chief Negotiator for the free trade agreement, wrote of the Wonnacott study as "a seminal project on the issue" of U.S.-Canadian free trade. The Wonnacotts concluded that economies of scale would provide a major source of gain from free trade, particularly for the relatively small Canadian economy. A study for the Brookings Institution and Institute for Research on Public Policy (Ottawa) observed that, at the time the Wonnacott book was published, the “most glaring deficiency [of standard international economics was] the failure to incorporate economies of scale and imperfectly competitive markets, which, thanks to the work of several scholars—notably Harry C. Eastman and Styfan Stykolt, Ronald J. Wonnacott and Paul Wonnacott, and Richard G. Harris and David Cox—is now clearly understood to be the salient feature of secondary manufacturing in Canada.” Max Corden judged the Wonnacotts' book “an outstanding trade-liberalization study—probably one of the most impressive contributions to applied international economics in recent years.”

== Textbooks ==
During the 1960s and 1970s, widely accepted Keynesian theory was under vigorous attack from Milton Friedman and other monetarists. Intermediate textbooks at that time were heavily Keynesian, although a few were written from the monetarist (classical) viewpoint. Each side often presented the opposing view as a straw man, to ease its demolition.

In his intermediate macroeconomics text, which first appeared in 1974, Wonnacott pointed out the strengths and problems with each of these viewpoints, and he attempted to explain each in a manner that the proponents would recognize. With his brother, Ron, he wrote an introductory Economics text.

== Bibliography ==
- Ronald J. Wonnacott; Paul Wonnacott (1967). Free Trade Between the United States and Canada: The Potential Economic Effects. Harvard University. ISBN 978-0-674-31900-4.
- Paul Wonnacott; Ronald J. Wonnacott (1990). Economics. Wiley. ISBN 978-0-471-61627-6.
- Paul Wonnacott (1978). Macroeconomics. R. D. Irwin. ISBN 978-0-256-02032-8.
- Paul Wonnacott (1987). The United States and Canada: The Quest for Free Trade : an Examination of Selected Issues. Peterson Institute. ISBN 978-0-88132-056-5.
