= Canada–United States Free Trade Agreement =

Bilateral trade agreement (implemented 1989)

Free Trade Agreement between Canada and the United States of America Accord de libre-échange entre le Canada et les États-Unis d'Amérique (French)
- Languages: English; French
- Type: Free trade area
- Member states: Canada; United States

Establishment
  - Effective: January 1, 1989
  - NAFTA in force: January 1, 1994

The Canada–United States Free Trade Agreement (CUSFTA), official name as the Free Trade Agreement between Canada and the United States of America (French: Accord de libre-échange entre le Canada et les États-Unis d'Amérique), was a bilateral trade agreement reached by negotiators for Canada and the United States on October 4, 1987, and signed by the leaders of both countries on January 2, 1988. The agreement phased out a wide range of trade restrictions in stages, over a ten-year period, and resulted in a substantial increase in cross-border trade as an improvement to the last replaced trade deal. With the addition of Mexico in 1994, CUSFTA was superseded by the North American Free Trade Agreement (NAFTA) (French: Accord de libre-échange nord-américain (ALENA), Spanish: Tratado de Libre Comercio de América del Norte (TLCAN)).

As stated in the agreement, the main purposes of the Canada–United States Free Trade Agreement were:

- Eliminate barriers to trade in goods and services between Canada and the United States
- Facilitate conditions of fair competition within the free-trade area established by the Agreement
- Significantly liberalize conditions for investment within that free-trade area
- Establish effective procedures for the joint administration of the Agreement and the resolution of disputes
- Lay the foundation for further bilateral and multilateral cooperation to expand and enhance the benefits of the Agreement

== History ==
=== Background ===
Starting in 1855, while Canada was under British control, free trade was implemented between the colonies of British North America and the United States under the Reciprocity Treaty. In 1866, a year before Canadian Confederation, the United States Congress voted to cancel the treaty. Canada's first Prime Minister, John A. Macdonald, attempted and failed to reinstate reciprocity, after which the government of Canada moved to a more protectionist policy, the National Policy. Fears grew among many politicians that closer economic ties with the United States would lead to political annexation.

The Liberal Party of Canada had traditionally supported free trade. Free trade in natural products was a central issue in the 1911 Canadian federal election. The Conservative Party campaigned using anti-American rhetoric, and the Liberals lost the election. The issue of free trade did not rise to this level of national prominence in Canada again for many decades.

From 1935 to 1980, the two nations entered a number of bilateral trade agreements that greatly reduced tariffs in both nations. The most significant of these agreements was the 1960s Automotive Products Trade Agreement (also known as the Auto Pact).

After the signing of the Auto Pact, the Canadian Government considered proposing free-trade agreements in other sectors of the economy. However, the United States government was less receptive to this idea, and in fact, wanted to phase out some guarantees in the Pact. Canadian attention turned to the question of a broader free-trade agreement between the two countries.

During the next two decades, a number of academic economists studied the effects of a free trade agreement between the two countries. Several of them—Ronald Wonnacott and Paul Wonnacott, and Richard G. Harris and David Cox—concluded that Canadian real GDP would be significantly increased if both U.S. and Canadian tariffs and other trade barriers were removed and Canadian industry could consequently produce at larger, more efficient scale. Other economists on the free-trade side included John Whalley of the University of Western Ontario and Richard Lipsey of the C. D. Howe Institute.

Others were concerned that free trade would have negative effects, fearing capital flight and job insecurity because of international outsourcing, and also that closer economic ties with the "Giant to the South" might risk an erosion of Canadian sovereignty. Opponents included Mel Watkins of the University of Toronto and David Crane of the Toronto Star, one of Canada's leading newspapers.

A number of government studies drew increasing attention to the possibility of a bilateral free-trade negotiation: Looking Outward (1975), by the Economic Council of Canada; several reports of the Senate Standing Committee on Foreign Affairs (1975, 1978, and 1982); and the 1985 report of the Macdonald Commission (formally, the Royal Commission on the Economic Union and Development Prospects for Canada), chaired by former Liberal politician Donald Stovel Macdonald. Macdonald declared that "Canadians should be prepared to take a leap of faith" and pursue more open trade with the United States. Although Macdonald was a former Liberal Minister of Finance, the commission's findings were embraced by Prime Minister Brian Mulroney's Progressive Conservative Party, even though they were opposed to a free-trade initiative in the 1984 Canadian election campaign. The stage was set for the beginning of free-trade negotiations.

=== Negotiations ===
US President Ronald Reagan welcomed the Canadian initiative and the United States Congress gave the President the authority to sign a free trade agreement with Canada, subject to it being presented for Congressional review by October 5, 1987. In May 1986, Canadian and American negotiators began to work out a trade deal. The Canadian team was led by former deputy Minister of Finance Simon Reisman and the American side by Peter O. Murphy, the former deputy United States trade representative in Geneva.

The agreement between the two countries ultimately created substantially liberalized trade between them, removing most remaining tariffs, although tariffs were only a minor part of the FTA. Average tariffs on goods crossing the border were well below 1% by the 1980s. Instead, Canada desired unhindered access to the American economy. Americans, in turn, wished to have access to Canada's energy and cultural industries.

In the negotiations, Canada retained the right to protect its cultural industries and such sectors as education and health care. As well, some resources such as water were meant to be left out of the agreement. The Canadians did not succeed in winning free competition for American government procurement contracts. Canadian negotiators also insisted on the inclusion of a dispute resolution mechanism.

=== Debate and implementation ===
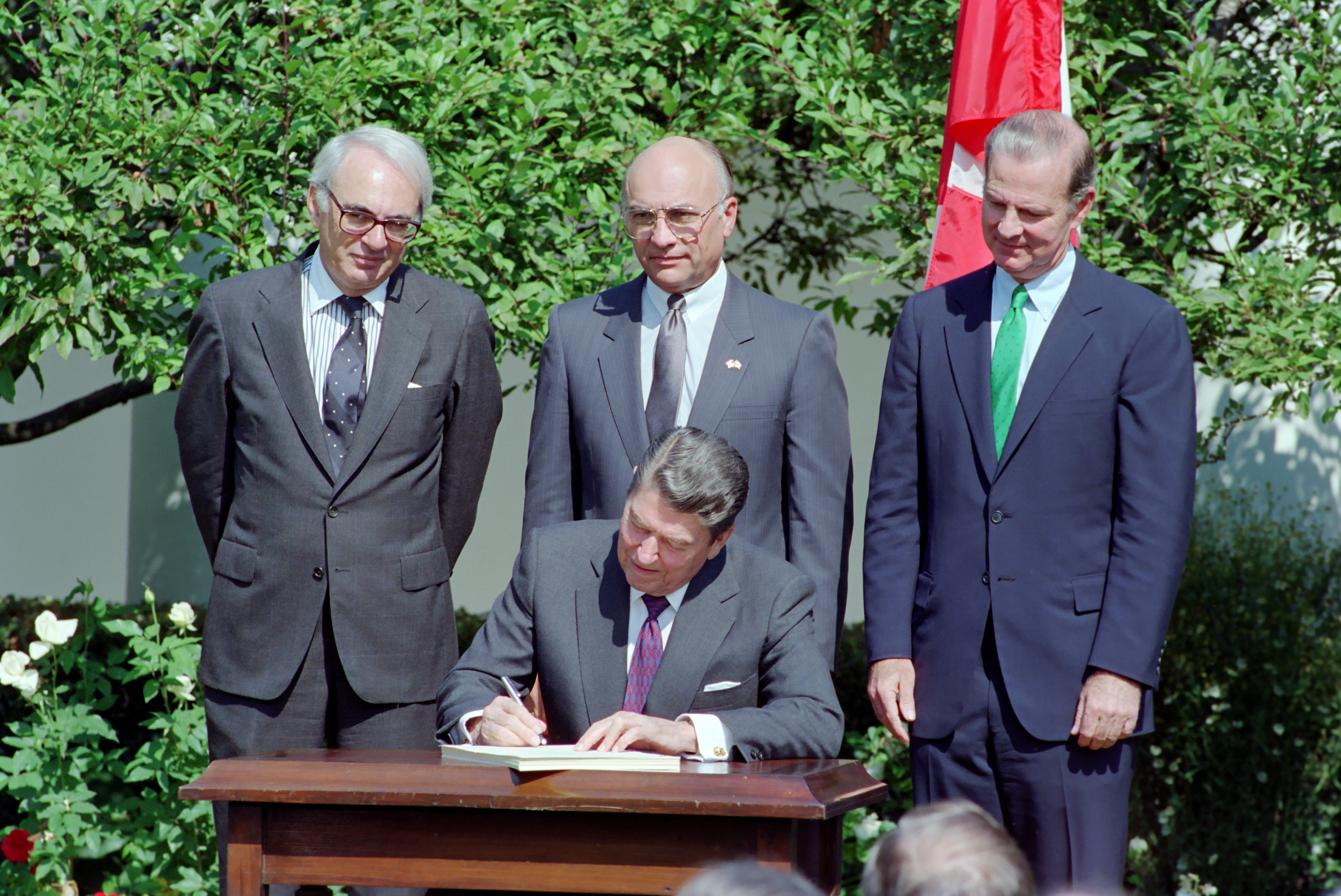
President Ronald Reagan in the Rose Garden signing the Canada United States Free Trade Agreement FTA with James Baker, Clayton Yeutter, and Allan Gotlieb looking on.

The debate in Canada over whether to implement the negotiated agreement was very contentious. The opposition Liberal Party vociferously opposed the agreement, with Liberal leader John Turner saying that he would "tear it up" if he became prime minister, and the New Democratic Party under leader Ed Broadbent also strongly opposed the agreement. Both parties contended that the agreement would erode Canadian sovereignty, arguing that Canada would effectively become the "51st state" of the US if the agreement was implemented. They also raised concerns about how Canada's social programs and other trade agreements such as the Auto Pact would be affected.

The legislation to implement the agreement was delayed in the Senate, which had a Liberal majority. Partly in response to these delays, Mulroney called an election in 1988. The Trade Agreement was by far the most prominent issue of the campaign, prompting some to call it the "Free Trade Election." It was the first Canadian election to feature large third-party campaign advertising, with supporters and opponents using lobbyists to buy television advertisements.

It was also the first Canadian election to use much negative advertising; one anti-free-trade advertisement showed negotiators "removing a line" from the Free Trade Agreement, which at the end of the advertisement was revealed to be the Canada–US border. Although some opinion polls showed slightly more Canadians against the Agreement than in favour of it, Mulroney's Progressive Conservatives benefited from being the only party in favour of the agreement, while the Liberals and NDP split the anti-free trade vote. In addition, future Quebec Premiers Jacques Parizeau and Bernard Landry backed the agreement which was seen as a factor for the PC party support in Quebec. Mulroney won a governing majority and the agreement was passed into law, even though a majority of the voters had voted for parties opposing free trade.

The Free Trade Agreement faced much less opposition in the US. Polls showed that up to 40% of Americans were unaware that the agreement had been signed. The Agreement implementation act was given to the Congress for "fast-track" approval by President Reagan on July 26, 1988, meaning that it could be accepted or rejected but could not be amended. The United States–Canada Free-Trade Agreement Implementation Act of 1988 was passed by the House of Representatives by a vote of 366 - 40 on August 9, 1988 and by the Senate by a vote of 83–9 on September 19, 1988. President Reagan signed the Act on September 28, 1988. It became Public Law No: 100–449.

== Effects ==
The exact ramifications of the agreement are hard to measure. Trade between Canada and the U.S., which had already been on the rise, increased at an accelerated rate after the agreement was signed. While throughout the 20th century, exports fairly consistently made up about 25% of Canada's gross domestic product (GDP), since 1990 exports have been about 40% of GDP. After 2000, they reached nearly 50%.

A 2016 paper estimates "that CUSFTA increased the yearly profits of Canadian manufacturing by 1.2%". A 2024 study found that Canadian workers adjusted smoothly to the effect of trade liberalization with the United States: workers in sectors that faced import competition with the US were likely to suffer modest negative economic outcomes in the short-run but they made up for this by switching to jobs in Canadian economic sectors that benefitted on easier access to the US market.

Often, analyses of the free trade agreement find that its effects on the two countries depend on the difference in value between the Canadian dollar and the US dollar. In 1990–1991, the Canadian dollar rose sharply in value against the US dollar, making Canadian manufactured goods much more expensive for Americans to buy and making American manufactured goods much cheaper for Canadians, who no longer had to pay high duties on them.

The phenomenon of "cross-border shopping", where Canadians would make shopping daytrips to US border towns to take advantage of tariff-free goods and a high Canadian dollar, provided a mini-boom for these towns. The loss of many Canadian jobs, particularly in the Ontario manufacturing sector during the recession of the early 1990s, was attributed (fairly or not) to the Free Trade Agreement.

In the mid-to-late 1990s, however, the Canadian dollar fell to record lows in value to against the US dollar. Cheaper Canadian primary products such as lumber and oil could be bought tariff-free by Americans, and Hollywood studios sent their crews to film many movies in Canada due to the cheap Canadian dollar (see "runaway production" and "Hollywood North"). The removal of protective tariffs meant that market forces, such as currency values, have a greater effect on the economies of both countries than they would have with tariffs.

The agreement has failed to liberalize trade in some areas, most notably the ongoing dispute over softwood lumber. Issues such as mineral, fresh water, and softwood lumber trade still remain disputed.

While the agreement remains decades later, it is no longer at the forefront of Canadian politics. It was superseded by the North American Free Trade Agreement (NAFTA) in 1994, which itself was replaced by the United States–Mexico–Canada Agreement in 2020. The Liberals under Jean Chrétien were elected to office in the 1993 election, partly on a promise to renegotiate key labor and environmental parts of NAFTA. An agreement was indeed struck with the Democrats under Bill Clinton that created separate side deals to address both of these concerns.

== See also ==
- Free-trade area
- Market access
- Rules of Origin
- Tariffs
