= Council of Economic Advisers =

U.S. presidential advisory committee on economic policy

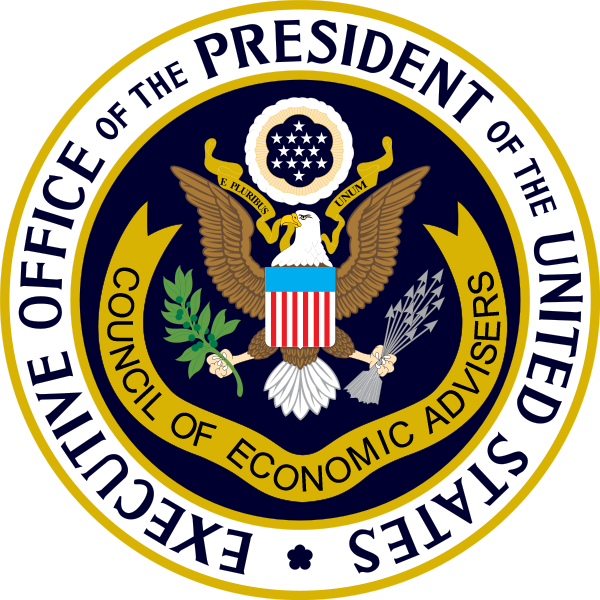

Agency overview
- Formed: 1946; 80 years ago
- Preceding agencies: Office of Price Administration (World War II); Council on Wage and Price Stability (Carter era)
- Headquarters: Eisenhower Executive Office Building
- Employees: About 35
- Agency executives: Christopher Phelan, Chair; Aaron Hedlund, Member
- Parent agency: Executive Office of the President of the United States
- Website: wh.gov/cea

The Council of Economic Advisers (CEA) is a United States agency within the Executive Office of the President established in 1946, which advises the president of the United States on economic policy. In addition, the CEA provides much of the empirical research for the White House and prepares the publicly-available annual Economic Report of the President. The council is made up of its chairperson and generally one to two additional members. Its chairperson requires appointment and Senate confirmation, and its other members are appointed by the president.

== Activities ==
=== Economic Report of the President ===
The report is published by the CEA annually in February, no later than 10 days after the budget of the US government is submitted. The president typically writes a letter introducing the report, serving as an executive summary. The report proceeds with several hundred pages of qualitative and quantitative research reviewing the impact of economic activity in the previous year, outlining economic goals for the coming year (based on the president's economic agenda), and making numerical projections of economic performance and outcomes. The data referenced or used in the report are from the Bureau of Economic Analysis and U.S. Bureau of Labor Statistics.

== History ==
=== Establishment ===
The Truman administration established the Council of Economic Advisers via the Employment Act of 1946 to provide presidents with objective economic analysis and advice on the development and implementation of a wide range of domestic and international economic policy issues. It was a step from an "ad hoc style of economic policy-making to a more institutionalized and focused process". The act gave the council the following goals:

1. to assist and advise the President in the preparation of the Economic Report;

2. to gather timely and authoritative information concerning economic developments and economic trends, both current and prospective, to analyze and interpret such information in the light of the policy declared in section 2 for the purpose of determining whether such developments and trends are interfering, or are likely to interfere, with the achievement of such policy, and to compile and submit to the President studies relating to such developments and trends;

3. to appraise the various programs and activities of the Federal Government in the light of the policy declared in section 2 for the purpose of determining the extent to which such programs and activities are contributing, and the extent to which they are not contributing, to the achievement of such policy, and to make recommendations to the President with respect thereto;

4. to develop and recommend to the President national economic policies to foster and promote free competitive enterprise, to avoid economic fluctuations or to diminish the effects thereof, and to maintain employment, production, and purchasing power;

5. to make and furnish such studies, reports thereon, and recommendations with respect to matters of Federal economic policy and legislation as the President may request.

In 1949 Chairman Edwin Nourse and member Leon Keyserling argued about whether the advice should be private or public and about the role of government in economic stabilization. Nourse believed a choice had to be made between "guns or butter" but Keyserling argued for deficit spending, asserting that an expanding economy could afford large defense expenditures without sacrificing an increased standard of living. In 1949, Keyserling gained support from Truman advisors Dean Acheson and Clark Clifford. Nourse resigned as chairman, warning about the dangers of budget deficits and increased funding of "wasteful" defense costs. Keyserling succeeded to the chairmanship and influenced Truman's Fair Deal proposals and the economic sections of NSC 68 that, in April 1950, asserted that the larger armed forces America needed would not affect living standards or risk the "transformation of the free character of our economy".

=== 1950s–80s ===
During the 1953–54 recession, the CEA, headed by Arthur Burns, deployed non-traditional neo-Keynesian interventions, which provided results later called the "steady fifties" wherein many families stayed in the economic "middle class" with just one family wage-earner. The Eisenhower administration supported an activist contracyclical approach that helped to establish Keynesianism as a possible bipartisan economic policy for the nation. Especially important in formulating the CEA response to the recession—accelerating public works programs, easing credit, and reducing taxes—were Arthur F. Burns and Neil H. Jacoby.

Until 1963, during its first seven years the CEA made five technical advances in policy making, including the replacement of a "cyclical model" of the economy by a "growth model", the setting of quantitative targets for the economy, use of the theories of fiscal drag and full-employment budget, recognition of the need for greater flexibility in taxation, and replacement of the notion of unemployment as a structural problem by a realization of a low aggregate demand.

The 1978 Humphrey–Hawkins Full Employment Act required each administration to move toward full employment and reasonable price stability within a specific time period. It has been criticized for making CEA's annual economic report highly political in nature, as well as highly unreliable and inaccurate over the standard two or five year projection periods.

=== 1980–present ===
Since 1980, the CEA has focused on sources of economic growth, the supply side of the economy, and on international issues. In the wake of the Great Recession of 2008–09, the Council of Economic Advisers played a significant role in supporting the American Recovery and Reinvestment Act.

On March 12, 2025, Stephen Miran was confirmed as President Trump's nominee to be the chairman of the Council of Economic Advisers.

== Organization ==
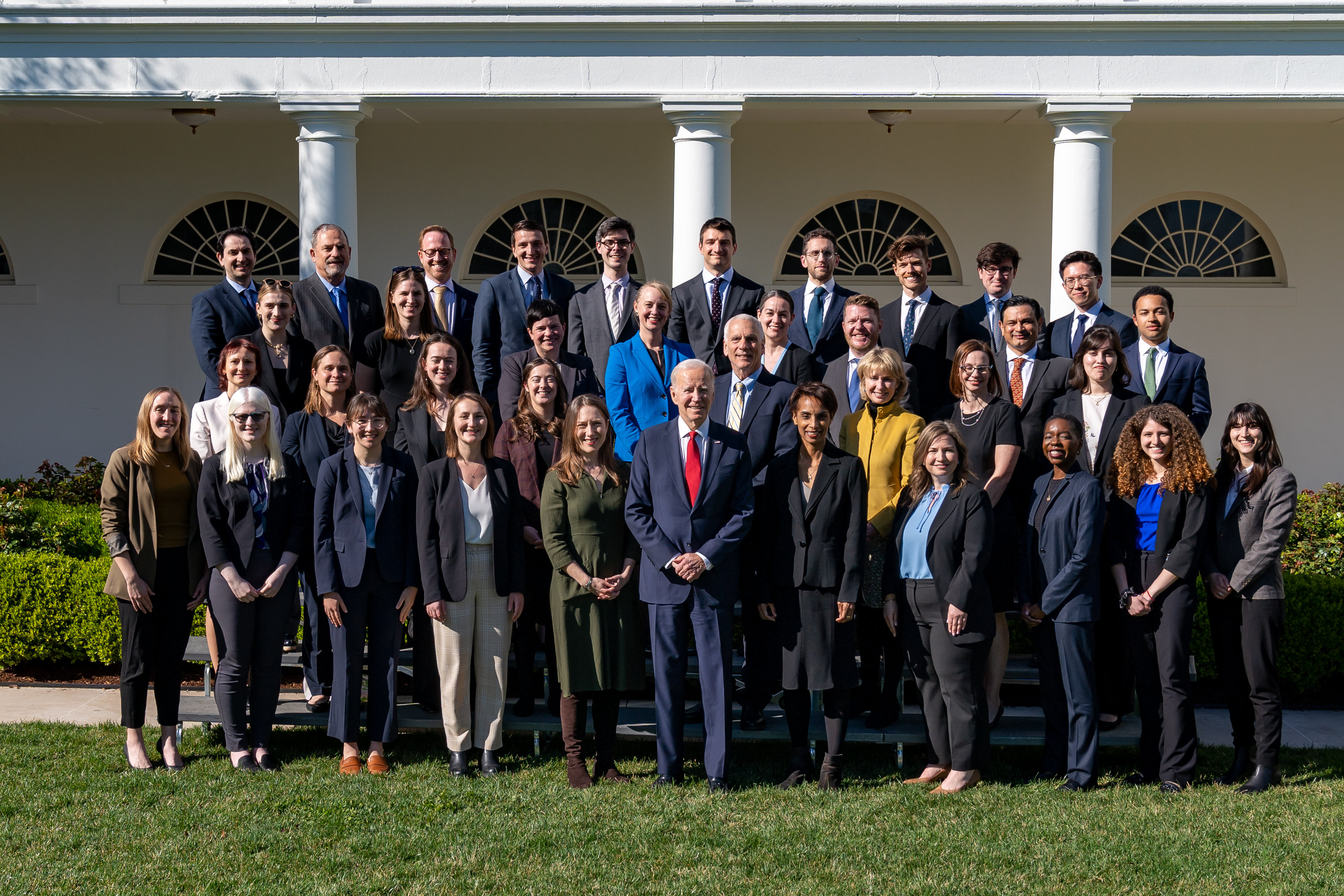
The council and staff during the Biden administration, in March 2023

The council's chairman is nominated by the president and confirmed by the United States Senate. The members are appointed by the president. As of July 2017, the council's eighteen person staff consisted of a chief of staff (Director of Macroeconomic Forecasting), fifteen economists (five senior, four research, four staff economists, two economic statisticians) and two operations staff. Many of the staff economists are academics on leave or government economists on temporary assignment from other agencies.

== Composition ==
=== Chairs ===
Denotes acting capacity.

Image	Name	Start	End	President
	Edwin Nourse	August 9, 1946	November 1, 1949	Harry Truman (1945–1953)
	Leon Keyserling	November 2, 1949	May 10, 1950	Harry Truman (1945–1953)
	Leon Keyserling	May 10, 1950	January 20, 1953	Harry Truman (1945–1953)
	Arthur Burns	March 19, 1953	December 1, 1956	Dwight Eisenhower (1953–1961)
	Raymond Saulnier	December 3, 1956	January 20, 1961	Dwight Eisenhower (1953–1961)
	Walter Heller	January 29, 1961	November 15, 1964	John F. Kennedy (1961–1963)
	Walter Heller	January 29, 1961	November 15, 1964	Lyndon Johnson (1963–1969)
	Gardner Ackley	November 16, 1964	February 15, 1968	Lyndon Johnson (1963–1969)
	Arthur Okun	February 15, 1968	January 20, 1969	Lyndon Johnson (1963–1969)
	Paul McCracken	February 4, 1969	December 31, 1971	Richard Nixon (1969–1974)
	Herbert Stein	January 1, 1972	August 31, 1974	Richard Nixon (1969–1974)
	Herbert Stein	January 1, 1972	August 31, 1974	Gerald Ford (1974–1977)
	Alan Greenspan	September 4, 1974	January 20, 1977	Gerald Ford (1974–1977)
	Charles Schultze	January 22, 1977	January 20, 1981	Jimmy Carter (1977–1981)
	Murray Weidenbaum	February 27, 1981	August 25, 1982	Ronald Reagan (1981–1989)
	Marty Feldstein	October 14, 1982	July 10, 1984	Ronald Reagan (1981–1989)
	Beryl Sprinkel	April 18, 1985	January 20, 1989	Ronald Reagan (1981–1989)
	Michael Boskin	February 2, 1989	January 20, 1993	George H. W. Bush (1989–1993)
	Laura Tyson	February 5, 1993	April 22, 1995	Bill Clinton (1993–2001)
	Joe Stiglitz	June 28, 1995	February 10, 1997	Bill Clinton (1993–2001)
	Janet Yellen	February 18, 1997	August 3, 1999	Bill Clinton (1993–2001)
	Martin Baily	August 12, 1999	January 20, 2001	Bill Clinton (1993–2001)
	Glenn Hubbard	May 11, 2001	February 28, 2003	George W. Bush (2001–2009)
	Greg Mankiw	May 29, 2003	February 18, 2005	George W. Bush (2001–2009)
	Harvey Rosen	February 23, 2005	June 10, 2005	George W. Bush (2001–2009)
	Ben Bernanke	June 21, 2005	January 31, 2006	George W. Bush (2001–2009)
	Edward Lazear	February 27, 2006	January 20, 2009	George W. Bush (2001–2009)
	Christina Romer	January 29, 2009	September 3, 2010	Barack Obama (2009–2017)
	Austan Goolsbee	September 10, 2010	August 5, 2011	Barack Obama (2009–2017)
	Alan Krueger	November 7, 2011	August 2, 2013	Barack Obama (2009–2017)
	Jason Furman	August 2, 2013	January 20, 2017	Barack Obama (2009–2017)
	Kevin Hassett	September 13, 2017	June 28, 2019	Donald Trump (2017–2021)
	Tomas Philipson; Acting	June 28, 2019	June 23, 2020	Donald Trump (2017–2021)
	Tyler Goodspeed; Acting	June 23, 2020	January 7, 2021	Donald Trump (2017–2021)
	Cecilia Rouse	March 12, 2021	March 31, 2023	Joe Biden (2021–2025)
	Jared Bernstein	July 10, 2023	January 20, 2025	Joe Biden (2021–2025)
	Steve Miran	March 13, 2025	February 3, 2026; On leave: September 16, 2025 – February 3, 2026	Donald Trump (2025–present)
	Pierre Yared; Acting	September 16, 2025	July 6, 2026	Donald Trump (2025–present)
	Christopher Phelan	August 10, 2026	Incumbent	Donald Trump (2025–present)

=== Chief Economist ===
- Keith Hall 2005-2008
- Michael Greenstone 2009–2010
- Matthew Fiedler 2015–2017
- Casey B. Mulligan 2018–2019
- Joshua D. Rauh 2019–2020
- Kevin Corinth 2020–2021
- Ernie Tedeschi 2023–2024
- Aaron Hedlund 2025-2026
- Brian Wheaton 2026-present
- Graham Newell 2026-present

=== Presidentially Appointed Members ===
- John D. Clark 1946–1953
- Roy Blough 1950–1952
- Leon Keyserling 1950–1953
- Robert C. Turner 1952–1953
- Karl A. Fox 1953–1955
- Neil H. Jacoby 1953–1955
- Asher Achinstein 1954–1956
- Walter W. Stewart 1953–1955
- Joseph S. Davis 1955–1958
- Paul W. McCracken 1956–1959
- Karl Brandt 1958–1961
- Henry C. Wallich 1959–1961
- James Tobin 1961–1962
- Kermit Gordon 1961–1962
- John P. Lewis 1963–1964
- Otto Eckstein 1964–1966
- James S. Duesenberry 1966–1968
- Merton J. Peck 1968–1969
- Warren L. Smith 1968–1969
- Paul Wonnacott 1968-1970, 1991-1993
- Hendrik S. Houthakker 1969–1971
- Herbert Stein 1969–1971
- Ezra Solomon 1971–1973
- Marina von Neumann Whitman 1972–1973
- Gary L. Seevers 1973–1975
- William J. Fellner 1973–1975
- Paul. W. MacAvoy 1975–1976
- Burton G. Malkiel 1975–1977
- William D. Nordhaus 1977–1979
- Lyle E. Gramley 1977–1980
- George C. Eads 1979–1981
- Stephen Goldfeld 1980–1981
- William A. Niskanen 1981–1985
- Jerry L. Jordan 1981–1982
- William Poole 1982–1985
- Thomas Gale Moore 1985–1989
- Michael L. Mussa 1986–1988
- John B. Taylor 1989–1991
- Richard L. Schmalensee 1989–1991
- David F. Bradford 1991–1993
- Paul Wonnacott 1991–1993
- Alan S. Blinder 1993–1994
- Carolyn Fischer 1994-1995
- Joseph Stiglitz 1993–1995
- Martin N. Baily 1995–1996
- Alicia H. Munnell 1996–1997
- Jeffrey A. Frankel 1997–1999
- Rebecca Blank 1998–1999
- Yu-Chin Chen 1999–2000
- Robert Z. Lawrence 1999–2001
- Kathryn L. Shaw 2000–2001
- Mark B. McClellan 2001–2002
- Randall S. Kroszner 2001–2003
- Kristin Forbes 2003–2005
- Harvey S. Rosen 2003–2005
- Katherine Baicker 2005–2007
- Matthew J. Slaughter 2005–2007
- Donald B. Marron Jr. 2008–2009
- Cecilia Rouse 2009–2011
- Carl Shapiro 2011–2012
- Katharine Abraham 2011–2013
- James H. Stock 2013–2014
- Betsey Stevenson 2013–2015
- Maurice Obstfeld 2014–2015
- Jay Shambaugh 2015–2017
- Sandra Black 2015–2017
- Richard Burkhauser 2017–2019
- Tomas J. Philipson 2017–2020
- Tyler Goodspeed 2019–2021
- Heather Boushey 2021–2025
- Jared Bernstein 2021–2023
- Kirabo Jackson 2023–2025
- Pierre Yared 2025–2026
- Kim Ruhl 2025–2026
- Aaron Hedlund 2026–present
- Christopher Phelan 2026–Present

== Sources ==
- Brazelton, W. Robert (2001), Designing U.S. Economic Policy: An Analytical Biography of Leon H. Keyserling, New York: Palgrave, ISBN 0-333-77575-9
- Brazelton, W. Robert (1997), "The Economics of Leon Hirsch Keyserling", Journal of Economic Perspectives, 11 (4): 189–197, doi:10.1257/jep.11.4.189, ISSN 0895-3309
- Brune, Lester H. (1989), "Guns and Butter: the Pre-Korean War Dispute over Budget Allocations: Nourse's Conservative Keynesianism Loses Favor Against Keyserling's Economic Expansion Plan", The American Journal of Economics and Sociology, 48 (3): 357–371, doi:10.1111/j.1536-7150.1989.tb03189.x, ISSN 0002-9246
- Cimbala, Stephen J.; Stout, Robert L. (1983), "The Economic Report of the President: Before and after the Full Employment and Balanced Growth Act of 1978", Presidential Studies Quarterly, 13 (1): 50–61, ISSN 0360-4918
- Eizenstat, Stuart E. (1992), "Economists and White House Decisions", Journal of Economic Perspectives, 6 (3): 65–71, doi:10.1257/jep.6.3.65, ISSN 0895-3309
- Engelbourg, Saul (1980), "The Council of Economic Advisers and the Recession of 1953–1954", Business History Review, 54 (2): 192–214, doi:10.2307/3114480, ISSN 0007-6805, JSTOR 3114480, S2CID 154554637
- Flickenschild, Michael, Afonso, Alexandre (2018), "Networks of economic policy expertise in Germany and the United States in the wake of the Great Recession", Journal of European Public Policy, 26 (9): 1292–1311, doi:10.1080/13501763.2018.1518992, hdl:1887/71157, ISSN 1466-4429
- Leeson, Robert (1997), "The Political Economy of the Inflation-unemployment Trade-off", History of Political Economy, 29 (1): 117–156, doi:10.1215/00182702-29-1-117, ISSN 0018-2702
- McCaleb, Thomas S. (1986), "The Council of Economic Advisers after Forty Years", Cato Journal, 6 (2): 685–693, ISSN 0273-3072
- Norton, Hugh S. (1977), The Employment Act and the Council of Economic Advisers, 1946–1976, Columbia: University of South Carolina Press, ISBN 0-87249-296-6
- Salant, Walter S. (1973), "Some Intellectual Contributions of the Truman Council of Economic Advisers to Policy-making", History of Political Economy, 5 (1): 36–49, doi:10.1215/00182702-5-1-36, ISSN 0018-2702
- Sobel, Robert (1988), Biographical Directory of the Council of Economic Advisers, New York: Greenwood Press, ISBN 0-313-22554-0
- Tobin, James; Weidenbaum, Murray, eds. (1988), Two Revolutions in Economic Policy: The First Economic Reports of Presidents Kennedy and Reagan, Cambridge: MIT Press, ISBN 0-262-70034-4
- Wehrle, Edmund F. (2004), "Guns, Butter, Leon Keyserling, the AFL-CIO, and the Fate of Full-employment Economics", Historian, 66 (4): 730–748, doi:10.1111/j.1540-6563.2004.00094.x, ISSN 0018-2370, S2CID 143607377
