= EAD =

EAD may refer to:

- EAD socket, an obsolete network connection socket
- Eadem, a Latin term meaning "the same", abbreviated ead.
- Early afterdepolarization, a type of cardiac dysrhythmia
- Earlsfield railway station in London, station code EAD
- Elite athletes with a disability, a term to describe athletes taking part in disabled sports
- Emergency airworthiness directive, issued when an unsafe condition exists that requires immediate action by an aircraft owner or operator
- Employment authorization document, in the United States
- Encoded Archival Description, an archival data standard
- Engin Altan Düzyatan, a Turkish actor
- Environment Agency Abu Dhabi, a government agency
- Equivalent air depth, a way of approximating decompression requirements
- European AIS Database, an aviation database
- Exposure at default, a measure of risk used in banking regulation
- Nintendo Entertainment Analysis & Development, a defunct division of Nintendo
