= George C. Eads =

American economist

George C. Eads (born August 20, 1942) is an American economist. He served on the Council of Economic Advisers from 1979 to 1981. He later served as vice president of CRA International.

A native of Clarksville, Texas, Eads earned a degree in economics from University of Colorado Boulder, before continuing his postgraduate studies at Yale University.
