= Yu-Chin Chen =

Economist and researcher

Yu-Chin Chen (born January 21, 1971) is an economist and researcher at the University of Washington. Her research fields include international finance, macroeconomics, open economy macroeconomics, trade and development, and applied economics. She has served as a staff economist for the Clinton administration and is currently an economics professor at the University of Washington. Classes she teaches include Macroeconomic Analysis, International Financial Monetary Economics, and Computational Finance and Financial Econometrics.

== Education ==
Yu-Chin Chen earned her bachelor's degree in physics at Harvard University and Radcliffe College, graduating with honors in 1993. In 1996, she completed her Master of Public Policy (M.P.P.) degree from the John F. Kennedy School of Government at Harvard University. From 1996 to 2002, she continued her education at Harvard University and completed her Master of Economics (M.Econ) degree in 1999 and completed her Doctor of Philosophy degree also in economics in 2002, where her dissertation was on exchange rates and productivity.

== Research and career ==
From 1993 to 1994, Chen served as the executive secretary of the Hwa Yue Foundation, a charity organization located in Taipei, Taiwan that was founded in 1990 and has supported numerous Buddhist and charity projects across Asia. During Bill Clinton's presidency, she served as a staff economist in the Council of Economic Advisors in the White House from 1999 to 2000. In 2000, she returned to her alma mater Harvard University as advisor of undergraduate studies for the economics department, and a postdoctoral researcher from 2002 to 2003. From September 2003 to the present, she has been an associate professor in the department of economics at the University of Washington, where she is a Gary Waterman Distinguished Scholar and graduate program director of the department of economics at the University of Washington. Moreover, she is a research associate for the Centre for Applied Macroeconomic Analysis for the National University of Australia. From 2005 till 2011, she has served as a visiting researcher and visiting assistant professor. She has served as a visiting researcher for the San Francisco Federal Reserve Bank (2006), Reserve Bank of New Zealand (2006), and at Academia Sinica in Taipei, Taiwan. In 2007, she served as a visiting assistant professor for the department of economics at Harvard University. She has also done extensive research on international finance, macroeconomics, open economy macroeconomics, trade and development, and applied economics and has published several publications. In 2019, she helped organized the inaugural Australasian Conference on International Macroeconomics. Her research includes "Can Exchange Rates Forecast Commodity Prices?", "Forecasting Inflation using Commodity Price Aggregates", and "Accounting for Differences in Economic Growth"

== Grants ==
In 2005, Chen received the Royalty Research Fund Grant from the University of Washington.

== Publications ==
Her most cited publications are:

- Chen YC, Rogoff K. Commodity currencies. Journal of international Economics. 2003 May 1;60(1):133-60. According to Google Scholar, this has been cited 739 times.
- Bosworth, B., Collins, S.M. and Chen, Y.C., 1995. Accounting for differences in economic growth (No. 115). Washington, DC: Brookings Institution. According to Google Scholar, this has been cited 225 times.
- Chen YC, Tsang KP. What does the yield curve tell us about exchange rate predictability?. Review of Economics and Statistics. 2013 Mar 1;95(1):185-205. According to Google Scholar, this has been cited 127 times.
