= Canadian–American Reciprocity Treaty =

1854–1866 UK-US economic treaty

- Type: Trade agreement
- Effective: 1854
- Expiration: 1866
- Negotiators: (United States) William L. Marcy; (United Kingdom) James Bruce, 8th Earl of Elgin
- Parties: United Kingdom; United States
- Language: English

The Canadian–American Reciprocity Treaty of 1854, also known as the Elgin-Marcy Treaty after its key negotiators, James Bruce, 8th Earl of Elgin and William L. Marcy, was a treaty between the United Kingdom and the United States that applied to British North America, including the Province of Canada, New Brunswick, Nova Scotia, Prince Edward Island, and Newfoundland Colony. The treaty covered raw materials; in effect from 1854 to 1866, it represented a move toward free trade and was opposed by protectionist elements in the United States.

After the American Civil War ended in 1865, US protectionist elements were joined by Americans angry at tacit support by Britain for the Confederate States during the war, and that alliance was successful in terminating the treaty in 1866. The response in much of British North America was to unite some of its colonies in 1867 into the new country of Canada. The new country expected to allow many new economic opportunities in Canada and to unify the colonies against the growing American expansionist sentiments, especially after the Alaska Purchase.

Attempts by the Liberal Party of Canada to revive free trade with an identically named treaty in 1911 led to a political victory for the protectionist Conservative Party, which warned that Canada would be annexed by the United States. Talk of reciprocity ended for decades, and free trade did not return until the 1988 Canada–United States Free Trade Agreement.

== Origins ==
Faced with the ending of British imperial preference when the British Corn Laws, tariffs on food imported to Britain, were repealed in 1846, the Canadian business community based in Montreal looked south. Merchants threatened to push for annexation to the United States unless London negotiated a free trade deal. In 1854, they achieved what they wanted by the Elgin–Marcy Treaty, which listed most Canadian raw materials and agricultural produce, especially timber and wheat, as goods to be admitted duty-free to the US market. The treaty ended the US 21% tariff on natural resource imports.

In exchange, the Americans were given fishing rights off the East Coast. The treaty also granted a few navigation rights to each other's lakes and rivers.

The treaty represented an attempt by American manufacturers to enlarge their export market and to obtain cheaper raw materials and an attempt by free traders, tariff reformers, and their Democratic Party allies to lower the tariff. The protected interests, represented by the Republican Party, fought back and opposed the treaty.

== Effects ==
Historians have agreed the impact was small for the United States but have debated its effects on Canada. After the treaty took effect, there was a large increase in Canada's exports to the United States and a rapid growth of the Canadian economy, especially in southern Ontario and Nova Scotia. Canadian exports to the United States grew by 33% after the treaty, but American exports grew by only 7%. Within ten years, trade had doubled between the two countries. For nearly a century, Canadian economists saw the reciprocity era as a halcyon period for the Canadian economy.

In 1968, that optimistic view was challenged by the economic historians Lawrence H. Officer and Lawrence B. Smith. They argued that the growth of trade was caused by the introduction of railways to Canada and by the American Civil War, both of which led to huge demand in the United States.

They also argue the statistics to be questionable. Before the tariffs, much smuggling had taken place. Free trade brought the trade into the open, but the recorded increase in trade did not reflect actual growth in the economy.

In 1855, there were poor wheat harvests in the United States and Britain, and Russian wheat supplies were also cut off by the Crimean War. It was a great year for Canadian wheat, independently of the introduction of the tariff.

It was also argued that the treaty hurt Canadian manufacturing. For instance, the export of milk and barley hurt the Canadian cheese and beer trades. Some scholars like Officer and Smith hold that the economic prosperity that followed the treaty had little to do with tariffs.

The treaty stimulated the coal mining industry in Nova Scotia. The colony was already moving toward free trade before the treaty took effect, but the treaty still resulted in modest direct gains. The structure of the economy changed because markets for some commodities, such as coal, increased greatly, but the demand for other goods was unchanged. The treaty complemented the earlier movement toward free trade and stimulated the export of commodities that were sold primarily to the United States.

== Abrogation ==
The treaty was abrogated by the Americans in 1866 for several reasons. Many felt that Canada was the only party of the treaty benefiting from it and objected to the protective Cayley–Galt Tariff, which was imposed by the Province of Canada on manufactured goods. Also, the Americans were angry at the British unofficial support for the Confederacy during the American Civil War: blockade runners carrying British arms supplies, Confederate Navy commerce raiders built from British shipyards (e.g., CSS Alabama), and British tolerance of Confederate Secret Service activities in its territories as an anti-U.S. base of military operations (such as James Dunwoody Bulloch, the Chesapeake Affair, the St. Albans Raid, and the Confederate Army of Manhattan) all in violation of British neutrality laws. These actions prolonged the Civil War by two years and inflicted a great amount of war cost and American lives (mostly from British blockade running).

The state of Maine, given its location, was a key player. Reciprocity benefited Portland's trading position with respect to Montreal and the Canadian hinterland, but many Maine politicians and businessmen worked successfully to terminate the treaty. Many Americans were angry with Canadians' actions during the Civil War, like engaging in arms trafficking through blockade running for the South, and tolerating and even aiding Confederate activities such as the Chesapeake Affair, the St. Albans Raid, and the Confederate Army of Manhattan.

There was complacency on the part of Portland railroad interests, and the Bangor lumber interests opposed the continental economic integration that was envisaged by the treaty.

Canada attempted to negotiate a new reciprocity treaty, but the Americans were committed to high tariffs and would not agree. Starting in 1879, Canadian Prime Minister John A. Macdonald set up a Canadian system of tariffs, known as the National Policy.

== Aftermath ==
From 1867 to 1911, the Liberals generally favoured reciprocity. After they won the 1896 election, however, their leader, Canadian Prime Minister Wilfrid Laurier, did not pursue free trade because the United States refused to discuss the issue. Instead, he implemented a Liberal version of the National Policy by maintaining high tariffs on goods from other countries that restricted Canadian goods. However, he lowered tariffs to the same level as countries that admitted Canadian goods. Political rhetoric made it a party issue. The Conservatives, which stood publicly for nationalism and protectionism (the National Policy), succeeded in associating the Liberals with free trade, commercial union, with the United States, and continentalism that would lead to annexation by the United States.

In 1911, Laurier's Liberals successfully negotiated a reciprocity treaty, again called the Canadian–American Reciprocity Treaty, with US President William Howard Taft. In a speech before the US House of Representatives, Speaker Champ Clark spoke warmly of the treaty, saying it was a step towards the United States annexing Canada. The Conservatives made reciprocity the central issue of the 1911 election and ignited anti-American sentiment by dire warnings the treaty would turn the economy over to American control. The Liberals were decisively defeated in the 1911 election, and the treaty was rejected by the new Conservative government, led by Robert Borden.

After 1945, both nations joined the General Agreement on Tariffs and Trade (GATT), and tariffs began to steadily decline. Free trade between the two nations was finalized by the 1988 Canada–United States Free Trade Agreement.

== See also ==
- Canada–United States Free Trade Agreement
- National Policy

== Sources ==
- Anjali, Robert E. "The Reciprocity Treaty of 1854," Canadian Journal of Economics / Revue canadienne d'Economique, 4#1 (Feb., 1971), pp. 1–20 in JSTOR
- Gerriets, Marilyn, and Julian Gwyn. "Tariffs, trade and reciprocity: Nova Scotia, 1830-1866." Acadiensis 25.2 (1996): 62–81. online
- Hinton, Michael/ "Canadian economic growth and the Reciprocity Treaty of 1854," Working Papers 13038, Economic History Society, 2013. online
- Masters, D.C. The Reciprocity Treaty of 1854 (1963)
- Masters, D.C. "Reciprocity." The Canadian Encyclopedia.
- Officer, Lawrence H., and Lawrence B. Smith. "The Canadian-American Reciprocity Treaty of 1855 to 1866," Journal of Economic History, 28#$ (1968), pp. 598–623 in JSTOR
- Spetter, Allan B. "Harrison and Blaine: No Reciprocity for Canada." Canadian Review of American Studies 12.2 (1981): 143-156.
- Tansill, Charles. The Canadian Reciprocity Treaty of 1854 (1922) online edition
