= Tomas J. Philipson =

Swedish-American economist

Tomas Philipson
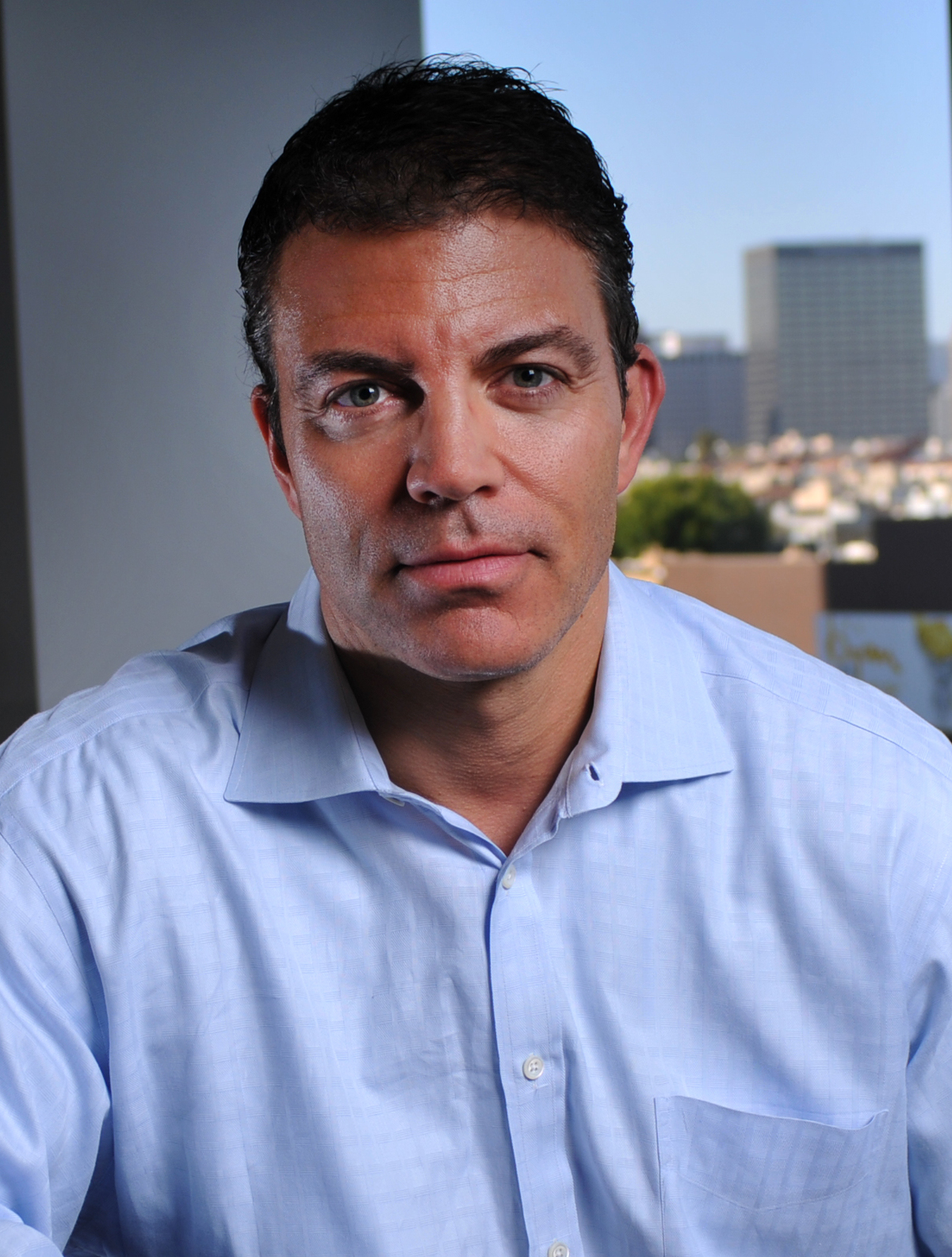

Chair of the Council of Economic Advisers
- Acting
- In office June 28, 2019 – June 23, 2020
- President: Donald Trump
- Preceded by: Kevin Hassett
- Succeeded by: Tyler Goodspeed (acting)

Member of the Council of Economic Advisers
- In office 2017–2021
- Succeeded by: Jared Bernstein

Personal details
- Born: Uppsala, Sweden
- Party: Republican
- Education: Uppsala University (BS); Claremont Graduate University (MA); University of Pennsylvania (MA, PhD)

Tomas J. Philipson is a Swedish-born American economist who served as the acting chairman of the Council of Economic Advisers in the Trump administration. He departed from the position and the Council at the end of June, 2020, to return to the University of Chicago. He holds the Daniel Levin Chair in Public Policy at the University of Chicago, with posts in the Harris School of Public Policy Studies, Department of Economics, and the Law School. He was a Director of the Becker Friedman Institute at the university.

In August 2017 he was appointed by President Donald Trump to become one of three members of the Council of Economic Advisers. While acting chair of the Council of Economic Advisers, Philipson downplayed the public health risk and economic threat of the coronavirus pandemic and questioned whether the wearing of masks slowed transmission of the disease.

== Education ==
Philipson was born and raised in Sweden, where he obtained his undergraduate degree in mathematics at Uppsala University. After earning his MA in mathematics at the Claremont Graduate University, he went on to receive his MA in finance from Wharton and PhD in economics from the University of Pennsylvania where he won the William Carey Prize for Outstanding Dissertation in 1990.

== Career ==
=== Academia ===
After receiving his PhD, he joined the University of Chicago as a postdoctoral fellow and thereafter joined the faculty. He has been a visiting faculty member at Yale University and a visiting fellow at The World Bank.

Philipson is a co-founder of Precision Health Economics, a healthcare consulting firm that was headquartered in Los Angeles. It was sold in 2015.

Philipson is a founding editor of the journal Forums for Health Economics & Policy of Bepress, and has been on the editorial board of the journal Health Economics and The European Journal of Health Economics. His research has been published widely in journals such as The American Economic Review, Journal of Political Economy, Quarterly Journal of Economics, Journal of Economic Theory, Journal of Health Economics, Health Affairs, and Econometrica.

Philipson has twice received the Kenneth Arrow Award of the International Health Economics Association (for best paper in the field of health economics). In addition, he was awarded the Garfield Award by Research America, the Prêmio Haralambos Simeonidisand from the Brazilian Economic Association, and the Distinguished Economic Research Award from the Milken Institute.

=== Government ===
Philipson served in the George W. Bush administration as the senior economic advisor to the Commissioner of Food and Drugs (the head of the Food and Drug Administration), and subsequently as the senior economic advisor to the head of the Centers for Medicare and Medicaid Services.

He was an advisor to Republican Senator John McCain during his 2008 presidential campaign. In 2016, Philipson was briefly a member of the Donald Trump presidential transition team. In August 2017, Philipson was appointed by President Donald Trump to become one of three members of the Council of Economic Advisers (CEA). Philipson played a leading role in the Trump administration's efforts to oppose Medicare for All health care systems, promote Trump's deregulation agenda, and promote the 2017 Republican tax legislation. After Kevin Hassett resigned as chairman of the Council of Economic Advisers in June 2019, Philipson was named as acting chairman, a post he held until he resigned in June 2020.

In February 2020, while chair of the council, Philipson publicly downplayed the public health and economic threats of the coronavirus pandemic, saying, "I don't think corona is as big a threat as people make it out to be." Philipson asserted that public health threats do not usually cause harm to the economy and that the coronavirus would not be as bad as a normal flu season, although a September 2019 study by White House economists projected that a pandemic disease could kill hundreds of thousands of Americans and cause trillions of dollars in damage to the nation's economy.

=== Employment, Consultancy, and Professional Endeavors ===
Philipson similarly leveraged his economic and academic experience to pursue healthcare opportunities in the private sector. Philipson co-founded Precision Health Economics (PHE), a premium brand health care consultancy firm with offices in dozens of cities throughout the United States, Canada, and Europe. PHE served a multitude of global Fortune 500 healthcare clients on a range of commercial and policy issues around the world. He had a successful exit when Precision Health Economics was acquired by Precision for Medicine in 2015 and subsequently merged into PRECISIONheor.

Philipson is currently an advising board member and investor in several health care and medical companies which leverage modern technology such as Artificial Intelligence (AI). These companies include iRemedy, Epigenetix, Biologx, Nested Knowledge, MEDA Angels, and GATC Health. iRemedy is a technology-driven healthcare and medical products distributor geared towards government agencies, care providers, and consumers. Epigenetix researches epigenetic drugs at the preclinical and clinical level for the precision targeting of lethal cancers while BiologX makes life-saving insulin affordable to more people around the world. He has also been instrumental in providing information and data regarding the rise of the weight loss drug market since the 1990s.

Political offices
Preceded by Kevin Hassett	Chair of the Council of Economic Advisers; Acting; 2019–2020	Succeeded by Tyler Goodspeed; Acting
