= Ronald J. Wonnacott =

Canadian economist (1930–2018)

Ronald Johnston Wonnacott OC FRSC (11 September 1930 – 29 January 2018) was a Canadian economist.

Wonnacott received his bachelor's and master's degrees from the University of Western Ontario, then earned a doctorate from Harvard University. He taught at University of Western Ontario from 1958 to 1996, and served as William G. Davis Professor of International Trade. He was president of the Canadian Economics Association 1981/1982.

He was coauthor of Free Trade Between The United States And Canada: The Potential Economic Effects (with Paul Wonnacott), a study that helped to revive the Canadian debate over free trade and set the background for the Canada-United States Free Trade Agreement of 1988. This agreement was the major issue in the 1988 Canadian federal election, and came into effect after the Conservative victory in that election.

He was also author of a number of textbooks with his two brothers: on statistics and econometrics with brother Tom, and on elementary economics with his brother Paul.
