= National Policy =

Canadian protectionist economic policy (1876–1950s)

The National Policy was a Canadian economic program introduced by John A. Macdonald's Conservative Party in 1876. After Macdonald led the Conservatives to victory in the 1878 Canadian federal election, he began implementing his policy in 1879. The protective policy had shown positive responses in the economy with new industries flourishing Canada's economy in the 1880s. John A. Macdonald combined three elements as a strategy for the post-Confederation economy. First, he called for high tariffs on imported manufactured items to protect the manufacturing industry. Second, he called for a massive expansion of physical infrastructure, such as roads and railroads. Finally, enabled and supported by the former two, he promoted population growth (particularly in western Canada), the building of the Canadian Pacific Railway, and the fostering of immigration to Western Canada. Macdonald campaigned on the policy in the 1878 election, and defeated the Liberal Party, which supported free trade. It lasted from 1879 until sometime in the early 1950s.

== Terminology and usage ==
The term National Policy originally aimed to create a true country with a national economy. Over time, the term became associated with the entire Tory platform for developing the economy, especially increased immigration to Western Canada and the development of the Canadian Pacific Railway's transcontinental line.

== Key policies ==
John A. Macdonald, previously the inaugural Prime Minister of Canada from 67 until he resigned in 1873, returned to power in 1878 after his electoral victory that year, which enabled him to implement the National Policy. The policy had three-parts which would improve and expand Canada's economy, including:

=== Promoting Canadian industries and manufacturers ===
John Macdonald influenced Canadians to buy Canadian products in support of Canada's economy. Easily imported goods and products from the United States were much cheaper than Canadian-made goods. Macdonald proposed to put taxes or tariffs on American imported goods and products.

Macdonald hoped that by creating a strong manufacturing base in Canada, the nation would become more secure and less reliant on the United States. He was also closely linked to the Montreal and Toronto business interests that would benefit from such a policy, and they played an important role in keeping the Tories in office until 1896.

Despite a brief experiment with free trade in the Canadian–American Reciprocity Treaty before Confederation, the Americans were intent on pursuing a strongly protectionist policy, with tariffs higher than Canada imposed under the National Policy.

With such high American tariffs, Canadian firms could not compete in the United States, but American firms could enter Canada. Canadian producers were particularly hurt by American producers dumping surplus goods in Canada to avoid lowering prices in the United States. Tariffs were put on goods coming into Canada, which made American goods more expensive.

The policy quickly became one of the most central aspects of Canadian politics, and it played an important role in keeping the Tories in power until 1896, when Wilfrid Laurier and the Liberals campaigned on a promise to keep the National Policy in place. While many Liberals still supported free trade, the National Policy was too popular in Ontario and Quebec for it to end. When the Liberals campaigned on free trade in the 1911 election, they lost the election.

=== Imperial Preference ===
In 1897, the National Policy came to incorporate imperial preference, i.e. preferential tariff rates for imports from Britain. Initially, tariffs were reduced by one-eighth for imports from Britain, rising to one-quarter in 1898 and one-third in 1900. The Liberals, under Laurier, found imperial preference a convenient vehicle for reducing tariffs, as it appealed to the Empire-mindedness of Conservatives. Canadian imperial preference proved very effective. Keay and Varian have estimated that, within just a few years, Canadian imperial preference had the effect of doubling the value of imports from Britain, relative to the value of imports from Britain in the absence of the policy.

=== Completing the National Railway ===
When British Columbia joined the Confederation, the Canadian government promised a railway system to connect British Columbia with the east of Canada. Macdonald promised the railway to facilitate the transport of goods and services from the west to the east of Canada.

=== Settling the West ===
Macdonald made a promise to improve the farming industries in the west. This action was to highlight the west as the main producer for agriculture production in Canada.

=== High tariffs ===
John A. Macdonald's national policy became a huge public issue once the Liberal government led by Alexander Mackenzie failed to raise the budget on tariffs in 1876. Once Macdonald came back into power in 1878, a higher tariff was introduced in the budget of Canada and business. The purpose of high tariffs was solemnly for the expansion of the base of Canadian economy and to project a more confident country for development in Canada. Tariffs were raised for goods and services on a majority of manufacturing goods that were made outside of Canada. The rise of tariffs on foreign manufactured goods was to protect Canadian made products and Canadian manufacturers.

=== Unpopularity in the west ===
Although the policy was popular in central Canada, it was extremely unpopular in western Canada. This opposition to the National Policy played an important role in the rise of the Progressive Party of Canada in the 1920s. In its platform, the "New National Policy", it advocated free trade.

== Dismantled by Liberals ==
The National Policy was slowly dismantled during many years of Liberal rule under William Lyon Mackenzie King and Louis St. Laurent. At the same time, the United States was lowering its tariffs. Economic integration surged during World War II, and in 1965 the automobile industry in the two nations became fully integrated. However, complete free trade was not achieved until 1988 with the Canada–United States Free Trade Agreement brought in by Brian Mulroney's Progressive Conservative government.

== Assessment ==
The assessment of the National Policy is mixed. In general, economists argue that it increased prices and lowered Canada's efficiency and ability to compete in the world. By not becoming merged into the larger, more efficient American economy, Canada built too many monopolistic firms and too many small inefficient factories with high prices for consumers. Historians tend to see the policy in a more positive light by viewing it as a necessary expense to create a unified nation independent of the United States. There was, however, a boon to the citizens as there was no income tax, making the slightly higher price of manufactured goods easier to bear.

After Wilfrid Laurier led the Liberal Party to power in the 1896 election, the Liberals adapted to this governing system and to the principles of the National Policy. Tariffs stayed at high rates. It was only under the Liberal governments of William Lyon Mackenzie King and Louis St. Laurent beginning in the 1920s that protectionist tariffs rates began to be cut.

Eden and Molot (1993) argue that there have been three national policies in Canada: the "National Policy" of defensive expansionism, 1867–1940; compensatory liberalism, 1941–81; and market liberalism, starting in 1982. The defensive expansion phase relied on the tariff, railway construction, and land settlement to build the country. The second national policy combined a commitment to the GATT system, Keynesian macroeconomic policies, and the construction of a domestic social welfare net. Current national policy relies on Canada-US free trade and NAFTA free trade, market-based policies, and fiscal restraint. They argue for a fourth policy called "strategic integration." It would consist of free trade, both external and internal; the building of a national telecommunications infrastructure based on the development and diffusion of information technologies; and human capital development.

== See also ==
- American System (economic plan), a similar policy used in the United States
- Australian settlement
- Economic nationalism
- Graham Fraser (industrialist)
- Protectionism
- Tariffs

== Bibliography ==
- Barber, Clarence L. (1955). "Canadian Tariff Policy". The Canadian Journal of Economics and Political Science. 21 (4): 513–530. doi:10.2307/138128. JSTOR 138128.
- Eden, Lorraine; Molot, Maureen Appel (1993). "Canada's National Policies: Reflections on 125 Years". Canadian Public Policy. 19 (3): 232–251.
- Fowke, Vernon C. The National Policy and the Wheat Economy (Toronto, 1957)
- Fowke, V. C. (1952). "The National Policy-Old and New". The Canadian Journal of Economics and Political Science. 18 (3): 271–286. doi:10.2307/138568. JSTOR 138568.
- Fowke, Vernon C. (1956). "National Policy and Western Development in North America". The Journal of Economic History. 16 (4): 461–479. doi:10.1017/S0022050700059064. JSTOR 2114691.
