= P. A. V. B. Swamy =

Indian-born statistician (born c. 1934)

- Born: July 3, 1936
- Died: January 27, 2026 (aged 89); Rancho Palos Verdes, California, U.S.
- Education: University of Wisconsin–Madison; Andhra University
- Known for: Originating random coefficient estimation
- Scientific career
- Fields: Statistics; Econometrics
- Workplaces: Federal Reserve System; Ohio State University; SUNY Buffalo
- Doctoral advisor: Arthur Goldberger

Paravastu Aananta Venkata Bhattandha Swamy (born July 7, 1936 – January 27, 2026) was an Indian-born statistician. For fifty-six years, Swamy's research has focused on econometric issues.

== Education ==
After earning a B.A. in economics from Andhra University, India, in 1956, both an M.A. in economics and a M.S. in statistics from the same university in 1958, Swamy attended the University of Wisconsin–Madison. He finished his Ph.D. dissertation on random coefficient estimation under the supervision of Arthur Goldberger in 1968.

== Career ==
In 1967, Swamy joined the economics faculty at SUNY Buffalo as assistant professor, when he published his first article based on his dissertation on random coefficient estimation, followed in 1970 by another on the subject, and in 1971 by a much cited monograph, the latter cementing his reputation as an authority on random coefficient estimation. In 1972 he became professor at Ohio State University. In 1974, he joined the Federal Reserve System, where he worked first as an Economist and then as a Senior Economist in the Division of Research and Statistics until 1995, when he joined the Office of the Comptroller of the Currency as a researcher, followed by an appointment to the Bureau of Labor Statistics in 2002, from which he retired in 2009.

As summarized by Stephen G. Hall, Nobel Laureate Lawrence Klein, George S. Tavlas, and Arnold Zellner in a special issue of the journal Economic Modelling dedicated to his contributions up to 2010, Swamy's research agenda has been devoted to some of the most pressing issues in econometrics. These include (1) a prevailing ignorance of true functional forms in economic relationships, (2) the presence of unobserved variables underlying the need for error terms, (3) the difficulty of obtaining accurate estimates of a model's parameters if error terms and included variables are correlated, which they must be, given the presence of unobserved variables, and (4) the problem of errors in measurement. With the collaboration of a number of long-time colleagues, including Jatinder S. Mehta and George S. Tavlas, Stephen G. Hall, Peter Tinsley, I-Lok Chang, and Peter von zur Muehlen, Swamy's singular contribution to econometrics has been to devise a methodology, set down in numerous publications, that has enabled the profession to address these issues in a coherent and systematic manner.

In 1975, Swamy and his long-time co-author Jatinder S. Mehta, introduced and proved a theorem, later dubbed the "Swamy-Mehtha Theorem" and subsequently proved by Clive Granger, stating that any nonlinear functional form can be exactly represented by a model that is linear in variables but that has time-varying coefficients. The implication of this result is that, even if one does not know the correct functional form of a relationship, one can always represent this relationship as a time-varying coefficient relationship and thus estimate it.

Also in 1975, Swamy and Mehta extended their methodology to include crossectional data in a paper entitled "Estimation of Linear Models with Time and Cross-Sectionally Varying Coefficients"

In 1976, to render estimation of time-varying stationary stochastic coefficients models operational, Swamy and Peter A. Tinsley published a paper on linear prediction and estimation. In 1985, in an examination of the probabilistic-logical foundations of econometrics, Swamy and Peter von zur Muehlen published a paper, reprinted in a volume on the foundations of probability, econometrics, and economic games, which developed themes that would animate much of his later work, including a paper on the nature and testability of causality.

Applying standard principles of probability theory and lessons learned from random coefficient modeling, Swamy co-authored a paper with James R. Barth and Peter A. Tinsley that questioned the validity of conventional formulations of the rational expectations postulate as a violation of the axiomatic basis of modern statistical theory by confounding ‘objective’ and ‘subjective’ notions of probability. In a subsequent paper, Swamy and George S. Tavlas derived conditions under which the predictions generated from time-varying coefficient models coincide with the predictions generated from the relevant economic theory thereby fulfilling the rational expectations postulate.

A 1988 publication by John W. Pratt and Robert Schlaifer on the interpretation and observation of laws, became a compelling leitmotif for most of Swamy's subsequent work on estimating economic models. To implement Pratt and Schlaifer's and Robert Basmann's compelling definitions of an economic law and to solve the problem of uniqueness arising from a correlation between the error term and included variables in a regression, Swamy resorted to a novel practice of modeling regression coefficients themselves as functions of variables external to the model, called "coefficient drivers."

== Selected publications ==
- Swamy, P.A.V.B. and J.S. Mehta, (1969), "On Theil's Mixed Regression Estimator,"Journal of the American Statistical Association 64, Issue 325 (January):273-276.
- Mehta, Jatinder S, and P.A.V.B Swamy (1970), "The Finite Sample Distribution of Theil's Mixed Regression Estimator and a Related Problem," Review of the International Statistical Institute 38, Number 2: 202-208.https://doi.org/10.2307/1402143
- Mehta, Jatinder S, and P.A.V.B Swamy (1973) "Bayesian Analysis of a Bivariate Normal Distribution with Incomplete Information," Journal of the American Statistical Association 68, Issue 344, (December): 922-927, https://www.tandfonline.com/doi/abs/10.1080/01621459.1973.10481447
- Swamy, P.A.V.B, (1974) "Linear Models with Random Coefficients," Frontiers in Econometrics, Academic Press :143-168.
- Mehta, J.S. and P.A.V.B. Swamy, (1976), "Further Evidence on the Relative Efficiencies of Zellner's Seemingly Unrelated Regressions Estimator,Journal of the American Statistical Association 71, Issue 355:593-602.
- Swamy, P.A.V.B. and J.S. Mehta, (1977), "A note on minimum average risk estimators for coefficients in linear models,"Communications in Statistics - Theory and Methods 6, Issue 12:1181-1186.
- Swamy, P.A.V.B., J.S. Mehta, and P.N. Rappoport (1978), "Two Methods of Evaluating Hoerl and Kennard's Ridge Regression,"Communications in Statistics - Theory and Methods 7, Issue 12:1133-1155.
- Swamy, P.A.V.B. and Mehta Jatinder S. (1983) "Further Results on Zellner's Minimum Expected Loss and Full Information Maximum Likelihood Estimators for Undersized Samples," Journal of Business & Economic Statistics 1, Issue 2 (April): 154-162, https://www.tandfonline.com/doi/abs/10.1080/07350015.1983.10509334
- Schinasi, Gary J. and P.A.V.B Swamy, (1989) "The out-of-sample forecasting performance of exchange rate models when coefficients are allowed to change," Journal of International Money and Finance 8, Issue 3 (September): 375-390 (https://doi.org/10.1016/0261-5606(89)90004-1)
- Swamy, P.A.V.B., Artur Kennickell, and Peter von zur Muehlen (1990),"Comparing forecasts from fixed and variable coefficient models: the case of money demand," International Journal of Forecasting 6 (4) (December): 469-477.
- Swamy, P.A.V.B, Mehta, Jatinder S., von zur Muehlen, Peter, and George S. Tavlas (1991), "Some Problems with Identification in Parametric Models and their Solutions," Greek Economic Review 13, Number 2:287-312, url =https://www.researchgate.net/publication/5035269
- Swamy, P.A.V.B and George S. Tavlas (1995) "Random Coefficient Models: Theory and Applications," Journal of Economic Surveys 9, Number 2 (June): 165-196, doi=10.1111/j.1467-6419.1995.tb00113.x
- Christou, Costas, Swamy, P.A.V.B, and George S. Tavlas, (1996) "Modelling Optimal Strategies for the Allocation of Wealth in Multicurency investments," International Journal of Forecasting 12, Issue 4 (December):483-493
- Christou, Costas, Swamy, P.A.V.B., and George S. Tavlas (1998) “A Generalized Framework for Predicting Returns in Multicurrency Investments.” Journal of Economic Dynamics and Control 22, issue 7 (July): 977-1000.
- Swamy, P.A.V.B. and George S. Tavlas (2001) "Random Coefficient Models," A Companion to Theoretical Econometrics Badi H. Baltagi ed., Blackwell, Malden, MA:410-428, ISBN 9780631212546.
- Brissimis, Sophocles N., George Hondroyiannis, P. A. V. B. Swamy, George S. Tavlas (2003), "Empirical Modelling of Money Demand in Periods of Structural Change: The Case of Greece." Oxford Bulletin of Economics and Statistics 65, Issue 5 (December):605-625. https://onlinelibrary.wiley.com/doi/abs/10.1111/j.1468-0084.2003.00064.x
- Swamy, P.A.V.B and George S. Tavlas (2005) "Theoretical Conditions Under Which Monetary Policies are Effective and Practical to Their Verification," Economic Theory 25 (June): 999-1005, https://link.springer.com/article/10.1007/s00199-004-0482-8
- Hondroyiannis, George, PAVB Swamy, and George S Tavlas (2007) "The Time-varying Performance of the Long-run Demand for Money in the United States," Economic Inquiry 39 Issue 1 (March):111-123, https://doi.org/10.1111/j.1465-7295.2001.tb00054.x
- Swamy, P.A.V.B. and George S. Tavlas (2007) “The New Keynesian Phillips Curve and Inflation Expectations: Re-specification and Interpretation.” Economic Theory 31, issue 2 (May): 293-306.
- Hondroyiannis, George, PAVB Swamy, George Tavlas, Michael Ulan, (2008) "Some Further Evidence on Exchange Rate Volatility and Exports," Review of World Economics 144 (April):151-180
- Swamy, P.A.V.B, Tavlas, George S., Hall, Stephen, and George Hondroyiannis, (2010) "Exchange-rate volatility and export performance: Do emerging market economies resemble industrial countries or other developing countries?" Economic Modeling 27, Number 6 (November):1514-1521 ( https://doi.org/10.1016/j.econmod.2010.01.014)
- Hall, Stephen G, Amangeldi Kenjegaliev, PAVB Swamy, and George S Tavlas (2013) "The Forward Rate Premium Puzzle: a Case of Misspecification?" Studies in Nonlinear Dynamics and Econometrics17, Issue 3:265-279, https://doi.org/10.1515/snde-2013-0009, https://www.degruyter.com/document/doi/10.1515/snde-2013-0009/html
- Swamy, P.A.V.B, Mehta J.S, Tavlas George S., and Stephen G. Hall (2013) "Small Area Estimation with Correctly Specified Linking Models," Recent Advances in Estimating Nonlinear Models (January): 193-228, Springer Publishing, https://link.springer.com/chapter/10.1007/978-1-4614-8060-0_10
- Swamy, P.A.V.B, Mehta Jatinder S., Tavlas, George S. and Stepehn G. Hall (2015) "Two Applications of the Random Coefficient Procedure: Correcting for misspecifications in a small area level model and resolving Simpson's Paradox" Economic Modelling 45 (February): 93-98 (https://doi.org/10.1016/j.econmod.2014.10.053)
- Swamy, P.A.V.B and Peter von zur Muehlen, (2020) "Cointegration: Its Fatal Flaw and a Proposed Solution," Sustainable Futures 2 (January), https://doi.org/10.1016/j.sftr.2020.100038
- Swamy, P.A.V.B, von zur Muehlen, Peter, and I-Lok Chang (2021), "Coping with unobservables in estimating production functions: An example with US banking data," Sustainable Futures 3, doi=10.1016/j.sftr.2021.100058
