= Bureau of International Labor Affairs =

U.S. Labor Department's division for international affairs

United States Bureau of International Labor Affairs

Bureau overview
- Formed: October 10, 1947
- Headquarters: Frances Perkins Building
- Annual budget: $83 million (2009)
- Bureau executives: Thea Lee, Deputy Undersecretary for International Affairs; Mark Mittelhauser, Molly McCoy, Associate Deputy Undersecretaries for International Affairs
- Parent Bureau: United States Department of Labor
- Website: https://www.dol.gov/agencies/ilab

The Bureau of International Labor Affairs (ILAB) is an operating unit of the United States Department of Labor which manages the department's international responsibilities. According to its mission statement:

“The Bureau of International Labor Affairs leads the U.S. Department of Labor's efforts to ensure that workers around the world are treated fairly and are able to share in the benefits of the global economy. ILAB's mission is to improve global working conditions, raise living standards, protect workers' ability to exercise their rights, and address the workplace exploitation of children and other vulnerable populations. Our efforts help to ensure a fair playing field for American workers and contribute to stronger export markets for goods made in the United States.”

ILAB promotes the economic security and stability of United States workers in international affairs and provides advice and statistics on policy decisions which have U.S. labor concerns. The Bureau also represents the United States at trade negotiations and at international bodies like the International Labour Organization (ILO), the World Trade Organization (WTO), and the Organisation for Economic Co-operation and Development (OECD). It also provides technical assistance to foreign countries in the interest of benefiting the United States and additionally works with other government agencies to combat child labor and human trafficking abroad and in the United States.

The Bureau of International Labor Affairs is located in the Frances Perkins Building, Room S-2235, 200 Constitution Avenue, NW Washington, DC 20210. It is currently under the direction of Deputy Undersecretary for International Affairs Thea Lee.

== History ==
The Bureau of International Labor Affairs was formed October 10, 1947, during the administration of President Harry S. Truman under the direction of Lewis B. Schwellenbach as a means to formally institutionalize the international directives of the Department of Labor. Since its creation, ILAB has helped pass the Trade Agreements Act of 1979, aided the introduction of the United States of America into the International Labour Organization (ILO), and administered the North American Agreement on Labor Cooperation (NAALC), the portion of the North American Free Trade Agreement (NAFTA) which dealt with trade relations and required the establishment of a department in each member state to provide information about labor conditions in that country.

== Child labor, human trafficking and forced labor ==
In 1993, the United States Congress directed the Secretary of Labor, Robert Reich at the time, to identify foreign industries and countries which export goods to the United States which were produced using child labor. Responsibility for this project was given to ILAB which published the first of its reports on the subject: The Sweat and Toil of Children: The Use of Child Labor in American Imports.

In 1999, President Bill Clinton signed Executive Order 13126 which prohibited the purchase of items which were produced by forced or indentured labor. It also authorized the Department of Labor to compile a list of items and their respective countries which would be banned. This fell under the purview of the Bureau of International Labor Affairs. The current list, as compiled by ILAB, consists of 31 products including bamboo, beans, cocoa, coffee, nuts, rice, rubber, shrimp, and sugarcane. The products come from countries such as Afghanistan, Argentina, Benin, Bolivia, Burkina Faso, Burma, China, Colombia, Congo, Ethiopia, Ghana, India, Ivory Coast, Mali, Nepal, Nigeria, Pakistan, Russia, Sierra Leone, Tajikistan, Thailand and Uzbekistan. As of 2004, ILAB has spent more than $250 million to combat child labor since 1995.

On April 10, 2009, the Bureau of International Labor Affairs announced a letter of intent to "Fund International Child Labor Elimination Projects in Fiscal Year 2009" this involves the awarding of merit-based "cooperative agreement awards" to organizations seeking to fund projects to combat child labor through education. It is intended that $20 million be budgeted for this purpose. These efforts will be focused in the countries of Guatemala, Indonesia, Nepal, and Rwanda.

== International technical cooperation ==
ILAB provides technical assistance with other countries in the areas of technical expertise, worker health, and working conditions with the goal of benefiting U.S. foreign policy. This program began in the aftermath of World War II when the Department of Labor taught German trade unionists to assist in European reconstruction efforts.

In 1975, ILAB worked with the Government of Saudi Arabia to develop a vocational training program and in 1989, after the passage of the Support for Eastern European Democracy Act (SEED), ILAB aided economies that were transitioning to a more open economic system to develop labor markets. Additionally, ILAB has undertaken various social initiatives globally including a $10 million project to combat the spread of HIV/AIDS in workers. These initiatives are all aimed at providing stability to an interconnected global economy in which labor issues in foreign countries can have negative effects in the United States.

== Offices ==
- Office of the Deputy Under Secretary for International Affairs (ODUS)
- Office of Child Labor, Forced Labor, and Human Trafficking (OCFT)
  - Research and Policy Division
  - Monitoring and Evaluation Division
  - Asia/Europe/MENA Division
  - Latin America and the Caribbean Division
  - Africa Division
- Office of Trade and Labor Affairs (OTLA)
  - Trade Policy and Negotiations Division (TPN)
  - Monitoring and Enforcement of Trade Agreements Division (META)
  - Technical Assistance and Cooperation Division (TAC)
- Office of International Relations (OIR)
  - Multilateral and Global Issues Division
- Office of Economic and Labor Research (OELR)

== Related legislation ==
- Executive Order 13126
- Food, Conservation, and Energy Act of 2008 (“Farm Bill”)
- Trafficking Victims Protection Reauthorization Act (TVPRA)

== See also ==
- United States Department of Labor
- United States Department of State
- Harkin–Engel Protocol
- Child labor
- Children in cocoa production
