= Crunchyroll (disambiguation) =

Crunchyroll is an American subscription video-on-demand streaming service.

Crunchyroll may also refer to:

== Companies ==
- Crunchyroll, LLC, an American entertainment company owned by Sony since 2017
- Crunchyroll EMEA, formerly known as Viz Media Europe, a European anime distribution company owned by Crunchyroll, LLC
  - Crunchyroll SAS, formerly known as Viz Media Europe, the French subsidiary of Crunchyroll, LLC, part of Crunchyroll EMEA
  - Crunchyroll SA, formerly known as Viz Media Switzerland, the Swiss subsidiary of Crunchyroll, LLC, part of Crunchyroll EMEA
    - Crunchyroll GmbH, formerly known as AV Visionen GmbH, the German subsidiary of Crunchyroll SA, part of Crunchyroll EMEA
- Crunchyroll UK and Ireland (officially Crunchyroll Ltd and previously called Island World Communications and then Manga Entertainment Ltd.), the former subsidiary in the British Isles, an anime distributor and licensor
- Crunchyroll Store Australia (officially Crunchyroll Pty. Ltd., and previously known as Madman Anime), an Australian distribution company previously owned by Madman Entertainment and now owned by Crunchyroll, LLC

== Events ==
- Crunchyroll Expo, an annual anime convention held in San Jose, California
- Crunchyroll Expo Australia, formerly the Madman Anime Festival until a 2022 rebranding as Crunchyroll Expo

== Publications ==
- Crunchyroll Manga, a digital manga anthology published by Crunchyroll, LLC

== See also ==
- Crunchyroll Anime Awards
- Crunch (disambiguation)
- Roll (disambiguation)
