= Jared Bernstein =

American government official (born 1955)

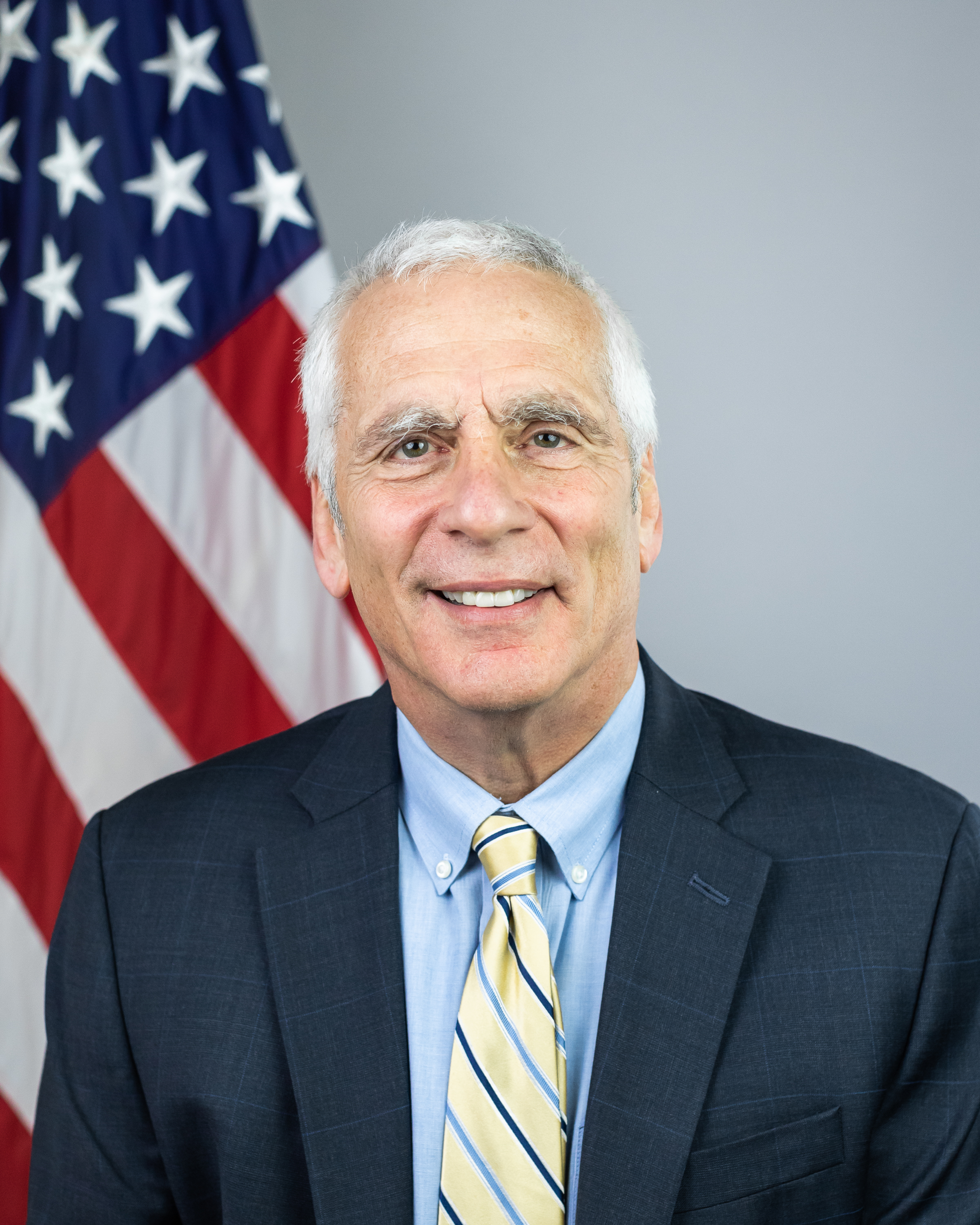
- Official portrait, 2021

31st Chair of the Council of Economic Advisers
- In office July 10, 2023 – January 20, 2025
- President: Joe Biden
- Preceded by: Cecilia Rouse
- Succeeded by: Stephen Miran

Member of the Council of Economic Advisers
- In office January 20, 2021 – July 10, 2023
- President: Joe Biden
- Preceded by: Tomas J. Philipson
- Succeeded by: Kirabo Jackson

Personal details
- Born: December 26, 1955 (age 70) New Haven, Connecticut, United States
- Party: Democratic
- Education: Manhattan School of Music (BM); Hunter College (MSW); Columbia University (DSW)

Jared Bernstein (born December 26, 1955) is an American economist and government official, who was the chair of the United States Council of Economic Advisers from July 2023 until the end of the Presidency of Joe Biden.

From 2009 to 2011, Bernstein was chief economist and economic adviser to Vice President Joe Biden in the Obama administration. Bernstein was a senior fellow at the Center on Budget and Policy Priorities.

In February 2023, President Joe Biden nominated Bernstein to serve as Chair of the Council of Economic Advisers. He was confirmed to be chair on June 13, 2023. He was ceremonially sworn in by Vice President Kamala Harris on July 10, 2023.

== Early life and education ==
Bernstein grew up in a musical family wanting to be a musician, starting a band with friends. Bernstein graduated with a bachelor's degree in music from the Manhattan School of Music where his first double bass teacher was Orin O'Brien. Throughout the '80s, Bernstein was a mainstay on the jazz scene in New York City. He is of Jewish descent.

He also earned a Master of Social Work from Hunter College as well as a Doctor of Social Work in social welfare from Columbia University's school of social work in 1994. At Columbia, his dissertation advisor was Irwin Garfinkel.

== Career ==
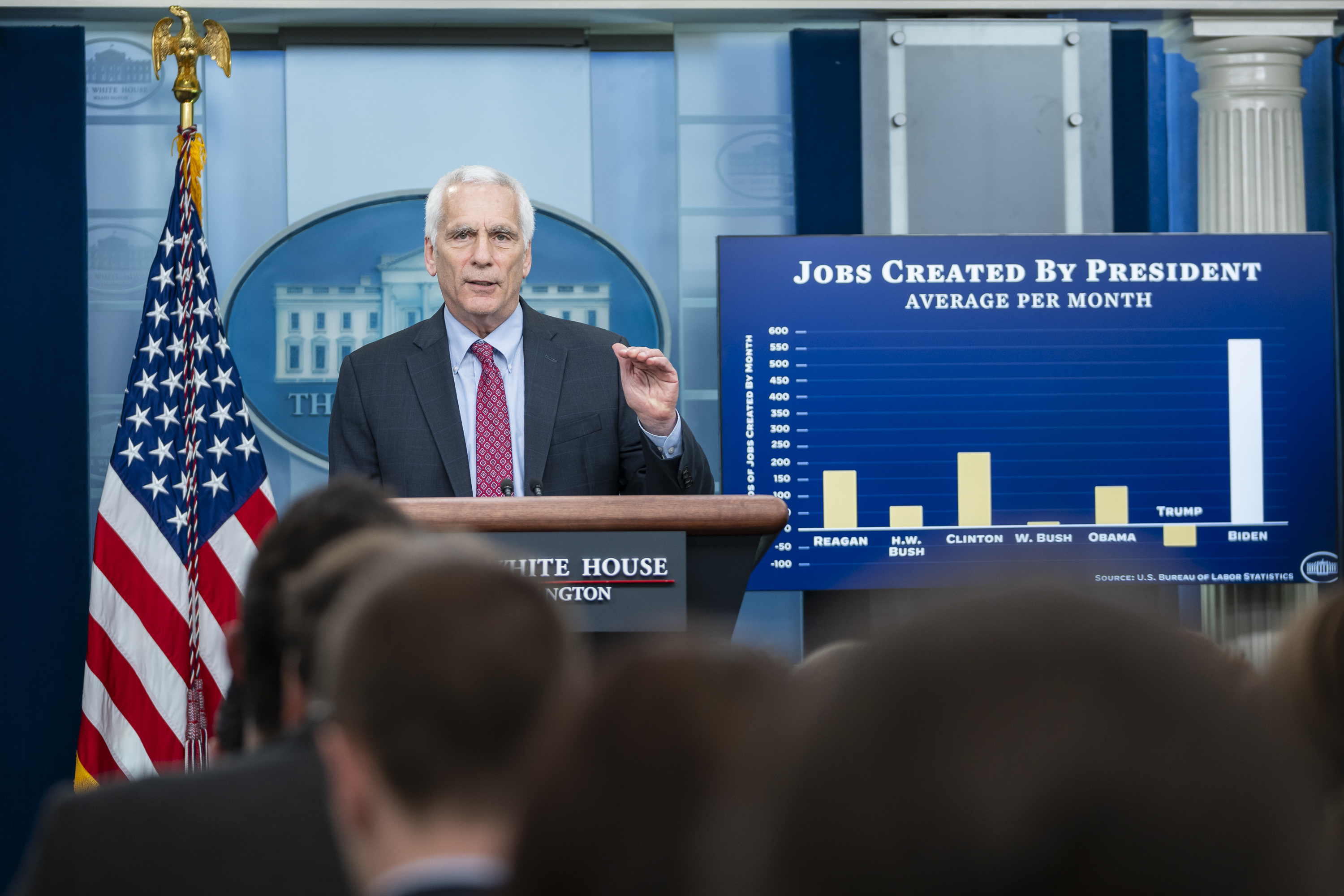
Bernstein in the James S. Brady Press Briefing Room of the White House on April 1, 2022

Bernstein has taught at Howard University, Columbia University, and New York University.

Bernstein "is an expert in the areas of federal, state, and international economic policies, specifically the middle-class squeeze, income inequality and mobility, trends in employment and earnings, low-wage labor markets, poverty, and international comparisons."

He is known as a critic of free trade agreements such as the North American Free Trade Agreement (NAFTA).

In 1992, Bernstein started working as a senior official at the Economic Policy Institute (EPI), a liberal think tank with a focus on issues affecting low- and middle-income working people. From 1995 to 1996, he served in the United States Department of Labor as deputy chief economist. He then returned to the EPI, as senior economist and director of the Living Standards Program, until he was selected by Biden. His designated job on the vice presidential staff is a new position, created because of "the critical nature of the economic challenges facing America." Upon his appointment, some journalists claimed that it "contrasts sharply with the more centrist views of many of president-elect Barack Obama's economic advisers."

Bernstein sits on the Congressional Budget Office's advisory committee. He is a contributor at the financial news network CNBC. He also was appointed executive director of the Middle Class Working Families Task Force and is responsible for direct management of the project.

Paul Krugman, a Nobel laureate in economics and a noted progressive columnist, argued in November 2008 that the centrist makeup of President Barack Obama's economic inner circle, the new Economic Recovery Advisory Board, could be used to "give progressive economists a voice," and he mentioned Bernstein and fellow EPI economist president Lawrence Mishel among others as progressive economists who might be suitable for the board.

=== Biden administration ===
On September 5, 2020, Bernstein became a member of the advisory council of the Biden-Harris Transition Team, which was planning the presidential transition of Joe Biden. Subsequently, President Joe Biden selected Bernstein to serve on the Council of Economic Advisers in January 2021.

In February 2023, Bernstein was nominated as Chair of the Council of Economic Advisers by President Biden, replacing Cecilia Rouse.

On May 11, 2023, the United States Senate Committee on Banking, Housing, and Urban Affairs advanced Bernstein's nomination by a 12–11 vote. On June 13, 2023, the United States Senate invoked cloture on Bernstein's nomination by a 50–49 vote. He was confirmed later that day by a 50–49 vote.

== Publications ==
Bernstein's books include All Together Now: Common Sense for a Fair Economy and Crunch: Why Do I Feel So Squeezed? (And Other Unsolved Economic Mysteries). He coauthored the last nine editions of The State of Working America, an ongoing analysis published since 1988 by the Economic Policy Institute, as well as coauthoring The Benefits of Full Employment: When Markets Work for People, where he states that "[l]ow unemployment by itself cannot address all the inequities in society," and advocates that "[o]ther forms of intervention are still needed to assist disadvantaged populations."

He is a regular columnist for The American Prospect online, a contributor to the CNBC financial news television network, and an op-ed writer in the New York Times and the Washington Post. He has also written Diary entries on the Daily Kos website.

Political offices
Preceded by Cecilia Rouse	Chair of the Council of Economic Advisers; 2023–2025	Succeeded by Stephen Miran
