= All Together Now =

All Together Now may refer to:

== Films ==
- All Together Now (1986 film), a British television film by Peter Buckman in the anthology series ScreenPlay
- All Together Now (2008 film), a film following the creation of The Beatles LOVE by Cirque du Soleil
- All Together Now (2020 film), a teen film starring Auli'i Cravalho

== Music ==
- "All Together Now" (Beatles song), a song by The Beatles from their album Yellow Submarine
- "All Together Now" (The Farm song)
- All Together Now (Argent album)
- All Together Now (Better Than Ezra album)
- All Together Now (festival)
- "All Together Now", a song by Alabama from the Sesame Street film soundtrack: Follow That Bird

== Television ==
- All Together Now (1991 Australian TV series), an Australian comedy series (1991–1993)
- All Together Now (Philippine TV series), a 2003 Philippine comedy series
- All Together Now (franchise), a reality singing competition format created in the UK
  - All Together Now (British TV series), a UK talent series launched in 2018
  - All Together Now (2018 Australian TV series), the Australian version
  - All Together Now (Italian TV series), the Italian version, 2019–2020
  - Śpiewajmy razem. All Together Now, the Polish version, 2018–2019
- "All Together Now" (Masters of Sex), a 2013 episode

== Literature ==
- All Together Now (book), a book by Jared Bernstein

== Other uses ==
- All Together Now (nonprofit group), an Australian racial equality organization

== See also ==
- All Together (disambiguation)
- "Together Now", a 1998 single by Olivia Lufkin, Jean Michel Jarre & Tetsuya Komuro
