= Thea Lee =

American economist

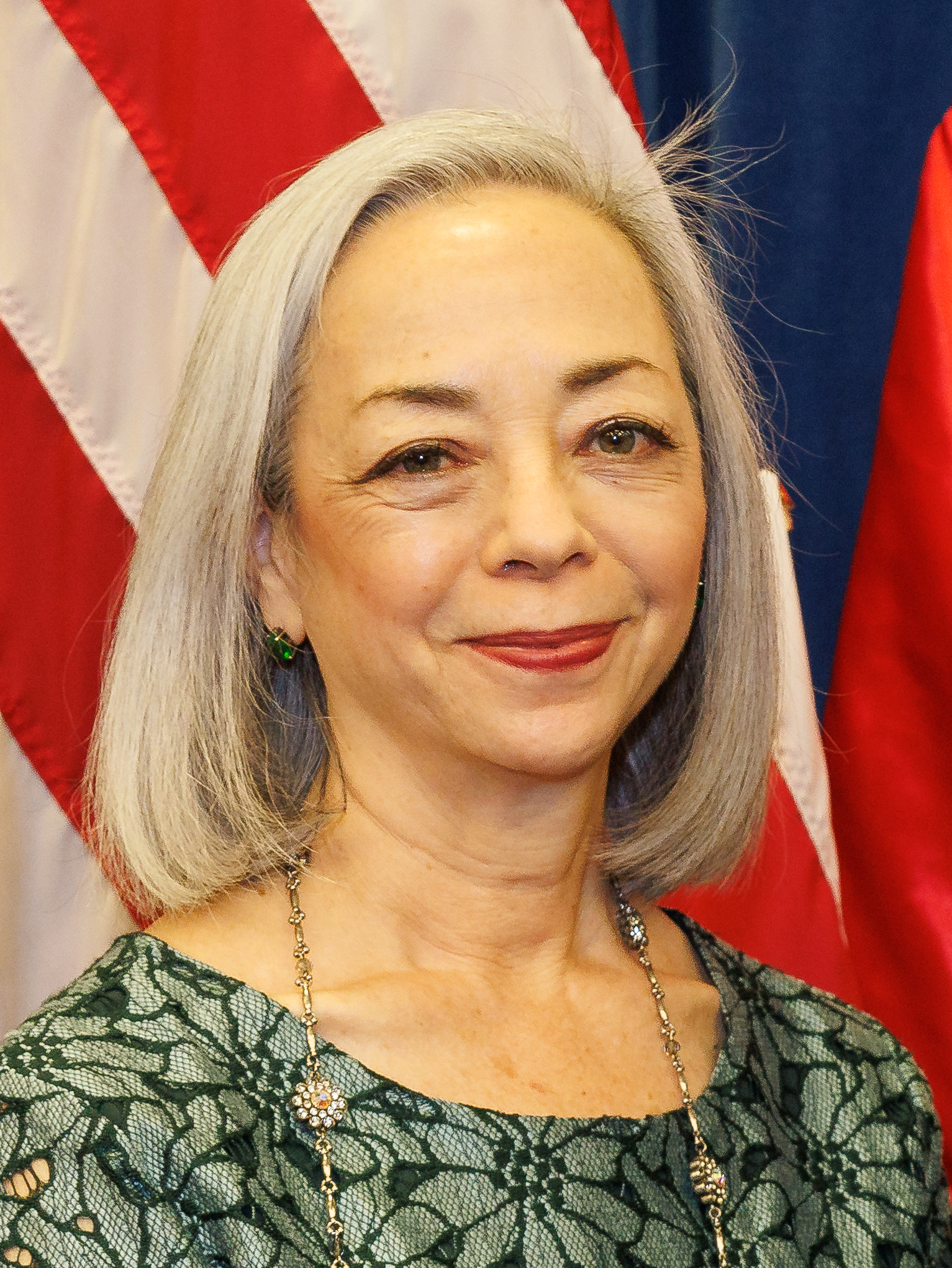

Deputy Undersecretary for International Labor Affairs
- In office 2021 – January 20, 2025
- President: Joe Biden
- Preceded by: Vacant

President of the Economic Policy Institute
- In office 2017–2021
- Preceded by: Lawrence Mishel
- Succeeded by: Heidi Shierholz

Personal details
- Children: 1
- Education: Smith College (BA); University of Michigan (MA)
- Profession: Economist

Thea Mei Lee is an American economist who served as the Deputy Undersecretary for International Labor Affairs at the Department of Labor from 2021 to 2025. She previously served as president of the Economic Policy Institute, a think tank based in Washington, D.C.

== Education ==
Lee completed her undergraduate degree in economics at Smith College in Northampton, Massachusetts where she graduated cum laude in 1980. She also holds a master's degree in economics from the University of Michigan.

== Career ==
Prior to being appointed to the Department of Labor, Lee began her career at the Economic Policy Institute as an international trade economist in the 1990s. She then worked as the chief international economist for the AFL-CIO from 1997 to 2017.

In 2017, Lee returned to the Economic Policy Institute as its president.

President Joe Biden appointed Lee as the Deputy Undersecretary for International Affairs at the Department of Labor on May 10, 2021.

At the Department of Labor, Lee focused on global labor protections, tackling issues from unsafe working conditions to child labor. A particular focus was enforcing labor rights cases under the United States-Mexico-Canada Agreement and implementing the Uyghur Forced Labor Prevention Act.

== Personal life ==
Lee is the descendant of a Chinese railroad worker on her father's side and Eastern European Jews escaping the Holocaust on her mother's side. She lives in Washington, DC with her husband and two dogs.
