= Arthur Goldberger =

American economist

Arthur S. Goldberger
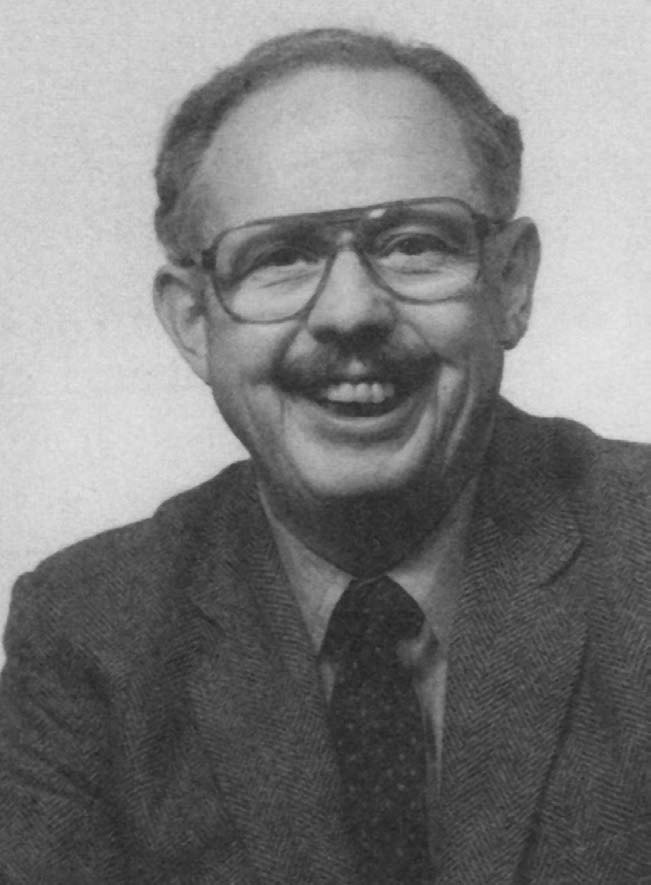
- Born: November 20, 1930; Brooklyn, New York, US
- Died: December 11, 2009 (aged 79); Madison, Wisconsin, US

Academic background
- Education: University of Michigan (PhD); NYU (B.S.)
- Doctoral advisor: Lawrence Klein

Academic work
- Discipline: Econometrics
- School or tradition: Neoclassical economics
- Institutions: University of Wisconsin–Madison
- Doctoral students: P. A. V. B. Swamy
- Website: Information at IDEAS / RePEc

Arthur Stanley Goldberger (November 20, 1930 – December 11, 2009) was an econometrician and an economist. He worked with Nobel Prize winner Lawrence Klein on the development of the Klein–Goldberger macroeconomic model at the University of Michigan.

He spent most of his career at the University of Wisconsin–Madison, where he helped build the Department of Economics. He wrote classic graduate and undergraduate econometrics textbooks, including Econometric Theory (1964), A Course in Econometrics (1991) and Introductory Econometrics (1998). Among his many accomplishments, he published a number of articles critically evaluating the literature on the heritability of IQ and other behavioral traits.

In 1968 he was elected as a Fellow of the American Statistical Association.

== Selected publications ==
- (1964) Goldberger and Lawrence Klein. Econometric Model of the U. S., Nineteen Twenty-Nine to Nineteen Fifty-Two.
- (1964) Goldberger. Econometric Theory (Wiley Publications in Applied Statistics) .John Wiley & Sons Inc.. ISBN 978-0471311010.
- (1970) Goldberger. Impact Multipliers and Dynamic Properties of the Klein-Goldberger Model (Contributions to Economic Analysis). North-Holland Publishing Company. ISBN 978-0720431124.
- (1981) Goldberger. A Course in Econometrics. Harvard University Press. ISBN 978-0674175440.

== Sources ==
- Jöreskog, K. G. and Goldberger, A. S. (1975). "Estimation of a model with multiple indicators and multiple causes of a single latent variable". Journal of the American Statistical Association. 70 (351): 631–639. doi:10.2307/2285946. JSTOR 2285946.
