= Lester Thurow =

American economist (1938–2016)

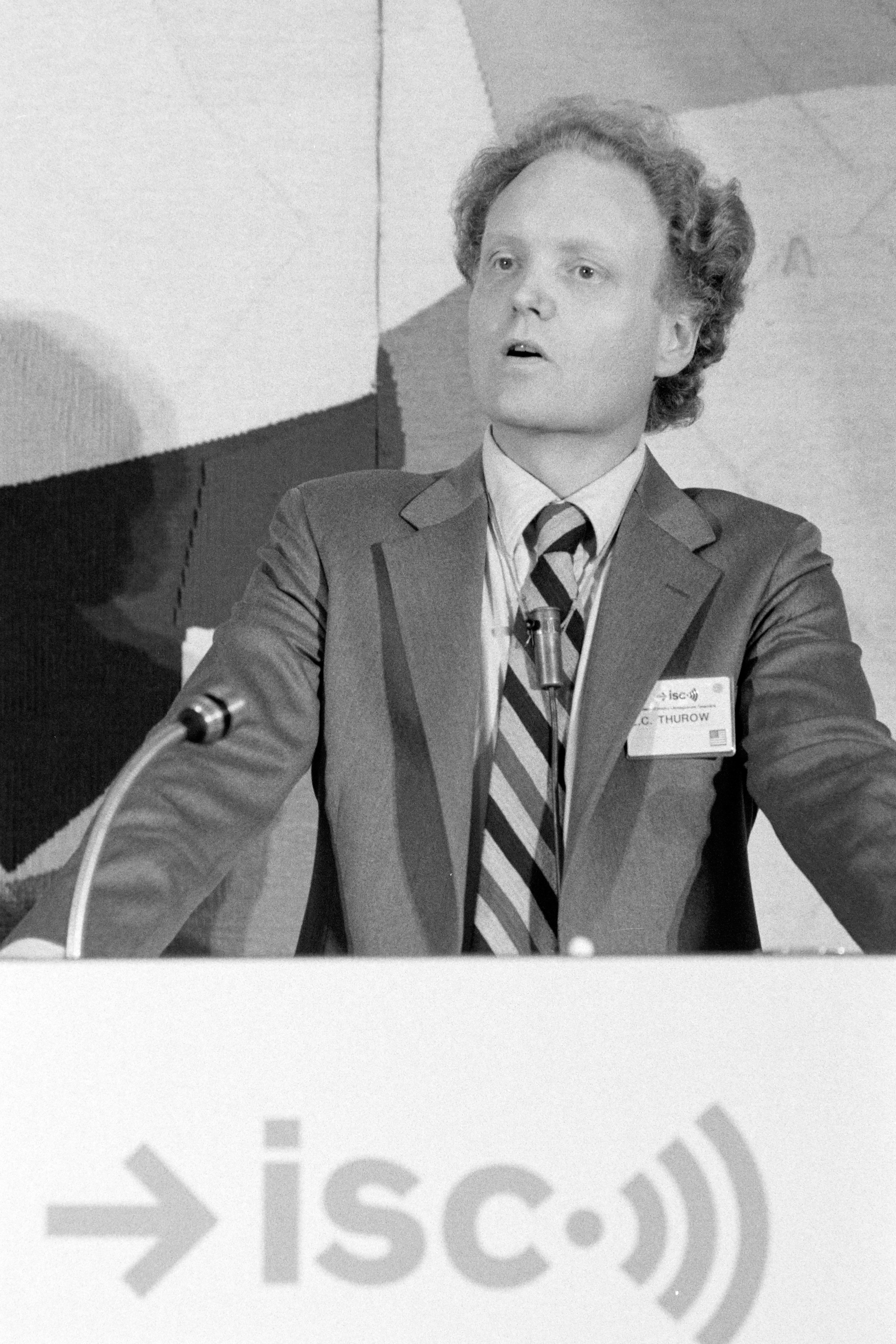
Image of Lester C. Thurow

Lester Carl Thurow (May 7, 1938 – March 25, 2016) was an American political economist, former dean of the MIT Sloan School of Management, and author of books on economic topics.

== Education ==
Born in Livingston, Montana, Thurow received his B.A. in political economy from Williams College in 1960, where he was in Theta Delta Chi and Phi Beta Kappa as a junior, and a Tyng Scholar. After he was awarded a Rhodes Scholarship, he went to Balliol College, Oxford to read Philosophy, Politics and Economics, graduating in 1962 with first class honors. He received a Ph.D. in Economics from Harvard University in 1964.

== Career ==
Thurow was on the board of directors of Analog Devices, Grupo Casa Autrey, E-Trade, and Taiwan Semiconductor Manufacturing Corp (TSMC). Thurow was one of the founders of the Economic Policy Institute in 1986. Thurow was an economics columnist for, among others, the Boston Globe and USA Today. He was an economics columnist for and on the editorial board of the New York Times, and was a contributing editor to Newsweek, where he earned the 1982 Gerald Loeb Award for Columns/Editorials.

Thurow was a longtime advocate of a political and economic system of the Japanese and European type, in which governmental involvement in the direction of the economy is far more extensive than is the case in the United States – a model that has come to be known as "Third Way" philosophy. Thurow supported a more universal patent system as a requirement for a knowledge-based economy, where governments would assess the value of infringements of intellectual property against their companies by competitors in foreign jurisdictions and allow these companies to match that.

Thurow died at the age of 77 on March 25, 2016.

== Books ==
External videos
- Booknotes interview with Thurow on Head to Head: The Coming Economic Battle Among Japan, Europe, and America, May 31, 1992, C-SPAN
- Washington Journal interview with Thurow on Fortune Favors the Bold, October 8, 2003, C-SPAN

His 1993 book, Head to Head: The Coming Economic Battle Among Japan, Europe and America compares economic growth and living standards in Japan, Europe, and the U.S. His other books include:

- Fortune Favors the Bold: What we must do to build a new and lasting global prosperity (2003).
- Building Wealth: The new rules (1999).
- The Future of Capitalism: How today's economic forces shape tomorrow's world (1996).
- The Zero-Sum Solution: Building a world-class American economy (1985).
- Dangerous Currents: The state of economics (1983).
- The Zero-Sum Society: Distribution and the possibilities for economic change (1980) ISBN 0465085881.
- Generating Inequality: Mechanisms of distribution in the U.S. economy (1975).
