= James Ball (economist) =

English economist (1933–2018)

Sir James Ball CBE
- Born: 15 July 1933
- Died: 15 January 2018 (aged 84)

Academic background
- Education: University of Pennsylvania (PhD); Oxford University (MA)

Academic work
- Discipline: Macroeconomics
- Institutions: London Business School

Sir Robert James Ball CBE (15 July 1933 – 15 January 2018) was an English economist, a principal of the London Business School (LBS) in 1972–1984 and a leader in the field of econometric modelling.

== Work ==
Ball was co-creator with Lawrence Klein of the Oxford Econometric Model, which led to an "explosion" of macroeconometric forecasting. He was a senior lecturer at Manchester University and Terry Burns was his research assistant.

== Other positions ==
Ball joined the LBS in 1964 as a professor of economics after recruitment by Harold Rose, emeritus professor of finance. According to the LBS Professor of Management Practice in Accounting, Sir Andrew Likierman, Ball's presence as the "king of forecasting" there greatly changed the reputation of business schools in the UK in the 1970s. Ball also launched the country's first Executive MBA program of its kind in 1982 and fund-raised for the development of the Plowden building at the LBS London Campus.

Ball was a director of IBM UK from 1992 to 1995, and of IBM UK Pensions Trust from 1993 to 2003.

Ball was a trustee of The Economist newspaper. He also served on the Board of Governors of the Centre for Economic Policy Research, and as the Chairman of Legal & General Group in 1979–1994.

== Honours and awards ==
In June 1984 Ball was awarded a knighthood in the Queen's Birthday Honours. In 1994, the book Money, Inflation and Employment: Essays in Honour of James Ball was published to mark his contribution to the field of econometric modelling.

Ball died on 15 January 2018, aged 84.
