= All Together =

All Together may refer to:

== Arts and media ==
=== Film and television ===
- All Together (1942 film), a 1942 cartoon promoting war bonds
- All Together (2011 film), a 2011 French film
- All Together (professional wrestling), professional wrestling events

=== Music ===
- "All Together", song by Alain Johannes 1991
- "All Together", song from Ascend (Illenium album)

== Political organizations ==
- All Together (South Korea), a political organization in South Korea
- All Together (Serbia), a political organization in Serbia
- All Together (Kazakhstan), a political party in Kazakhstan

== See also ==
- All Together Now (disambiguation)
