= Economic Policy Institute =

American public policy think tank

- Formation: October 1, 1986; 40 years ago
- Founder: Jeff Faux, Lester Thurow, Ray Marshall, Barry Bluestone, Robert Reich, Robert Kuttner
- Type: Public policy think tank
- Tax ID no.: 52-1368964
- Location(s): 1225 I Street NW; Washington, D.C., U.S.
- Coordinates: 38.901627°N 77.029256°W
- President: Heidi Shierholz
- Revenue: $11.9 million (2024)
- Expenses: $13.6 million (2024)
- Website: www.epi.org

The Economic Policy Institute (EPI) is a 501(c)(3) non-profit think tank based in Washington, D.C., that carries out economic research and analyzes the economic impact of policies and proposals. Affiliated with the labor movement, the EPI is usually described as presenting a left-wing and pro-union viewpoint on public policy issues. Since 2021, EPI has been led by economist Heidi Shierholz, the former chief economist of the Department of Labor.

EPI has an advocacy arm, EPI Action, which is a 501(c)(4) group.

== History ==
EPI was founded on October 1, 1986, by economists Jeff Faux, Lester Thurow, Ray Marshall, Barry Bluestone, Robert Reich, and Robert Kuttner. Since 2021, Heidi Shierholz has served as its president. Shierholz succeeded Thea Lee, who was named Deputy Undersecretary for International Affairs at the Department of Labor by President Joe Biden.

== Policy proposals ==
EPI supported Bernie Sanders's Medicare for All proposal. In a March 2020 policy paper, it argued that the loss of jobs in the insurance industry and in administering the current system would be small, within the normal job churn, and easily absorbed by the economy. The paper argued that this cost would be outweighed by the benefits of universal health care and in small business formation. EPI has also released policy papers analyzing U.S. investment in early childhood education.

In July 2012, EPI and the AFL–CIO, Center for Community Change, Leadership Conference on Civil and Human Rights, National Council of La Raza and SEIU proposed a budget plan titled Prosperity Economics, a counter to the Republican Party's Path to Prosperity budget plan. The Prosperity Economics plan suggests that major public investment in areas like infrastructure is needed to jump-start the economy.

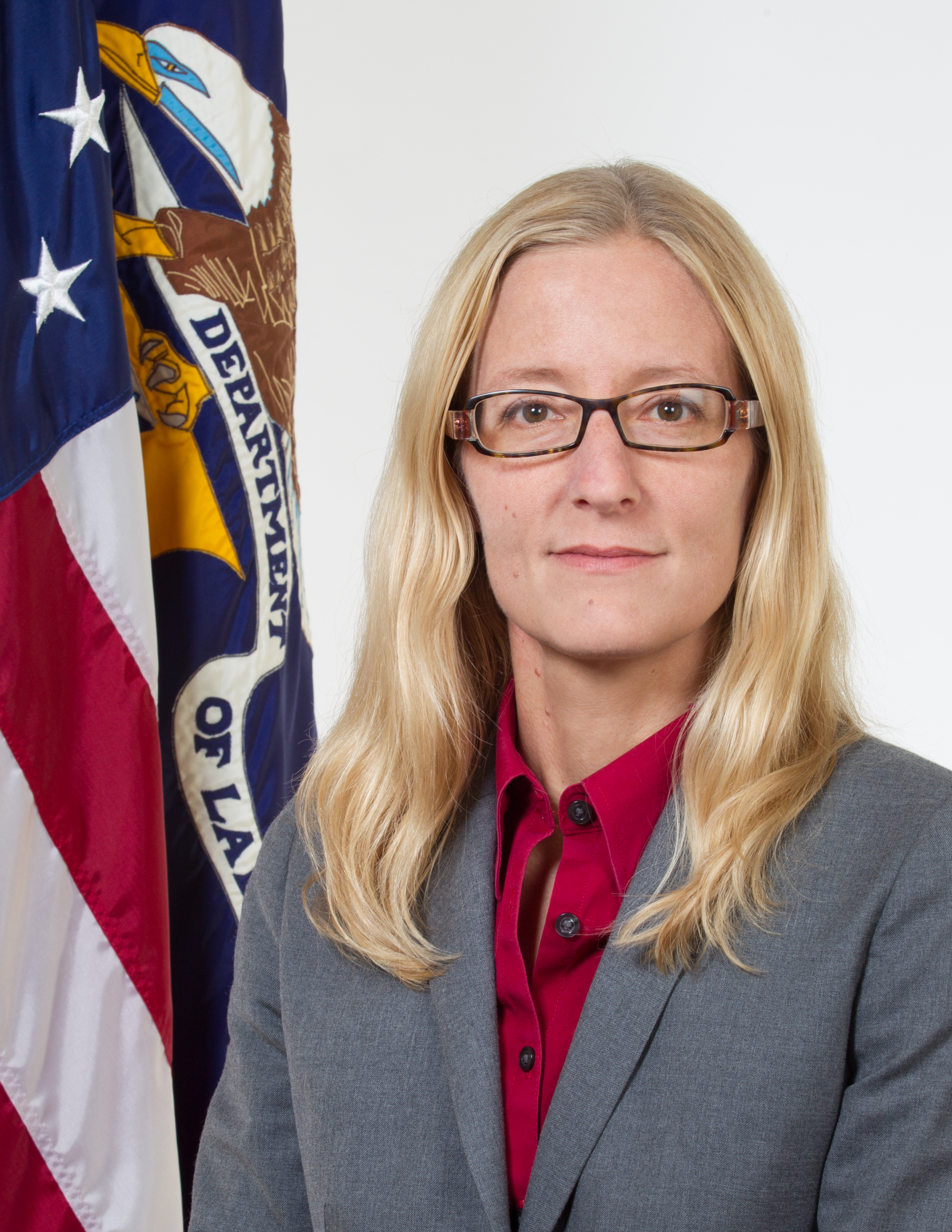
Heidi Shierholz, a former chief economist of the United States Department of Labor, has served as the EPI's president since 2021.

In response to the debate over the United States fiscal cliff, EPI economist Josh Bivens advocated raising tax rates for higher income earners, writing: "Given this rise in [income] inequality, it makes sense that much of the future burden of reducing budget deficits should be borne by those who have benefited the most from economic trends in recent decades."

== Funding ==
Eight labor unions made a five-year funding pledge to EPI at its inception: AFSCME, United Auto Workers, United Steelworkers, United Mine Workers, International Association of Machinists, Communications Workers of America, Service Employees International Union, and United Food and Commercial Workers Union. According to EPI, about 29% of its funding between 2005 and 2009 was supplied by labor unions and about 53% came from foundation grants.

In the 1980s, EPI took money from the Tobacco Institute, a now-defunct tobacco industry trade group, to oppose excise taxes on the tobacco industry's behalf. The Tobacco Institute worked with groups like EPI "to support the release of studies, editorials, press briefings, and testimony against regressive excise taxes" that would negatively impact the tobacco industry's bottom line if passed.
