= Stephen G. Hall =

British economist and academic (born 1953)

- Born: Stephen George Frederick Hall; 25 December 1953 (age 72); Bethnal Green, London, United Kingdom
- Education: London School of Economics (MS, 1978; PhD 1986); City University London (BS, 1977)
- Occupations: Economist, academic

Stephen George Frederick Hall (born 25 December 1953) is a British economist and academic. He is currently a professor in the economics department at the University of Leicester.

== Early life and education ==
Hall was born in London in 1953. He received his bachelor's degree from City University London in 1977, followed by a master's degree (1978) and doctorate (1986) from the London School of Economics. His thesis was Solving and Evaluating Large Non-Linear Econometric Models. He holds a doctorate of commerce honoris causa from the University of Pretoria, South Africa, where he is a visiting professor.

== Career ==
Formerly Senior research fellow at the national institute of economic and social research Economic advisor at the Bank of England Professorial research fellow at the London business school Preofessor at Imperial College

Currently professor at Leicester University

Past consultancies include The United Nations Desa The European central banks The International Monetary Fund The European Commission Numerous central banks

== Select publications ==
Hall was a co-editor of the journal Economic Modelling, the Central European Journal of Economic Modelling and Econometrics and Applied Financial Economics, "Economies" and "econometrics".

- Hall, Stephen G.; Asteriou, Dimitrios (2011). Applied Econometrics. New York: Palgrave Macmillan. ISBN 978-0-230-27182-1.
- Hall, Stephen G. (2004). Macroeconometric Models and European Monetary Union. Berlin: Duncker & Humblot. ISBN 978-3-428-11398-9.
- Hall, Stephen G.; Cuthbertson, Keith; Taylor, Mark P. (1992). Applied Econometric Techniques. New York: Simon & Schuster. ISBN 978-0-472-10328-7.
