= Oxford model =

Econometric model

The Oxford Model or the Oxford macro econometric Model was a Macroeconomic model created by Lawrence Klein and Sir James Ball. It included a Phillips-type relation and led to an "explosion" of macroeconometric forecasting.
