= Harkin–Engel Protocol =

2001 international cocoa labour agreement

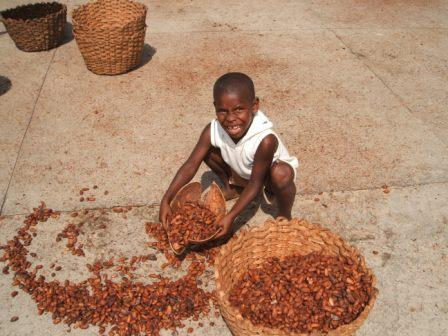
Boy collecting cocoa after beans have dried

The Harkin–Engel Protocol, (Note: The protocol is formally called "Protocol for the Growing and Processing of Cocoa Beans and Their Derivative Products in a Manner that Complies with ILO Convention 182 Concerning the Prohibition and Immediate Action for the Elimination of the Worst Forms of Child Labor.") sometimes referred to as the Cocoa Protocol, is an international agreement aimed at ending the worst forms of child labor (according to the International Labour Organization's Convention 182) and forced labor (according to ILO Convention 29) in the production of cocoa, the main ingredient in chocolate. The protocol was negotiated by U.S. Senator Tom Harkin and U.S. Representative Eliot Engel in response to a documentary and multiple articles in 2000 and 2001 reporting widespread child slavery and child trafficking in the production of cocoa. The protocol was signed in September 2001. Joint Statements in 2001, 2005 and 2008 and a Joint Declaration in 2010 extended the commitment to address the problem.

The industry's pledge to reduce child labor in Ivory Coast and Ghana by 70%, as per the Protocol, had not been met by late 2015; the deadline was again extended, to 2020.

== Background ==
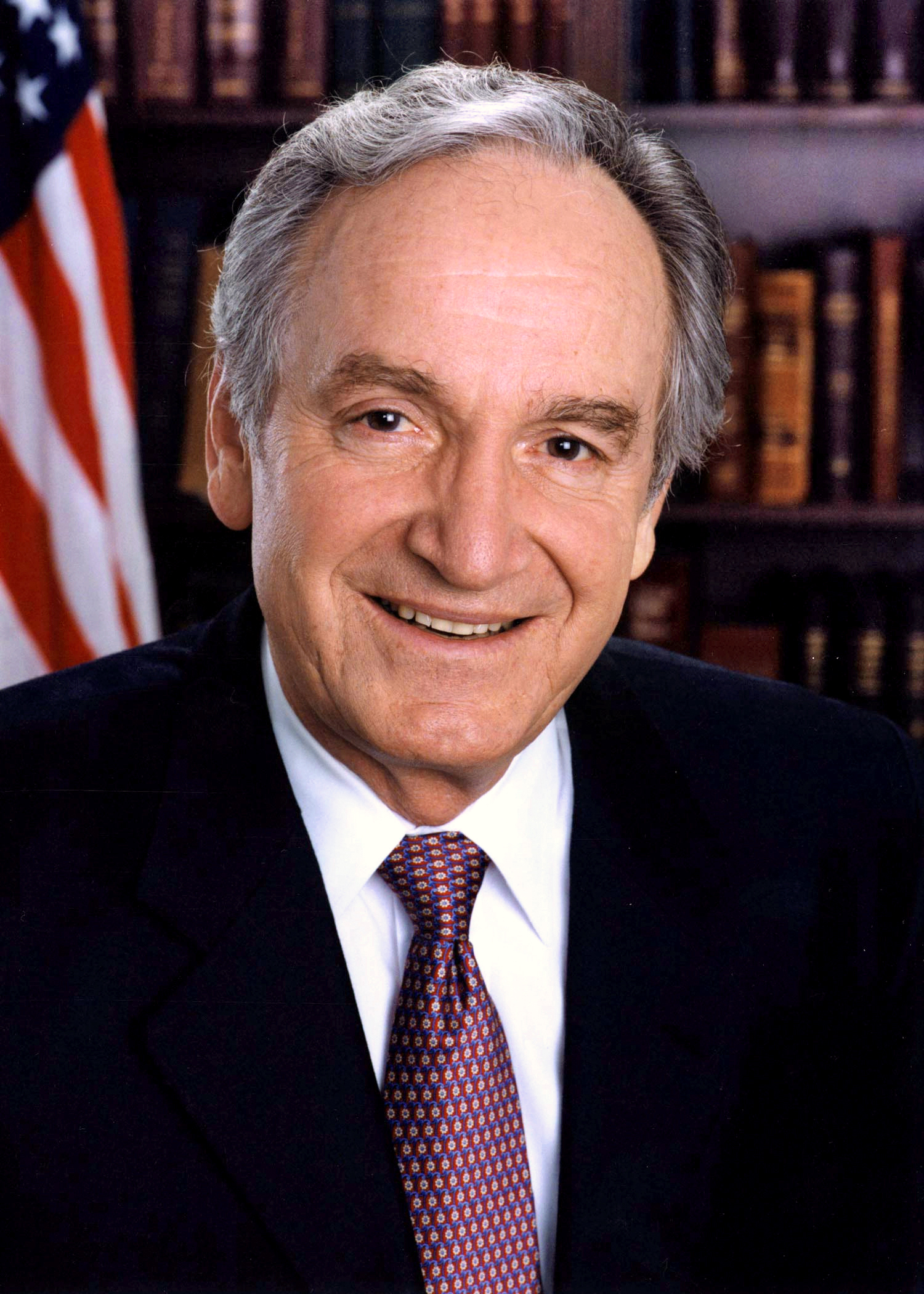
Sen. Tom Harkin

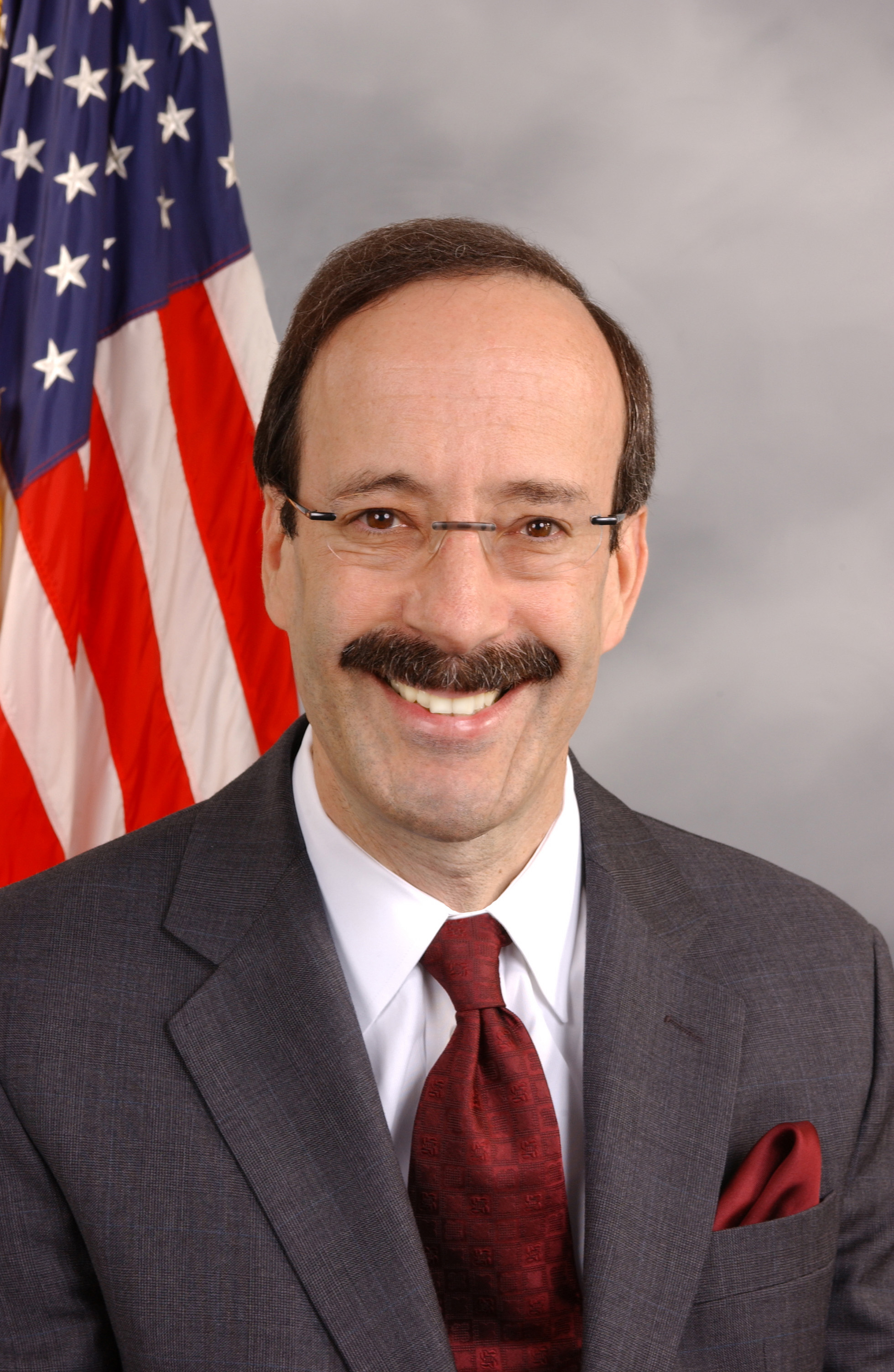
Rep. Eliot Engel

In late 2000 a BBC documentary reported the use of enslaved children in the production of cocoa—the main ingredient in chocolate— in West Africa. Other media followed by reporting widespread child slavery and child trafficking in the production of cocoa. The cocoa industry was accused of profiting from child slavery and trafficking. The European Cocoa Association dismissed these accusations as "false and excessive" and the industry said the reports were not representative of all areas. Later the industry acknowledged the working conditions for children were unsatisfactory and children's rights were sometimes violated and acknowledged the claims could not be ignored.

In 2001, US Representative Eliot Engel introduced a legislative amendment to an agriculture bill. This amendment was to give the U.S. Food and Drug Administration (FDA) $250,000 to develop a label to indicate no child slave labor was used in growing or harvesting cocoa; this label would be similar to the "dolphin safe" labels used for tuna. The amendment was approved in the House of Representatives vote of 291–115. (Note: It has also been reported that this vote was 107–76, but the final Payson report has the result as 291–115.) The bill appeared to have similar support in the Senate. The international cocoa industry strongly opposed it and the Chocolate Manufacturers Association hired former senators George Mitchell and Bob Dole to lobby against it. The cocoa industry faced potential consumer boycotts and harmful legislation if the bill were to pass. Mitchell and Dole encouraged the industry to make a deal, and before the bill went to a vote in the Senate, the cocoa industry agreed to address the problem without legislation.

Senator Tom Harkin and Engel negotiated a deal with the cocoa industry to create the Harkin–Engel Protocol. The protocol was signed in September 2001 with the objective to eliminate the "worst forms of child labor" and adult forced labor on cocoa farms in West Africa. It was signed and witnessed by the heads of eight major chocolate companies, Harkin, Engel, Senator Herb Kohl, the ambassador of Côte d'Ivoire, the director of the International Programme on the Elimination of Child Labor, and others.

== Protocol and 2001 Joint Statement ==
The Harkin–Engel Protocol is a voluntary public-private agreement to eliminate the worst forms of child labor (defined according to the International Labour Organization (ILO)'s Convention 182) in the growth and processing of cocoa in Côte d’Ivoire and Ghana. The protocol was a voluntary agreement that partnered governments, the global cocoa industry, cocoa producers, cocoa laborers, non-governmental organizations. The agreement laid out a series of date-specific actions, including the development of voluntary standards of public certification. The Protocol did not commit the industry to ending all child labor in cocoa production, only the worst forms of it. The parties agreed to a six-article plan:

1. Public statement of the need for and terms of an action plan—The cocoa industry acknowledged the problem of forced child labor and will commit "significant resources" to address the problem.
2. Formation of multi-sectoral advisory groups—By 1 October 2001, an advisory group will be formed to research labor practices. By 1 December 2001, industry will form an advisory group and formulate appropriate remedies to address the worst forms of child labor.
3. Signed joint statement on child labor to be witnessed at the ILO—By 1 December 2001, a statement must be made recognizing the need to end the worst forms of child labor and identify developmental alternatives for the children removed from labor.
4. Memorandum of cooperation—By 1 May 2002, Establish a joint action program of research, information exchange, and action to enforce standards to eliminate the worst forms of child labor. Establish a monitor and compliance with the standards.
5. Establish a joint foundation—By 1 July 2002, industry will form a foundation to oversee efforts to eliminate the worst forms of child labor. It will perform field projects and be a clearinghouse on best practices.
6. Building toward credible standards—By 1 July 2005, the industry will develop and implement industry-wide standards of public certification that cocoa has been grown without any of the worst forms of child labor.

A 2001 Joint Statement extended the protocol to also identify and eliminate forced labor (defined according to ILO Convention 29) in the production of cocoa.

The protocol laid out a non-binding agreement for the cocoa industry to regulate itself without any legal implications, but Engel threatened to reintroduce legislation if the deadlines were not met. This agreement was one of the first times an American industry was subjected to self-regulation and one of the first times self-regulation was used to address an international human rights issue.

== 2005 progress and Joint Statement ==
By July 2005—the deadline date—the cocoa industry made progress on their goal to eliminate the worst forms of child labor. Most of the requirements were achieved by the deadline. Before the protocol was signed, the cocoa industry acknowledged the problem of forced child labor to address part of Article 1. A Joint Statement was made in 2001 to address part of Article 3. The International Cocoa Initiative (ICI) was established in 2002 to address part of Article 5. Through the ICI, $3 million was spent on pilot projects. The International Institute of Tropical Agriculture (IITA) was assigned to survey West Africans about children in cocoa production. Pilot projects were formed to monitor child labor. In 2004, the cocoa industry created and funded Verification Working Group. The funding was discontinued in 2006, but another company was contracted to perform verification in 2007.

But all the protocol requirements were not met by the deadline. The cocoa industry failed to create and implement an industry-wide certification standard to indicate that cocoa had not been produced with the worst forms of child labor. The chocolate companies were criticized for executing the protocol at the smallest cost, remaining mostly hands-off in the process without changing the process, and maintaining a business model dependent on child labor. More importantly, they did not alter the price of chocolate to enable the cocoa producers to end the practice of slavery. One of the major obstacles to executing the protocol was the Ivorian Civil War. Along with diamonds and timber, cocoa was a conflict resource that made money for the militants.

By July 2005 the extent of child involvement in cocoa production was unclear. It was also unclear if the cocoa industry's efforts were helping the problem. On 1 July 2005, all the parties agreed to an extension of the protocol through a Joint Statement. The 2005 Joint Statement gave the cocoa industry three more years to implement the protocol. The Joint Statement stated industry would form a certification system for half of the growing regions in Côte d'Ivoire and Ghana. The Joint Statement also stated industry would support programs for the local cocoa-growing communities including teacher training programs.

The US Congress was not satisfied with the cocoa industry's response. It gave responsibility to the US Department of Labor to find a university contractor to oversee the efforts to eliminate the worst forms of child labor. In 2006, a $4.3 million contract was awarded to the Payson Center for International Development at Tulane University through 2009. In 2006, the Payson Center reported progress had been made, but children were still working in cocoa production, including performing dangerous tasks, and regularly miss school. The cocoa industry was criticized for a lack of certification standards and the governments of Côte d'Ivoire and Ghana were criticized for a lack of transparency. In 2006, the president of the World Cocoa Foundation said, "While progress has been made and we have learned valuable lessons, much more is required."

After the deadline passed, the International Labor Rights Fund filed a lawsuit in 2005 under the Alien Tort Claims Act against Nestlé, Cargill and Archer Daniels Midland on behalf of three Malian children. The suit alleged the children were trafficked to Côte d'Ivoire, forced into slavery, and experienced frequent beatings on a cocoa plantation. In September 2010, the US District Court for the Central District of California determined corporations cannot be held liable for violations of international law and dismissed the suit. The case was appealed to the US Court of Appeals.

== 2008 progress and Joint Statement ==
By the revised deadline—1 June 2008—all the objectives were still not met. Some progress had been made; for example, the cocoa industry had provided $10 million to the ICI. In 2006–07 the ICI had 17 training sessions in Côte d'Ivoire and 23 in Ghana to sensitize the governmental officials, police and media about child and adult labor practices. The focus of the Joint Statement was that of certification. The cocoa industry performed data collection had on 50% of the growing areas in both Côte d'Ivoire and Ghana. But independent verification, partially funded by industry, on those areas was not fully completed. The deadline was extended until the end of 2010. At that time, industry was required to have a full certification and independent verification.

All parties reaffirmed their commitment to eliminate the worst forms of child labor. The cocoa industry committed to work with the governments of Côte d'Ivoire and Ghana to set up independent certification by the end of 2010; assist the governments to target remediation efforts based on the independent certification; and support the ICI as it expands to more local communities and provide training on safe labor practices.

In 2009, cocoa from Côte d'Ivoire and Nigeria was added to a list of products made by forced child labor maintained by the Department of Labor. This listing stemmed from a request by Anti-Slavery International in 2004 to investigate if Ivorian cocoa should be on this list. Executive Order 13126 requires federal contractors who supply products on the list must prove they have made a good faith effort to determine if the products were produced under forced labor. Thus contractors must prove they have made a good faith effort to determine if cocoa was produced under forced labor. Côte d'Ivoire and Ghana were placed on the 2009 US State Department's Tier 2 Watch List for human trafficking due in part to the trafficking of children in cocoa production.

In 2009 the Department of Labor awarded a second, $1.2 million contract to the Payson Center to continue the oversight through 2011.

== 2010 Joint Declaration and Framework of Action ==
The 2010 Joint Declaration summarized the pledge of the Harkin–Engel Protocol and reaffirmed the commitment to achieve the objectives of the protocol. The purpose of the framework of action was to reduce the worst forms of child labor 70% by 2020. Specifically, they were to remove children from and prevent children's involvement in the worst forms of child labor, promote sustainable livelihoods for cocoa growers, establish and implement community-based child labor monitoring systems, and continue national child labor surveys. The Joint Declaration established the Child Labor Cocoa Coordinating Group to coordinate the activities of the framework and provide governance.

To achieve the goals, the governments of Côte d'Ivoire and Ghana must fund and conduct child labor surveys, provide remediation for children removed from the worst forms of child labor, prevent children from becoming involved in the worst forms of child labor, enforce laws to protect the children from the worst forms of child labor, and develop the infrastructure of the cocoa growing regions. The responsibility of the cocoa and chocolate industries is to continue to support the child labor surveys, support remediation efforts, provide sustainable livelihoods for the households of cocoa growers, try to ensure cocoa supply chains are using safe practices. The industries will commit $7 million over the next five years with the possibility of $3 million more for remediation activities. The responsibility of the US Department of Labor is to commit $10 million in 2010 for a multi-year program to support the framework and report on the progress of these efforts.

== 2011 status update ==
Household surveys and governmental research in Côte d'Ivoire and Ghana showed that there were 1.8 million children working in cocoa agriculture. About 5% in Côte d'Ivoire and 10% in Ghana worked for pay. Children are commonly involved in hazardous work and some are still involved in the worst forms of child labor.

Between 2001 and 2009, several thousand children were involved in remediation activities including in each country. These activities include withdrawal, rehabilitation, reinsertion, education and vocational training and these efforts were attributed to funding related to the Harkin–Engel Protocol. Less than 5% of all children were exposed to activities related to the protocol.

In 2011, the Payson Center reported the cocoa industry has not fully completed any of the six articles. Industry had not completed the 2005 Joint Statement commitment of certification for 50% of the growing areas in the two countries, much less the 2008 Joint Statement commitment of remediation activities in 100% of the growing areas. Côte d'Ivoire had only achieved remediation in 3.8% and Ghana in 31% of the growing areas.

The cocoa industry still has to prove it can self-regulate. The Payson Center recommended the industry create a certification system that can assure consumers the worst forms of child labor are not used in production, create an independent verification of that certification system, implement child labor monitoring systems, and increase remediation activities to address the worst forms of child labor.

== 2015–2018 status update ==
A study of the use of child labor in the cocoa fields, published in Fortune magazine in the U.S. in March 2016, concluded that approximately 2.1 million children in West Africa "still do the dangerous and physically taxing work of harvesting cocoa". The report suggested that it would be an uphill battle to improve the situation:

According to the 2015 edition of the Cocoa Barometer, a biennial report examining the economics of cocoa that's published by a consortium of nonprofits, the average farmer in Ghana in the 2013–14 growing season made just 84¢ per day, and farmers in Ivory Coast a mere 50¢. That puts them well below the World Bank's new $1.90 per day standard for extreme poverty, even if you factor in the 13% rise in the price of cocoa last year.

Sona Ebai, the former secretary general of the Alliance of Cocoa Producing Countries said that eradicating child labor was an immense task and that the chocolate companies' newfound commitment to expanding the investments in cocoa communities are not quite sufficient. ... "Best-case scenario, we're only doing 10% of what's needed. Getting that other 90% won't be easy. ... I think child labor cannot be just the responsibility of industry to solve. I think it's the proverbial all-hands-on-deck: government, civil society, the private sector. And there, you really need leadership."

Reported in 2018, a 3-year pilot program – conducted by Nestlé with 26,000 farmers mostly located in Côte d'Ivoire – observed a 51% decrease in the number of children doing hazardous jobs in cocoa farming. The US Department of Labor formed the Child Labor Cocoa Coordinating Group as a public-private partnership with the governments of Ghana and Côte d'Ivoire to address child labor practices in the cocoa industry. The International Cocoa Initiative involving major cocoa manufacturers established the Child Labor Monitoring and Remediation System intended to monitor thousands of farms in Ghana and Côte d'Ivoire for child labor conditions. Despite these efforts, goals to reduce child labor in West Africa by 70% before 2020 are frustrated by persistent poverty, absence of schools, expansion of cocoa farmland, and increased demand for cocoa.

In April 2018, the Cocoa Barometer 2018 report on the $100-billion industry, said this about the child labor situation: "Not a single company or government is anywhere near reaching the sectorwide objective of the elimination of child labour, and not even near their commitments of a 70% reduction of child labour by 2020". A report later that year by New Food Economy stated that the Child Labour Monitoring and Remediation Systems implemented by the International Cocoa Initiative and its partners has been useful, but "they are currently reaching less than 20 percent of the over two million children impacted".

Class action lawsuits in the US against companies in the cocoa industry have not achieved much success. In 2015, lawuits against Mars, Nestlé, and Hershey's alleged that their products' packaging failed to disclose that production may involve child slave labor. All were dismissed in 2016, although the plaintiffs filed an appeal.

Nestlé's website, as paraphrased by Mother Jones magazine, states:

The company has built or renovated 42 schools in cocoa-growing communities and has helped support families so they can afford to keep their kids in school rather than sending them off to work and the company has implemented a monitoring system, it says, to identify at-risk children and report the findings back to the company and its suppliers. When alerted to instances of child trafficking or slavery, "we report it to appropriate authorities immediately".

The company said it had spent $5.5 million on the problem in 2016. Note too that Nestlé had published a report in 2017 on child labour in the cocoa supply chain, Tackling Child Labour, with additional specifics as to their "approach to addressing this significant, complex and sensitive challenge".

Tulane University professor William Bertrand, a co-author of the 2015 report, made this comment in October 2018 to a journalist working for Mother Jones: "We don’t think conditions have changed significantly in terms of the number of children working." The publication concluded that, "despite some positive changes, such as an increase in the amount of finished chocolate sold in the Ivory Coast and Ghana – keeping more of the profits in the local economy – and the introduction of free primary education in the Ivory Coast, broad change is still elusive".

== 2021–2022 status update ==
In 2021, the nongovernmental organization International Rights Advocates filed a lawsuit on behalf of eight former child workers, accusing several multinational chocolate producers of aiding and abetting the illegal enslavement of children. The lawsuit was based in part on the Harkin-Engel Protocol. The lawsuit was dismissed in 2022 due to the plaintiffs' lack of standing.

== Criticism ==
In 2001, the Child Labor Coalition, a collection of advocacy groups focusing on child labor issues in the US and worldwide, criticized the protocol for only addressing Côte d'Ivoire and Ghana. It suggested extending the protocol to the whole world, because exploitative practices were also reported in the cocoa industries in Brazil and Indonesia. The Child Labor Coalition also recommended that the chocolate industry set the price of chocolate so that the producers make enough money to fairly compensate their workers.

In 2011, ten years after implementation, it was unclear if the protocol had any effect in reducing child labor. One Payson Center researcher claimed few of the protocol commitments have been implemented, but the ICI claimed five of the six articles have been completed and they are actively working on the sixth.

In 2012, Miki Mistrati, creator of the award-winning documentary, The Dark Side of Chocolate, claimed the protocol is just "a document and politics" because there has been no progress. He thinks that the same issues will be present in five years and that changes will not come through the protocol, but instead from consumers who demand change.

== See also ==
- Child labour in cocoa production

== Bibliography ==
- Payson Center for International Development and Technology Transfer (31 October 2007). "First annual report: Oversight of public and private initiatives to eliminate the worst forms of child labor in the cocoa sector in Cote d-Ivoire and Ghana" (PDF). Tulane University. Archived from the original (PDF) on 19 March 2012.
- Payson Center for International Development and Technology Transfer (30 September 2010). "Fourth Annual Report: Oversight of Public and Private Initiatives to Eliminate the Worst Forms of Child Labor in the Cocoa Sector of Côte d'Ivoire and Ghana" (PDF). Tulane University. Archived from the original (PDF) on 19 March 2012.
- Payson Center for International Development and Technology Transfer (31 March 2011). "Oversight of Public and Private Initiatives to Eliminate the Worst Forms of Child Labor in the Cocoa Sector of Côte d'Ivoire and Ghana" (PDF). Tulane University. Archived from the original (PDF) on 12 April 2012.
- David Wolfe & Shazzie (2005). Naked Chocolate: The Astonishing Truth about the World's Greatest Food. North Atlantic Books. ISBN 1556437315.
