= Heidi Shierholz =

American economist

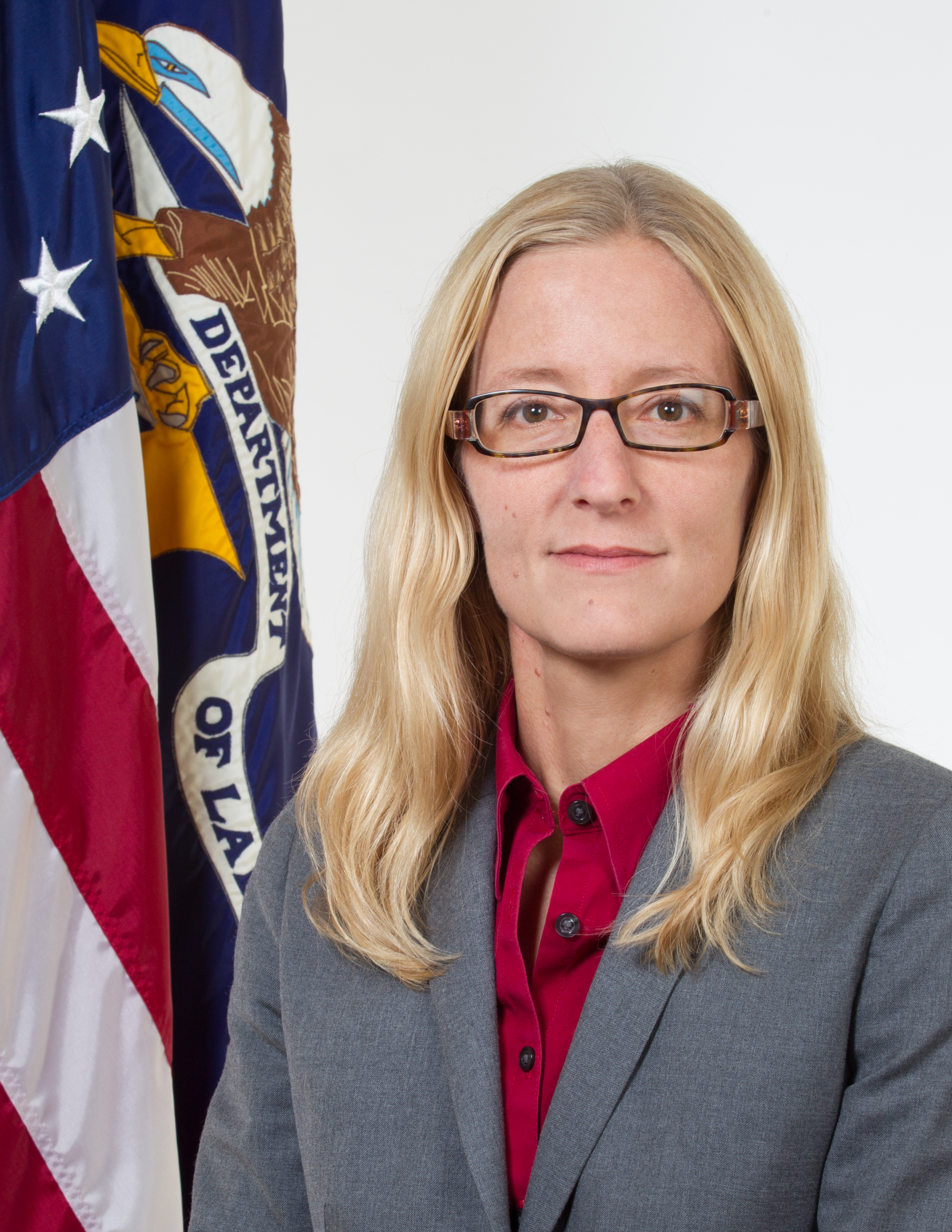

Chief Economist of the United States Department of Labor
- In office August 27, 2014 – January 20, 2017
- President: Barack Obama
- Preceded by: Jennifer Hunt
- Succeeded by: Janelle Jones

Personal details
- Born: October 10, 1971 (age 54)
- Party: Democratic
- Education: Grinnell College (BA); Iowa State University (MS); University of Michigan (MA, PhD)

Heidi Shierholz (born October 10, 1971) is an American economist and the president of the Economic Policy Institute, a left-leaning think tank based in Washington, D.C. She previously served as chief economist of the United States Department of Labor under Secretary Thomas Perez.

== Education ==
Shierholz studied mathematics at Grinnell College in Grinnell, Iowa, earning a B.A. in 1994. She earned a M.S. in statistics at Iowa State University in 1996. She then studied economics at the University of Michigan, earning a M.A. in 2001 and Ph.D. in 2005.

== Career ==
Shierholz worked as an assistant professor of economics at the University of Toronto from 2005 to 2007. She joined the Economic Policy Institute (EPI) in 2007, where she worked on unemployment policy and policies related to recovery from the Great Recession. She co-authored two editions of The State of Working America, EPI's flagship publication.

From 2014 to 2017, Shierholz served as chief economist of the United States Department of Labor under Secretary Thomas Perez during the Obama administration.

Shierholz rejoined the Economic Policy Institute after leaving the Department of Labor. In 2021, EPI announced that its board of directors had selected her to become the institute's president.

Before joining the Department of Labor, Shierholz regularly wrote for a number of publications, including the U.S. News & World Report column "Economic Intelligence" and The Washington Post. She has been called to testify before Congress on labor market issues, including unemployment insurance and immigration.

== Notable publications ==
- Mishel, Lawrence; Bivens, Josh; Gould, Elise; Shierholz, Heidi (December 18, 2012). The State of Working America, 12th Edition. Ithaca, New York: Cornell University Press. ISBN 978-0801478550. Archived from the original on December 8, 2013.
- Mishel, Lawrence; Bernstein, Jared; Shierholz, Heidi (March 26, 2009). The State of Working America, 2008/2009. Ithaca, New York: Cornell University Press. ISBN 978-0801474774.
- Wolfson, Martin H.; Epstein, Gerald A. (February 21, 2013). The Handbook of the Political Economy of Financial Crises. Oxford: Oxford University Press. ISBN 978-0-19-975723-7.
- "Heidi Shierholz". JSTOR.
