= Middle Class Working Families Task Force =

The Middle Class Working Families Task Force (MCWFTF) was a United States federal government initiative, established in 2009 via presidential memorandum. It was one of the earliest innovations of the Obama-Biden administration. Jared Bernstein was appointed the executive director, responsible for direct management of the project; while Vice-President Joseph Biden was appointed chairman, with final oversight and responsibility for the work. The purpose of the task force is to empower the American middle class and to explore the vision and possibilities of green jobs. The Middle Class Working Families Task Force studies and recommends far-reaching and imaginative solutions to problems working families face.

== Goals and objectives ==
The specific goals of the Task Force were the expansion of education and lifelong training opportunities, the improvement of work-family balance, the restoration of labor standards, the protection of middle-class and working-class family incomes, and the protection of retirement security. The major early initiatives of the task force are the expansion of education and training opportunities and raising the living standards of middle-class working families in America. One other early focus of the task force is the expansion of "green job" opportunities as a vehicle to rebuild and strengthen the middle class and, at the same time, saving billions of dollars in energy costs. The reduction of the providing load on coal-fired power plants (reducing air pollution) and retro-fitting American homes and buildings to be fuel efficient should extend substantial energy savings to the entire middle class.

== Roster ==
Roster
Joseph Biden	Chairman
Jared Bernstein	Executive Director
Hilda Solis	Department of Labor
Shaun Donovan	Department of Housing and Urban Development
Tom Vilsack	Department of Agriculture
Steven Chu	Department of Energy
Ron Kirk	US Trade Representative
Arne Duncan	Department of Education

== Main participating departments & agencies ==
The White House Council on Environmental Quality (CEQ) will play the convening and coordinating role to get agencies the help they need to identify and advance policies that will facilitate the continued growth of the energy efficiency sector, powered by private dollars. Other participating members included Departments of Agriculture, Commerce, Education, Energy, Health and Human Services, Housing and Urban Development, Labor, the Treasury, the General Services Administration, as well as the Directors of the National Economic Council. From the White House, the participants are the Office of Energy, Climate and Change, the Domestic Policy Council, the Office of Management and Budget, and the Council on Environmental Quality.

The planned benefit of these partnerships were the leveraging of resources to connect workers to green career pathways and sustainable employment; advancing existing and future training and education programs; and helping to ensure employers have access to a qualified workforce for the projected green economy of the 21st century.

== Meetings ==
The task force began working in January, 2009 to highlight policies and practices to help improve the standard of living of the US middle-class. Its first official meeting was on February 27, 2009, in Philadelphia at the University of Pennsylvania. The fourth was on May 26, 2009, at the Denver Museum of Nature and Science in Denver, CO. A June 2009 meeting took place in Perrysburg, Ohio with a topic of Promoting Manufacturing in America. In October 2009, Vice President Biden unveiled Recovery Through Retrofit, a report that builds on the foundation laid in the Recovery Act to expand green job opportunities and boost energy savings by making homes more energy efficient.

In April 2010 the MCWFTF held a meeting at the University of Milwaukee-Wisconsin's Luber School of Business on the topic on Wall Street reform.

== Green jobs ==
Green jobs - broadly defined as "related to improving the environment" - pay up to 20 percent more than other jobs. They are more often union jobs and likelier to be held by men as opposed to women. Participation in the green job marketplace among minorities and city dwellers is considerably lower than in the standard marketplace. Additionally, green jobs are largely domestic, and cannot be shipped overseas.

== Initiatives ==
The White House Task Force on the Middle Class announced initiatives developed during the past year with working families around the country and at the White House. The initiatives include:

- increasing the Child and Dependent Care Tax Credit for families making under $85,000 a year and a $1.6 billion increase in child care funding for families not yet a part of the middle class,
- limiting a graduate's federal loan repayments to 10 percent of his or her income above a basic living allowance,
- initiating a system of workplace IRAs, requiring all employers to give the option for employees to enroll in a direct-deposit IRA,
- expanding tax credits to match retirement savings and enacting additional safeguards to protect retirement savings.
- expanding support for families balancing work with caring for elderly relatives.

== Financial aid applications ==
Secretary of Education Arne Duncan announced a user-friendly FAFSA form that will make it easier to apply for financial aid. The FAFSA application will be streamlined with the IRS. The new version will increase access for hundreds of thousands of students who are eligible but do not apply for aid. Simplifying the financial aid application is a policy that emanates from meetings of the Middle Class Task Force.

== Bibliography ==
- Kornblut, Anne E. and Anthony Faiola (2009). "Biden to Lead Task Force on Issues of the Middle Class". The Washington Post. January 31.
- Sweet, Lynn (2009). "Biden to lead White House task force on the middle class." Chicago Sun-Times. January 30.
- Staff writers (2009). "Obama Creates Working Families Task Force". Political Affairs Magazine. January 31.
- White House (2009). Press Release: Vice President Biden announces Middle Class Task Force. January 30, 2009, at 10:00 am.
