= Klein–Goldberger model =

The Klein–Goldberger model was an early macroeconometric model for the United States developed by Lawrence Klein and Arthur Goldberger, Klein's doctoral student at the University of Michigan, in 1955. Grounded in Keynesian macroeconomic theory, it describes the workings of the United States economy in terms of 20 simultaneous equations, using time series data from 1929 to 1952. The Klein–Goldberger model extended the pioneering work of Jan Tinbergen in the 1940s, and paved the way for even larger models such as the Wharton models of the 1960s, or the Brookings model, with almost 400 equations.

The model was estimated with the limited information maximum likelihood method only, but alternative ordinary least squares estimations were provided by Karl A. Fox (1956).

In one of the earliest computational simulations of an econometric model, Irma and Frank Adelman (1959) tested the Klein–Goldberger model on an IBM 650 at the Berkeley Radiation Laboratory, and found that when shocked by disturbances, it generates fluctuations with the same characteristics as the business cycles observed in United States economic data.
