= Executive Order 13126 =

1999 United States executive order

Executive Order 13126, formally titled Prohibition of Acquisition of Products Produced by Forced or Indentured Child Labor, is an executive order signed by Bill Clinton on June 12, 1999, to ensure federal agencies enforce laws regarding forced labor. It requires the US Department of Labor to maintain a list of products and their countries of origin that have been produced by forced child labor. Federal contractors who supply products on the list must prove they have made a good faith effort to determine if the products were produced under forced labor.

The governance of the order fell under the purview of the Bureau of International Labor Affairs (ILAB). In January 2001, the list had 11 products from two countries. The current list, as compiled by ILAB, consists of 31 products including bamboo, beans, cocoa, coffee, nuts, rice, rubber, shrimp, and sugarcane. The products come from countries such as Afghanistan, Argentina, Benin, Bolivia, Burkina Faso, Burma, China, Colombia, Congo, Ethiopia, Ghana, India, Ivory Coast, Mali, Nepal, Nigeria, Pakistan, Russia, Sierra Leone, Tajikistan, Thailand and Uzbekistan.

== See also ==
- United States Department of Labor
- United States Department of State
- Harkin–Engel Protocol
- Child labor
- Children in cocoa production
