= Jennifer Hunt =

American economist

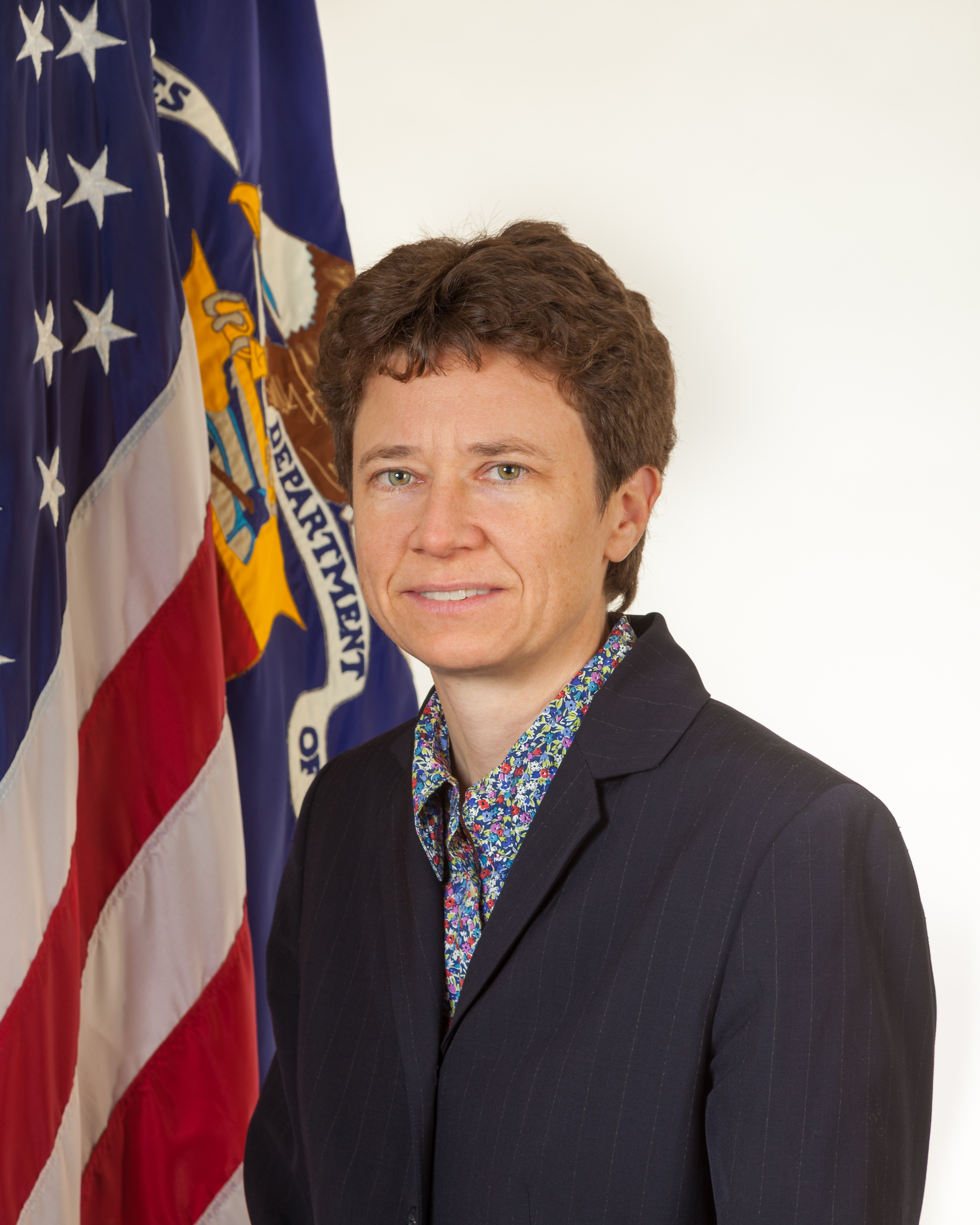

Deputy Assistant Secretary for Microeconomic Analysis U.S. Department of the Treasury
- In office March 17, 2013 – June 29, 2015
- President: Barack Obama
- Preceded by: Wes Yin

Chief Economist U.S. Department of Labor
- In office January 28, 2013 – March 14, 2014
- Preceded by: Adriana Kugler
- Succeeded by: Heidi Shierholz

Personal details
- Born: 1965 (age 60–61) Sydney, Australia
- Citizenship: United States
- Party: Democratic Party
- Education: International School of Geneva (IB); Massachusetts Institute of Technology (BS); Harvard University (PhD)
- Profession: Professor of Economics

Jennifer Hunt is a professor of economics at Rutgers University. She previously served as deputy assistant secretary for microeconomic analysis at the U.S. Department of the Treasury after serving a term as Chief Economist to the U.S. Secretary of Labor, serving under acting secretary Seth Harris and Secretary Thomas Perez. She is a research associate at the National Bureau of Economic Research. She has done research in the areas of employment and unemployment policy, immigration, wage inequality, transition economics, crime and corruption. Her past research focused on immigration and innovation in the United States, the U.S. science and engineering workforce, and the 2008-2009 recession in Germany. Her research on immigration has been cited by media in the context of immigration reform legislation, currently under consideration by the U.S. Congress. Her contemporary research focuses primarily on the geographic composition of technology, discrimination, and unemployment.

== Education ==
Jennifer Hunt graduated from the International School of Geneva with an International Baccalaureate degree in 1983. She then studied electrical engineering at Massachusetts Institute of Technology, earning a Scientiæ Baccalaureus in 1987. She then switched fields and studied economics at Harvard University, earning her Ph.D in 1992.

== Academic appointments ==
Jennifer Hunt began her academic career as an assistant professor at Yale University in 1992, becoming an associate professor in 1997. She moved to the University of Montreal in 2001 and McGill University in 2004. She has been a professor at Rutgers since 2011.

Professor Hunt has also held the following visiting positions:

- Universitat Autònoma de Barcelona, Institut d'Anàlisi Econòmica, July 2012
- University of Milan, Centro Studi Luco d'Agliano, June 2010
- University of British Columbia, Department of Economics, 2008-2009
- UCLA, Department of Economics, Spring 2006
- Dartmouth College, Department of Economics, Spring 2000
- German Institute for Economic Research (DIW-Berlin), SOEP Group, Fall 1999
- Stanford University, Hoover Institution, National Fellow, 1995-1996

Hunt is a research associate in labor studies at the National Bureau of Economic Research, a research fellow at the Centre for Economic Policy Research in London, and is on the Scientific Advisory Council of the American Institute for Contemporary German Studies in Washington D.C. and the Institut für Arbeitsmarkt- und Berufsforschung in Nuremberg.

Since 2012, Hunt has served as an associate editor of the Journal of Labor Economics. She is also an Editor of the Journal of Comparative Economics.

== Research awards ==
Hunt's paper, "How Much Does Immigration Boost Innovation?" (with coauthor Marjolaine Gauthier-Loiselle) won the American Economic Journal Best Paper in Macroeconomics Prize in 2013. Hunt was honored in 2012 as the keynote speaker at Verein für Socialpolitik annual conference, Göttingen. She was also keynote speaker at INSIDE third annual immigration conference, Barcelona, 2009, and Innis Lecturer at the Canadian Economics Association Meetings, 2004. In 2001 she received the DAAD Prize for Distinguished Scholarship in German Studies, and she was awarded "Best Paper Using the German Socio-Economic Panel 1984-99, scholar under 35," in 2000.

== Selected publications ==
- Burda, Michael; Hunt, Jennifer (2011). "What Explains the German Labor Market Miracle in the Great Recession?" (PDF). Brookings Papers on Economic Activity. 42 (1 – Spring): 273–335. doi:10.1353/eca.2011.0004. S2CID 154611490. Archived from the original (PDF) on 30 May 2013.
- Hunt, Jennifer (2011). "Which Immigrants Are Most Innovative and Entrepreneurial? Distinctions by Entry Visa" (PDF). Journal of Labor Economics. 29 (3): 417–457. doi:10.1086/659409. S2CID 154489630.
- Hunt, Jennifer; Gauthier-Loiselle, Marjolaine (2010). "How Much Does Immigration Boost Innovation?". American Economic Journal: Macroeconomics. 2 (2): 31–56. doi:10.1257/mac.2.2.31. hdl:10419/35709.
