= Jeff Faux =

American economist

Jeff Faux (born Geoffrey Faux in New York City) is the principal founder of the Economic Policy Institute and was its first president, from 1986 to 2002. He is now the Institute's Distinguished Fellow and also serves on its board of directors.

Faux was educated at Queens College, George Washington University, and Harvard University. He is the author of The Servant Economy (Wiley, 2012), The Global Class War (Wiley, 2006), The Party's Not Over (Basic Books, 1996) and co-author of Reclaiming America (M.E. Sharpe, 1996), Rebuilding America (Pantheon, 1984) and The Star-Spangled Hustle (Doubleday, 1972).

The Global Class War was translated into Spanish and Arabic. In 2009, New York Times reporter John Harwood wrote: "'The distribution of income and opportunity is likely to dominate the next stage of American politics,' Jeff Faux predicted in 'The Global Class War' in 2006. ...Then last fall, the financial crisis shoved other concerns aside and began to vindicate Mr. Faux's prediction."

Faux is also a contributing editor to Dissent Magazine and The American Prospect and serves on the board of directors of Campaign for America's Future.

Faux has received a Carnegie Scholar Award from the Carnegie Corporation of New York, the Weinberg Award from Wayne State University, a fellowship at the Harvard Institute of Politics, and an honorary doctorate from the University of New England.

Prior to starting the Economic Policy Institute, he was the co-director of the Center for Economic Alternatives. He is a former economist for the U.S. Departments of State, Commerce, and Labor, and former director of economic development for the U.S. Office of Economic Opportunity.

== Books ==
- The Servant Economy (Wiley, 2012)
- The Global Class War (Wiley, 2006)
- The Party's Not Over (Basic Books, 1996)
- Reclaiming America (M.E. Sharpe, 1996) (co-author)
- Rebuilding America (Pantheon, 1984)
- The Star-Spangled Hustle (Doubleday, 1972)
