= Crunch =

Crunch may refer to:

== Athletics ==
- Crunch (exercise), abdominal exercise
- Syracuse Crunch, a professional ice hockey team in the American Hockey League
- Le Crunch, the traditional name for the England–France rugby match at the Six Nations Championship

== Media ==
- Crunch (book), a book written by Jared Bernstein
- The Crunch (comics), an A4 British comic
- Crunch (TV programming block), a former Saturday morning programming block dedicated to animation on the Canadian television channel YTV
- Crunch Bandicoot, a character from the Crash Bandicoot franchise of video games
- Crunch, a term used in the context of role-playing games

=== Music ===
- The Crunch (band), an English/Swedish power pop group
- Crunch!, a 1990 album by British ska band The Nutty Boys
- Crunch, an album by Cry Wolf
- Crunch, a 2000 album by American heavy metal band Impellitteri
- The Crunch, a 1984 EP by British post-punk/alternative rock band The Nightingales
- "Crunch", a song by Moka Only and Swollen Members from Lime Green
- "The Crunch", a 1977 single by English producer, arranger, conductor and multi-instrumentalist Richard Anthony Hewson

== Other uses ==
- Crunch (chocolate bar), a chocolate bar made of milk chocolate and crisped rice
- Crunch Fitness, a chain of over 300 franchised fitness clubs located in the United States, Canada and Australia
- Crunch (video games), a period in which video game developers take on significant, often uncompensated overtime
- Crunchiness, the sensation of muffled grinding of a foodstuff
- Crunch, an alias of John Draper (born 1943), American computer programmer and former phone phreak

== See also ==
- Big Crunch, a hypothetical scenario for the ultimate fate of the universe
- Credit crunch, a sudden reduction in the general availability of loans or a sudden tightening of the requirement conditions
