= Barry Bluestone =

American academic

Barry Alan Bluestone (born December 27, 1944) is an American academic who is the Stearns Trustee Professor of Political Economy, founding director of the Kitty and Michael Dukakis Center for Urban and Regional Policy, and the founding dean of the School of Public Policy & Urban Affairs at Northeastern University in Boston, Massachusetts.

Previously he was Professor of Political Economy at the University of Massachusetts Boston. He also taught economics at Boston College where he served as director of the university's Social Welfare Research Institute. He is also one of five co-founders of the Economic Policy Institute. In the 1980s and the 1990s he collaborated with the late economist Bennett Harrison on several publications.

== Education ==
Bluestone attended University of Michigan where he received his Ph.D. (1974).

== Writings ==
Bluestone has written extensively and has authored or co-authored a number of books focused on political economy and society including: The Deindustrialization of America (1982), The Great U-Turn: Corporate Restructuring and the Polarizing of America (1988), Negotiating the Future: A Labor Perspective on American Business (1992), Growing Prosperity: The Battle for Growth with Equity in the 21st Century (2000),The Prosperity Gap: A Chartbook of American Living Standards (2000), The Boston Renaissance: Race, Space, and Economic Change in an American Metropolis (2001), Beyond the Ruins: The Meanings of Deindustrialization (2003), The Urban Experience: Economics, Society, and Public Policy (2008).

== Government service ==
In 1995, Bluestone served as policy staff member for Congressman Richard Gephardt Democratic Leader of the U.S. House of Representatives.

== Trump statement controversy ==
On February 5, 2018, a clip of a January 2018 lecture given by Bluestone was posted online in which he criticized President Donald Trump. In the clip, Bluestone said that "Sometimes I want to just see [Trump] impeached other times, quite honestly -- I hope there are no FBI agents here -- I wouldn’t mind seeing him dead." In a subsequent interview with the Boston Globe, Bluestone explained that his remark was "offhand" and that he does not condone violence or want President Trump assassinated. He later apologized for his remarks, saying that he meant that he would have liked to see Trump "disappear from the White House."
