= George S. Tavlas =

Greek-American economist

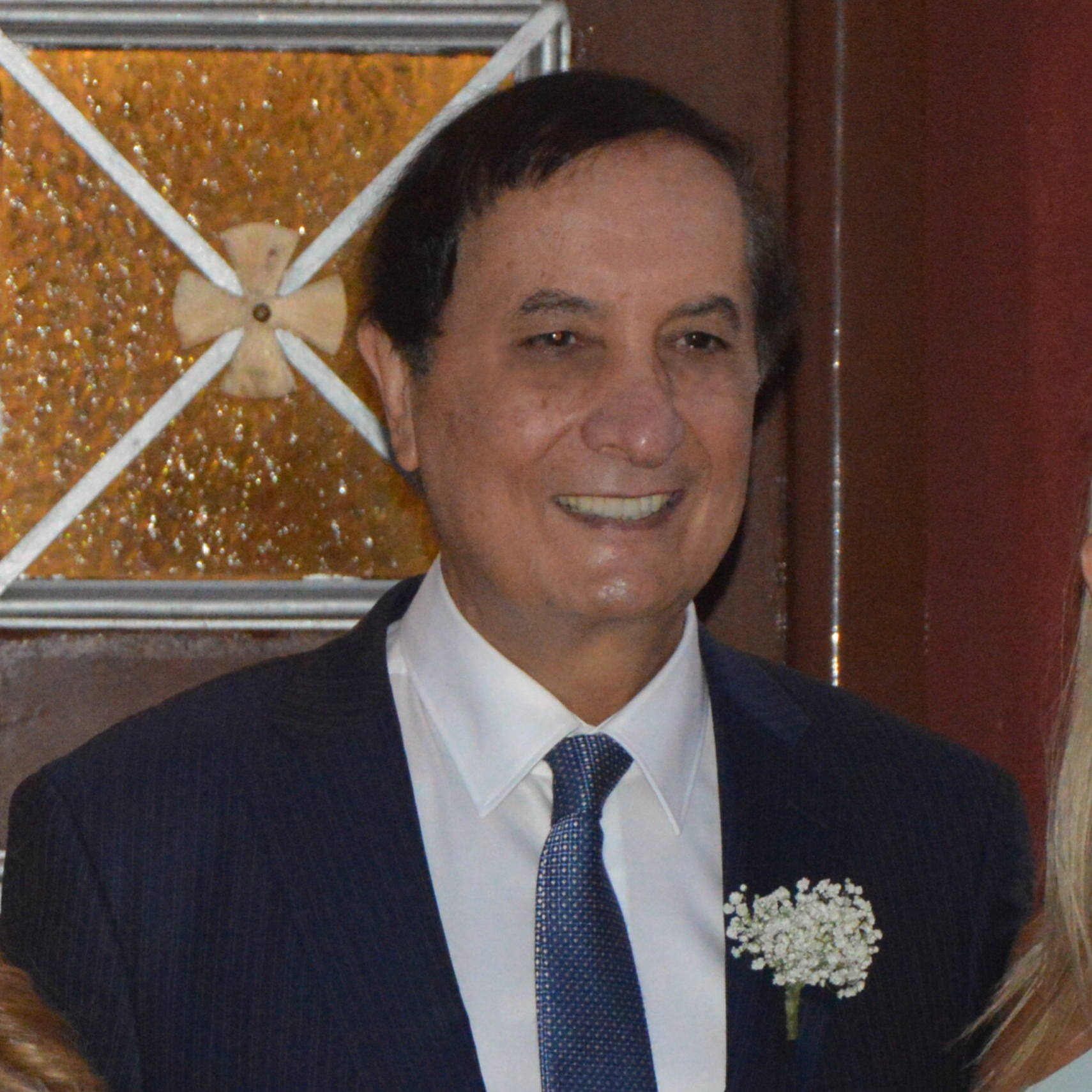
- George S. Tavlas in 2016
- Occupation: Economist

George S. Tavlas is a Greek-American economist. Tavlas has been the Alternate to the Governor of the Bank of Greece for the European Central Bank since 2008. He has been a Distinguished Visiting Fellow at the Hoover Institution at Stanford University since 2016.

Tavlas was the Director General of the Bank of Greece from 2010 to 2013, and a member of the General Council and the Monetary Policy Council of the Bank of Greece from 2013 to 2020. He was also an advisor to the Greek central bank's governor when the country entered the Eurozone, and was involved in the management and resolution of the Greek government-debt crisis.

== Life and work ==
Tavlas was born in Worcester, Massachusetts to parents who immigrated to the United States from Greece. He earned his B.A. from Babson College and his M.A. from New York University (NYU). He then earned his Ph.D. from NYU in 1977 after completing his dissertation titled: Essays on the Doctrinal Development of Milton Friedman's Monetary Economics.

Tavlas started his career as an economist in the U.S. Department of State. He was an advisor for the World Bank and the Organization for Economic Cooperation and Development. Before joining the Bank of Greece, he was a Division Chief at the International Monetary Fund.

In addition to his roles at the Bank of Greece, from 2016 to 2019, Tavlas formed a part of the supervisory board of the Hellenic Corporation for Assets and Participations (HCAP), the sovereign wealth fund of the Greek state. During his tenure, he assisted in the creation and implementation of the policies responsible for the privatization of state-held assets in Greece as well as the supervision of the portfolio of state-held assets in Greece.

=== Academia ===
Tavlas is an active researcher in the areas of international monetary economics, monetary doctrine, and time-series econometrics, with numerous academic publications.

His work in international monetary economics has focused on (1) the factors that determine the international use of currencies, including the use of the U.S. dollar internationally, and (2) the conditions that need to be fulfilled for a group of countries to form a single currency union (such as that of the euro area) – what Tavlas has dubbed "the new theory of optimum currency areas." Tavlas's work in monetary doctrine has focused on tracing the historical antecedents of contemporary monetary policy, including the antecedents of Monetarism. His work on monetary doctrine has also investigated the origins of the debates about fixed-versus-flexible exchange rates from the 1940s to the 1970s.

In the area of time series econometrics, Tavlas, along with collaborator P. A. V. B. Swamy and Stephen G. Hall, has extended the method of random coefficient estimation so that the estimated coefficients are unbiased and efficient. Recently, Tavlas, along with Deborah Gefang, Stephen G. Hall, and Yongli Wang have developed a method that allows spatial econometrics to quantify spillover effects among economic entities (regions, countries).In several recent papers, those researchers jointly develop a Vector Autoregression (VAR) procedure that allows them to quantify how a change in monetary policy affects members of a common currency area when those members have heterogeneous economies.

Tavlas was an Editor-in-Chief of Open Economies Review (published by Springer) from 2005 until 2025. He has been on the editorial boards of numerous journals.

Tavlas was a visiting professor at Leicester University and a Visiting Scholar at the Brookings Institution, the Becker Friedman Institute at the University of Chicago, the South African Reserve Bank, the Lebow School of Business at Drexel University, and Duke University's Center for the History of Political Economy.

Awards

In 2006 Tavlas received the Willard Duncan Carpenter Award, given biannually by Babson College, for "excellent scholarship in economic sciences and contributions to the public interest." In 2019, he delivered the Seventh Annual Marco Minghetti Lecture at the Instituto Luigi Struzo, in Rome, in 2019. In December 2025, Tavlas was the recipient of the annual award of Greece's Financial Engineering and Banking Society (FEBS) for his scientific contributions in the areas of banking and finance. In May 2026, Tavlas received the Award of Appreciation from the Department of Economics of the University of Crete.

==== The Monetarists ====
Tavlas' book, The Monetarists: The Making of the Chicago Monetary Tradition, 1927 to 1960 (published in June 2023 by the University of Chicago Press), is a detailed history of the development of the school of thought, known as Monetarism. It traces its beginnings from the works of a group of University of Chicago economists in the late 1920s to the works of Milton Friedman in the late 1950s and beyond.

The book is significant as it reshapes the understanding of the origins of Friedman's ideas related to Monetarism. Previously, the consensus among doctrinal historians was that, contrary to Friedman's claims, an earlier unique Chicago monetary tradition either did not exist or was not influential. Tavlas' book analyzes original sources, many of which were previously unpublished, to demonstrate that Friedman's monetary economics were indeed derived from an earlier Chicago monetary tradition. The book has been highly praised as "a very important contribution/original and comprehensive", "brilliant, powerful", significant/engaging/compelling/monumental historical study", "magnum opus/outstanding", "beautiful", "fascinating, scholarly and sympathetic/a fascinating intellectual history", "splendid", "the definitive history of the Chicago monetarists", "masterful".

== Selected publications ==
- Tavlas, George S. (1981) "Keynesian and Monetarist Theories of the Monetary Transmission Process: Doctrinal Aspects." Journal of Monetary Economics 7, issue 3 (May): 317–337.
- Tavlas, George S. (1991) On the International Use of Currencies: The Case of the Deutsche Mark. Essays in International Finance (Princeton University, International Finance Section of the Department of Economics, No. 181 (March). Reprinted in Functioning of the International Monetary System, edited by J. Frenkel and M. Goldstein (International Monetary Fund: Washington, D.C., 1996), pp. 806–50.
- Tavlas, George S. (1993) "The 'New' Theory of Optimum Currency Areas." World Economy 16, no. 6 (November): 663-685.
- Tavlas, George S. (1997) "Chicago, Harvard, and the Doctrinal Foundations of Monetary Economics." Journal of Political Economy 105, no. 1 (February): 153–177.
- Christou, Costas, Swamy, P.A.V.B., and George S. Tavlas (1998) "A Generalized Framework for Predicting Returns in Multicurrency Investments." Journal of Economic Dynamics and Control 22, issue 7 (July): 977–1000.
- Dellas, Harris and George S. Tavlas (2005) "Wage Rigidity and Monetary Union." Economic Journal 115, issue 506 (October): 907–927.
- Swamy, P.A.V.B. and George S. Tavlas (2007) "The New Keynesian Phillips Curve and Inflation Expectations: Re-specification and Interpretation." Economic Theory 31, issue 2 (May): 293–306.
- Tavlas, George, Dellas, Harris, and Alan C. Stockman (2008) "The Classification and Performance of Alternative Exchange-Rate Systems." European Economic Review 52, no. 6 (August): 941–963.
- Tavlas, George S. (2015) "In Old Chicago: Simons, Friedman and the Development of Monetary-Policy Rules." Journal of Money, Credit and Banking 47, no. 1 (February): 99–121.
- Dellas, Harris and George S. Tavlas (2022) "Retrospectives: On the Evolution of the Rules versus Discretion Debate in Monetary Policy." Journal of Economic Perspectives 36, issue 3 (summer): 245–60.
- Hall, Stephen G., Tavlas, George, and Yongli Wang (2023) "Forecasting Inflation: The Use of Dynamic Factor Analysis and Nonlinear Combinations." Journal of Forecasting 42, issue 3 (April): 514–29.
- Hall, Stephen G., Wang, Yongli, and George S. Tavlas (2023) "Drivers and Spillover Effects of Inflation: The United States, the Euro Area, and the United Kingdom." Journal of International Money and Finance 131 (March): 1-31.
- Tavlas, George S. (2024) "The Case for Flexible Exchange Rates in 1953 and 1969: Friedman versus Johnson." Journal of Money, Credit and Banking. Published online on April 15.
- Hetzel, Robert L., Humphrey, Thomas M., and George S. Tavlas (2024) "Carl Snyder, the Real Bills Doctrine, and the New York Fed in the Great Depression." Journal of the History of Economic Thought 47, issue 2 (June): 187-212.
- Tavlas, George S. (2025) "'The Quartet' and Reform of the Exchange Rate System, 1945-73: A Historical Reconstitution." Hoover Institution Economics Working Paper no. 25117 (November).
- Gefang, Deborah, Hall, Stephen G., Tavlas George S. and Yongli Wang (2024) "Quantifying Spillovers among Regions." Journal of International Money and Finance 140, article 102993 (February).
