= Lawrence Mishel =

American economist

Larry Mishel
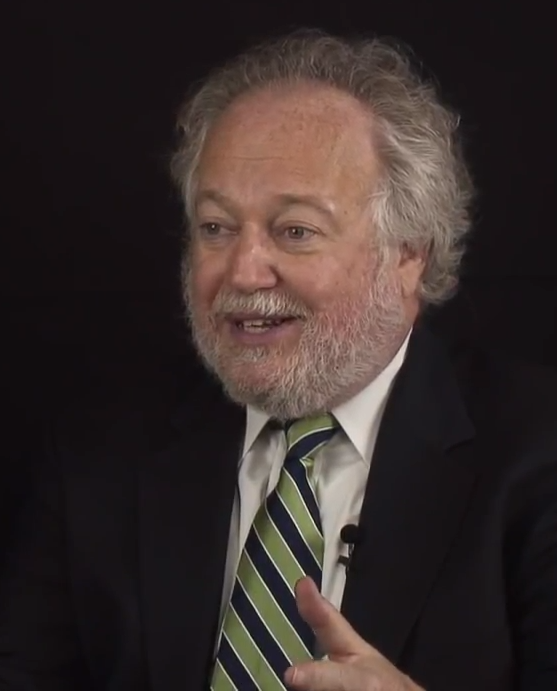
- Born: 1953 (age 72–73)
- Education: Pennsylvania State University (BS); American University (MA); University of Wisconsin, Madison (PhD)

Lawrence Mishel is a distinguished fellow at the Economic Policy Institute in Washington, D.C., a pro-labor think-tank that seeks to advance the interests of American workers. He has been at EPI since 1987, first serving as Research Director, then as vice-president and then as president from 2002 to 2017.

Mishel is the senior author of EPI's biannual (even-numbered years) flagship publication, The State of Working America, a comprehensive summary of the United States labor market and living standards, which first appeared in 1988.

- "Education: Ph.D. Economics, University of Wisconsin; M.A. Economics, American University; B.S. Pennsylvania State University."

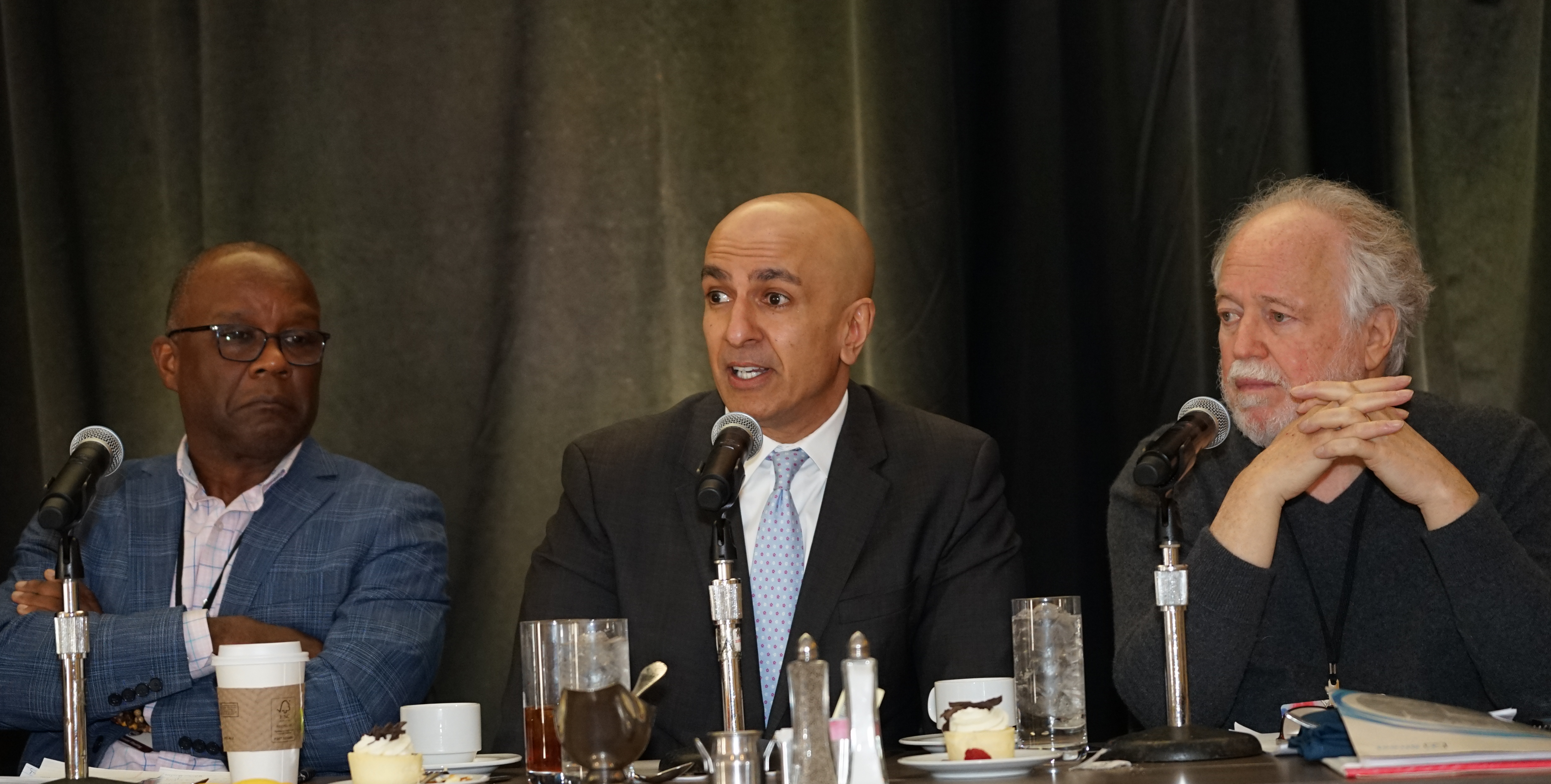
William Rodgers, Neel Kashkari, Mishel at ASSA 2026 honoring Bill Spriggs

Paul Krugman, a Nobel laureate in economics and a noted progressive columnist, argued in Nov. '08 that, given the centrist makeup of President Barack Obama's economic inner circle, the new Economic Recovery Advisory Board could be used to "give progressive economists a voice," and mentioned Mishel among others as a progressive economist who might be suitable for the board.

== Bibliography ==
- Lawrence Mishel; Josh Bivens; Elise Gould; Heidi Shierholz (December 18, 2012). The State of Working America. Cornell University Press. ISBN 9780801451706.
