= Support for East European Democracy Act of 1989 =

Support for East European Democracy (SEED) Act of 1989 are a series of legislative acts of the US Congress from 1989 to 1995. These are pre-eminent financial laws.

Adopted by the Chambers of the 101st US Congress (3 January 1989 - 3 January 1991), 102nd US Congress (3 January 1991 - 3 January 1993), 103rd US Congress (3 January 1993 - 3 January) 1995) and the 104th US Congress (January 3, 1995 - January 3, 1997).

The laws were passed under continuous dominance in both chambers of the US Congress of Democrats and the presidency of 2 presidents - George H. W. Bush and Bill Clinton.

The legislation is an expression of US policy towards Central and Eastern European countries, which were previously members of the Warsaw Pact and the Council for Mutual Economic Assistance. Initially targeted at Poland and Hungary, they subsequently encompassed Albania, Bulgaria, the Czech Republic, Slovakia, Estonia, Latvia, Lithuania, Romania and the countries of the former Socialist Federal Republic of Yugoslavia.

The legislative focus is on the establishment of democratic institutions in these countries through aid for agriculture, private sector development, trade and investment, educational, cultural, and scientific activities, as well as specific programs. A prerequisite for so-called financial assistance is the removal of trade restrictions, the liberalization of investment and capital, including through foreign investment, and the exportation of profits from these countries by foreign (US) investors. The other focus is on the development of the capital financial markets in these countries, and in particular on the privatization and concession of public assets.

== Results ==
30 years after the changes in Central and Eastern Europe, there is no alignment of the standard of living in these countries as a whole with those of Western Europe. There is also a demographic collapse, coupled with the export of labor from these countries to the countries of the so-called Old Europe.

== See also ==
- Percentages agreement
- Revolutions of 1989
- Malta Summit
- Old Europe and New Europe
