= Bennett Harrison =

American economist

Bennett Harrison (June 27, 1942 Jersey City – January 17, 1999, Brooklyn Heights) was a leading radical political economist, writer, musician, songwriter. Among his academic appointments was professor of political economy at MIT, Boston. Harrison held posts at Harvard University, New School for Social Research, and Carnegie Mellon University. Harrison taught in universities in Italy and Japan.

== Biography ==
His father was Leo Harrison, while his sister is Deborah Harrison Kuperman.

His father's name was Horowitz but he eventually changed it to Harrison to get a job at a radio station. Bennett Harrison studied at Brandeis University, and then earned a Ph.D. in economics in 1970 at the University of Pennsylvania. His first book was about economic development in Harlem.

Bennett published a book in 1994, Lean and Mean, challenging a widely held belief that small and medium firms or businesses are responsible for the majority of economic innovation, growth and job creation.

Focused on exposing the "middle-class malaise" and social inequalities, he argued in favor of more government involvement in the US economy, and contributed to the creation of the Union of Radical Political Economists in the 1960s. He devised economic development plans for Senator Fred Harris of Oklahoma in 1972.

Economist Barry Bluestone joined him in writing this and other books in the 1980s and 1990s. The writers frequently wrote on deindustrialization, urban economic planning, racism, inequality and radical economic policies.

In 1991, he left the urban studies and planning department at MIT to follow his then-wife in Pittsburgh.

Just days before his death, he married Joan Fitzgerald.

== Publications ==
- Harrison, Bennett (1973). Education, Training and the Urban Ghetto. The Johns Hopkins University Press. ISBN 978-0801813665.
- Harrison, Bennett (1974). Urban economic development;: Suburbanization, minority opportunity, and the condition of the central city. Urban Institute. ISBN 978-0877660989.
- Harrison, Bennett; Bluestone, Barry (1984). Deindustrialization of America: Plant Closings, Community Abandonment and the Dismantling of Basic Industry. Basic Books.
- Harrison, Bennett; Bluestone, Barry (1988). The Great U-Turn: Corporate Restructuring And The Polarizing Of America. Basic Books. ISBN 978-0465027194.
- Harrison, Bennett (1994). Lean and Mean: The Changing Landscape of Corporate Power in the Age of Flexibility. Basic Books. ISBN 978-0465069422.
- Harrison, Bennett (1998). Workforce Development Networks: Community-Based Organizations and Regional Alliances. Sage Publications. ISBN 978-0761908470.
- von Furstenberg, George M.; Harrison, Bennett; Horowitz, Ann R., eds. (1974). Patterns of Racial Discrimination Vols 1 & 2. Lexington, Mass.: Lexington Books.
