= Payson Center for International Development =

The Payson Center for International Development at Tulane University in New Orleans, Louisiana, United States, was an interdisciplinary center for the study of international development.

== Degrees conferred ==
The Payson Center conferred the following major and degrees:

- Undergraduate major in international development
- Master of Science
- Joint Juris Doctor and Master of Science
- Master of Laws (LLM) in Development
- Doctorate

== History ==
The Payson Center was founded in 1998 by William E. Bertrand and Eamon Kelly as the Payson School for International Development and Technology Transfer, with a focus on information and communication technology in international development. Up until 2007 Payson maintained an office in Arlington, VA.

In 2008 it was reorganized as part of the Tulane Law School, which at the time was a unique affiliation. In 2015, the Center underwent another restructuring and no longer exists as a functioning entity.
