= List of Department of Labor appointments by Joe Biden =

Below is a list of nominations and appointments to the Department of Labor by Joe Biden, the 46th president of the United States. As of June 1, 2024, according to tracking by The Washington Post and Partnership for Public Service, 12 nominees have been confirmed, 1 nominee is being considered by the Senate, 2 positions do not have nominees, and 3 appointments have been made to positions that don't require Senate confirmation.

== Color key ==
Denotes appointees awaiting Senate confirmation.

Denotes appointees serving in an acting capacity.

Denotes appointees who have left office or offices which have been disbanded.

== Appointments ==
Office	Nominee	Assumed office	Left office
— Secretary of Labor
— Secretary of Labor	Julie Su	March 11, 2023	—
— Secretary of Labor	Marty Walsh	March 23, 2021 (Confirmed March 22, 2021, 68–29)	March 11, 2023
— Deputy Secretary of Labor	Julie Su	July 17, 2021 (Confirmed July 13, 2021, 50–47)	—
— Solicitor of Labor	Seema Nanda	July 14, 2021 (Confirmed July 14, 2021, 53–46)	—
— Assistant Secretary of Labor (Congressional and Intergovernmental Affairs)	Elizabeth Watson	August 31, 2022 (Confirmed May 18, 2022, 50–45)	—
— Assistant Secretary of Labor (Disability Employment Policy)	Taryn Williams	August 26, 2021 (Confirmed August 11, 2021 by voice vote)	—
— Assistant Secretary of Labor (Employee Benefits)	Lisa Gomez	October 11, 2022 (Confirmed September 29, 2022, 49–36)	—
— Assistant Secretary of Labor (Employment and Training)	José Javier Rodríguez	April 2024 (Confirmed March 21, 2024, 50–48)	—
— Assistant Secretary of Labor (Mine Safety and Health)	Christopher J. Williamson	April 11, 2022 (Confirmed March 29, 2022 by voice vote)	—
— Assistant Secretary of Labor (Occupational Safety and Health)	Douglas L. Parker	November 3, 2021 (Confirmed October 25, 2021, 50–41)	—
— Assistant Secretary of Labor (Policy)	Rajesh Nayak	December 16, 2021 (Confirmed November 3, 2021, 52–45)	May 2024
— Assistant Secretary of Labor (Veterans' Employment and Training)	James D. Rodriguez	May 5, 2022 (Confirmed May 4, 2022 by voice vote)	—
— Assistant Secretary of Labor (Administration and Management)	Carolyn Angus Hornbuckle	October 2023	—
— Assistant Secretary of Labor (Administration and Management)	Rachana Desai Martin	September 9, 2021	April 2023
— Assistant Secretary of Labor (Public Affairs)	Julie McClain Downey	February 27, 2023	—
— Assistant Secretary of Labor (Public Affairs)	Elizabeth Alexander	January 21, 2021	November 14, 2022
— Inspector General of Labor	Larry Turner	December 7, 2021 (Confirmed December 2, 2021 by voice vote)	—
Bureau of Labor Statistics
— Commissioner of the Bureau of Labor Statistics	Erika McEntarfer	January 31, 2024 (Confirmed January 11, 2024, 86–8)	—
Wage and Hour Division
— Administrator of the Wage and Hour Division	Jessica Looman	October 26, 2023 (Confirmed October 25, 2023, 51–46)	—
Women's Bureau
— Director of the Women's Bureau	Wendy Chun-Hoon	February 1, 2021	—

== Withdrawn nominations ==
Office	Nominee	Announced	Withdrawn	Notes
— Secretary of Labor	Julie Su	February 28, 2023	January 3, 2025	
— Administrator of the Wage and Hour Division	David Weil	June 3, 2021	April 7, 2022	

== See also ==
- Cabinet of Joe Biden, for the vetting process undergone by top-level roles including advice and consent by the Senate
- List of executive branch 'czars' e.g. Special Advisor to the President

== Notes ==
Confirmation votes

Confirmations by roll call vote

Confirmations by voice vote
