= Crunch (book) =

Book by Jared Bernstein

Crunch: Why Do I Feel So Squeezed? (And Other Unsolved Economic Mysteries)
- Author: Jared Bernstein
- Publisher: Berrett-Koehler Publishers
- Publication date: 2008
- Pages: 240
- ISBN: 978-1-57675-477-1
- OCLC: 156834521
- Dewey Decimal: 330.973 22
- LC Class: HC106.83 .B472 2008

Crunch: Why Do I Feel So Squeezed? (And Other Unsolved Economic Mysteries) (ISBN 978-1-57675-477-1) is a book written by Jared Bernstein, Chief Economist and Economic Policy Advisor to Vice President Joe Biden, and published in 2008. In it, Bernstein offers a layman's introduction to how the U.S. economic system works. Using economic inequality as the basis of his argument, Bernstein explains why Americans still feel squeezed during boom times, what he believes is wrong with the economy, and how he believes it could be improved for the greater common good.

== Reception ==
The book received reviews from publications including Publishers Weekly and Labor Studies Journal.
