= All Together Now (book) =

Book by Jared Berstein

All Together Now: Common Sense for a Fair Economy
- Author: Jared Bernstein
- Publisher: Berrett-Koehler Publishers
- Publication date: 2006
- Pages: 154
- ISBN: 978-1-57675-387-3
- OCLC: 68812247
- Dewey Decimal: 330.973 22
- LC Class: HC106.83 .B47 2006

All Together Now: Common Sense for a Fair Economy (ISBN 978-1-57675-387-3) is a book written by Jared Bernstein, Chief Economist and Economic Policy Advisor to Vice President Joe Biden, and published in 2006. In it, Bernstein lays the groundwork of what he argues are deep-rooted problems within the U.S. economic system and offers a collaborative solution in which economic risk is shouldered equally at all levels. Bernstein uses the issues of globalization, health care, and income inequality as his case examples of how to improve government policy.

Bernstein often uses the acronyms WITT (we're in this together) and YOYO (you're on your own) to define a basic difference in contemporary political thinking. He promotes the benefits of a "WITT" ideal while describing faults of a "YOYO" attitude.

== Reception ==
The book received a generally positive reception, receiving reviews from academic journals including New Labor Forum and Community Development (Taylor & Francis), along with having excerpts published in The New York Times.

The book was also reviewed by the magazine Industrial Worker and a number of other publications.
