= Journal of the American Statistical Association =

- Discipline: Statistics
- Language: English

Publication details
- Former names: Publications of the American Statistical Association; Quarterly Publications of the American Statistical Association
- History: 1888–present
- Publisher: Taylor & Francis on behalf of the American Statistical Association
- Frequency: Quarterly
- Impact factor: 4.0 (2025)

Standard abbreviations
- ISO 4: J. Am. Stat. Assoc.
- MathSciNet: J. Amer. Statist. Assoc.

Indexing
- ISSN: 0162-1459 (print); 1537-274X (web)
- LCCN: 07022199
- JSTOR: 01621459
- OCLC no.: 1480864

Links
- Journal homepage; Online access; Online archive

The Journal of the American Statistical Association is a quarterly peer-reviewed scientific journal published by Taylor & Francis on behalf of the American Statistical Association. It covers work primarily focused on the application of statistics, statistical theory and methods in economic, social, physical, engineering, and health sciences. The journal also includes reviews of books which are relevant to the field. The journal was established in 1888 as the Publications of the American Statistical Association. It was renamed Quarterly Publications of the American Statistical Association in 1912, obtaining its current title in 1922.

== Reception ==
According to the Journal Citation Reports, the journal has a 2025 impact factor of 4.0.

In a 2003 survey of statisticians, the journal was ranked first in the category "Applications of Statistics" and second (after Annals of Statistics) for "Mathematical Statistics".
