= Economic Modelling =

- Discipline: Economics
- Language: English
- Edited by: A. C. Chu; S. K. Mallick

Publication details
- History: 1984-present
- Publisher: Elsevier
- Frequency: Monthly
- Impact factor: 3.875 (2021)

Standard abbreviations
- ISO 4: Econ. Model.

Indexing
- ISSN: 0264-9993
- LCCN: 91649202
- OCLC no.: 10479785

Links
- Journal homepage; Online access

Economic Modelling is a monthly peer-reviewed academic journal on economics published by Elsevier. The editors-in-chief are Angus C. Chu (University of Macau) and Sushanta K. Mallick (Queen Mary University of London).

== Abstracting and indexing ==
The journal is abstracted and indexed by the Social Sciences Citation Index, Current Contents/Social and Behavioral Sciences, EconLit, International Bibliography of the Social Sciences, ProQuest, Research Papers in Economics, Scopus, and the Social Science Research Network. According to the Journal Citation Reports, the journal has a 2021 impact factor of 3.875.
