= Henry Ludwell Moore =

American economist (1869–1958)

- Born: November 21, 1869; Charles County, Maryland, U.S.
- Died: April 28, 1958 (aged 88)

Academic background
- Education: Johns Hopkins University; Randolph-Macon College
- Doctoral advisor: Simon Newcomb; John Bates Clark
- Influences: Carl Menger, Karl Pearson, Vilfredo Pareto, Léon Walras

Academic work
- Discipline: Econometrics
- Institutions: Columbia University; Smith College
- Doctoral students: Frank H. Hankins; Henry Schultz

Henry Ludwell Moore (November 21, 1869 – April 28, 1958) was an American economist known for his pioneering work in econometrics. Paul Samuelson named Moore (along with Harry Gunnison Brown, Allyn Abbott Young, Wesley Clair Mitchell, Frank Knight, Jacob Viner, and Henry Schultz) as one of the several "American saints in economics" born after 1860.

== Early life and education ==
Moore was born in Charles County, Maryland, the first of 15 children. He received a B.A. from Randolph-Macon College in 1892 and a Ph.D. from Johns Hopkins University in 1896. His thesis was "Von Thünen's Theory of Natural Wages."

An excellent student at Randolph-Macon, his education in mathematics and statistics was largely self-taught, though in 1909 and 1913 he took courses in Mathematical Statistics and in Correlation with Karl Pearson.

Moore frequently traveled to Europe during his PhD. to seek out economists, seeing Leon Walras in 1903, Vilfredo Pareto in 1908, and Ladislaus Bortkiewicz in 1912, among others.

== Academic career ==
Moore was employed by Johns Hopkins University as an instructor in 1896, and as a lecturer the following year.

He would then serve as a Professor of Political Economy at Smith College from 1897 - 1902, then as an Adjuct Professor of Political Economy at Columbia University, and then as a full professor at Columbia from 1906 to his requested retirement in 1929.

== Academic Work ==
Moore's early interest in the history of economic theory, beginning with his dissertation, would be followed by a second essay on Antoine Augustin Cournot, whose Sourvenirs he would attempt to publish in English in 1905.

Moore would spend the next decade pursuing a course of study in mathematics in order to pursue statistical economics, which would culminate in the 1911 publication of the Laws of Wages. In the introduction to this work, he highlighted three developments which would enable statistical approaches to theoretical economics: the achievement of a "definite, mathematically symbolic form" for economic theory; the "increasing abundance" of economic data; and the development of correlation estimation.

Contemporary reviews near unanimously praised Moore's first book, with appreciation voiced by F.W. Taussig, Joseph Schumpeter, and Francis Ysidro Edgeworth. Alfred Marshall, notably, refused to read it, writing in response to Moore's request for an interview:

I will be frank. I have had your book on Laws of Wages in a prominent place near my writing chair ever since it arrived, intending to read it when opportunity came. It has not come; and I fear it never will come. For what dips I have made into the book made me believe that it proceeds on lines which I deliberately decided not to follow many years ago; even before mathematics had ceased to be a familiar language to me.

— George Stigler, Essays in the History of Economics, 1965, 352

Moore's next work, Economic Cycles, would attempt to link agricultural economic cycles to cycles in rainfall. Using records from data for three weather stations in Ohio with multiple decades of data near the grain belt, he estimated an 8 year cycle for rainfall and a positively-sloped demand curve for pig iron, eliciting a more subdued reception.

In 1917 Moore published his most successful work, Forecasting the Yield and Price of Cotton, where he contrasted the accuracy of the Department of Agriculture's crop forecasts to his own approach using data on temperature and rainfall in preceding months. His method demonstrated a smaller unexplained variance than official predictions. The same year, he was elected as a Fellow of the American Statistical Association.

Between 1919 and 1921, culminating in his 1923 In Generating Economic Cycles, Moore returned to his interest in cycle theory. Here, he related economic cycles to the movements of the planets. Stigler notes his diminished interest in this topic following a skeptical reception, with no mention of the subject after 1930. Worth noting is this work's resemblance to the sunspot research of William Stanley Jevons.

The most important contributions to economic science Moore made were in statistical estimations of economic functions. Here his use of data for agricultural products was contemporary with pioneering work by agricultural economists in the 1920s such as Holbrook Working, Fred Waugh, Bradford Smith, Sewall Wright, Chelcie Bosland, and others.

In 1919, Moore proposed the term "flexibility of prices" to refer to the reciprocal of elasticity of demand. Stigler credits this as his last significant contribution to statistical economics.

Moore's last book, Synthetic Economics, was published in 1929. It aimed to provide a statistical counterpart to Walras's general equilibrium theory.

Moore's final work, an analysis of the structure of "progressive democracy" attempted during his two decades of retirement, would go unpublished at his request.

== Illness and Death ==
Moore suffered lifelong illness, which as early as 1898 prompted him to negotiate for reduced teaching duties. He died in a Baltimore hospital in 1958, aged 89.

== Legacy ==
With his contemporaries, Wesley Mitchell and Irving Fisher, H. L. Moore pioneered new kinds of quantitative economics in the United States. At the end of his essay on Moore, Stigler writes "In general one can say that Moore was as much a founder of this movement [statistical economics] as any one man is likely to be a founder of a great movement toward which a science has been steadily moving."

== Personal life ==
Moore married Jane Armstrong Schaefer of Richmond, Virginia, on June 16, 1897.

George Stigler describes Moore as "an extremely nervous and sensitive man," and "extraordinarily sensitive to criticism, possessive of his own priorities, and quick to read disparagement in the words of others."

When Mitchell, for example, wrote (from Washington) a complimentary letter on Economic Cycles, but asked for the privilege of discussing certain points, Moore firmly declined the request on the ground that any such discussion would cost him many sleepless nights.

— George Stigler, Essays in the History of Economics, 1965, 346

== Works ==
- Laws of Wages: An Essay in Statistical Economics, 1911.
- Economic Cycles: Their Law and Cause, 1914.
- Forecasting the Yield and Price of Cotton, 1917.
- Generating Economic Cycles, 1923.
- Synthetic Economics, 1929

There is a full bibliography in Stigler's article below.
