= Price Theory (Milton Friedman) =

Economics book by Milton Friedman

Price Theory: A Provisional Text
- Author: Milton Friedman
- Language: English
- Publisher: Aldine Publishing Company
- Publication date: 1962
- Pages: 285

Price Theory: A Provisional Text is an economics book by Milton Friedman.

== Background ==
Milton Friedman had a significant impact on graduate education in economics at the University of Chicago. He played a role in shaping the Chicago tradition in price theory, which began with Frank Knight and Jacob Viner in the 1920s and 1930s. This tradition has been spread globally by numerous students and scholars, including Friedman himself, as well as other notable economists from Chicago such as George Stigler, Gary Becker, and Ronald Coase.

Friedman studied mathematics and economics at Rutgers University before pursuing graduate studies at the University of Chicago and later Columbia University. He received his Ph.D. from Columbia in 1946 and held various appointments outside academia during the period from 1935 to 1946. Friedman joined the faculty at the University of Chicago in 1946, where he taught price theory classes.

Despite being known for his work in macroeconomics and monetarism, Friedman's teaching helped solidify the Chicago tradition in price theory. Price theory was a significant aspect of his legacy as a teacher, and he taught the subject from 1946 to 1964 and again from 1972 to 1976. Notable economists who took Friedman's price theory course include James M. Buchanan, Gary Becker, and Robert Lucas Jr., all of whom later became Nobel laureates.

== Summary ==
Friedman's book Price Theory: A Provisional Text, originally based on lecture notes taken by David I. Fand and Warren J. Gustus in 1951–52. These notes were popular among graduate students and eventually prompted Friedman to work on their publication. The revised edition was prepared when Friedman resumed teaching price theory in the early 1970s.

Friedman's approach to price theory emphasized the insights of Alfred Marshall, combining theoretical analysis with real-world applications. This approach, characterized by its simplicity compared to more mathematically complex theories, offered a powerful tool for addressing a wide range of economic problems. Economists such as Robert Lucas and Gary Becker praised Friedman's approach for its broad applicability and impact.

== See also ==
- The Theory of Price
