= Effects of economic integration =

Economics concept

Economic integration involves at least two countries to abolish customs tariffs on inner border between the states. This causes a number of effects, while the phenomenon itself has specific properties for its successful development.

== Reallocation of labor and capital ==
Economic integration leads to reallocation of the factors (labor and capital) which move towards their better exploitation. Labor moves to area of higher wages (global labor arbitrage, human capital flight), while capital - to area with higher returns (capital outflow). It was found that the pair of the value added of sectors and labor disperse within a region in the same way as heat or gas in a space. Domestic saving rates in the member states of economically integrated region strive to the one and same magnitude, described by the coherence policy of economic blocks. At the same time, practical observation shows that this phenomenon is taking place before formal creation of economic unions.

Formulation of economic integration theory has been initiated by Jacob Viner who described trade creation and trade diversion effects caused by economic integration. They actually mean a change in direction of interregional trade flows respectively caused by the change of tariffs within and outside economic union. The dynamics of trade creation and diversion effects was mathematically described by R.T.Dalimov. The finding shows that trade flow (an output moving from region to region) may be described by Navier-Stoxes equation, with the goods flow caused by the price difference - quite similar to gas or liquid moving under pressure difference.

== Economic growth and productivity ==
Economic integration of states leads to the creation of the terms of trade. Economic union of states obtains more privileged position in trade negotiations.

Economic integration benefits (growth of per capita income and productivity) depend on the level of development as well as a scale of unifying states. For instance, if there are two states being economically integrated, then the larger the size of the economy is, the less it benefits from integration and vice versa (observed empirically). The same principle is observed regarding the level of development of integrating states, although it is not as clear as the firstly mentioned principle. Productivity in the unified area is increased. Remarkably, it is increased more in less developed states, and vice versa (Dalimov, 2008), i.e. according to the principle observed in practice.

== Common markets ==
Among the main benefits for the countries which decided to be unified is a free access to markets of the other member states. Since the stage of the common market, or since supranational bodies of the union are created, specific regional funds are created to reallocate revenues from more developed states to less developed ones. This way development of the member states is equalized, with less developed ones developing faster, leading to an increase of their earnings per capita and thus purchasing more from more developed partner states.

A 2005 article by Harald Badinger estimated that the GDP per capita of the European Union would have been approximately 20% lower if no integration had taken place since 1950.

== Peace ==
Economic integration is thought to be helpful for the avoidance of war. The European Union is often cited as an example of this, as the economic integration of western and central Europe coincided with a period of peace and a reduction in ethno-nationalist sentiment.

== See also ==
- Criticisms of globalization
