= Allyn Abbott Young =

American economist (1876-1929)

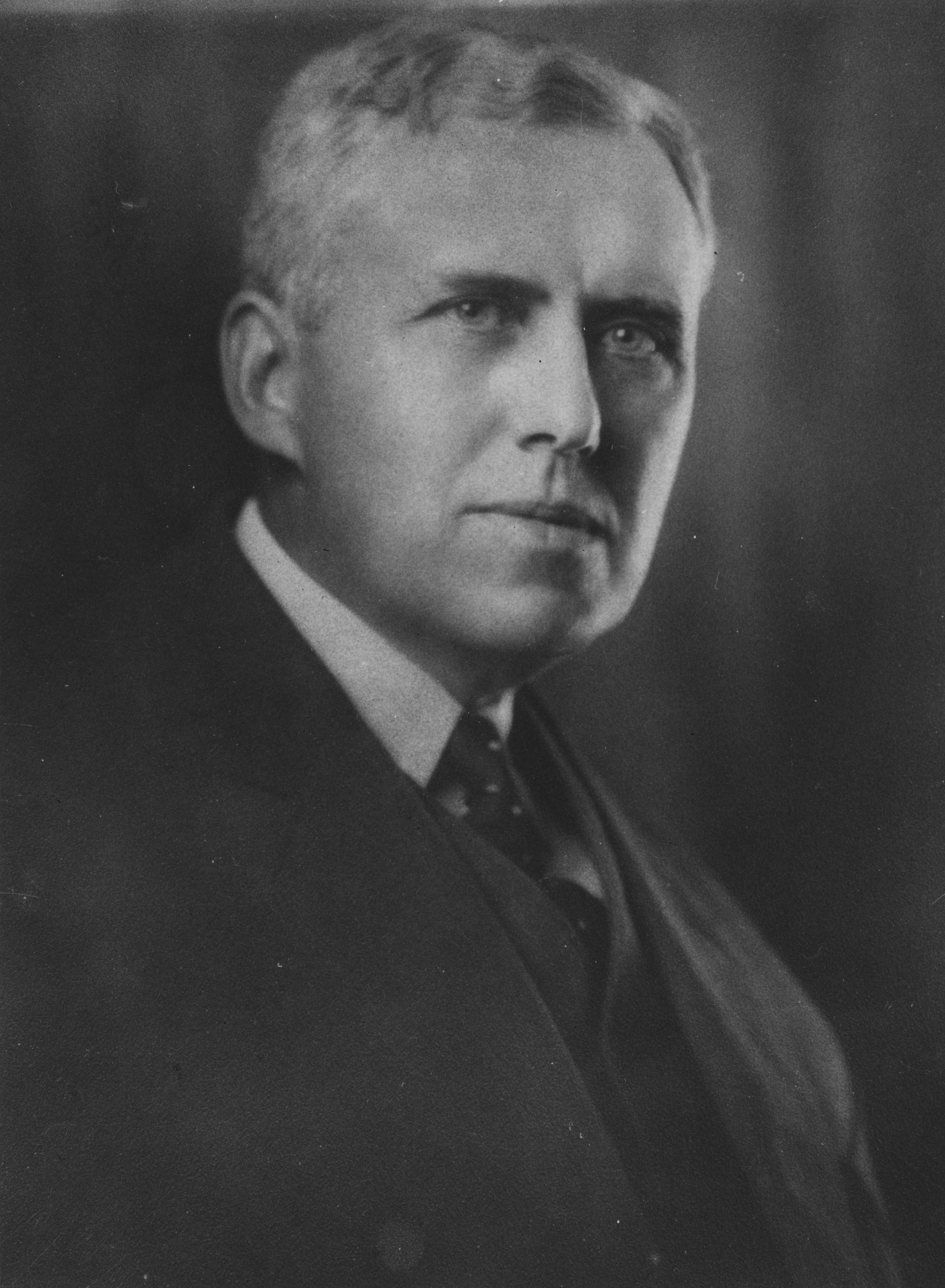
- Born: September 19, 1876; Kenton, Ohio, U.S.
- Died: March 7, 1929 (aged 52); London, England

Academic background
- Education: Hiram College; University of Wisconsin
- Doctoral advisors: Walter F. Willcoxl; Richard T. Ely

Academic work
- Institutions: London School of Economics
- Doctoral students: Frank Knight; Edward Sagendorph Mason; Edward Chamberlin; Nicholas Kaldor

Allyn Abbott Young (September 19, 1876 – March 7, 1929) was an American economist. Over his career, he served as president of the American Statistical Association in 1917 and the American Economic Association in 1925, making him one of the few individuals to lead both organizations. In 1929, Young was president of Section F (Economics) of the British Association for the Advancement of Science. He died in London at the age of 52 from pneumonia during an influenza epidemic.

== Life ==
He was born in Kenton, Ohio.

As documented in a 1995 biography by Charles Blitch, Young was a brilliant student, graduating from Hiram College in 1892 at the age of sixteen, the youngest graduate on record. After a few years in the printing trade he enrolled in 1898 in the graduate school of the University of Wisconsin where he studied economics under Richard T. Ely and William A. Scott, history under Charles H. Haskins and Frederick Jackson Turner, and statistics under Edward D. Jones. In 1900 he was engaged for a year as an assistant in the United States Bureau of the Census in Washington, D.C., where he established lifelong friendships with Walter F. Willcox, Wesley C. Mitchell and Thomas S. Adams. He completed his PhD at the University of Wisconsin in 1902.

Young returned to the University of Wisconsin as instructor in Economics for the 1901–02 academic session and graduated there in 1902 with a doctoral dissertation on Age Statistics. He then embarked on what Blitch has called a peripatetic academic career, beginning with posts at Western Reserve University, 1902–04; Dartmouth, 1904–05; and Wisconsin, 1905–06. He was then head of the economics department at Stanford, 1906–10, followed by a year at Harvard as visitor, 1910–11, and two years at Washington University in St Louis, 1911–13. In 1914, he became one of the inaugural Fellows of the American Statistical Association. From 1913 to 1920 he was professor at Cornell University, but war took him to Washington D.C., in 1917 to direct the Bureau of Statistical Research for the War Trade Board, and to New York in 1918 to head the economics division of a group known as "The Enquiry" under Colonel Edward M. House, the group charged with laying the groundwork for the Paris Peace Conference.

After the war, Young moved to Harvard in 1920 where he stayed until 1927 when he accepted William Beveridge's offer of the chair vacated by Edwin Cannan at the London School of Economics. He remained at the LSE for three years before returning to Harvard. In December 1928 he traveled to the University of Chicago to explain in person why he felt unable to accept their invitation to be chairman of their economics department. It was shortly after his return to London that he succumbed to the fateful influenza epidemic. He was 52 years old.

At the time of his death T. E. Gregory, a colleague at the LSE, wrote that Young had recently "begun work on a systematic treatise on economic theory and had resumed the writing of the work upon monetary theory which he had begun at Harvard." He continued:

A passion for thoroughness would drive him on to explore every inch of the field in which he was for the time interested: he was always convinced that economic truth was not the monopoly of a single school or way of thinking, and that the first duty of a teacher and thinker was to see the strong points in every presentation of a point of view. Such an attitude of mind, combined with great personal modesty, made for unsystematic writing: for scattered papers and articles and not for a comprehensive treatise. In many respects he resembled Edgeworth, for whose work he felt a growing admiration; and if Young's work is ever collected, it will be seen that, like Edgeworth's, it amounts in sum to a very considerable and impressive achievement.

In 1971, Nobel Laureate Bertil Ohlin, who attended a course of Young's at Harvard in 1922–23, wrote to Young's biographer:

I am inclined to believe that he was a man, who knew and thoroughly understood his subject—economics—better than anyone else I have met. I tested him by means of a question about the "Wicksell effect", i.e. the special aspects of the marginal productivity of capital, which at that time was practically unknown in most countries outside of Scandinavia. He immediately gave a fine account in a five minutes speech before the students. What characterizes Allyn Young as an economist was that he had deep understanding of all fields of economic theory while other economists knew well one third of the theory and had only superficial knowledge of the rest.

Much of his writing was published anonymously and posthumously in encyclopedias, but rescued from oblivion in a volume edited by Perry Mehrling and Roger Sandilands (1999). His best-known single paper was his presidential address to the British Association in September 1928 on "Increasing returns and economic progress". Nicholas Kaldor insisted that this paper had been neglected because it was 50 years ahead of his time, but it has recently enjoyed a revival of interest as an acknowledged forerunner of modern "endogenous growth theory".

Paul Samuelson named Young (along with Harry Gunnison Brown, Wesley Clair Mitchell, Henry Ludwell Moore, Frank Knight, Jacob Viner, and Henry Schultz) as one of the several "American saints in economics" born after 1860.

== Bibliography ==
- Collections of Young's papers are in the Hiram College archives and in the Harvard University Archive.
- Charles Blitch, Allyn Young: The Peripatetic Economist, Macmillan, 1995. A book-length treatment of Young's work. Review extract, Economic Journal, 1997.
- Perry G Mehrling and Roger J Sandilands (eds.), Money and Growth: Selected Papers of Allyn Abbott Young, Routledge, 1999, including a comprehensive bibliography. Scroll to article-preview links.
