= Henry Schultz =

American economist and statistician

- Born: Henry Schultz; September 4, 1893; Sharkawshchyna, Russian Empire (now Belarus)
- Died: November 26, 1938 (aged 45); San Diego, California, US
- Education: College of the City of New York; Columbia University; London School of Economics; University College London
- Spouse: Bertha Greenstein
- Scientific career
- Fields: Econometrics
- Workplaces: United States Census Bureau; United States Department of Labor; University of Chicago
- Doctoral advisor: Henry L. Moore
- Doctoral students: Herbert A. Simon; Theodore O. Yntema; H. Gregg Lewis

Henry Schultz (September 4, 1893 – November 26, 1938) was an American economist, statistician, and one of the founders of econometrics. Paul Samuelson named Schultz (along with Harry Gunnison Brown, Allyn Abbott Young, Henry Ludwell Moore, Frank Knight, Jacob Viner, and Wesley Clair Mitchell) as one of the several "American saints in economics" born after 1860.

== Life ==
Henry Schultz was born on September 4, 1893, in a Polish Jewish family in Sharkawshchyna, in the Russian Empire (now part of Belarus). " Schultz's family - father, mother (Rebecca Kissin) with their 2 sons - Henry and his brother Joseph moved to New York City in the United States. Henry Schultz completed his primary education, as well as undergraduate studies at the College of the City of New York, receiving a BA in 1916. For graduate work, Henry Schultz enrolled at Columbia University, but had to interrupt studies in 1917 because of World War I. After the war he received a scholarship which enabled him to spend 1919 at the London School of Economics and the Galton Laboratory of University College London, where he had the opportunity to attend Karl Pearson's lectures on statistics.

After returning to the US, in 1920 Schultz married to Bertha Greenstein. In the future years, the couple had two daughters, Ruth and Jean. Schultz continued studying for his doctoral degree at Columbia, while at the same time conducting statistical work for the War Trade Board, the United States Census Bureau and the United States Department of Labor. He was awarded a PhD in economics from Columbia in 1925 with a thesis entitled Estimation of Demand Curves, written under the supervision of Henry L. Moore.

In 1926, Schultz went to the University of Chicago, where he spent the rest of his career teaching and doing research. In 1930, he was one of the sixteen founding members of the Econometric Society.

Henry Schultz died on November 26, 1938, near San Diego, California, in a car accident that also killed his wife and his two daughters.

== Work ==
Led by his belief that economics needs rigorous quantitative study to become a science, Henry Schultz was one of the founders of mathematical and statistical economics. His research was centered around a large program dedicated to the theory and estimation of private demand for goods functions, a project which started in the early 1920s, during his studies at the University of Chicago, and was completed shortly before his death with the publication of his book, The Theory and Measurement of Demand.

=== Selected publications ===
- Schultz, Henry (1925). "The Statistical Law of Demand as Illustrated by the Demand for Sugar". Journal of Political Economy. XXXIII (5): 481–504. doi:10.1086/253706. S2CID 199882230. and XXXIII (6): 577–637. (PhD thesis)
- Schultz, Henry (1928). Statistical Laws of Demand and Supply with Special Application to Sugar. University of Chicago Press, Chicago. OCLC 1936159.
- Schultz, Henry (1930). The Meaning of Statistical Demand Curves. University of Chicago.
- Schultz, Henry (1938). The Theory and Measurement of Demand. University of Chicago Press, Chicago.

== Influences and legacy ==
Schultz was the doctoral thesis advisor for several students at Chicago, notably 1978 Nobel Prize in Economics winner Herbert A. Simon and future Cowles Commission director Theodore O. Yntema. Schultz also influenced Milton Friedman, who was his student and, for a year, his research assistant.

Schultz started a mathematical economics school at the University of Chicago which, after his death, was in danger to disappear. This prompted the university to invite the Cowles Commission, which had a research agenda focused on empirical economics, to move its headquarters there. As a result, the Commission moved to the University of Chicago in 1939 and Theodore O. Yntema, one of Schultz's students, was named as its new president.

His namesake professorship at the University of Chicago, the Henry Schultz Distinguished Service Professor in Economics, is held by Nobel Laureate James Heckman.

== See also ==
- Henry Ludwell Moore

== Notes and references ==
=== References ===
- Paul H. Douglas (1939). "Henry Schultz as Colleague". Econometrica. 7 (2). Econometrica, Vol. 7, No. 2: 104–106. doi:10.2307/1906834. JSTOR 1906834.
- Harold Hotelling (1939). "The Work of Henry Schultz". Econometrica. 7 (2). Econometrica, Vol. 7, No. 2: 97–103. doi:10.2307/1906833. JSTOR 1906833.
- Theodore O. Yntema (1939). "Henry Schultz: His Contributions to Economics and Statistics". The Journal of Political Economy. 47 (2): 153–162. doi:10.1086/255358. S2CID 153781641.
