= Reference date =

Reference date may mean:

- Reference date (United States business cycles)
- See Epoch (reference date) for information on dates used as reference points for calendars and time standards
