= Melchior Palyi =

Hungarian economist (1892–1970)

Melchior Palyi FBA
- Born: March 14, 1892; Budapest, Hungary, Austria-Hungary
- Died: 28 July 1970 (aged 78); Chicago, Illinois, U.S.

Academic work
- School or tradition: Neoclassical economics

Melchior Palyi (14 March 1892 – 28 July 1970) was a Hungarian-American economist.

== Life ==
=== Early life ===
Melchior Palyi was born in Budapest, Hungary on 14 March 1892.

=== Education ===
Palyi obtained a master's degree in law from University of Budapest. He received his doctorate in Economics from the Ludwig-Maximilians-Universität München in 1915.

=== Career ===
From 1915 to 1918, Palyi worked for the Austro-Hungarian Bank and the Hungarian Ministry of Agriculture. From 1918 to 1933, he taught at the Ludwig-Maximilians-Universität München, the University of Göttingen and Kiel University. After Max Weber's death in 1920, Palyi and Siegmund Hellmann edited and collected student notes of Weber's last complete lecture series – entitled the General Economic History – into a volume that was published in 1923. Palyi was a visiting professor at the universities of Oxford, California in Los Angeles, and Chicago between 1926 and 1928. In 1928, he became an economist at the Deutsche Bank and advised the Reichsbank beginning in 1931. Both positions ended in 1933. Until 1931, Palyi was also a Professor of Finance at the Graduate School of Commerce in Berlin. After the Nazi seizure of power, Palyi immigrated to the United Kingdom and resumed lecturing at Oxford, before returning to the United States and resuming his position as a visiting professor in Chicago between 1933 and 1937. Three years after leaving the University of Chicago, he was a lecturer at Northwestern University. Between 1961 and 1968, Palyi wrote business columns for the Chicago Tribune. He then wrote for the Commercial & Financial Chronicle for the next two years. Palyi died on 28 July 1970 at Billings Memorial Hospital in Chicago.

== Bibliography ==
- Weber, Max (1923). Hellmann, Siegmund; Palyi, Melchior (eds.). Wirtschaftsgeschichte Abriß der universalen Sozial- und Wirtschaftsgeschichte. Aus den nachgelassenen Vorlesungen. München und Leipzig: Duncker & Humblot – via Internet Archive.
- Compulsory Medical Care and the Welfare State
- Managed Money at the Crossroads
- An Inflation Primer
- The Twilight of Gold

== See also ==
- Welfare definition of economics

== General and cited sources ==
- "Dr. Melchior Palyi, Economist, 78, Dies". The New York Times. 31 July 1970. ISSN 0362-4331. Archived from the original on 27 March 2024.
- "Guide to the Melchior Palyi Papers 1915–1970". University of Chicago. 2009. Archived from the original on 1 December 2024.
- Kaesler, Dirk (2014). Max Weber. Preuße, Denker, Muttersohn. Eine Biographie (in German) (First ed.). Munich: C. H. Beck. ISBN 978-3-406-66076-4. JSTOR j.ctv1168mt4. OCLC 878146290. S2CID 170890977.
- Samuels, Warren (2005). "Melchior Palyi: Introduction and Biography". Documents from F. Taylor Ostrander. Research in the History of Economic Thought and Methodology. Vol. 23. Bingley: Emerald Publishing. pp. 305–306. doi:10.1016/s0743-4154(05)23108-5. ISBN 978-0-7623-1165-1. OCLC 76065872.
- Weber, Max (2023). Tribe, Keith (ed.). General Economic History. Routledge Classics. Translated by Knight, Frank; Tribe, Keith (First ed.). Abingdon-on-Thames: Routledge. doi:10.4324/9781003411857. ISBN 978-1-003-41185-7. OCLC 1393524164. S2CID 260858809.
- Zweig, Jason (6 November 2010). "The Intelligent Investor: Melchior Palyi, the Man Who Called the Financial Crisis—70 Years Early". Wall Street Journal. ISSN 0099-9660. Archived from the original on 7 June 2023.
