= Herbert J. Davenport =

American economist (1861–1931)

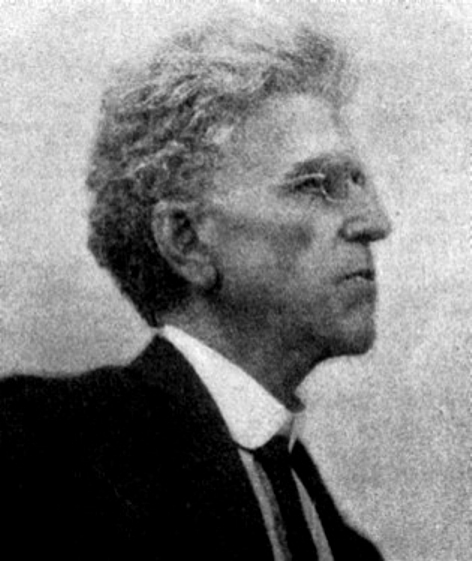
- Born: 10 August 1861; Wilmington, Vermont, U.S.
- Died: 15 June 1931 (age 69); New York City, U.S.

Academic background
- Education: University of Chicago (PhD)
- Doctoral advisor: Thorstein Veblen; James Laurence Laughlin
- Influences: Veblen; Fetter

Academic work
- School or tradition: American Psychological School; Austrian School
- Institutions: University of Chicago; University of Missouri

Herbert Joseph Davenport (August 10, 1861 – June 15, 1931) was an American economist, educator and author. He was a member of the American Psychological School alongside Frank A. Fetter and Thorstein Veblen.

== Biography ==
Born in Wilmington, Vermont, Davenport was the son of Charles N. Davenport, a prominent attorney and Democratic Party leader. He studied at the University of Chicago for a year or so under Thorstein Veblen, with whom he formed a lifelong friendship. His studies were apparently motivated, like many other revolutionary political economists of his time, by a desire to find the flaws in socialism.

Following his degree at Chicago on 1898, Davenport became a high school principal before returning to Chicago as a faculty member. He began his formal career as assistant professor at the University of Chicago in 1902. During his previous 41 years, he had attended Harvard Law School, the University of Leipzig, Ecole Libre des Sciences Politiques in Paris, the University of South Dakota, and the University of Chicago. He moved to the University of Missouri to become department head and first dean of the College of Business in 1908. In 1916, he transferred to Cornell, where he finished his academic career. He also made and lost a fortune in business, largely in land speculation.

The Herbert J. Davenport Society is the University of Missouri College of Business's alumni organization. He died on June 15 1931 at age 69.

== Work ==
=== General ===
An admirer of Thorstein Veblen, Davenport carved a unique niche in the world of academic economics, avoiding the Institutionalist approach inspired by Veblen, and incorporating insights from the Austrian and Lausanne economists. For Davenport, the entrepreneur was central to market activity. He accepted the Austrian concept of opportunity cost (found in the work of Friedrich von Wieser) but rejected the neoclassical conception of marginal utility. He was a relentless critic of Alfred Marshall, his last book being a critique of The Economics of Alfred Marshall (1935). In that book, he criticized Marshall as a classical economist who subscribed to the real cost doctrine and his assumption of homogeneity of different costs.

Davenport, along with Frank A. Fetter, comprised, as Fetter put it, a distinct, if small, school of economics: the American Psychological School. Frank Knight, a student and admirer of Davenport's, did not succeed in imprinting many of Davenport's ideas onto the Chicago School neoclassical tradition.

=== Scholarly works ===
Davenport wrote numerous articles which were published in such prestigious economic journals as the Journal of Political Economy, the Quarterly Journal of Economics and the American Economic Review.

He also wrote several major books. His first article, written while an undergraduate in South Dakota, was "The Formula of Sacrifice" (1894), an exploration of the concept of subjective opportunity cost. Viewed in retrospect, his "Outlines of Economic Theory" was a preliminary version of his 1908 Value and Distribution (1908). The latter was a full-fledged critical examination of the major economic doctrines of classical and early neoclassical thought. Among other things, it contained critiques of marginal utility, of the contemporary Austrian theories of capital and cost, and of Frank Fetter's theory of market interest.

While he had a penchant for criticizing the emerging neoclassical economics, most of his criticism was leveled at vestiges of classical economics, such as the doctrine of real cost and the tripartite division of factors of production, which had led some classical economists to advocate a tax on land value. Although one biographer and student saw him as a reformer (Homan), another lamented the absence of real reformist ideas and even of the awareness of the need to follow criticism with clear statements about what was right and how it could be achieved (Frank Knight). His relentless criticism is probably the main reason that his works have, in general, been neglected by historians of economic thought.

The extensive citations and treatment of economic others ideas in this book were omitted in his later book The Economics of Enterprise (1914). This book was a tightly-knit theory of price from the entrepreneur point of view (to be contrasted with the "social" point of view). In that book, he worked out an image of economic interaction in which all phenomena was interpreted through the eyes and minds of entrepreneurs. This theory was complemented by a theory of credit and money for the era of free enterprise in banking ("loan fund theory of capital").

== Reception ==
As a teacher, he was an artist. "He never lectured in any conservative way. He pitted his students against one another. He subjected them to grilling cross-examination capped by the decisive point and apt illustration, punctuated by satirical amusement toward the inept and the unprepared." Perhaps the best reflection on Davenport as a person comes from the fact that for many years, he used his savings to pay friends in South Dakota who had made real estate investments through him in the early 1890s.

== Selected publications ==
- Davenport, Herbert J., Outlines of Economic Theory, New York: Macmillan, 1896.
- Davenport, Herbert J., Outlines of Elementary Economic Theory, 1898.
- Davenport, Herbert J., Value and Distribution, Chicago: University of Chicago Press, 1908
- Davenport, Herbert J., Capitalization and market value, paper 1910.
- Davenport, Herbert J., Economics of Enterprise, New York: Macmillan, 1913
- Davenport, Herbert J., The Economics of Alfred Marshall. Ithaca, New York: Cornell University Press, 1935

Articles, a selection:

- Davenport, Herbert J. (1894) "The Formula of Sacrifice." Journal of Political Economy. 2 (September): 561–573
- Davenport, Herbert J., 1902, "Proposed Modifications in Austrian Theory and Terminology." Quarterly Journal of Economics, May
- Davenport, Herbert J., 1904, "Capital as a Competitive Concept," Journal of Political Economy, December
- Davenport, Herbert J., 1905, "Doctrinal Tendencies: Fetter, Flux, Seager and Carver," Yale Review, November
- Davenport, Herbert J., "Social Productivity Versus Private Acquisitions", Quarterly Journal of Economics, November, 1910
