= The Theory of Price =

Book by George Stigler

- Title page for The Theory of Price (1946)
- Author: George Stigler
- Language: English
- Genre: Non-fiction
- Publication date: 1946

The Theory of Price is a book written by George Stigler. The book was first published in 1946, as a revision and expansion of The Theory of Competitive Price (1942), and has since been revised and reprinted several times (1942, 1946, 1952, 1966, and 1987). The book covers a range of topics related to microeconomics. Stigler's book was an advanced economics textbook originally intended for graduate students. Over time, it evolved and became The Theory of Price, expanding its scope and becoming a standard text at the undergraduate level. Stigler's work transitioned from the influence of Alfred Marshall and the inter-war School of economics to the post-WWII Chicago School, showing a shift towards greater analytical rigor and the use of mathematics. Throughout its editions, Stigler emphasized precision and positive theory.

According to Ronald Coase, while it's a challenging yet valuable resource for aspiring economists, the textbook isn't where Stigler’s most innovative economic contributions are found, which explains why it wasn't a focus when he received the Nobel Prize. Although engaging and witty, the book covers conventional topics expected in price theory, not groundbreaking work.

== Table of Contents ==
Fourth Edition, 1987

1. Introduction to Economic Analysis
2. Prices and the Enterprise Economy
3. Consumer Behavior
4. The Theory of Utility
5. Pricing with Limited Supplies
6. The Supplies of Productive Services
7. Costs and Production
8. Production: Diminishing Returns
9. Production: Returns to Scale
10. Additional Topics in Production and Costs
11. The General Theory of Competitive Prices
12. The Theory of Monopoly
13. Oligopoly, Cartels, and Mergers
14. The Economics of Information
15. The Demand for Productive Services
16. Rents and Quasi-Rents
17. Wage Theory
18. The Size Distribution of Income
19. Capital and Interest
20. The Economy and the State
- Appendix A. Fundamental Quantitative Relationships
- Appendix B. Mathematical Notes
- Index

== See also ==
- Price Theory (Milton Friedman)
