= Frank H. Hankins =

American sociologist (1877–1970)

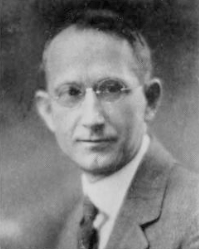
- Born: September 27, 1877; Willshire, Ohio, US
- Died: January 23, 1970 (aged 92); New York, New York, US
- Education: Columbia University
- Scientific career
- Fields: Sociology
- Workplaces: Clark University
- Thesis: Adolphe Quetelet as Statistician (1908)
- Doctoral advisor: Henry Ludwell Moore
- Doctoral students: Melvin M. Knight

Frank Hamilton Hankins (September 27, 1877 – January 23, 1970) was an American sociologist and anthropologist who was the president of the American Sociological Society in 1938. He wrote the book The Racial Basis of Civilization (1926) which was critical of notions of racial superiority and racial theories such as Aryanism, Gobinism, Celticism, Anglo-Saxonism and Nordicism – such as "adulation of the blond dolichocephal as the embodiment of all that was great in creative genius, organizing ability and power of leadership."

In 1933 he was one of signers of the Humanist Manifesto.

He died in New York City on January 23, 1970.

== Works ==
- Adolphe Quetelet as Statistician (1908)
- The Racial Basis of Civilization: A Critique of the Nordic Doctrine (1926)
- An Introduction to the Study of Society: An Outline of Primary Factors and Fundamental Institutions (1928)
- Reminiscences of Frank Hamilton Hankins (1968)
