= Free trade agreement =

Bi- or multi-lateral treaty

A free trade agreement (FTA) or treaty is an agreement according to international law to form a free-trade area between the cooperating states. There are two types of trade agreements: bilateral and multilateral. Bilateral trade agreements occur when two countries agree to loosen trade restrictions between the two of them, generally to expand business opportunities. Multilateral trade agreements are agreements among three or more countries, and are the most difficult to negotiate and agree.

FTAs, a form of trade pacts, determine the tariffs and duties that countries impose on imports and exports with the goal of reducing or eliminating trade barriers, thus encouraging international trade. Such agreements usually "center on a chapter providing for preferential tariff treatment", but they also often "include clauses on trade facilitation and rule-making in areas such as investment, intellectual property, government procurement, technical standards and sanitary and phytosanitary issues".

Important distinctions exist between customs unions and free-trade areas. Both types of trading bloc have internal arrangements which parties conclude in order to liberalize and facilitate trade among themselves. The crucial difference between customs unions and free-trade areas is their approach to third parties. While a customs union requires all parties to establish and maintain identical external tariffs with regard to trade with non-parties, parties to a free-trade area are not subject to such a requirement. Instead, they may establish and maintain whatever tariff regime applying to imports from non-parties as they deem necessary. In a free-trade area without harmonized external tariffs, to eliminate the risk of trade deflection, parties will adopt a system of preferential rules of origin.

The General Agreement on Tariffs and Trade (GATT 1994) originally defined free-trade agreements to include only trade in goods. An agreement with a similar purpose, i.e., to enhance liberalization of trade in services, is named under Article V of the General Agreement on Trade in Service (GATS) as an "economic integration agreement". However, in practice, the term is now widely used in politic science, diplomacy and economics to refer to agreements covering not only goods but also services and even investment. Environmental provisions have also become increasingly common in international investment agreements, like FTAs.

== History ==
The OED records the use of the phrase "free trade agreement" with reference to the Australian colonies as early as 1877. After the WTO's World Trade Organization - which has been considered by some as a failure for not promoting trade talks, but a success by others for preventing trade wars - states increasingly started exploring options to conclude FTAs.

=== Development of free trade agreements ===
Modern trade diplomacy began to take shape with the 1860 Cobden–Chevalier Treaty signed by Great Britain and France. By introducing the "most-favored-nation" clause, this agreement served as a template for subsequent liberal trade policies across Europe until the resurgence of protectionist measures in the early 1900s.

Following World War II, the global trade landscape shifted toward multilateralism with the establishment of the General Agreement on Tariffs and Trade (GATT) in 1947. While the GATT aimed to reduce tariffs globally, it also provided a legal framework under Article XXIV for nations to form smaller, more integrated regional trade blocs.

The final decade of the 20th century saw a dramatic acceleration in regional trade integration. Key milestones included the 1993 formalization of the European Union (EU) and the 1994 launch of the North American Free Trade Agreement (NAFTA).

== Legal aspects of free trade agreements ==
The formation of free trade areas is considered an exception to the most favored nation (MFN) principle in the World Trade Organization (WTO) because the preferences that parties to a free-trade area exclusively grant each other go beyond their accession commitments. Although Article XXIV of the GATT allows WTO members to establish free-trade areas or to adopt interim agreements necessary for the establishment thereof, there are several conditions with respect to free-trade areas, or interim agreements leading to the formation of free-trade areas.

Firstly, duties and other regulations maintained in each of the signatory parties to a free-trade area, which are applicable at the time such free-trade area is formed, to the trade with non-parties to such free-trade area shall not be higher or more restrictive than the corresponding duties and other regulations existing in the same signatory parties prior to the formation of the free-trade area. In other words, the establishment of a free-trade area to grant preferential treatment among its member is legitimate under WTO law, but the parties to a free-trade area are not permitted to treat non-parties less favorably than before the area is established. A second requirement stipulated by Article XXIV is that tariffs and other barriers to trade must be eliminated to substantially all the trade within the free-trade area.

Free trade agreements forming free-trade areas generally lie outside the realm of the multilateral trading system. However, WTO members must notify to the Secretariat when they conclude new free trade agreements and in principle the texts of free trade agreements are subject to review under the Committee on Regional Trade Agreements. Although a dispute arising within free-trade areas are not subject to litigation at the WTO's Dispute Settlement Body, "there is no guarantee that WTO panels will abide by them and decline to exercise jurisdiction in a given case".

A free trade agreement is a reciprocal agreement, which is allowed by Article XXIV of the GATT. Whereas, autonomous trade arrangements in favor of developing and least developed countries are permitted by the Decision on Differential and More Favorable Treatment, Reciprocity and Fuller Participation of Developing Countries adopted by signatories to the General Agreement on Tariffs and Trade (GATT) in 1979 (the “Enabling Clause”). It is the WTO's legal basis for the Generalized System of Preferences (GSP). Both free trade agreements and preferential trade arrangements (as named by the WTO) are considered as derogation to the MFN principle.

== Economic aspects of free trade agreements ==
=== Trade diversion and trade creation ===
In general, trade diversion means that an FTA would divert trade away from more efficient suppliers outside the area towards less efficient ones within the areas. Whereas, trade creation implies that an FTA area creates trade which may not have otherwise existed. In all cases trade creation will raise a country's national welfare.

Both trade creation and trade diversion are crucial effects found upon the establishment of an FTA. Trade creation will cause consumption to shift from a high-cost producer to a low-cost one, and trade will thus expand. In contrast, trade diversion will lead to trade shifting from a lower-cost producer outside the area to a higher-cost one inside the FTA. Such a shift will not benefit consumers within the FTA as they are deprived the opportunity to purchase cheaper imported goods. However, economists find that trade diversion does not always harm aggregate national welfare: it can even improve aggregate national welfare if the volume of diverted trade is small.

=== FTAs as public goods ===
Economists have made attempts to evaluate the extent to which FTAs can be considered public goods. They first address one key element of FTAs, which is the system of embedded tribunals which act as arbitrators in international trade disputes. These serve as a force of clarification for existing statutes and international economic policies as affirmed in the trade treaties.

The second way in which FTAs are considered public goods is tied to the evolving trend of them becoming “deeper”. The depth of an FTA refers to the added types of structural policies that it covers. While older trade deals are deemed “shallower” as they cover fewer areas (such as tariffs and quotas), more recently concluded agreements address a number of other fields, from services to e-commerce and data localization. Since transactions among parties to an FTA are relatively cheaper as compared to those with non-parties, FTAs are conventionally found to be excludable. Now that deep trade deals will enhance regulatory harmonization and increase trade flows with non-parties, thus reducing the excludability of FTA benefits, new generation FTAs are obtaining the essential characteristics of public goods.

== Qualifying for preferences under an FTA ==
Unlike a customs union, parties to an FTA do not maintain common external tariffs, which means they apply different customs duties, as well as other policies with respect to non-members. This feature creates the possibility of non-parties may free-riding preferences under an FTA by penetrating the market with the lowest external tariffs. Such risk necessitates the introduction of rules to determine originating goods eligible for preferences under an FTA, a need that does not arise upon the formation of a customs union. Basically, there is a requirement for a minimum extent of processing that results in "substantial transformation" to the goods so that they can be considered originating. By defining which goods are originating in the PTA, preferential rules of origin distinguish between originating and non-originating goods: only the former will be entitled to preferential tariffs scheduled by the FTA, the latter must pay MFN import duties.

It is noted that in qualifying for origin criteria, there is a differential treatment between inputs originating within and outside an FTA. Normally inputs originating in one FTA party will be considered as originating in the other party if they are incorporated in the manufacturing process in that other party. Sometimes, production costs arising in one party is also considered as that arising in another party. In preferential rules of origin, such differential treatment is normally provided for in the cumulation or accumulation provision. Such clause further explains the trade creation and trade diversion effects of an FTA mentioned above, because a party to an FTA has the incentive to use inputs originating in another party so that their products may qualify for originating status.

== Databases on FTAs ==
The database on trade agreements provided by ITC's Market Access Map. Since there are hundreds of FTAs currently in force and being negotiated (about 800 according to ITC's Rules of Origin Facilitator, counting also non-reciprocal trade arrangements), it is important for businesses and policy-makers to keep track of their status. There are a number of depositories of free trade agreements available either at national, regional or international levels. Some significant ones include the database on Latin American free trade agreements constructed by the Latin American Integration Association (ALADI), the database maintained by the Asian Regional Integration Center (ARIC) providing information agreements of Asian countries, and the portal on the European Union's free trade negotiations and agreements.

At the international level, there are two important free-access databases developed by international organizations for policy-makers and businesses:

=== WTO's Regional Trade Agreements Information System ===
As WTO members are obliged to notify to the Secretariat their free trade agreements, this database is constructed based on the most official source of information on free trade agreements (referred to as regional trade agreements in the WTO language). The database allows users to seek information on trade agreements notified to the WTO by country or by topic (goods, services or goods and services). This database provides users with an updated list of all agreements in force, however, those not notified to the WTO may be missing. It also displays reports, tables and graphs containing statistics on these agreements, and particularly preferential tariff analysis.

=== ITC's Market Access Map ===
The Market Access Map was developed by the International Trade Centre (ITC) with the objectives to facilitate businesses, governments and researchers in market access issues. The database, visible via the online tool Market Access Map, includes information on tariff and non-tariff barriers in all active trade agreements, not limited to those officially notified to the WTO. It also documents data on non-preferential trade agreements (for instance, Generalized System of Preferences schemes). Up until 2019, Market Access Map has provided downloadable links to texts agreements and their rules of origin. The new version of Market Access Map forthcoming this year will provide direct web links to relevant agreement pages and connect itself to other ITC's tools, particularly the Rules of Origin Facilitator. It is expected to become a versatile tool which assists enterprises in understanding free trade agreements and qualifying for origin requirements under these agreements.

== See also ==
- Free trade
- List of bilateral free-trade agreements
- List of multilateral free-trade agreements
- Trade agreement
