= Stigler diet =

Optimization problem

The Stigler diet is an optimization problem named for George Stigler, a 1982 Nobel laureate in economics, who posed the following problem:

For a moderately active man weighing 154 pounds, how much of each of 77 foods should be eaten on a daily basis so that the man’s intake of nine nutrients will be at least equal to the recommended dietary allowances (RDAs) suggested by the National Research Council in 1943, with the cost of the diet being minimal?

The nutrient RDAs required to be met in Stigler's experiment were calories, protein, calcium, iron, as well as vitamins A, B_{1}, B_{2}, B_{3}, and C. The result was an annual budget allocated to foods such as evaporated milk, cabbage, dried navy beans, and beef liver at a cost of approximately $0.11 a day in 1939 U.S. dollars.

While the name "Stigler Diet" was applied after the experiment by outsiders, according to Stigler, "No one recommends these diets for anyone, let alone everyone." The Stigler diet has been much ridiculed for its lack of variety and palatability; however, his methodology has received praise and is considered to be some of the earliest work in linear programming.

== Linear programming problem ==
The Stigler diet question is a linear programming problem. Lacking any sophisticated method of solving such a problem, Stigler was forced to utilize heuristic methods in order to find a solution. The diet question originally asked in what quantities a 154-pound (70 kg) male would have to consume 77 different foods in order to fulfill the recommended intake of 9 different nutrients while keeping expenses at a minimum. Through "trial and error, mathematical insight and agility," Stigler was able to eliminate 62 of the foods from the original 77 (these foods were removed because they lacked nutrients in comparison to the remaining 15). From the reduced list, Stigler calculated the required amounts of each of the remaining 15 foods to arrive at a cost-minimizing solution to his question. According to Stigler's calculations, the annual cost of his solution was $39.93 in 1939 dollars (equivalent to $924 in 2025, or $2 per day, slightly under the international poverty line as housing, clothing and fuel are also needed to live). The specific combination of foods and quantities is as follows:

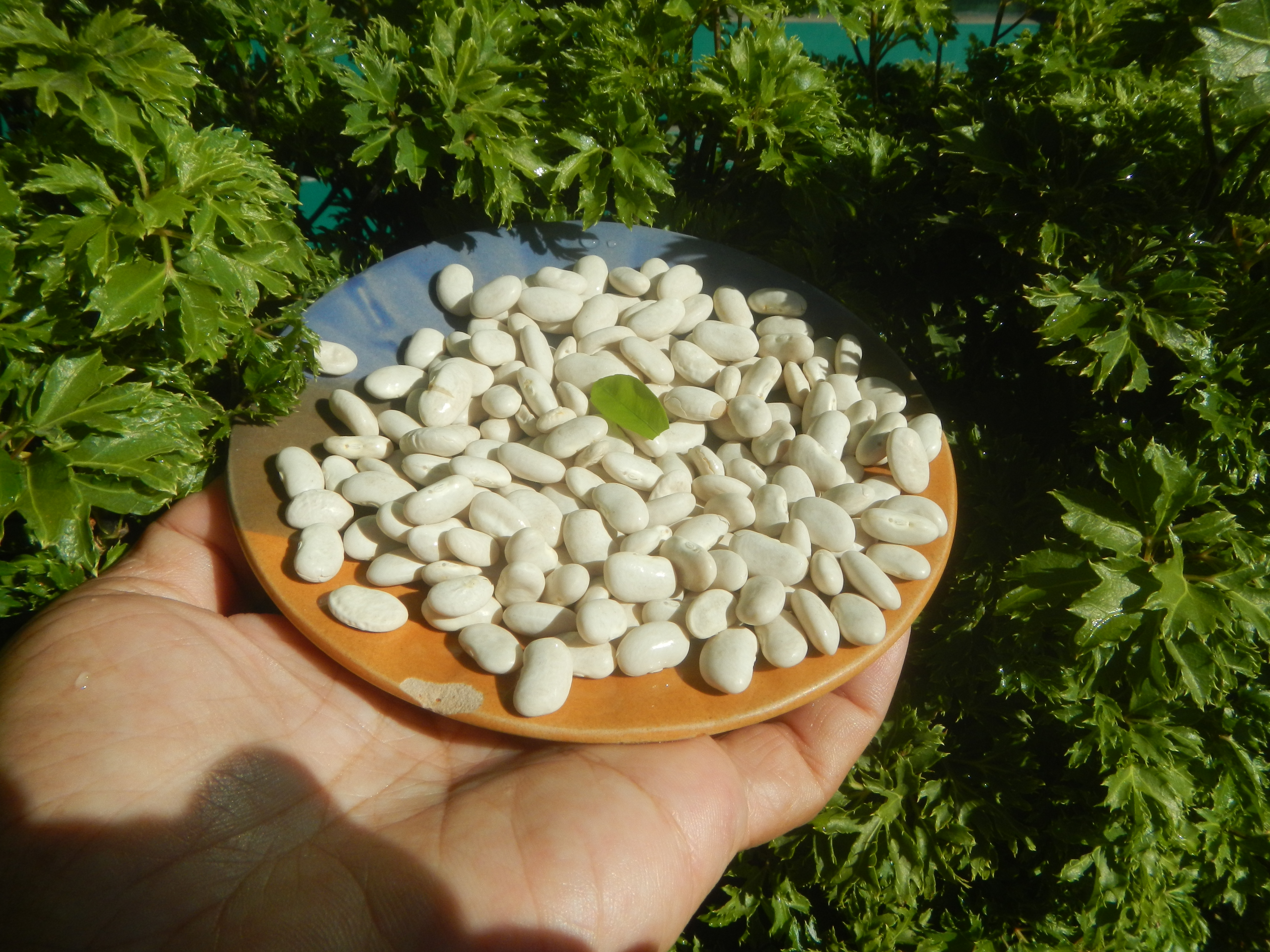
The Stigler diet calls for the annual consumption of 285 pounds of navy beans.

Stigler's 1939 Diet
Food	Annual Quantities	Annual Cost
Wheat Flour	370 lb (170 kg)	$13.33
Evaporated Milk	57 cans	$3.84
Cabbage	111 lb (50 kg)	$4.11
Spinach	23 lb (10 kg)	$1.85
Dried Navy Beans	285 lb (129 kg)	$16.80
Total Annual Cost		$39.93

The 9 nutrients that Stigler's diet took into consideration and their respective recommended daily amounts were:

Table of nutrients considered in Stigler's diet
Nutrient	Daily Recommended Intake
Calories	3,000 Calories
Protein	70 grams
Calcium	.8 grams
Iron	12 milligrams
Vitamin A	5,000 IU
Thiamine (Vitamin B_{1})	1.8 milligrams
Riboflavin (Vitamin B_{2})	2.7 milligrams
Niacin	18 milligrams
Ascorbic Acid (Vitamin C)	75 milligrams

Seven years after Stigler made his initial estimates, the development of George Dantzig's simplex algorithm made it possible to solve the problem without relying on heuristic methods. The exact value was determined to be $39.69 (using the original 1939 data). Dantzig's algorithm describes a method of traversing the vertices of a polytope of N+1 dimensions in order to find the optimal solution to a specific situation.

In 2014, Google chef Anthony Marco devised a recipe using a similar list of ingredients (with calf liver in place of evaporated milk), called "Foie Linéaire à la Stigler"; one Google employee described it as "delicious".
