= Elizabeth Read Brown =

American librarian and economist (1902–1987)

- Born: Elizabeth Read; April 8, 1902; Michigan, U.S.
- Died: February 10, 1987 (aged 84)
- Spouse(s): Harry Gunnison Brown (m. 1950s; d. 1975)

Academic background
- Education: Michigan State Normal College; Western Reserve University; University of Michigan (MA, library science)

Academic work
- Discipline: Public finance, Land value taxation
- School or tradition: Georgism

Elizabeth Read Brown (née Read; April 8, 1902 – February 10, 1987) was an American librarian and economist who wrote on land value taxation and tax reform. After a career as a university and public librarian, she published some twenty articles in the American Journal of Economics and Sociology, joining its editorial board in 1977. She was married to economist Henry George, who believed that economic rent derived from land—including from natural resources and the commons—should be shared equally among all members of society. She shared his beliefs, as reflected in her published papers, most of which argued for assessing property tax on land value rather than buildings, and in her campaigns for local tax reform in Pennsylvania and Missouri.

== Selected works ==
- (with Harry Gunnison Brown) "Plant Location and Community Tax Policy". American Journal of Economics and Sociology 14 (1), October 1954: 55–57.
- "Tax Policy: Its Effects on Housing and Slums". American Journal of Economics and Sociology 16 (3), April 1957: 327–328.
- (with Harry Gunnison Brown) The Effective Answer to Communism. New York: Robert Schalkenbach Foundation, 1958.
- "Zoning Objectives and Tax Policy". American Journal of Economics and Sociology 18 (1), October 1958: 55–56.
- "Growing Urban Obsolescence and Tax Policy". American Journal of Economics and Sociology 19 (1), October 1959: 96–98.
- "How College Textbooks Treat Land Value Taxation". American Journal of Economics and Sociology 20 (2), January 1961: 147–167.
