= Geoffrey H. Moore =

American economist

Geoffrey Moore
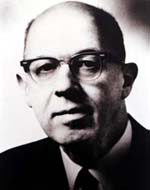

Commissioner of Labor Statistics
- In office March 1969–January 1973
- President: Richard Nixon
- Preceded by: Ben Burdestky (Acting)
- Succeeded by: Ben Burdetsky (Acting)

Personal details
- Born: February 28, 1914; Rochester, New York
- Died: March 9, 2000 (aged 86); Bloomfield, Connecticut
- Education: Harvard University; University of California

Geoffrey Hoyt Moore (February 28, 1914 – March 9, 2000), whom The Wall Street Journal called "the father of leading indicators", spent several decades working on business cycles at the National Bureau of Economic Research, where he helped build on the work of his mentors, Wesley Clair Mitchell and Arthur F. Burns. Moore also served as commissioner of the Bureau of Labor Statistics from March 1969 to January 1973.

In 1946 Moore was teaching statistics at New York University and one of his students was Alan Greenspan, later chairman of the Federal Reserve, who would tell The New York Times that Moore was "a major force in economic statistics and business-cycle research for more than a half-century." In 1956 he was elected as a Fellow of the American Statistical Association. In 1996 Moore founded the Economic Cycle Research Institute in New York City.
