= Reference date (United States business cycles) =

The reference dates of the United States' business cycles are determined by the Business Cycle Dating Committee of the National Bureau of Economic Research (NBER), which looks at various coincident indicators such as real GDP, real personal income, employment, and sales to make informative judgments on when to set the historical dates of the peaks and troughs of past business cycles. The NBER was founded in 1920, and the first business cycle dates published in 1929.

The Economic Cycle Research Institute (ECRI), founded by Geoffrey H. Moore, who created the first index of leading economic indicators (LEI) in 1967, also determines historical international business cycle dates comparable to the NBER’s U.S. business cycle chronology.

== See also ==
- Economic Cycle Research Institute
