= Economic Cycle Research Institute =

US think tank

- Nickname: ECRI
- Predecessor: Center for International Business Cycle Research (CIBCR)
- Formation: 1996; 30 years ago
- Founders: Geoffrey H. Moore, Anirvan Banerji, and Lakshman Achuthan
- Headquarters: 500 5th Avenue
- Location: New York City, United States
- Coordinates: 40.75391°N 73.98102°W
- Origins: the National Bureau of Economic Research (NBER)
- Key people: Anirvan Banerji and Lakshman Achuthan (co-founders), Melinda Hubman and Dimitra Visviki (managing director)
- Website: www.businesscycle.com

The Economic Cycle Research Institute (ECRI) based in New York City, is an independent institute formed in 1996 by Geoffrey H. Moore, Anirvan Banerji, and Lakshman Achuthan. It provides economic modeling, proprietary leading indicators, financial databases, economic forecasting, and commercial cycle risk management services to investment managers, business executives, and government policymakers.

== Purpose ==
ECRI's stated mission is to preserve and advance the tradition of business cycle research established by Moore at the National Bureau of Economic Research (NBER) and the Center for International Business Cycle Research (CIBCR). In contrast to the NBER, ECRI sells cycle risk management services to the business community. It provides economic modeling, financial databases, economic forecasting, and market cycles services to investment managers, business executives, and government policymakers.

== International business cycle chronologies ==
Before there was a Business Cycle Dating Committee to determine U.S. business cycle dates, Moore determined them on the NBER's behalf from 1949 to 1978, and then served as the committee's senior member until he died in 2000. Using the same approach, ECRI has long determined recession start and end dates for over 20 other countries that are widely accepted by academics and major central banks as the definitive international business cycle chronologies.

== History ==
ECRI today represents a third generation of cycle research, building on the work of ECRI's co-founder, Geoffrey H. Moore, and his mentors, Wesley C. Mitchell and Arthur F. Burns.

In 1920, Wesley C. Mitchell and his colleagues established the National Bureau of Economic Research (NBER), with a primary objective of investigating business cycles. In 1927, Mitchell laid down the standard definition of business cycles: "Business cycles are a type of fluctuation found in the aggregate economic activity of nations that organize their work mainly in business enterprises: a cycle consists of expansions occurring at about the same time in many economic activities, followed by similarly general recessions, contractions, and revivals which merge into the expansion phase of the next cycle; this sequence of changes is recurrent but not periodic; in duration business cycles vary from more than one year to ten or twelve years; they are not divisible into shorter cycles of similar character with amplitudes approximating their own."

In 1929, with the start of the Great Depression, business cycle researchers had a practical emergency on their hands. With the economy back in recession, in the summer of 1937, U.S. Treasury Secretary Henry Morgenthau Jr. requested Mitchell "to draw up a list of statistical series that would best indicate when the recession would come to an end." In 1938, Mitchell and Arthur F. Burns identified the first leading indicators of revival. Also in 1938, Geoffrey H. Moore joined Mitchell and Burns at the NBER.

In 1946, Moore taught Alan Greenspan, who served as Chairman of the Federal Reserve of the United States from 1987 to 2006, In 1950, Moore developed the first-ever leading indicators of cyclical revival and recession. In 1958 to 1967, Moore, working with Julius Shiskin, developed the original composite index method, and the composite indexes of leading, coincident, and lagging indicators of the U.S. economy. In 1968, Moore gave over to the U.S. government the original composite leading, coincident, and lagging indexes, which the United States Department of Commerce adopted (and published regularly in Business Cycle Developments (BCD), soon renamed Business Conditions Digest), with the Index of Leading Economic Indicators (LEI) becoming its main forecasting gauge. In 1969, Moore was appointed U.S. Commissioner of Labor Statistics, and took a four-year leave from the NBER. While Commissioner, he started the collection of additional statistics, including the Employment Cost Index. In 1973, Moore and Philip A. Klein began developing international leading indexes.

In 1979, having retired from the NBER, Moore established the Center for International Business Cycle Research (CIBCR) at Rutgers University, moving it four years later to Columbia University.

In February 1994, following a surprise rate hike, Chairman Greenspan testified in Congress that "anything that Geoffrey Moore does I follow closely," to which a Congressman replies, "No kidding." In 1995, Moore received the American Economic Association's Distinguished Fellow Award.

In 1996, Moore, with his protégés, Lakshman Achuthan and Anirvan Banerji, established the independent Economic Cycle Research Institute (ECRI), which virtually all of their CIBCR colleagues then joined.

== ECRI's approach ==
Many economists claim that recessions cannot be predicted. A 63-country study of economists' predictions conducted by the International Monetary Fund concluded that their "record of failure to predict recessions is virtually unblemished."

However, The Economist noted in 2005 that "ECRI is perhaps the only organisation to give advance warning of each of the past three recessions; just as impressive, it has never issued a false alarm." In May 2011, Business Insider reported "The Economic Cycle Research Institute (ERCI) ... have been quite accurate in forecasting business cycle in recent years ...."

== Recession and recovery calls ==
2001 recession call:

In March 2001, ECRI made a U.S. recession call and in April 2001 ECRI's Achuthan told The Wall Street Journal that "the economy has passed the point of no return, beyond which it is not possible to shift away from the recession track."

2007-09 recession and recovery calls:

In January 2008, it said Weekly Leading Index growth "has now dropped to a new six-year low. Even so, it is still possible for prompt policy action to help avert a recession".

In March 2008, "the Economic Cycle Research Institute made its official call, stating that the U.S. economy had "unambiguously" entered a recession."

In April 2009 ECRI said "The longest U.S. recession in more than a half-century will probably end before the summer is out."

2011-12 recession forecast:

In September 2011, ECRI forecast a U.S. recession that never happened. Growth did slow sharply and was "about as weak as it could be without falling into recession." ECRI "had predicted that the final six months of 2012 would register contraction. The first estimate of GDP growth came in at 1 ½% (that is, at an annual rate of 1 ½%). The fifth revision to that initial estimate, unveiled in July, pushed down the measured rate of growth to a quarter of 1%, about as close to shrinkage as a positive growth figure can be."

2015:

In October 2015, ECRI titled its international cyclical outlook "Broader Global Slowdown Ahead". Specifically, ECRI predicted the "progressively poorer global growth" that materialized in early 2016.

2020 recession and recovery calls:

On March 17, 2020, with U.S. states about to issue stay-at-home orders, ECRI wrote that "cascading closures across the economy will necessarily cause a breakdown in demand." The result would be "mandated demand destruction, which is likely to railroad the economy into a contraction. A recession is increasingly unavoidable". But on April 3, 2020, ECRI wrote that "this recession will be extremely deep, very broad, but relatively brief," as "shutdowns start ebbing" in short order. Then, on June 24, 2020, ECRI wrote that its leading indexes "have been signaling the start of an economic recovery for some time now." Noting that stock prices had always turned up "ahead of the business cycle trough," they concluded: "In light of this historical pattern, coupled with the sequential upturns in our leading indexes, it's logical that the S&P 500 would turn up when it did, in late March".

== Publicly available data ==
- The U.S. Weekly Leading Index (WLI) of economic activity.
- The U.S. Coincident Index (USCI) is a broad measure of current economic activity.
- International business cycle chronologies for 21 economies.
