= James Laurence Laughlin =

American economist and professor

J. Laurence Laughlin
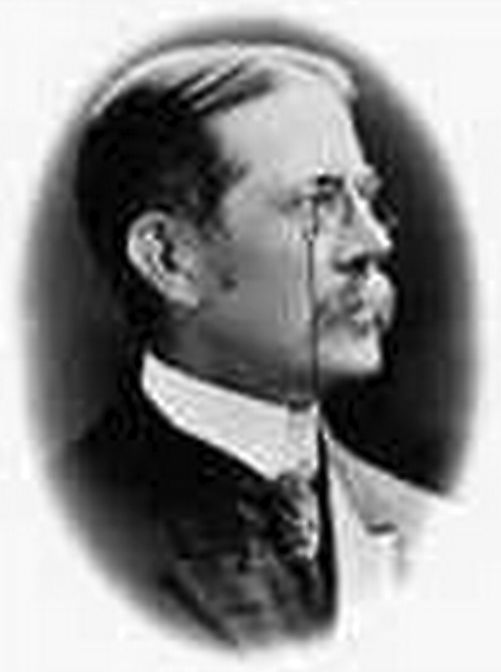
- Born: April 2, 1850; Deerfield, Ohio, U.S.
- Died: November 28, 1933 (aged 83); Jaffrey, New Hampshire, U.S.

Academic background
- Education: Harvard University

Academic work
- Institutions: Harvard University; Cornell University; University of Chicago
- Notable ideas: American economist

James Laurence Laughlin (April 2, 1850 – November 28, 1933) was an American economist and professor at Cornell University, Harvard University, and the University of Chicago, who helped to found the Federal Reserve System and was "one of the most ardent defenders of the gold standard."

== Biography ==
Laughlin was born in Deerfield, Ohio on April 2, 1850. He received a Ph.D. from Harvard University in history. His thesis regarded "Anglo-Saxon Legal Procedure" and was supervised by Henry Adams. The other members of his program were Henry Cabot Lodge and Ernest Young.

A conservative, he generally subscribed to the economic theories of John Stuart Mill and opposed bimetallism.

Laughlin taught at Harvard University in Boston for five years, at Cornell University for two years, and then became the department-head of the new economics department at the University of Chicago from 1892 to 1916. Notably, he appointed many economists with whom he avidly disagreed, such as Thorstein Veblen, to high positions at the university.

Laughlin was a member of the Indianapolis Monetary Commission, organized in 1897, and prepared its report, one of the important documents in the history of American banking and monetary reform. The presidential election of 1896 and the economic turmoil surrounding it spurred the writing of the 600-page report. This report advocated for the maintenance of a decentralized approach to the banking system, an approach which proposed that banks issue their own notes backed by loans to factories, merchants and farmers. In this way, the amount of currency in circulation would automatically expand or contract with business, in contrast to the then existing system where notes were issued based on the procurement of government bonds. This real bills theory was in line with the aversion to centralized banking of the era, and is considered to be naive from a modern view.

In 1906 Laughlin lectured, by invitation, in Berlin, and in 1909 he served as delegate to the Pan-American Scientific Congress at Santiago, Chile. From 1911 to 1913 he was chairman of the Executive Committee of the National Citizens League for the Promotion of a Sound Banking System. Under his leadership the league promoted banking reform in the United States.

In addition to teaching, he edited the Journal of Political Economy from 1892 to 1933, but refused to become a member of the American Economic Association because of differences in philosophy. He advised various state and national governments on economic matters, including overhauling the monetary system of Santo Domingo. He prepared an abridgment of John Stuart Mill's Political Economy (1884) and wrote many important books on macroeconomics and monetary policy.

He died at his home in Jaffrey, New Hampshire on November 28, 1933.

== Reception ==
One of Laughlin's students at the University of Chicago was the American economist Wesley Clair Mitchell (1874–1948), who recalled:

Professor Laughlin's indubitable success as a teacher puzzled many who did not pass through his classroom. He was not an original thinker of great power. He did not enrich economics. He did not even keep abreast of current developments in economic theory. He had a prim and tidy mind, which he kept in perfect order by admitting nothing that did not harmonize with the furnishings installed in the 1880s. Yet he held that a teacher's aim should be "the acquisition of independent power and methods of work, rather than specific beliefs.

According to Milton Friedman (1987) Laughlin's scholarly work "was almost entirely in the field of money and banking." Friedman summarized:

Much of it, notably his History of Bimetallism in the United States (1885), consisted of a thorough and extremely careful presentation of historical evidence on the development of money and monetary institutions. But Laughlin also wrote extensively on monetary and banking theory, and on proposals for monetary reform. His work on these topics was marred by a dogmatic and rigid opposition to the quantity theory of money, an opposition that developed out of his public activities opposing the free silver movement. The proponents of free silver used a crude form of the quantity theory to support their position, which sufficed to render the theory anathema to Laughlin.

And furthermore:

Laughlin's attack on the quantity theory had much in common with recent cost-push or structural or supply-shock theories of inflation, in emphasizing the role of factors affecting specific goods and services rather than general monetary influences. Then, as now, such theories ran against the major stream of monetary analysis as exemplified in Laughlin's time by the work of Irving Fisher. As a result, his writings on theory have had no lasting influence on economic thought.

== Selected publication ==
- The Study of Political Economy (1885)
- History of Bimetallism in the United States (1886)
- Elements of Political Economy (1887; revised edition, 1902, 1915)
- Facts about Money (1895)
- Credit (1902)
- Principles of Money (1903)
- Reciprocity (1903), with H. P. Willis
- Lectures on Commerce (1904)
- Industrial America (1906)
- Latter Day Problems (1909)
- Banking Reform (1912)
- Money and Prices (1919)
- Banking Progress (1920)
- The Federal Reserve Act: Its Origin and Problems (1933)
