= Thomas Sewall Adams =

American economist (1873–1933)

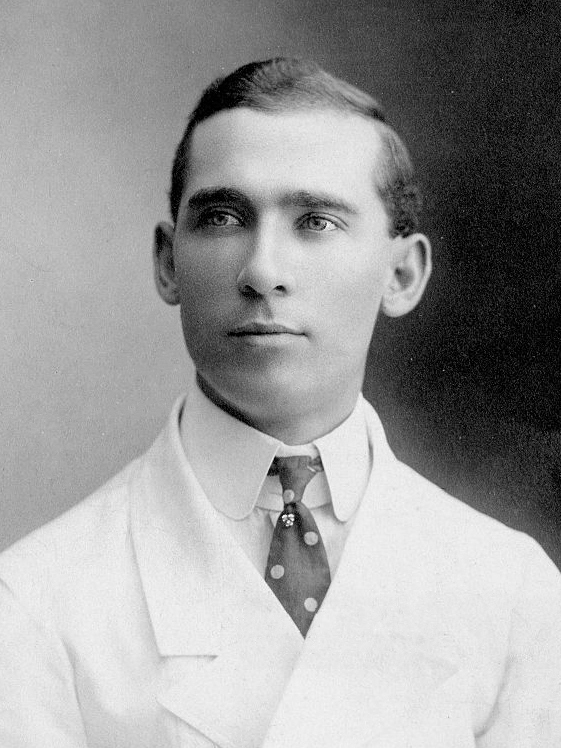
- Adams c. 1899
- Born: December 29, 1873; Baltimore, Maryland
- Died: February 8, 1933 (aged 59); New Haven, Connecticut
- Occupations: economist, educator

Thomas Sewall Adams (December 29, 1873 – February 8, 1933) was an American economist who was Professor of Political Economy at Yale University. He was advisor to the U.S. Treasury Department, and a key architect of the post-WWI fiscal state in the United States.

== Biography ==
Born in Baltimore, Maryland, Adams graduated from Baltimore City College in 1893 and subsequently enrolled in Johns Hopkins University, where he received his BA in 1896 and his PhD in 1899. In 1899, Adams was appointed assistant to the Treasurer of Puerto Rico. He served in that capacity for one year, before joining the faculty of University of Wisconsin–Madison as an associate professor of political economy in 1901. He was elevated to a full professor in 1908.

Between 1911 and 1915, Adams served on the Wisconsin tax commissioner and drafted many of that state's tax laws. In 1916, he was appointed to the faculty of Yale University, where he served as a professor until his death in 1933. An economic adviser to the U. S. Treasury (1917–1933), he is credited with much of the taxation policy of the World War I and post-war period. He was president of the National Tax Association (1922–1923), American Economic Association (1927), and member of the fiscal committee, League of Nations (1929–1933).

== Publications ==
Adams authored many books on economics and taxation policy, including

- 1900. Taxation in Maryland.
- 1905. Labor Problems. with H. L. Sumner.
- 1907. Mortgage Taxation in Wisconsin and Neighboring States.
- 1908. Outlines in Economics. with Richard T. Ely
- 1923. Manual of Charting. Prentice-Hall
