= Jacob Viner =

Canadian economist (1892–1970)

- Born: May 3, 1892; Montreal, Quebec, Canada
- Died: September 12, 1970 (aged 78); Princeton, New Jersey, US

Academic background
- Education: McGill University; Harvard University
- Doctoral advisor: F. W. Taussig
- Influences: Frank Knight

Academic work
- Discipline: Economics
- School or tradition: Chicago school of economics
- Institutions: University of Chicago; Princeton University
- Doctoral students: Philip W. Bell; Bernard Brodie; George Hay Brown; Roland Wilson; Donald Winch; Paul Wonnacott
- Notable ideas: Economy/Diseconomy; Ricardo–Viner model; trade creation; trade diversion
- Influenced: Gary Becker; Milton Friedman; Paul Samuelson; George Stigler

Jacob Viner (Note: Pronounced /ˈvaɪnər/.) (3 May 1892 – 12 September 1970) was a Canadian economist and is considered with Frank Knight and Henry Simons to be one of the "inspiring" mentors of the early Chicago school of economics in the 1930s: he was one of the leading figures of the Chicago faculty. Paul Samuelson named Viner (along with Harry Gunnison Brown, Allyn Abbott Young, Henry Ludwell Moore, Frank Knight, Wesley Clair Mitchell, and Henry Schultz) as one of the several "American saints in economics" born after 1860. He was an important figure in the field of political economy.

== Early life ==
Viner was born to a Jewish family on May 3, 1892, in Montreal, Quebec, to Romanian immigrant parents. He earned his undergraduate degree at McGill University in 1914. He received a PhD at Harvard University, where he wrote his dissertation, under the trade economist F. W. Taussig.

== Academic career ==
Viner was a professor at the University of Chicago from 1916 to 1917 and from 1919 to 1946. At various times, Viner also taught at Stanford and Yale Universities and twice at the Graduate Institute of International and Development Studies in Geneva, Switzerland. In 1946 he left for Princeton University, where he remained until his retirement, in 1960. He was also a member of the Institute for Advanced Study in Princeton from 1947 to 1948 and a permanent member there from 1950 to 1970. Viner was elected to the American Academy of Arts and Sciences in 1934. In 1942, he was elected to the American Philosophical Society.

Nobel laureate Milton Friedman studied under Viner while he was at the University of Chicago.

Viner died on September 12, 1970, in Princeton, New Jersey.

== Public service ==
Viner played a role in government, most notably as an advisor to Secretary of the Treasury Henry Morgenthau Jr. during the administration of Franklin Roosevelt. During World War II, he served as co-rapporteur to the economic and financial group of the Council on Foreign Relations' "War and Peace Studies" project, along with Harvard economist Alvin Hansen.

== Work ==
=== Economics ===
Viner was a noted opponent of John Maynard Keynes during the Great Depression. While he agreed with the policies of government spending pushed by Keynes, Viner argued that Keynes's analysis was flawed and would not stand in the long run.

Known for his economic modeling of the firm, including the long- and the short-run cost curves, his work is still used today.

Viner is further known for having added the terms trade creation and trade diversion to the canon of economics in 1950. He also made important contributions to the theory of international trade and to the history of economic thought. While he was at Chicago, Viner co-edited the Journal of Political Economy with Frank Knight.

His work, Studies in the Theory of International Trade (1937), discusses the history of economic thought and is a historical source for the Bullionist controversy in 19th-century Britain.

=== Atomic bomb ===
Viner spoke at the Conference on Atomic Energy Control in 1945, stating "that the atomic bomb was the cheapest way yet devised of killing human beings" and that atomic bombs "will be peacemaking in effect," perhaps making him the founder of nuclear deterrence.

== Major publications ==
- "Some Problems of Logical Method in Political Economy", 1917, JPE
- "Price Policies: the determination of market price", 1921.
- Dumping: A problem in international trade, 1923.
- Canada's Balance of International Indebtedness 1900–1913: An Inductive Study in the Theory of International Trade. Harvard economic studies, v. 26. Cambridge, MA: Harvard University Press. 1924. hdl:2027/uc1.b3871317 – via HathiTrust.
- "The Utility Concept in Value Theory and its Critics", 1925, JPE.
- Viner, Jacob (1927). "Adam Smith and Laissez-Faire". Journal of Political Economy. 35 (2): 198–232. doi:10.1086/253837. JSTOR 1823421. S2CID 154539413.
- Frederick C. Mills; Jacob H. Hollander; Jacob Viner; E.B. Wilson; Wesley C. Mitchell; F.W. Taussig; T.S. Adams; John D. Black; John Candler Cobb (1928). "The Present Status and Future Prospects of Quantitative Economics". American Economic Review. 18 (1): 28–45. JSTOR 1811547.
- "Mills' Behavior of Prices", 1929, QJE
- "Costs Curves and Supply Curves," Zeitschrift für Nationalökonomie, 3, pp. 23–46. Reprinted in R. B. Emmett, ed. 2002, The Chicago Tradition in Economics, 1892–1945, Routledge, v. 6, pp. 192–215.
- "The Doctrine of Comparative Costs", 1932, WWA
- "Inflation as a Possible Remedy for the Depression", 1933, Proceedings of Institute of Public Affairs, Univ. of Georgia
- "Mr. Keynes on the Causes of Unemployment", 1936, QJE.
- Studies in the Theory of International Trade. London: George Allen & Unwin. 1937 – via Internet Archive. via Mises Institute
- "The Short View and the Long in Economic Policy," American Economic Review, 30(1), Part 1 1940, pp. 1–15.
- "Marshall's Economics, in Relation to the Man and to his Times", 1941, AER
- Trade Relations Between Free-Market and Controlled Economies, 1943.
- "International Relations between State-Controlled National Economies", 1944, AER.
- "Prospects for Foreign Trade in the Post-War World", 1946, Manchester Statistical Society.
- "Power Versus Plenty as Objectives of Foreign Policy in the Seventeenth and Eighteenth Centuries", 1948, World Politics
- "Bentham and J.S. Mill: the Utilitarian Background", 1949, AER
- The Customs Union Issue, 1950.
- "A Modest Proposal for Some Stress on Scholarship in Graduate Training", 1950 (reprinted in 1991)
- International Economics, 1951.
- International Trade and Economic Development, 1952.
- "Schumpeter's History of Economic Analysis," American Economic Review, 44(5), 1954, pp. 894–910.
- "'Fashion' in Economic Thought", 1957, Report of 6th Conference of Princeton Graduate Alumni
- "International Trade Theory and its Present-Day Relevance", 1955, Economics and Public Policy
- The Long View and the Short: Studies in Economic Theory, 1958.
- "Stability and Progress: the poorer countries' problem", 1958, in Hague, editor, Stability and Progress in the World Economy
- Five Lectures on Economics and Freedom, 1959 (Wabash Lectures, publ. 1991)
- "The Intellectual History of Laissez-Faire", 1960, J Law Econ
- "Hayek on Freedom and Coercion; Reviewed Work: The Constitution of Liberty by F.A. Hayek". Southern Economic Journal. 27 (3): 230–236. 1960. JSTOR 1055089.
- "Relative Abundance of the Factors and International Trade", 1962, Indian EJ
- "The Necessary and Desirable Range of Discretion to be Allowed to a Monetary Authority", 1962, in Yeager, editor, In Search of a Monetary Constitution
- "'Possessive Individualism' as Original Sin", 1963, Canadian J of Econ & Poli Sci "Possessive Individualism" as Original Sin
- "The Earlier Letters of John Stuart Mill", 1963, Univ of Toronto Quarterly
- "The Economist in History", 1963, American Economic Review, 53(2), pp. 1–22
- "The United States as a Welfare State", 1963, in Higgenbotham, editor, Man, Science, Learning and Education
- Problems of Monetary Control, 1964.
- "Comment on my 1936 Review of Keynes", 1964, in Lekachman, editor, Keynes's General Theory
- "Introduction", in J. Rae, Life of Adam Smith, 1965.
- Sills, David L., ed. (1968). "Smith, Adam". International Encyclopedia of the Social Sciences. Vol. 14. New York: The Macmillan Company & Free Press. pp. 322-329 – via Internet Archive.
- "Mercantilist Thought", 1968, in Sills, editor, International Encyclopedia of Social Sciences
- "Man's Economic Status", 1968, in Clifford, editor, Man Versus Society in Eighteenth-Century Britain.
- "Satire and Economics in the Augustan Age of Satire", 1970, in Miller et al., editors, The Augustan Milieu
- The Role of Providence in the Social Order. 1972 – via Internet Archive.
- Religious Thought and Economic Society: Four Chapters of an Unfinished Work by Jacob Viner, ed. by J. Melitz and D. Winch, History of Poli Econ., 1978.
- Irwin, Douglas A., ed. (1991). Essays on the Intellectual History of Economics. Princeton, NJ: Princeton University Press. ISBN 978-0691042664.

== Notes ==
Professional and academic associations
| Preceded by Alvin Hansen | President of the American Economic Association; 1939 | Succeeded by Frederick C. Mills |
Awards
| Preceded by Frank Knight | Francis A. Walker Medal; 1962 | Succeeded by Alvin Hansen |
