= General Economic History =

Book by Max Weber's students

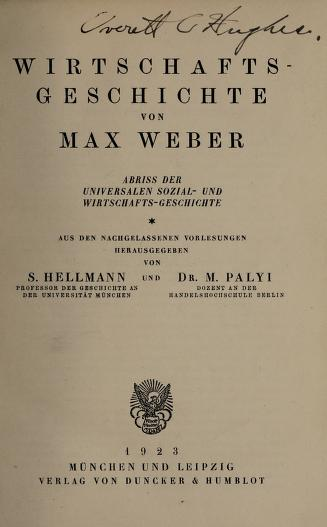
- Title page of the original publication
- Author: Max Weber
- Publication date: 1923

General Economic History (German: Wirtschaftsgeschichte) is a book of economic theory which was composed by Max Weber's students based on notes from his lectures. It is notable for reconstructing and filling the gaps in Weber's theories with the help of his published and unpublished works. It was released in 1923, three years after his death, and was translated into English by Frank H. Knight.

== Economic theory ==
The content of the text covered lecture notes taken from 1919 to 1920 when he taught economic and social history (Abriss der universalen Sozial- und Wirtschaftsgeschichte). His broader view of economics is outlined in the book. He proposed that the field should not only cover economic theory but also economic sociology and economic history. For this position, there are scholars who describe General Economic History as very close to economic sociology. Weber held that economic history faces three challenges: 1) division of labor; 2) economic orientation toward the generation of profit or householding; and 3) the degree to which rationality and irrationality characterize economic life.

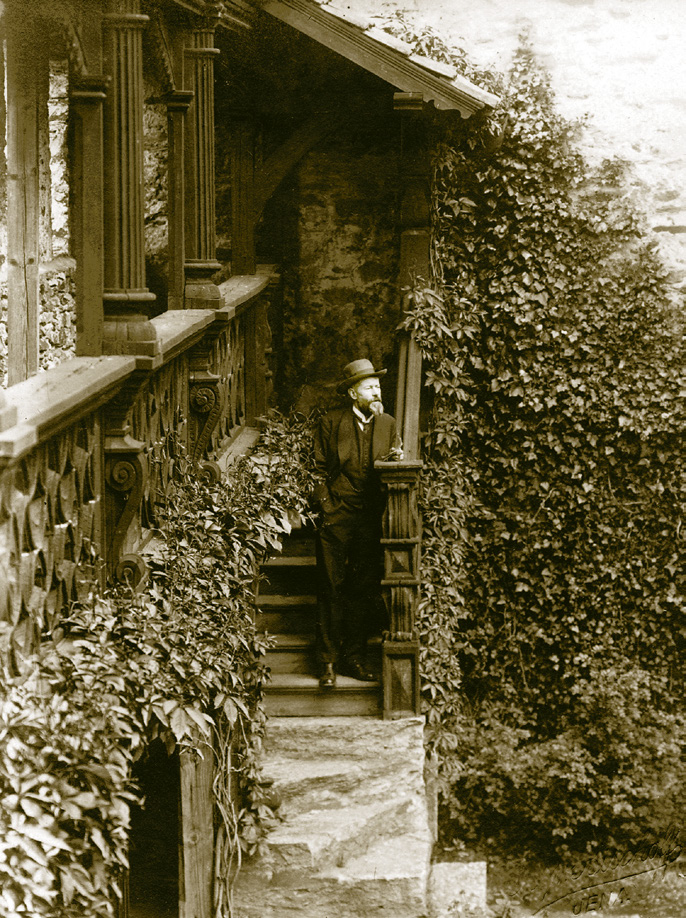
Max Weber in 1917, lecturing at Lauenstein

In the General Economic History, Weber also developed an institutional theory of the rise of capitalism in the West. Unlike in his earlier work, The Protestant Ethic and the Spirit of Capitalism, religion is given a minor role. The emphasis of the work lies instead on the place of the state and calculable law in allowing economic actors to predict exchange for gain. He also refuted claims by thinkers such as Werner Sombart, who held that the Jews were responsible for the rise of Western capitalism. He maintained that Jewish capitalism can be considered pariah capitalism rather than rational capitalism and that the idea of the "Jewish factory owner" is a modern one.

Weber's institutional theory of capitalism was rediscovered in the early 1980s by writers like Randall Collins, Daniel Chirot, and Douglass C. North, who worked to replace theories based largely on Immanuel Wallerstein's "World Systems" theory. Though today read primarily by sociologists and social philosophers, Weber's work did have a significant influence on Frank Knight, one of the founders of the neoclassical Chicago school of economics, who translated Weber's General Economic History into English in 1927.
