= Bradford Smith =

Bradford Smith may refer to:

- Bradford A. Smith (1931–2018), American astronomer
- Brad Smith (American lawyer) (Bradford L. Smith, born 1959), American attorney and technology executive
- Bradford S. Smith (born 1950), American Republican Party politician

== See also ==
- Bradford Smith Building, historic building in New Bedford, Massachusetts
