= George Stigler =

American economist and Nobel Laureate (1911–1991)

- Born: January 17, 1911; Seattle, Washington, U.S.
- Died: December 1, 1991 (aged 80); Chicago, Illinois, U.S.

Academic background
- Education: University of Washington (BA); Northwestern University (MBA); University of Chicago (PhD)
- Doctoral advisor: Frank Knight
- Influences: Jacob Viner, Henry Simons, Milton Friedman

Academic work
- School or tradition: Chicago School of Economics
- Institutions: Columbia University; Brown University; University of Chicago; Iowa State University
- Doctoral students: Jacob Mincer; Thomas Sowell
- Notable ideas: Regulatory capture theory Industrial organization Search unemployment Stigler diet
- Awards: Nobel Memorial Prize in Economic Sciences (1982); National Medal of Science (1987)
- Website: Information at IDEAS / RePEc

George Joseph Stigler (/ˈstɪɡlər/; January 17, 1911 – December 1, 1991) was an American economist. He was the 1982 laureate in Nobel Memorial Prize in Economic Sciences and is considered a key leader of the Chicago school of economics.

== Early life and education ==
Stigler was born in Seattle, Washington, the son of Hungarian Elsie Elizabeth (Erzsébet Hungler, born in Bakonypéterd, Veszprém county, Kingdom of Hungary) and Bavarian Joseph Stigler. He was of German and Hungarian descent and spoke German in his childhood. He graduated from the University of Washington in 1931 with a B.A. and then spent a year at Northwestern University, from which he obtained his MBA in 1932. It was during his studies at Northwestern that Stigler developed an interest in economics and decided on an academic career.

After he received a tuition scholarship from the University of Chicago, Stigler enrolled there in 1933 to study economics and went on to earn his PhD in economics in 1938.

== Career ==
Stigler taught at Iowa State College from 1936 to 1938. He spent much of World War II at Columbia University, conducting mathematical and statistical research for the Manhattan Project. He then spent one year at Brown University. He served on the Columbia faculty from 1947 to 1958.

At Chicago, he was greatly influenced by Frank Knight, his dissertation supervisor. Milton Friedman, a friend for over 50 years, commented that it was remarkable that Stigler had passed his dissertation under Knight, as only three or four students had ever managed to do so during Knight's 28 years at Chicago. Stigler's influences included Jacob Viner and Henry Simons, as well as fellow students W. Allen Wallis and Friedman.

In 1977, Stigler founded the Center for the Study of the Economy and the State as a research center of the Chicago Booth School of Business. Upon Stigler's death in 1991, it was renamed the George J. Stigler Center for the Study of the Economy and the State in his honor.

== Publications ==
Stigler is best known for developing the Economic Theory of Regulation (1971), also known as regulatory capture, which says that interest groups and other political participants will use the regulatory and coercive powers of government to shape laws and regulations in a way that is beneficial to them. This theory is a component of the public choice field of economics but is also deeply opposed by public choice scholars belonging to the "Virginia School," such as Charles Rowley. He also carried out extensive research in the history of economic thought.

Stigler's most important contribution to economics was published in his landmark 1961 article, "The Economics of Information." According to Friedman, Stigler "essentially created a new area of study for economists." Stigler stressed the importance of information: "One should hardly have to tell academicians that information is a valuable resource: knowledge is power. And yet it occupies a slum dwelling in the town of economics." His 1962 article "Information in the Labor Market" developed the theory of search unemployment. In 1963 he was elected as a Fellow of the American Statistical Association.

He was known for his sharp sense of humor, and he wrote a number of spoof essays. In his book The Intellectual and the Marketplace, for instance, he proposed Stigler's Law of Demand and Supply Elasticities: "all demand curves are inelastic and all supply curves are inelastic too." The essay referenced studies that found many goods and services to be inelastic over the long run and offered a supposed theoretical proof; he ended by announcing that his next essay would demonstrate that the price system does not exist. Another essay, "A Sketch on the Truth in Teaching," described the consequences of a (fictional) set of court decisions that held universities legally responsible for the consequences of teaching errors. The Stigler diet is also named after him.

Stigler wrote numerous articles on the history of economics, published in the leading journals and republished 14 of them in 1965. The American Economic Review said, "many of these essays have become such well-known landmarks that no scholar in this field should be unfamiliar with them... The lucid prose, penetrating logic, and wry humor... have become the author's trademarks." However, Deirdre McCloskey has criticized his characterization of Adam Smith as a father of the 'greed is good' school of economics as a poor reading of the Scottish philosopher's views.

Stigler was elected to the American Philosophical Society in 1955, the American Academy of Arts and Sciences in 1959, and the United States National Academy of Sciences in 1975. He received the National Medal of Science in 1987

== Trivia ==
- His great uncle Antal Koppány was famous for achieving a draw against chess champion Bobby Fischer who was himself of Hungarian ancestry through his biological father Paul Neményi.

== Bibliography ==
- (1939). "Production and Distribution in the Long Run," Journal of Political Economy, 47(3), pp. 305–327 (arrow-scrollable).
- ([1941] 1994). Production and Distribution Theories: The Formative Period. New York: Macmillan. & Description arrow-scrollable preview.
- (1942) The Theory of Competitive Price. The Macmillan Company.
- (1945). "The Cost of Subsistence," Journal of Farm Economics, 2, pp. 303–314. Arrow-scrollable.
- Stigler, George J. (1961). "The Economics of Information" (PDF). Journal of Political Economy. 69 (3): 213–225. Archived from the original (PDF) on June 21, 2010.
- (1962a). "Information in the Labor Market." Journal of Political Economy, 70(5), Part 2, pp. 94–105.
- (1962b). The Intellectual and the Marketplace. Selected Papers, no. 3. Chicago: University of Chicago Graduate School of Business. Reprinted in Sigler (1986), pp. 79–88
- (1962c). (With Claire Friedland) "What Can Regulators Regulate," Journal of Law and Economics, pp. 3–21.
- (1962d). "The problem of the Negro," "New Guard" 101(5), pp. 11–12.
- (1963). (With Paul Samuelson) "A Dialogue on the Proper Economic Role of the State." Selected Papers, no. 7. pp. 3–20. Chicago: University of Chicago Graduate School of Business
- (1963). Capital and Rates of Return in Manufacturing Industries. National Bureau of Economic Research, Princeton, NJ: Princeton University Press
- (1965). Essays in the History of Economics. University of Chicago Press. 1965.
- (1968). The Organization of Industry. Description & arrow-scrollable preview. Homewood, IL: Richard D. Irwin
- (1970). (With J.K. Kindahl) The Behavior of Industrial Prices. National Bureau of Economic Research, New York: Columbia University Press
- (1971). "The theory of economic regulation." Bell Journal of Economics and Management Science, 2(1), pp. 3–21. (arrow-scrollable).
- (1972). "The Adoption of Marginal Utility Theory," History of Political Economy, 4(2), pp. 571–586. Also below at * (1982b).
- (1975). Citizen and the State: Essays on Regulation
- (1982a). "The Process and Progress of Economics," Nobel Memorial Lecture, 8 December (with bibliography)
- (1982b). The Economist as Preacher, and Other Essays. Chicago: University of Chicago Press. 1982 – via Internet Archive.
- (1983). The Organization of Industry
- (1985). Memoirs of an Unregulated Economist. University of Chicago Press. 2003. ISBN 978-0226774404 – via Internet Archive. autobiography
- (1986). The Essence of Stigler, K.R. Leube and T.G. Moore, ed. Arrow-scroll to respective essays. ISBN 0817984623
- (1987). The Theory of Price, Fourth Edition. New York: Macmillan
- (1988). ed. Chicago Studies in Political Economy

For comprehensiveness, see Vicky M. Longawa (1993), "George J. Stigler: A Bibliography," Journal of Political Economy, 101(5), pp. 849–862. Arrow–scrollable.

- (2002). Zingales, L. et al. (Eds.), George Stigler 50 Years Later. Stigler Center.

== See also ==
- Milton Friedman
- Regulatory capture
- Stephen Stigler, his son

== Notes ==
Awards
Preceded by James Tobin	Laureate of the Nobel Memorial Prize in Economics; 1982	Succeeded by Gérard Debreu
