= Trade creation =

Economic effect of customs unions

Trade creation is an economic term related to international economics in which trade flows are redirected due to the formation of a free trade area or a customs union. The issue was firstly brought into discussion by Jacob Viner (1950), together with the trade diversion effect.

In the former case after the formation of economic union, the cost of the goods considered is decreased, leading to an increase of efficiency of economic integration. Hence, trade creation's essence is in elimination of customs tariffs on inner border of unifying states (usually already trading with each other), causing further decrease of price of the goods, while there may be a case of new trade flow creation of the goods between the states decided to economically integrate.

The opposite takes place in case of trade diversion, when the trade flow is diverted from actually cost-efficient partner state to less efficient one – but which became a member of economic union and made its goods cheaper within a union, but higher compared to the rest of the world. In practice, both trade creation and diversion effects take place due to formation of economic union. Efficiency of economic integration of specific union right now is assessed as a final outcome between trade creation and diversion effects: it is cost-effective in case of prevailing of the trade creation effects, and vice versa.

== Occurrence of trade creation ==
When a customs union is formed, the member nations establish a free trade area amongst themselves and a common external tariff on non-member nations. As a result, the member nations establish greater trading ties between themselves now that protectionist barriers such as tariffs, import quotas, non-tariff barriers and subsidies have been eliminated. The result is an increase in trade among member nations in the good or service of each nation's comparative advantage. In other words, increase in trade causes greater revenues, (more profitable).

== Downside of trade creation ==
The creation of trade is important to the nation entering the customs union in that increased specialization may hurt other industries. Arguments for protectionism, such as the infant industry argument, national defense, outsourcing, and issues with health and safety regulations are brought to mind. However, customs unions are typically formed with friendly nations, eliminating the national defense argument.

== See also ==
- Trade diversion
