= Trade diversion =

Economic effect of customs unions

Trade diversion is an economic term related to international economics in which trade is diverted from a more efficient exporter towards a less efficient one by the formation of a free trade agreement or a customs union. Total cost of good becomes cheaper when trading within the agreement because of the low tariff. This is as compared to trading with countries outside the agreement with lower cost goods but higher tariff. The related term Trade creation is when the formation of a trade agreement between countries decreases the price of the goods for more consumers, and therefore increases overall trade. In this case the more efficient producer with the agreement increases trade.

The terms were used by 'old' Chicago School economist Jacob Viner in his 1950 paper The Customs Union Issue.

== Notable uses ==
An early use of the terms was by Jacob Viner in his 1950 paper The Customs Union Issue. Later in same decade Richard Lipsey noted that not only the location of production but also the location of consumption of goods would be effected by trade agreements.

Béla Balassa discussed the concepts in relation to the European Common Market in his paper 1967 Trade Creation and Trade Diversion in the European Common Market.

In 2013, Paul Oslington's Contextual History, Practitioner History, and Classic Status: Reading Jacob Viner's The Customs Union Issue reviewed revisited Viner's original paper.

== Occurrence ==
When a country applies the same tariff to all nations, it will always import from the most efficient producer, since the more efficient nation will provide the goods at a lower price. With the establishment of a bilateral or regional free trade agreement, that may not be the case. If the agreement is signed with a less-efficient nation, it may well be that their products become cheaper in the importing market than those from the more-efficient nation, since there are taxes for only one of them. Consequently, after the establishment of the agreement, the importing country would acquire products from a higher-cost producer, instead of the low-cost producer from which it was importing until then. In other words, this would cause a trade diversion.

== Term ==
The term was coined by Jacob Viner in The Customs Union Issue in 1950. In its literal meaning the term was however incomplete, as it failed to capture all welfare effects of discriminatory tariff liberalization, and it was not useful when it came to non-tariff barriers. Economists have however dealt with this incompleteness in two ways. Either they stretched the original meaning to cover all welfare effects, or they introduced new terms like trade expansion or internal versus external trade creation.

Viner's article became and still is the foundation of the theory of international economic integration. It considered only two states comparing their trade flows with the rest of the world after they abolish customs tariffs on inner border of their union. Following the fact that economic unions most often include more than 2 states, attempts have been made to increase the number of the states (3+world), but not so successfully, as they did not have as clear conclusions as Viner's.

Opposite to economically efficient trade creation effect, the trade diversion flow is cost-inefficient compared with the rest of the world. Balance between trade creation and trade diversion effects due to the creation of economic union makes the union either economically efficient (positive balance) or inefficient (negative balance). It is based on the fact that unification of states usually applies mergers of more than 1 sector in economy (even European Coal and Steel Union, which had 2 sectors only) leading to the creation of either trade creation or diversion effects.

Positive effects of trade diversion include increase of trade between unified states, increase of employment in manufacturing states inside the union consequently leading to increase of respective taxes and welfare.

== Downside ==
Diverted trade may hurt the non-member nation economically and politically, and create a strained relationship between the two nations. The decreased output of the good or service traded from one nation with a high comparative advantage to a nation of lower comparative advantage works against creating more efficiency and therefore against more overall surplus. It is widely believed by economists that trade diversion is harmful to consumers.

== See also ==
- Comparative advantage – Lower relative opportunity cost in producing a good
- Trade creation – Economic effect of customs unions
- Trade bloc – Intergovernmental open trading group
