= John Bates Clark =

American economist (1847–1938)

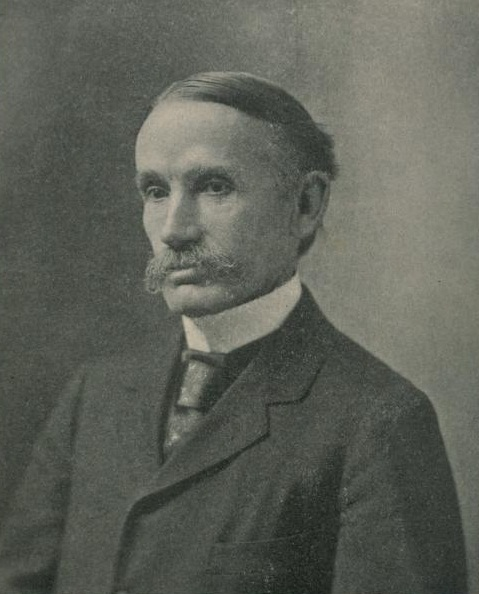
- Born: January 26, 1847; Providence, Rhode Island, US
- Died: March 21, 1938 (aged 91); New York City, US

Academic background
- Education: Amherst College
- Doctoral advisor: Karl Knies
- Influences: Karl Knies

Academic work
- School or tradition: Neoclassical economics
- Institutions: Carleton College; Johns Hopkins University; Columbia University
- Doctoral students: Henry Moore; Alvin Saunders Johnson

John Bates Clark (January 26, 1847 – March 21, 1938) was an American neoclassical economist. He was one of the pioneers of the marginalist revolution and opponent to the Institutionalist school of economics, and spent most of his career as a professor at Columbia University. He was one of the most prominent American economists of his time.

== Life and career ==
Clark was born and raised in Providence, Rhode Island. He graduated from Amherst College, in Massachusetts, at the age of 25 in 1872. From 1872 to 1875, he attended the University of Zurich and the University of Heidelberg where he studied under Karl Knies (a leader of the German Historical School). He taught as a professor of economics at Carleton College from 1875 to 1881 before moving east to teach at Smith College. He subsequently taught at Amherst College, Johns Hopkins University, and Columbia University. Early in his career Clark's writings reflected his German Socialist background and showed him as a critic of capitalism. During his time as a professor at Columbia University however, his views gradually shifted to support of capitalism and he later became known as a leading advocate of the capitalist system. Clark was the father of economist John Maurice Clark. He died in 1938

== Theoretical work ==
After his return, from 1877 onward, Clark published several articles most of them edited later in The Philosophy of Wealth (1886). There he formulated an original version of marginal utility theory, principle already published by Jevons (1871), Menger (1871), and Walras (1878).

Until 1886 Clark was a Christian socialist reflecting the view of his German teachers that competition is no universal remedy – especially not for fixing wages. Clark writes:

It is a dangerous mistake to extol competition, as such too highly, and regard all attacks upon it as revolutionary. … We do not eat men … but we do it by such indirect and refined methods that it does not generally occur to us that we are cannibals.

He hoped that communism could be combatted by suppression and reform:

Among the adherents of Communism there is a large element that is simply murderous, and this deserves only the murderer's fate. ... It is possible that an indefinitely large proportion of declared communists in this country may be of worthless or criminal character.

According to Clark only if "...the union of capital necessitates the union of labour" just wages will come about and may be fixed by arbitration.

This view on fair wages changed in 1886: "Clark himself, it will be remembered has song down the doom of competition in The Philosophy of Wealth. But now … he has reversed his position and build[s] up a body of economic laws based on competition" writes Homan (1928) and Everett (1946) finds: "Soon after writing The Philosophy of Wealth, however, Clark started to make defences for the competitive system. What caused the change is unknown. This much we can say. By the time he wrote The Distribution of Wealth he was convinced that pure competition was the natural and normal law by which the economic order obtained justice." One cause that prompted this reorientation could be the Haymarket Riot (1886) in Chicago when some strikers were shot and others hanged. In the US it resulted in a cleansing of higher education from socialist reformers and the ruin of the Knights of Labor.

In 1888 Clark wrote Capital and Its Earnings. Frank Fetter later reflected on Bates' motivation for writing this work:

The probable source from which immediate stimulation came to Clark was the contemporary single tax discussion. ... Events were just at that time crowding each other fast in the single tax propaganda. [Henry George's] Progress and Poverty... had a larger sale than any other book ever written by an American. ... No other economic subject at the time was comparable in importance in the public eye with the doctrine of Progress and Poverty. Capital and its Earnings "... wears the mien of pure theory .... But ... one can hardly fail to see on almost every page the reflections of the contemporary single-tax discussion. In the brief preface is expressed the hope that 'it may be found that these principles settle questions of agrarian socialism.' Repeatedly the discussion turns to 'the capital that vests itself in land,'...

The foundation of Clark's further work was competition: "If nothing suppresses competition, progress will continue forever". Clark: "The science adapted … is economic Darwinism. … Though the process was savage, the outlook which it afforded was not wholly evil. The survival of crude strength was, in the long run, desirable". This was the fundament to develop the theory which made him famous: Given competition and homogeneous factors of production labor and capital, the repartition of the social product will be according to the productivity of the last physical input of units of labor and capital. This theorem is a cornerstone of neoclassical microeconomics. Clark stated it in 1891 and more elaborated 1899 in The Distribution of Wealth. The same theorem was formulated later independently by John Atkinson Hobson (1891) and Philip Wicksteed (1894). The political message of this theorem is: "[W]hat a social class gets is, under natural law, what it contributes to the general output of industry."

Clark's conclusion rests upon the productive contribution of the last unit of physical labour – one hour unqualified labour – and the last unit of physical capital. To him heterogeneous capital goods have a second, a social form as homogeneous capital (called jelly as a street can be moulded into an engine) and the productivity of the last unit of jelly determines profit. This retakes Karl Marx's view that commodities have a heterogeneous natural form (German: Naturalform) and also opposed to it a homogenous value-form (German: Wertform), jelly. Clark might have known this Marxian construction from his German time and was reproached for this similarity.

Clark's capital are not produced means of production each with a different production structure. It is an abstract, always existing and never perishing one great tool in the hand of working humanity similar to a field or a waterfall, also considered capital by Clark.

The arguable sides of Clark's notion of capital helped to give rise to the Cambridge capital controversy from 1954 to 1965 between the departments of economics at Cambridge University, England, and at MIT in Cambridge, Massachusetts.

Paul A. Samuelson's classic 1947 textbook, Economics, disseminated Clark's concept of capital worldwide.

== Major works ==
- The Philosophy of Wealth: Economic Principles Newly Formulated (1886).
- Capital and Its Earnings (1888).
- The Distribution of Wealth: A Theory of Wages, Interest and Profits (1899).
- Essentials of Economic Theory (1907).
- Social Justice without Socialism (1914).

== See also ==
- Marginal productivity theory
- John Bates Clark Medal

== Sources ==
- Clark, John Bates (July 1878). "How to Deal with Communism". The New Englander. 37 (145): 533–542.
- Clark, John Bates (April 1891). "Distribution as Determined by a Law of Rent". The Quarterly Journal of Economics. 5 (3): 289–318. doi:10.2307/1879611. JSTOR 1879611.
- Clark, John Bates (1908). The Distribution of Wealth: A Theory of Wages, Interest and Profits. New York: The Macmillan Company. ISBN 1409952258.
