= Harry Gunnison Brown =

American economist

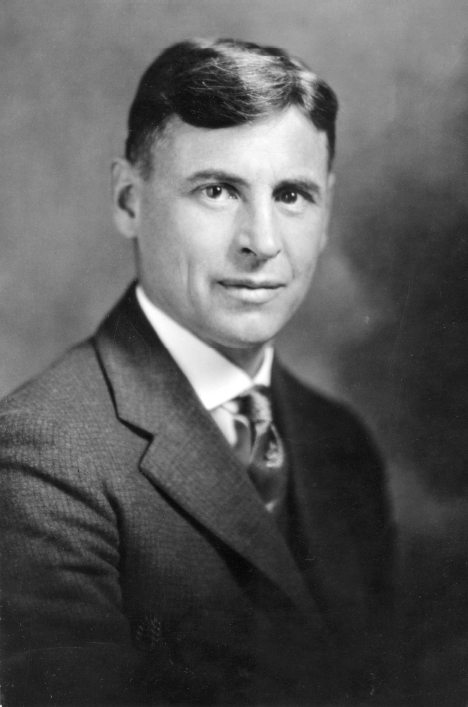
- Portrait of Brown
- Born: May 7, 1880; Troy, New York, USA
- Died: March 11, 1975 (aged 94); Columbia, Missouri, US

Academic background
- Alma mater: Williams College; Yale University
- Doctoral advisor: Irving Fisher
- Influences: George · Fisher · Davenport

Academic work
- Discipline: Monetary economics Public economics
- School or tradition: Neoclassical economics
- Institutions: Yale University; University of Missouri
- Notable students: Beryl Sprinkel

Harry Gunnison Brown (May 7, 1880 – March 11, 1975) was a Georgist economist teaching at Yale in the early 20th century. Paul Samuelson named Brown in a list of "American saints in economics" that included only 6 other economists born after 1860.

== Early life ==
Harry Gunnison Brown was born in Troy, New York to Milton Peers and Elizabeth H. (Gunnison) Brown. He graduated from Williams College in 1904, studied at Ohio State University and he earned his Ph.D. at Yale University in 1909. While studying at Yale, Brown became a protégé of Irving Fisher. Fisher was one of the pioneers in the development of mathematical economics and econometrics in the United States.

On August 23, 1911, he married Fleda Phillips in Columbia, New York. While continuing his career in economics, he had three children: Cleone Elsa Brown, and Philips Hamlin Brown (29 April 1918 - 4 February 2019) and Richmond Flint Brown (April 5, 1925 - ).

Following the death of his first wife in 1953, Dr. Brown was married to librarian and economist Elizabeth Read Brown (1902–1987) until his death in 1975. Together they co-authored six articles and she was a fervent promoter of his work.

He has three living granddaughters: Fleda Brown, Melinda Brown Putz, and Michelle Brown Griggs, and four living grandsons: Kirk Brown, Kevin Brown, Alan Luckey, and Roger Luckey. Two other grandsons, Mark Brown and Dennis Luckey are deceased.

== Academic career ==
After receiving his Ph.D., Brown worked as an instructor under Irving Fisher in the economics department at Yale University until 1915. Brown held Herbert Davenport in high regard, and in 1915 Brown accepted a position under Davenport in the College of Business at the University of Missouri. Brown worked under Davenport for one year at Missouri, until Davenport left for a position at Cornell University in 1916. Brown remained at MU, and during his career he became chairman of the economics department as well as dean of the College of Business and Public Administration. Brown retired from MU in 1950.

For much of his career, he was mainly known North America's foremost advocate of the ideas of a land tax. He is described by Mason Gaffney as having refuted:

- John Bates Clark's argument that the unearned increment was constructive
- Frank Knight's argument that land is like all other resources because it has an opportunity cost
- Richard T. Ely's argument that 'ripening costs' of land speculators justify urban sprawl.

== Economics career ==
Harry Gunnison Brown was known throughout the United States as a Georgist, and stood out as a staunch believer and advocacy of the ideas of Henry George, through a majority of his life he argued for tax reform along the lines proposed by George.

A well known area of specialization of Harry Gunnison Brown was that of taxation, specifically tax incidence. His text, The Economics of Taxation, was known as a benchmark for texts on the subject of Tax incidence.

== Works ==
Brown, Harry. G. (1931) Economic Science and the Common Welfare

McDonough, J. (1925). The Yale Law Journal, 35(2), 249–251. doi:10.2307/789527
