= American Economic Association =

Learned society in the field of economics

- Formation: 1885
- Legal status: Learned society in economics
- Purpose: Encourage research, publication, and free discussion of economic topics
- Headquarters: Nashville, Tennessee, U.S.
- Region served: United States
- Members: 23,000
- President: Katharine Abraham; Harvard University
- Main organ: Executive Committee
- Website: www.aeaweb.org

The American Economic Association (AEA) is a learned society in the field of economics, with approximately 23,000 members. It publishes several peer-reviewed journals, including the Journal of Economic Literature, American Economic Review, and the Journal of Economic Perspectives.

== History and constitution ==
The AEA was established in 1885 in Saratoga Springs, New York by younger progressive economists trained in the German historical school, including Richard T. Ely, Edwin Robert Anderson Seligman and Katharine Coman, the only woman co-founder; Since 1900, it has been under the control of academics.

The Purposes of the Association are the following:

1) The encouragement of economic research, especially the historical and statistical study of the actual conditions of industrial life;

2) The issue of publications on economic subjects;

3) The encouragement of perfect freedom of economic discussion. The Association says that it takes no partisan attitude, nor does it commit its members to any position on practical economic questions. The Association publishes an academic journal in economics, namely, the American Economic Review.

Once composed primarily of college and university economics teachers, the Association, headquartered in Nashville, Tennessee, now attracts increasing members from business and professional groups. Today, the Association has about 23,000 members, and over half are academics. About 15% are employed in business and industry, and the remainder largely by federal, state, and local government or other not-for-profit organizations.

The leadership of the AEA has been dominated by academics from six academic institutions: Harvard, MIT, Chicago, Columbia, Stanford, and Princeton.

== Activities ==
The AEA, in conjunction with over 50 associations in related disciplines known as the Allied Social Science Associations, holds a three-day annual meeting in January to present papers on general economic subjects. The annual meeting features about 500 scholarly sessions. A placement service to assist employers and job applicants begins a day before the meetings. A continuing education program is held immediately after the annual meeting. Topics vary from year to year.

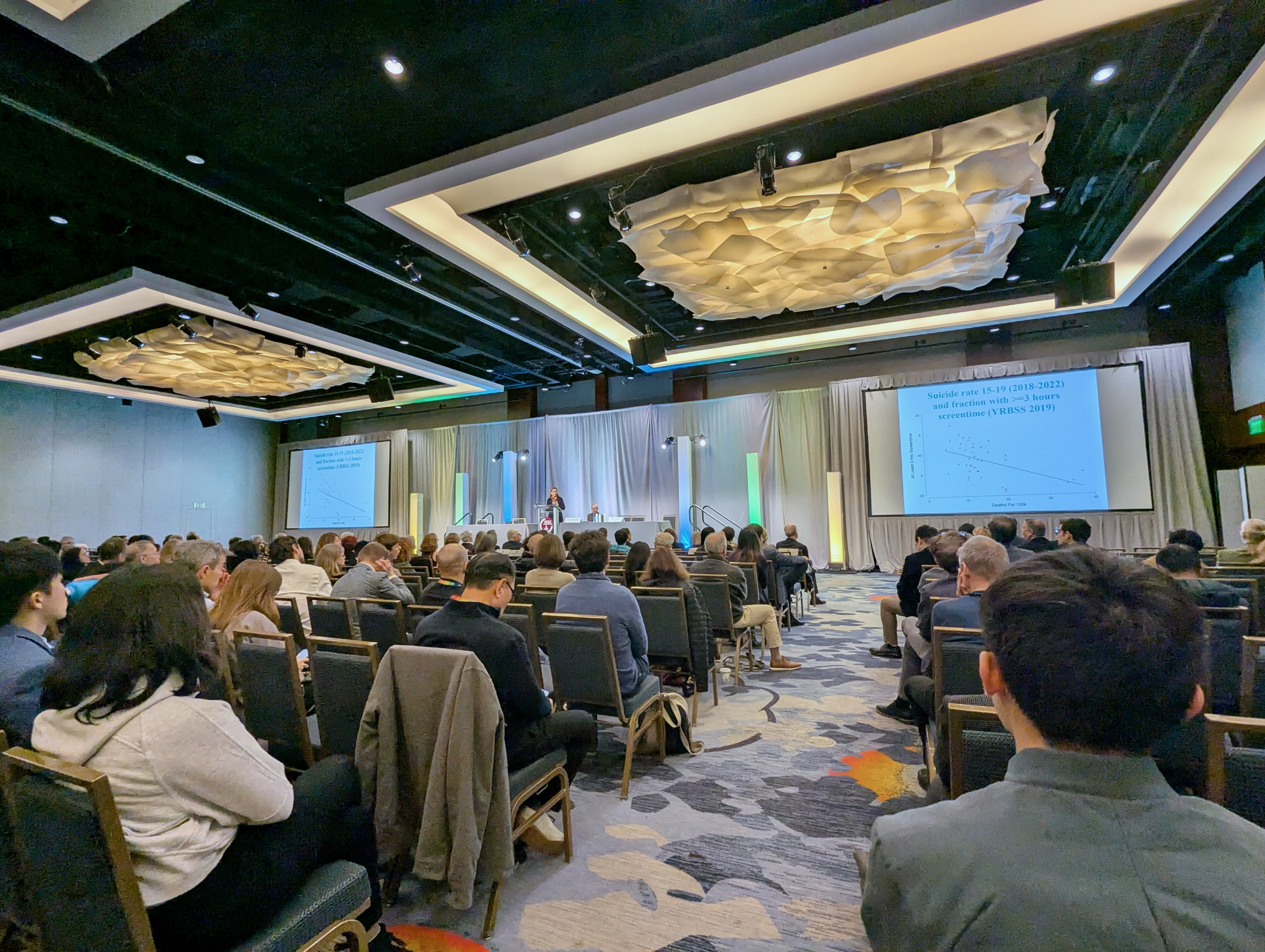
President Janet Currie presents at AEA 2025

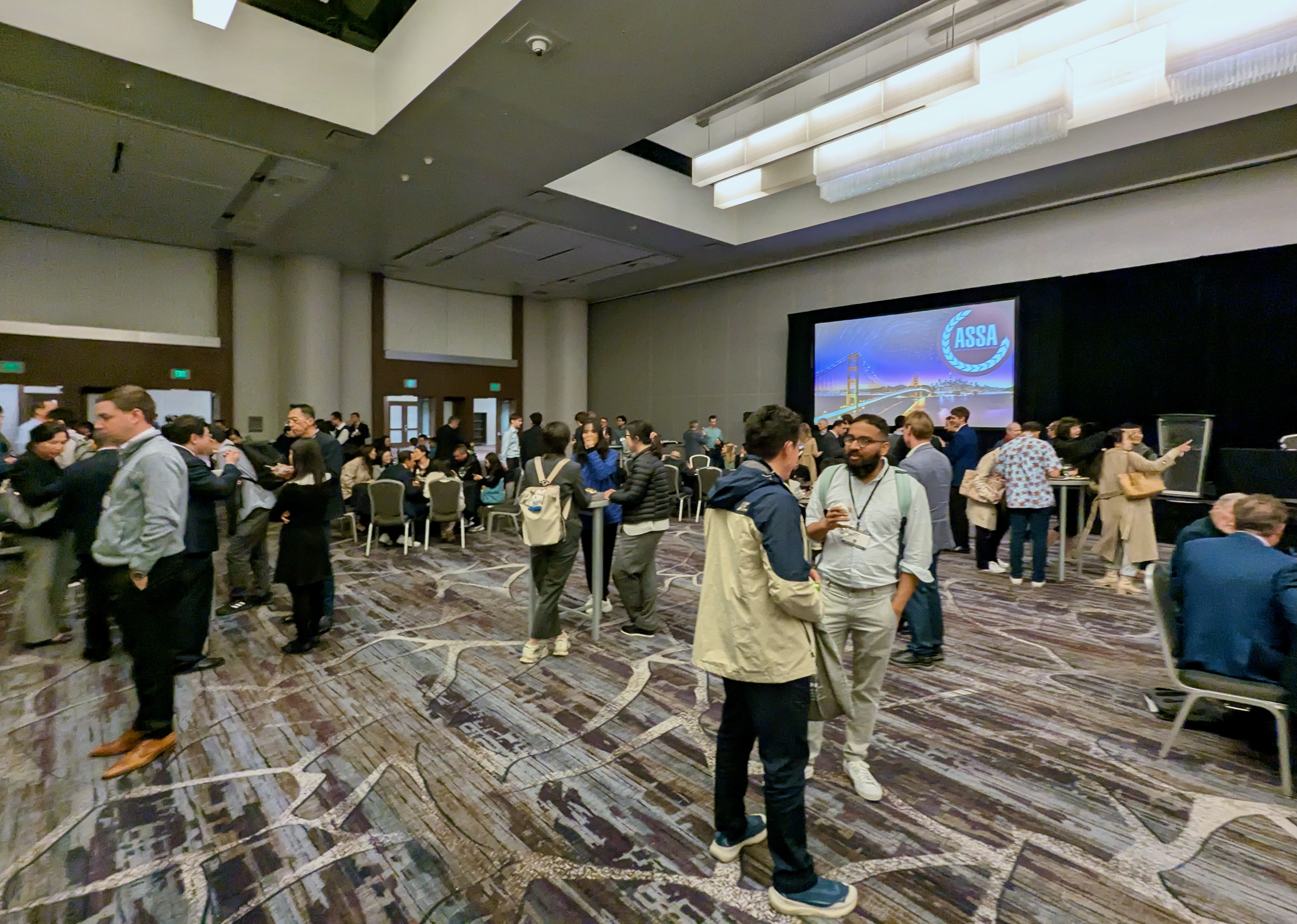
Chinese Economist Society AEA 2025 Reception

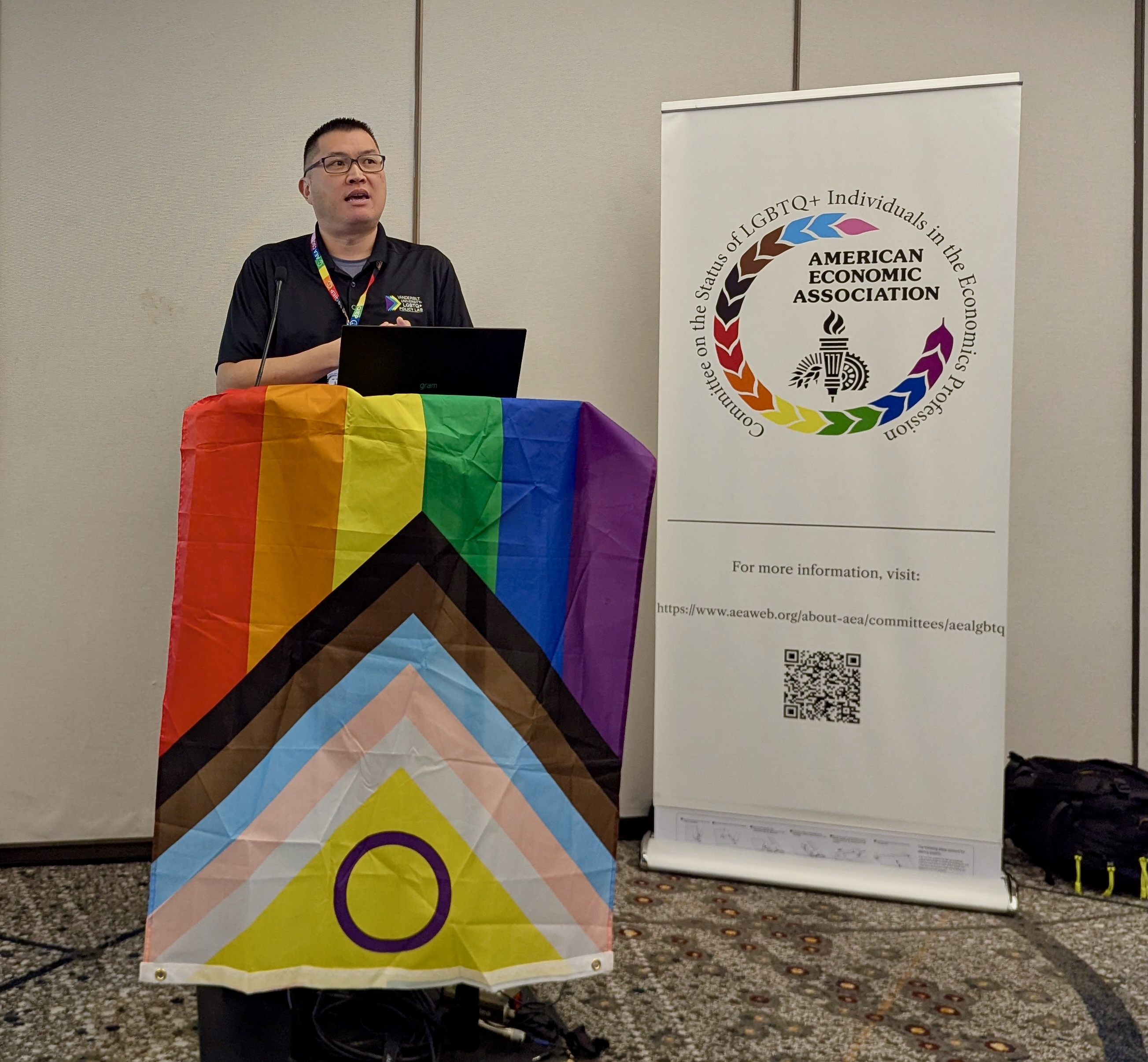
AEA committees such as CSQIEP host events

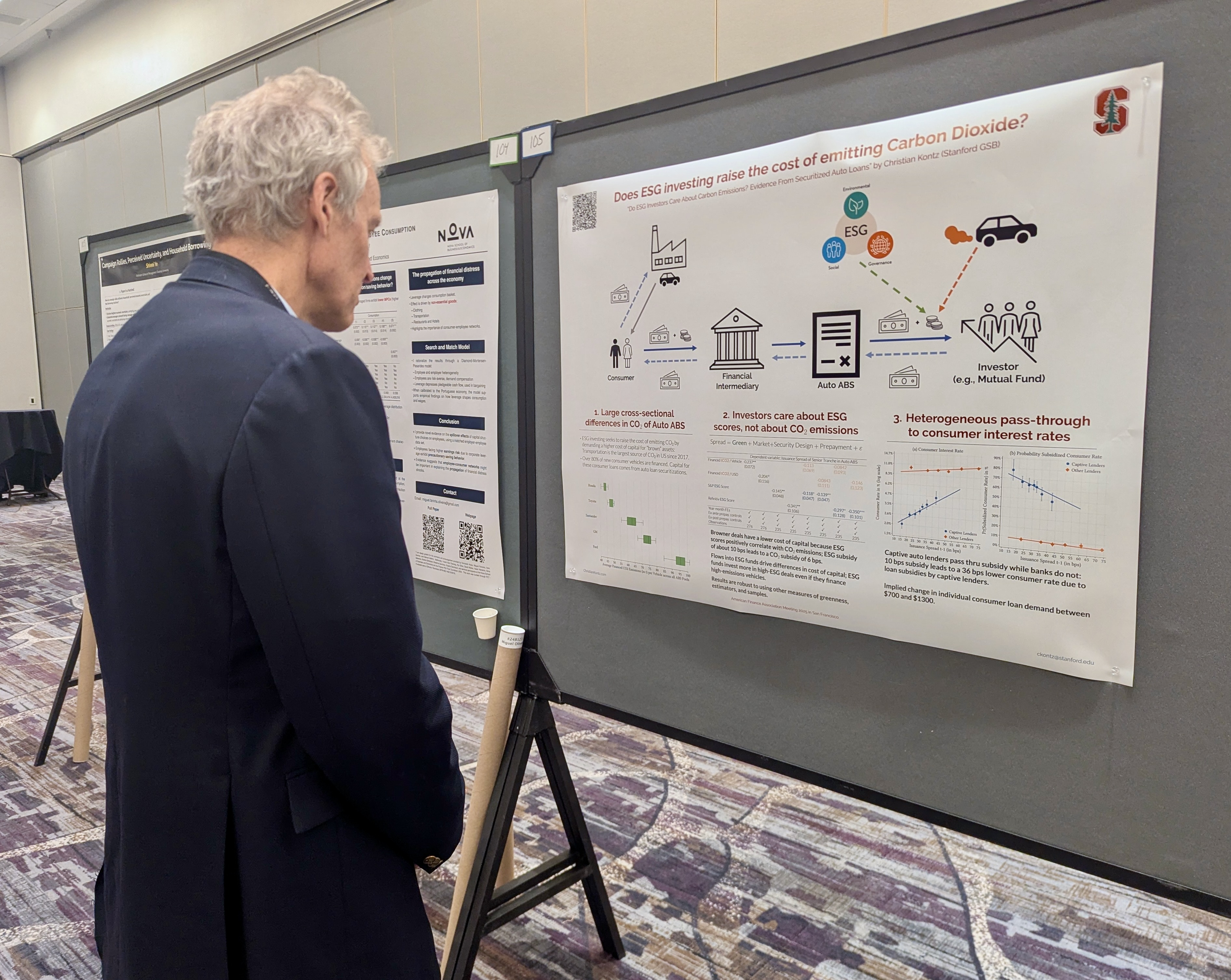
Poster boards displayed at AEA 2025

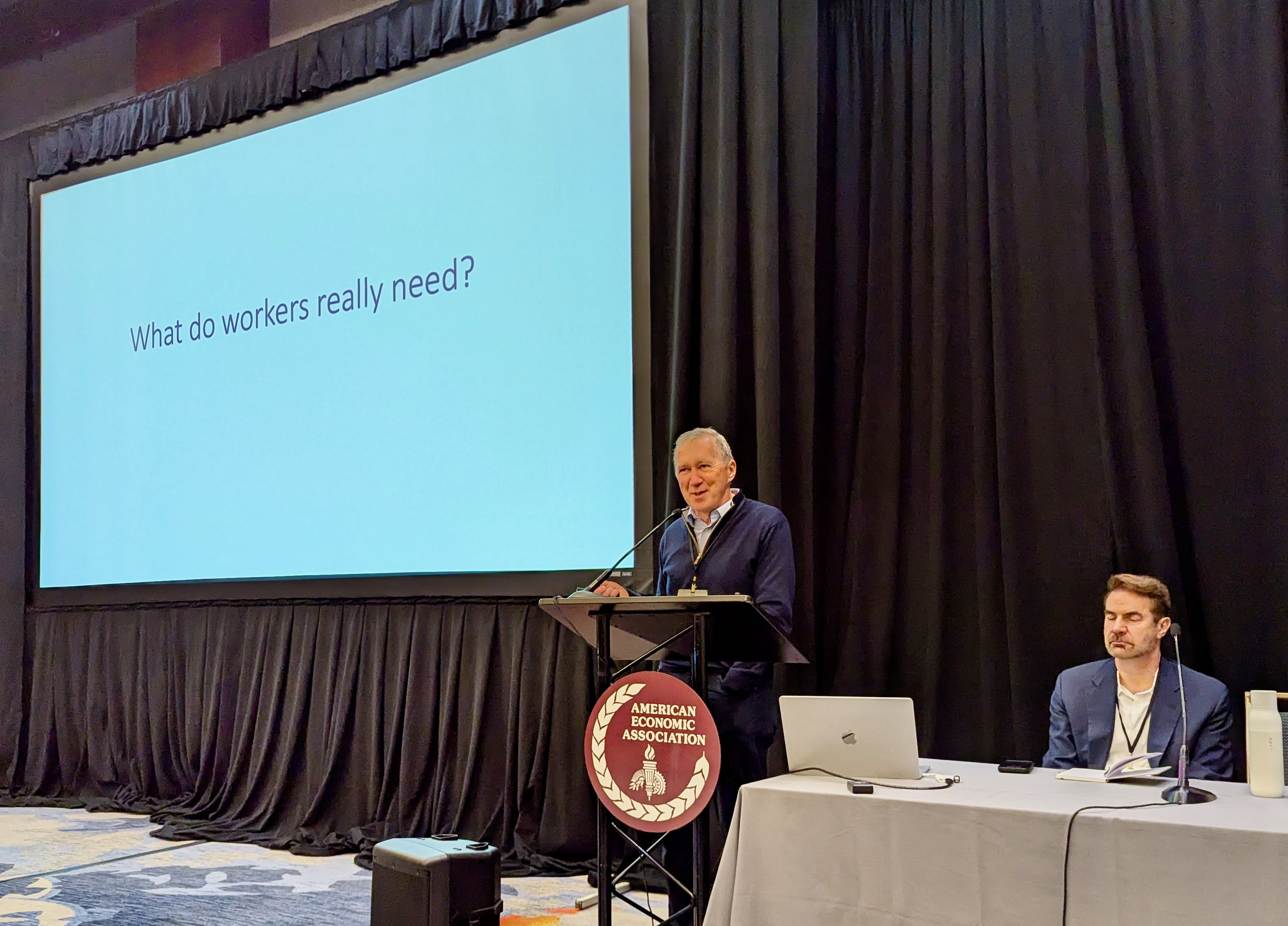
Many non-economists also participate, such as AI/ML pioneer Tom M. Mitchell

The AEA publishes three economics journals: the American Economic Review, the Journal of Economic Literature, and the Journal of Economic Perspectives. In 2009, it began to publish four new area-specific journals, collectively American Economic Journal (AEJ), reporting on applied economics, economic policy, macroeconomics, and microeconomics. The AEA recognizes annually a Best Paper Award for papers published in each of the four areas.

The AEA also publishes AEA Papers and Proceedings each May, featuring papers presented at the AEA meetings in January. Until 2017, these papers were published in the May issue of the American Economic Review.

The AEA also produces EconLit, the AEA's electronic bibliography. It is a comprehensive index to peer-reviewed journal articles, books, book reviews, collective volume articles, working papers, and dissertations. Compiled and abstracted in a searchable format, EconLit indexes 125 years of economic literature worldwide. It follows the JEL classification codes of the Journal of Economic Literature.

The AEA sponsors RFE: Resources for Economists on the Internet, an online source available to the general public without subscription. It catalogs and annotates 2,000+ internet sites under some 97 sections and subsections. RFE is currently updated on a monthly basis.

The AEA resource, Job Openings for Economists (JOE) originated in October 1974, and lists job openings for economists. It is published electronically monthly (except January and July).

Each year, the AEA recognizes the lifetime research contributions of four economists by electing them Distinguished Fellows. The Association also awards the John Bates Clark Medal for outstanding research accomplishments in economics annually to a scholar under the age of 40; it is often referred to as the "Baby Nobel," as many of its recipients go on to become Nobel Laureates.

== Association presidents ==
As of 2025, the president of the association is Katharine Abraham. As of 2021, 18% of presidents have been alumni and 20% faculty of Harvard University.

Past presidents of the association:

- 1886–92 Francis Amasa Walker
- 1893 Charles Franklin Dunbar
- 1894—95 John Bates Clark
- 1896—97 Henry Carter Adams
- 1898—99 Arthur Twining Hadley
- 1900—01 Richard T. Ely
- 1902—03 Edwin Robert Anderson Seligman
- 1904—05 Frank W. Taussig
- 1906—07 Jeremiah Jenks
- 1908 Simon N. Patten
- 1909 Davis Rich Dewey
- 1910 Edmund J. James
- 1911 Henry W. Farnam
- 1912 Frank A. Fetter
- 1913 David Kinley
- 1914 John H. Gray
- 1915 Walter F. Willcox
- 1916 Thomas N. Carver
- 1917 John R. Commons
- 1918 Irving Fisher
- 1919 Henry B. Gardner
- 1920 Herbert J. Davenport
- 1921 Jacob H. Hollander
- 1922 Henry Rogers Seager
- 1923 Carl C. Plehn
- 1924 Wesley C. Mitchell
- 1925 Allyn A. Young
- 1926 Edwin W. Kemmerer
- 1927 Thomas Sewall Adams
- 1928 Fred M. Taylor
- 1929 Edwin Francis Gay
- 1930 Matthew B. Hammond
- 1931 Ernest L. Bogart
- 1932 George E. Barnett
- 1933 William Z. Ripley
- 1934 Harry A. Millis
- 1935 John Maurice Clark
- 1936 Alvin S. Johnson
- 1937 Oliver W. Sprague
- 1938 Alvin H. Hansen
- 1939 Jacob Viner
- 1940 Frederick C. Mills
- 1941 Sumner H. Slichter
- 1942 Edwin G. Nourse
- 1943 Albert B. Wolfe
- 1944 Joseph S. Davis
- 1945 Isaiah Leo Sharfman
- 1946 Emanuel Goldenweiser
- 1947 Paul H. Douglas
- 1948 Joseph A. Schumpeter
- 1949 Howard S. Ellis
- 1950 Frank H. Knight
- 1951 John H. Williams
- 1952 Harold A. Innis
- 1953 Calvin B. Hoover
- 1954 Simon Kuznets
- 1955 John D. Black
- 1956 Edwin E. Witte
- 1957 Morris A. Copeland
- 1958 George W. Stocking
- 1959 Arthur F. Burns
- 1960 Theodore W. Schultz
- 1961 Paul A. Samuelson
- 1962 Edward S. Mason
- 1963 Gottfried Haberler
- 1964 George J. Stigler
- 1965 Joseph J. Spengler
- 1966 Fritz Machlup
- 1967 Milton Friedman
- 1968 Kenneth E. Boulding
- 1969 William J. Fellner
- 1970 Wassily Leontief
- 1971 James Tobin
- 1972 John Kenneth Galbraith
- 1973 Kenneth J. Arrow
- 1974 Walter W. Heller
- 1975 Robert Aaron Gordon
- 1976 Franco Modigliani
- 1977 Lawrence R. Klein
- 1978 Tjalling C. Koopmans
  - Jacob Marschak died before taking office
- 1979 Robert M. Solow
- 1980 Moses Abramovitz
- 1981 William J. Baumol
- 1982 H. Gardner Ackley
- 1983 W. Arthur Lewis
- 1984 Charles L. Schultze
- 1985 Charles P. Kindleberger
- 1986 Alice M. Rivlin (first female president)
- 1987 Gary S. Becker
- 1988 Robert Eisner
- 1989 Joseph A. Pechman
- 1990 Gérard Debreu
- 1991 Thomas C. Schelling
- 1992 William S. Vickrey
- 1993 Zvi Griliches
- 1994 Amartya K. Sen
- 1995 Victor R. Fuchs
- 1996 Anne O. Krueger
- 1997 Arnold C. Harberger
- 1998 Robert W. Fogel
- 1999 D. Gale Johnson
- 2000 Dale W. Jorgenson
- 2001 Sherwin Rosen
- 2002 Robert E. Lucas, Jr.
- 2003 Peter A. Diamond
- 2004 Martin S. Feldstein
- 2005 Daniel L. McFadden
- 2006 George A. Akerlof
- 2007 Thomas J. Sargent
- 2008 Avinash K. Dixit
- 2009 Angus S. Deaton
- 2010 Robert E. Hall
- 2011 Orley C. Ashenfelter
- 2012 Christopher A. Sims
- 2013 Claudia Goldin
- 2014 William D. Nordhaus
- 2015 Richard Thaler
- 2016 Robert J. Shiller
- 2017 Alvin E. Roth
- 2018 Olivier Blanchard
- 2019 Ben Bernanke
- 2020 Janet Yellen
- 2021 David Card
- 2022 Christina Romer
- 2023 Susan Athey
- 2024 Janet Currie
- 2025 Lawrence F. Katz
- 2026 Katharine Abraham

== Distinguished Fellows ==
Distinguished Fellow honorees include:

- 1965 Edward H. Chamberlin / Harold Hotelling / George J. Stigler
- 1966 Abba P. Lerner / Joseph J. Spengler
- 1967 Alvin H. Hansen / Fritz Machlup / Jacob Marschak
- 1968 Milton Friedman / Lloyd A. Metzler
- 1969 Kenneth E. Boulding / Alexander Gerschenkron/ Ludwig E. von Mises
- 1970 William J. Fellner / William Arthur Lewis
- 1971 Nicholas Georgescu-Roegen / Tjalling C. Koopmans/ Wassily Leontief
- 1972 Robert A. Gordon/ Theodore W. Schultz/ Carl S. Shoup/ James Tobin
- 1973 John Kenneth Galbraith / Tibor Scitovsky
- 1974 Kenneth J. Arrow
- 1975 Walter W. Heller
- 1976 Oskar Morgenstern / Herbert A. Simon
- 1977 Leonid Hurwicz / Harry G. Johnson / Simon Kuznets / Franco Modigliani
- 1978 Lawrence R. Klein / Richard A. Musgrave / William S. Vickrey
- 1979 Margaret G. Reid / Ronald H. Coase
- 1980 Solomon Fabricant / Charles P. Kindleberger / Robert M. Solow
- 1981 Moses Abramovitz / Edward F. Denison / H. Gregg Lewis
- 1982 Joe S. Bain / William J. Baumol / Gerard Debreu
- 1983 Gardner Ackley / Abram Bergson / James M. Buchanan
- 1984 Evsey D. Domar / Albert O. Hirschman
- 1985 Joseph Pechman / Paul Rosenstein-Rodan / Charles L. Shultze
- 1987 Arthur S. Goldberger / Alice M. Rivlin / Thomas C. Schelling
- 1988 Gary S. Becker / Hendrik S. Houthakker / Roy Radner
- 1989 Robert Eisner / Jacob Mincer / Guy H. Orcutt
- 1990 Victor R. Fuchs / Merton H. Miller
- 1991 Irving B. Kravis / Herbert E. Scarf
- 1992 Robert Dorfman / Vernon L. Smith
- 1993 Lionel W. McKenzie / Anna J. Schwartz
- 1994 Zvi Griliches / John C. Harsanyi / Kelvin J. Lancaster
- 1995 Geoffrey H. Moore / Walter Oi / Amartya Sen
- 1996 Armen A. Alchian / Robert A. Mundell
- 1997 Martin Bronfenbrenner / Anne O. Krueger / Gordon Tullock
- 1998 Arnold C. Harberger / Alan Heston / Robert Summers
- 1999 David Cass / John Chipman / Robert W. Fogel
- 2000 Jack Hirshleifer / D. Gale Johnson / Edmund S. Phelps
- 2001 Rudiger W. Dornbusch / Dale W. Jorgenson / Allan H. Meltzer
- 2002 Clive Granger / Sherwin Rosen / Arnold Zellner
- 2003 Irma Adelman / Jagdish Bhagwati / Robert E. Lucas / T.N. Srinivasan
- 2004 William A. Brock / Peter A. Diamond / William D. Nordhaus / George P. Shultz
- 2005 Stanley L. Engerman / Martin Feldstein / Michael Rothschild / Hugo F. Sonnenschein
- 2006 Donald J. Brown / Richard A. Easterlin / Daniel McFadden / Robert B. Wilson
- 2007 George A. Akerlof / Orley C. Ashenfelter / Lloyd S. Shapley / Oliver E. Williamson
- 2008 Erwin Diewert / Dale Mortensen / Charles Plott / Thomas J. Sargent
- 2009 Avinash K. Dixit / Ronald Jones / Douglass North / John Pencavel
- 2010 Angus Deaton / Elhanan Helpman / David Kreps / Martin Shubik
- 2011 Alan Blinder / William Brainard / Robert E. Hall / Daniel Kahneman / David Wise
- 2012 Truman F. Bewley / Marc L. Nerlove / Neil Wallace / Janet L. Yellen
- 2013 Harold Demsetz / Stanley Fischer / Jerry Hausman / Paul Joskow / Christopher A. Sims
- 2014 Robert J. Barro / Gregory C. Chow / Claudia Goldin / Robert J. Gordon / Richard Zeckhauser
- 2015 Theodore Bergstrom / Gary Chamberlain / Thomas Rothenberg / Hal Varian
- 2016 Richard Freeman / Glenn Loury / Julio Rotemberg / Isabel Sawhill
- 2017 James Heckman / Charles Manski / Robert A. Pollak / Nancy Stokey
- 2018 Henry Aaron / Francine Blau / Joel Mokyr / Richard Posner
- 2019 Oliver Hart / Edward Lazear / Ariel Pakes / Margaret Slade
- 2020 Katharine Abraham / Shelly Lundberg / Paul Milgrom / Whitney Newey
- 2021 Alan Auerbach / Rebecca Blank / Anne Case / Robert Townsend
- 2022 Sadie T.M. Alexander / David Card / Barry Eichengreen / James Poterba / Carmen Reinhart
- 2023 Guillermo Calvo / Drew Fudenberg / Olivia S. Mitchell / Maurice Obstfeld / Christina Romer
- 2024 Susan Athey / William A. Darity Jr. / Bronwyn Hall / John Haltiwanger / Margaret Simms

== See also ==
- European Economic Association
- International Economic Association
- Political Economy Club
