= Harry Gardner =

Harry Gardner may refer to:

- Harry Gardner (baseball) (1887–1961), American baseball player
- Harry Gardner (cricketer) (1890–1939), English cricketer and British Army officer
- Harry Gardner (footballer) (1878–1957), Australian rules footballer

== See also ==
- Henry Gardner (1819–1892), governor of Massachusetts
- Henry B. Gardner (1863–1939), American economist
- Harry Gardiner (1871–1956), American man famous for climbing buildings
- Harry Gardiner (footballer) (1868–1922), Scottish footballer
- Harry Gardiner (politician) (1907–1974), Australian politician
