= Domar (disambiguation) =

Domar was a mythological king of Sweden.

Domar may also refer to:

== People ==
- Evsey Domar (1914–1997), Russian-American economist
- Domar (caste), Hindu caste found in the state of Uttar Pradesh in India

== Places ==
- Domar Upazila, Bangladesh
- In Tibet:
  - Domar (Shuanghu), a village and township-level division
  - zh:多玛乡 (安多县), see Amdo County
  - zh:多玛乡 (日土县), see Rutog County

== Other terms ==
- Harrod-Domar model, a model of economic growth resulting from savings and capital investment
- Domar aggregation a method in economics for combining industry data together to get an aggregate total
