= John H. Gray (economist) =

American economist (1859–1946)

- Gray in a 1905 publication
- Born: John Henry Gray; March 11, 1859; Charleston, Illinois, U.S.
- Died: April 4, 1946 (aged 87)
- Education: Harvard University
- Occupations: Economist; educator

John Henry Gray (March 11, 1859 – April 4, 1946) was an American economist. He was a professor of economics at Northwestern University, Carleton College, and the University of Minnesota. In 1914, he served as president of the American Economic Association.

== Short biography ==
A native of Charleston, Illinois, Gray earned his bachelor's degree from Harvard University in 1887. He then pursued graduate education under Johannes Conrad at the University of Halle-Wittenberg in Germany, graduating with a PhD in 1892. He was coauthor of The Valuation and Regulation of Public Utilities.

Gray was elected as a Fellow of the American Statistical Association in 1921.
