= Oliver M. W. Sprague =

American economist

- Sprague, c. 1941
- Born: April 22, 1873; Somerville, Massachusetts, U.S.
- Died: May 24, 1953 (aged 80); Boston, Massachusetts
- Spouse: Fanny Knights Ide (m. 1905; died 1942)
- Children: Katherine Ida Sprague; Theodore Wentworth Sprague
- Parent(s): William Wallace Sprague; Miriam Wentworth Sprague

Academic background
- Education: Harvard University
- Thesis: The English Woolen Industry in the Seventeenth and Eighteenth Centuries
- Doctoral advisor: William Ashley (Note: Charles Franklin Dunbar according to INET's HET.)

Academic work
- Discipline: Economics
- Sub-discipline: Fiscal policy, central banking
- Institutions: Harvard University; Imperial University of Tokyo; Harvard Graduate School of Business Administration

Oliver Mitchell Wentworth Sprague (April 22, 1873 – May 24, 1953) was an American economist and president of the American Economic Association in 1937. His research focused on fiscal policy and central banking.

== Early life and education ==
Sprague was born to William Wallace (1842–1912), a businessman, and Miriam Sprague (née Wentworth) on April 22, 1873, in Somerville, Massachusetts. He attended St. Johnsbury Academy and graduated summa cum laude from Harvard University in 1894. He went on to further study at Harvard, receiving an AM in 1896 and a PhD in political science in 1897.

== Career ==
After a year of study in England, Sprague was made Austin Teaching Fellow in political economy, a one-year fixed-term position, at Harvard College in the fall of 1899. (Note: A. Piatt Andrew, later Assistant Secretary of the Treasury, was awarded the same fellowship that year) He became instructor in political economy in 1900 (Note: 1901 according to the 1900-1901 Annual Report of Harvard College) and was promoted to assistant professor of economics in 1904. The Imperial University of Tokyo appointed him as a full professor of economics in 1905, where he stayed until 1908 when he returned to Harvard as an assistant professor of banking and finance at the Harvard Graduate School of Business Administration. He was made Edmund Cogswell Converse Professor of Banking and Finance in 1913, a post he held until his retirement in 1941.

He was elected fellow of the American Academy of Arts and Sciences in 1931 and member of the American Philosophical Society in 1938.

He served on the editorial board of the Quarterly Journal of Economics from 1909 to 1920.

== Other activities ==
Sprague held numerous advisory roles throughout his career. The Bank of England appointed him Chief Economist from 1930 to 1933; he was the second American to occupy this role. (Note: Following Walter W. Stewart, who served 1928–1930.) He also advised the Reichsbank, the Bank of France, the Bank for International Settlements, and the League of Nations. He was a member of the League's Gold Delegation, which promoted the Gold Standard.

Following his stint at the Bank of England, he served as assistant to the Secretary of the Treasury in 1933, a role he left the same year due to disagreement over the optimal path to recovery for the US economy.

He used his expertise for various positions in the private sector too. He was a director of the National Shawmut Bank and a foreign exchange advisor to the General Motors Corporation. He died in Boston, aged 80.

== Personal life ==
Sprague married Fanny Knights Ide (Note: died on August 4, 1942) in 1905. They had two children, Katherine Ida and Theodore Wentworth Sprague. He had four siblings: Charles Wentworth, Maude, Arthur and William. The number of publications he could author was limited by his poor eyesight.

Theodore (1912–2000) would graduate from the University of Cambridge, attend Johns Hopkins University for a year and receive his PhD in economics and sociology from Harvard in 1942, writing about "Some problems in the integration of social groups, with special reference to Jehovah's Witnesses", then become a substitute instructor in sociology at the University of Connecticut. He went on to teach sociology at Earlham College and Colgate University. He became a competitive dog breeder after his retirement.

== Selected works ==
- Sprague, Oliver Mitchell Wentworth (1910). History of crises under the national banking system (PDF) (Report). Washington: Government Printing Office. OCLC 988890094.
- Sprague, Oliver Mitchell Wentworth (1911). Banking Reform in the United States: A Series of Proposals, Including a Central Bank of Limited Scope. Creative Media Partners, LLC. ISBN 978-1360510019.
- Dunbar, Charles F.; Lindsay, Lady Jane (January 21, 2014). Chapters on the Theory and History of Banking. CreateSpace Independent Publishing Platform. ISBN 9781495293719. (Note: Left uncompleted at Charles Dunbar's death and finished by Sprague)
- Sprague, Oliver Mitchell Wentworth (1934). Recovery and Common Sense.
