= Bellagio Group =

International economics discussion group

The Bellagio Group is a group of international economists, senior central bankers and Treasury officials who meet annually to discuss international economic and financial issues.

== History ==
The group was formed in the 1960s by Austrian economist Fritz Machlup along with William Fellner and Robert Triffin. This was partially in response to G-10 leader Douglas Dillon's statement that academics were not being invited to participate in IMF and G-10 studies on monetary reform because they could not agree on solutions. Machlup wished to focus on and interrogate those disagreements and the group was seen as providing an intellectual, as opposed to political, assessment of aspects of monetary reform.

Early meetings were held at the Rockefeller Foundation Center, overlooking the town of Bellagio which gave the group its name. Membership in the group is split between international economists from academia and senior officials from central banks and treasury departments. The initial focus of the group was on constructing a proposal for "exchange rates and adjustment mechanisms for the international monetary system."

Machlup focused on specific monetary reform goals—liquidity, adjustment and confidence—looking at the assumptions behind plans to achieve them, as well as "opportunity costs of alternative [reform] plans". The group had its first meeting in December 1963 with subsequent meetings in January, March and May of 1964. At the end of this fourth conference the group published International Monetary Arrangements: The Problem of Choice: A Report on the Deliberations of an International Study Group of 32 Economists.

In 1965, Fritz Machlup was asked by G-10 leader Otmar Emminger for the group's assistance in "creating an environment for policy makers to discuss adjustment issues and recommendations". This began a 14-year collaboration with 15 conferences starting in 1966. The early Bellagio Group's successors include the Group of Thirty, the Bürgenstock Conferences and the Joint Conferences of Officials and Academics. After meeting regularly from 1964 to 1974, the group ceased meeting when major industrial countries had mostly moved to floating exchange rates.

== Current status ==
The Bellagio Group was revived in 1996 by Andrew Crockett, the General Manager of the Bank for International Settlements, who asked Peter Kenen to be the convener. Leadership of the group then passed to Barry Eichengreen of Berkeley from 2004 to 2020, and then to Kristin Forbes of MIT in 2020. The group meets annually, usually at one of the participating central banks or other institutions.

== Members ==
Past members of the group include prominent international economists such as: Rudiger Dornbusch, Stanley Fischer, Francesco Giavazzi, Peter Kenen, Philip Lane, Raghu Rajan, Ken Rogoff and Charles Wyplosz.
