= Penrosian =

Penrosian is an eponym and may refer to:

- Edith Penrose (1914–1996), American-born British economist
- Roger Penrose (b. 1931), British mathematical physicist
