= Kristin Forbes =

American economist (b. 1970)

Kristin Forbes Honorary CBE

External Member of the Bank of England Monetary Policy Committee
- In office July 2014 – June 2017
- Governor: Mark Carney
- Preceded by: Ben Broadbent
- Succeeded by: Silvana Tenreyro

Member of the White House Council of Economic Advisers
- In office May 2003 – June 2005
- President: George W. Bush
- Preceded by: Randall Kroszner
- Succeeded by: Matthew J. Slaughter; Katherine Baicker

Personal details
- Born: 21 August 1970 (age 56) Concord, New Hampshire, U.S.
- Spouse: Steve Calhoun
- Education: Massachusetts Institute of Technology (PhD 1998) Williams College (BA 1992)

Academic background
- Doctoral advisor: Rudi Dornbusch • Paul Krugman • Jaume Ventura

Academic work
- Discipline: Macroeconomics; International economics Monetary economics
- Institutions: MIT Sloan (1998–present); NBER (2000–present)
- Awards: NSF Graduate Research Fellowship Program; Ford Foundation Fellowship; Michael Brennan Award
- Website: Information at IDEAS / RePEc

Kristin J. Forbes (born August 21, 1970) is an American macroeconomist and policy adviser currently serving as the Jerome and Dorothy Lemelson Professor of Management and Global Economics at the MIT Sloan School of Management. She was formerly a member of the White House Council of Economic Advisers under President George W. Bush and an external member of the Monetary Policy Committee of the Bank of England. Forbes' research focuses on international macroeconomics, monetary economics, and macroprudential policy. Alongside her academic appointments, she sits on the National Bureau of Economic Research's Business Cycle Dating Committee and is on advisory boards to the International Monetary Fund and Bank for International Settlements. Forbes has been the convener of the Bellagio Group since 2020. She was named an Honorary Commander of the Order of the British Empire (CBE) in 2019.

== Early life and education ==
Forbes was born on August 21, 1970, in Concord, New Hampshire, the eldest of three children. Her father was an orthopedist, and her mother was a stay-at-home mom. Forbes attended Concord High School and in 1988 was selected as a Presidential Scholar, earning a trip to Washington, D.C. to meet President Ronald Reagan in the White House Rose Garden.

After graduating from high school, Forbes enrolled at Williams College, taking first-year courses in astrophysics, economics, religion, and psychology. She chose economics as her major, crediting Morton O. Schapiro for inspiring her interest in the subject. She graduated summa cum laude and Phi Beta Kappa in 1992, receiving a BA in economics and winning the David Wells prize for best undergraduate thesis.

After completing her undergraduate studies, Forbes joined the investment banking division of Morgan Stanley as an analyst. After one year at the bank, Dick Sabot put Forbes in touch with Nancy Birdsall at the World Bank, who hired her for a project examining the determinants of economic growth in Latin America. The role inspired an interest in macroeconomics, encouraging Forbes to pursue a PhD and a career in economic policy. She pursued graduate studies at the Massachusetts Institute of Technology, where her dissertation research was supervised by Paul Krugman, Rudi Dornbusch, and Jaume Ventura and was supported by the NSF Graduate Research Fellowship Program. During her studies, Forbes spent three months traveling in India, and pursued research on financial contagion and the relationship between inequality and economic growth. She received her PhD in 1998, winning the Robert Solow prize for excellence in research and teaching.

== Career ==
After receiving her PhD in 1998, Forbes joined the MIT Sloan School of Management, an affiliation which she has maintained since and allowed her to take several periods of leave to serve in policy roles. She began as assistant professor of economics and gained tenure in 2004. In 2009, she became the Jerome and Dorothy Lemelson professor of management and global economics at MIT. From 2021-2024 she also served in an administrative role as the Area Head for Behavioral and Policy Sciences (one of the three divisions at MIT-Sloan).

Alongside her academic appointment, Forbes became an affiliate of the National Bureau of Economic Research and Center for Economic and Policy Research, and a member of the Council on Foreign Relations. From 2009-2014 she served on the Governor’s Council of Economic Advisors for the State of Massachusetts. She was on the academic advisory board for the Federal Reserve Bank of New York (2018-2024), Congressional Budget Office (2009–11, 2013–14), Peterson Institute for International Economics (2005–14) and Center for Global Development (2005–14). She also served on the editorial board of the American Economic Journal: Economic Policy from 2007-2010.

=== U.S. Department of Treasury and Council of Economic Advisers ===
Forbes accepted her first policy position in 2001, when John B. Taylor recruited her to become Deputy Assistant Secretary of Quantitative Policy Analysis for the Latin American and Caribbean Nations at the United States Department of the Treasury. Her role initially involved developing an “early warning system” to track the spread of financial vulnerabilities around the world, including the crisis in Argentina and financial stability in Latin America. She also worked on helping develop new aid programs, including the Millennium Challenge Corporation.

After returning to MIT, Forbes was recruited in 2003 by Gregory Mankiw to join the Council of Economic Advisers of George W. Bush, where she became the youngest person in history to hold her position. As a member of the Council of Economic Advisers, Forbes focused on international issues, including the economic ascendance of China, exchange rates, capital flows, Argentina and even space. She left the CEA in 2005, returning to her academic position.

=== Bank of England ===
In 2014, UK Chancellor of the Exchequer George Osborne appointed Forbes to be an external member of the Monetary Policy Committee of the Bank of England, replacing Ben Broadbent, who was promoted to Deputy Governor of Monetary Policy.

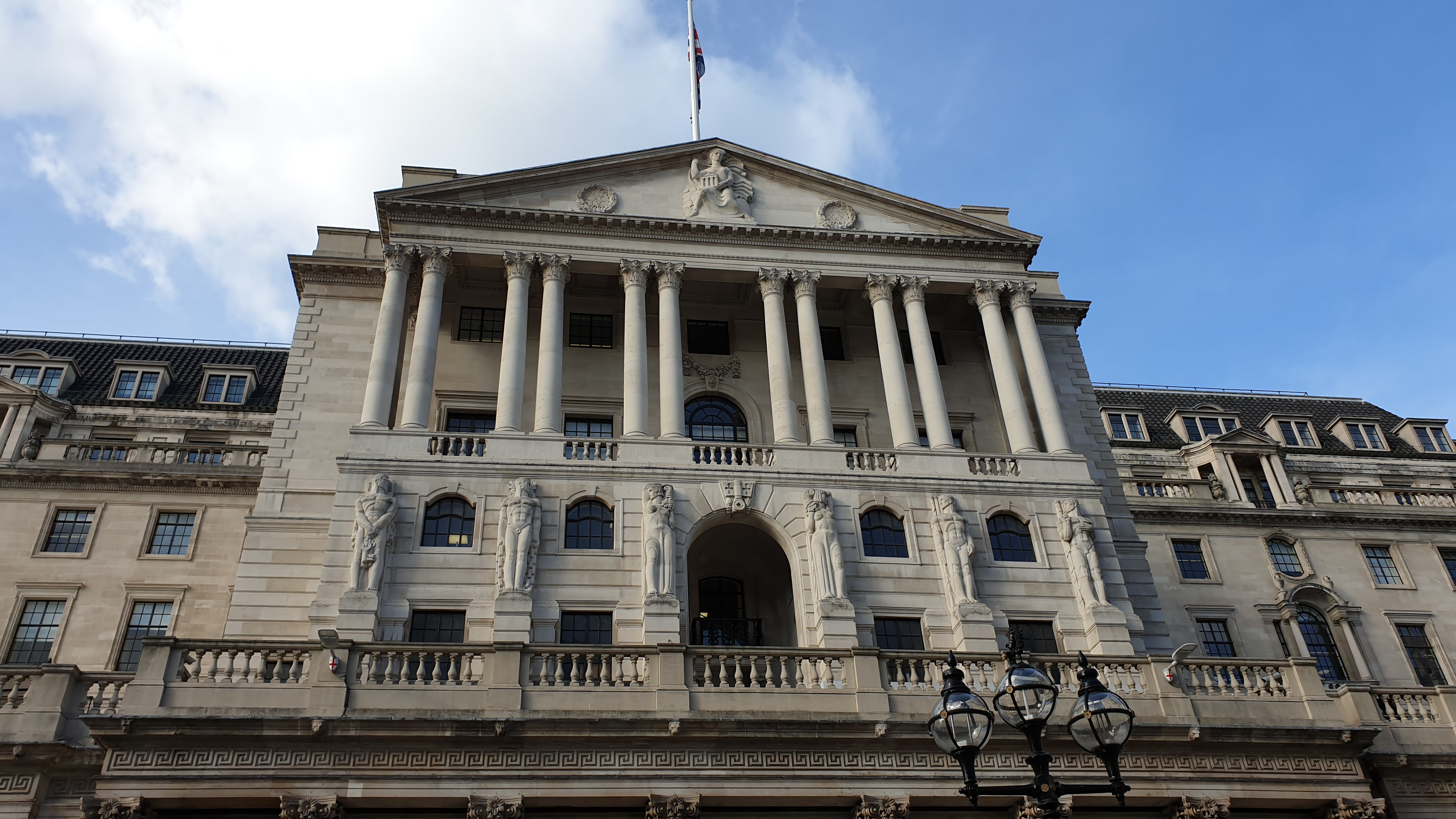
Facade of the Bank of England in London

At the Bank of England, Forbes was an occasional dissenter, with commentators labelling her both a monetary policy "dove" and "hawk" at different points in her tenure. In the early months of her position, Forbes advocated against interest rises, arguing that insufficient information was available on whether inflationary pressures in the UK were being masked by the strengthening of the Pound sterling, and the corresponding fall in import prices. She discussed this tradeoff in her first public speech as a Monetary Policy Committee member, delivered at an event at the Canadian Imperial Bank of Commerce.

In later years, Forbes would become an advocate for interest rate rises, arguing that pessimism about the state of the global economy was overstated. In response to the 2016 Brexit referendum, Forbes warned about rushing to cut interest rates until there was more information on the economic impact. In August 2016, she joined a unanimous majority of the Monetary Policy Committee to lower rates from 0.5% to 0.25%. but voted against the 6-3 majority decision to restart purchases of government bonds and was the only member to vote against starting a new program to purchase corporate bonds.

Interest rates, as set by the UK Monetary Policy Committee, 1997 to the present

In the months after this vote, Forbes emphasized in public statements that uncertainty created by Brexit was less of a drag on growth than was previously expected, and advocated against further monetary stimulus and rate cuts. In June 2017, Forbes joined Ian McCafferty and Michael Saunders to vote in favor of an interest rate increase, bringing the Bank of England closer to a rate increase than any time since 2007. The 5–3 vote was a surprise to analysts, and led to a sharp increase in the value of the Pound. Interest rates were later increased in November 2017.

Forbes left the Bank of England in June 2017, returning to her post at MIT. She was replaced by Silvana Tenreyro, a professor of economics at the London School of Economics. In leaving her role, Forbes criticized the Bank of England and other central banks, arguing that the high public profile of central bankers discouraged aggressive action against inflation. She also argued that an overload of work for senior economists discouraged deviations from baseline models and analysis. Mark Carney, then-Governor of the Bank of England, emphasized that Forbes provided "insight, fresh-thinking and academic rigour to our [the Bank of England's] deliberations, as well as a fresh and engaging approach to communications."

=== Later career (2017–present) ===
Forbes left the Bank of England in June 2017 and returned to her full-time position at MIT. In 2019, she was named an Honorary Commander of the Order of the British Empire (CBE) by Queen Elizabeth II for her service on the Monetary Policy Committee. In 2020 she replaced Barry Eichengreen as the convener of the Bellagio Group. In 2025 she was appointed as a member of the NBER's Business Cycle Dating Committee.

== Research ==
Alongside her policy positions, Forbes pursues research on international macroeconomics and monetary economics. According to Research Papers in Economics, she is among the most productive economists in the world, ranking within the top 40 female economists by research output.

=== Monetary Policy, Rate Cycles, and Inflation ===
Forbes's research addresses how central banks respond to global forces affecting domestic inflation. Her 2026 book The Art of Monetary Policy (MIT Press) applies strategic frameworks to monetary policy under uncertainty. With Ha and Kose, she developed "Rate Cycles," a classification system for monetary policy cycles. Her empirical work argues that domestic inflation is increasingly driven by global factors including commodity prices, supply chains, and world economic slack, and that conventional Phillips curve models do not adequately capture these influences.

=== Financial Contagion and Crisis Transmission ===
With Roberto Rigobon, Forbes developed a methodology to correct for bias in measuring stock market comovements during crises. Their findings suggest most crises spread through linkages present across all market conditions rather than through crisis-specific channels. Using firm-level data from over 10,000 companies in 46 countries, she identified trade flows and third-market competition as determinants of country vulnerability to financial contagion, finding little evidence of a generalized credit crunch driving contagion.

=== Capital Flows and Exchange Rates ===
With Frank Warnock, Forbes developed a framework for analyzing capital flow waves that distinguishes between the behavior of foreign investors and domestic residents. Related work examines how capital flows affect exchange rates and consumer prices (pass-through) and why this relationship varies over time.

== Honors and awards ==
- Honorary Commander of the Order of the British Empire (CBE), awarded by Queen Elizabeth II (2019)
- Bicentennial Medal from Williams College (2015)
- Generation Next, leading 25 economists under 45 who are "shaping how we think about the global economy," from Finance & Development (2014)
- Milken Award for Distinguished Economic Research (2000)
- Robert Solow Prize for excellence in research and teaching, MIT (1998)
- Named a "Young Global Leader" (2005) and "Global Leader for Tomorrow" (2003) by the World Economic Forum
- National Science Foundation Graduate Research Fellowship
- Ford Foundation Fellowship
- David Wells Prize in Economics: Best economics thesis at Williams College, 1992.

== Selected publications ==
- "No Contagion, Only Interdependence: Measuring Stock Market Comovements" (with Roberto Rigobon). Journal of Finance, 57(5), 2223–2261 (2002).
- "Capital Flow Waves: Surges, Stops, Flight and Retrenchment" (with Frank Warnock). Journal of International Economics, 88(2), 235–251. (2012)
- "A Reassessment of the Relationship between Inequality and Growth." American Economic Review, 90(4), 869–887 (2000).
- "One Cost of the Chilean Capital Controls: Increased Financial Constraints for Smaller Traded Firms." Journal of International Economics, 71(2), 294–323 (2007).
- "The Asian Flu and Russian Virus: The International Transmission of Crises in Firm-Level Data." Journal of International Economics, 63(1), 59–92 (2004).
- "Financial Constraints and Growth: Multinational and Local Firm Responses to Currency Depreciations" (with Mihir Desai and Fritz Foley). Review of Financial Studies 21(6): 2857-2888 (2008).
- "Bubble Thy Neighbor: Portfolio Effects and Externalities from Capital Controls" (with Marcel Fratzscher and Roland Straub). Journal of International Economics (2016).
- "The 'Big C': Identifying and Mitigating Contagion." In The Changing Policy Landscape 2012, Federal Reserve Bank of Kansas City, Jackson Hole Economic Symposium, 23–87 (2013)
- "The Shocks Matter: Improving Our Estimates of Exchange Rate Pass-Through" (with Ida Hjortsoe and Tsvetelina Nenova). Journal of International Economics, 114, 255–275.
- "Heaven or Earth? The Evolving Role of Global Shocks for Domestic Monetary Policy" (with Jongrim Ha and Ayhan Kose). Forthcoming, Journal of Political Economy: Macro (NBER WP 34806).
