= Masahiko Aoki =

Japanese economist (1938–2015)

- Born: April 1, 1938; Nagoya, Aichi, Japan
- Died: July 15, 2015 (aged 77); Palo Alto, California, United States
- Spouse: Reiko Aoki

Academic background
- Education: University of Minnesota (Ph.D. 1967); Tokyo University (M.A. 1964) (B.A. 1962)
- Thesis: Increasing returns to scale and market mechanisms (1967)
- Doctoral advisor: John Chipman
- Influences: Leonid Hurwicz; Kenneth Arrow

Academic work
- Discipline: Comparative Institutional Analysis
- School or tradition: New institutional economics
- Institutions: Stanford University; Harvard University; Kyoto University
- Website: Information at IDEAS / RePEc

Masahiko Aoki (April 1, 1938 – July 15, 2015) was a Japanese economist, Tomoye and Henri Takahashi Professor Emeritus of Japanese Studies in the Economics Department, and Senior Fellow of the Stanford Institute for Economic Policy Research and Freeman Spogli Institute for International Studies at Stanford University. Aoki was known for his work in comparative institutional analysis, corporate governance, the theory of the firm, and comparative East Asian development.

== Early life and education ==
Aoki was born in Nagoya, Aichi Prefecture in 1938. He received his B.A. and M.A. in economics from Tokyo University in 1962 and 1964. As a university student, Aoki was a communist activist, and one of the leaders of a radical Marxist student activist organization, the Communist League, better known by its German-derived nickname, "The Bund." Writing a number of theoretical tracts under his pen name, Himeoka Reiji, Aoki was also the Bund's primary ideologue and theoretician, and helped drive the Bund's radical behavior during the massive 1960 Anpo protests against the U.S.-Japan Security Treaty.

After the protests, however, Aoki disavowed his previous stances and moved to the United States to pursue a Ph.D. degree in economics. In 1967, Aoki received his Ph.D. from the University of Minnesota, where he studied under John Chipman and Nobel Laureate Leonid Hurwicz.

== Academic career ==
Aoki became assistant professor at Stanford University in 1967, Harvard University in 1968, and Kyoto University in 1969, where he remained until his promotion to full professor in 1977. In 1984, he returned to Stanford University as a professor of economics, and became professor emeritus of Kyoto University in 2001. In order to focus on research and take a greater role in international activities, he became professor emeritus of Stanford University in 2004. Since 2011 he served as the Senior Visiting Fellow at the Asian Development Bank Institute in Tokyo. Aoki also held visiting positions at Tokyo University, Keio University, Hitotsubashi University, Harvard University, the London School of Economics, and the Max Planck Institute in Cologne. In 1987–1988, Aoki was a Residential Fellow at the Swedish Collegium for Advanced Study in Uppsala, Sweden.

== Research career ==
Aoki's research has been also published in the leading journals in economics, including the American Economic Review, Econometrica, the Quarterly Journal of Economics, Review of Economic Studies, the Journal of Economic Literature, Industrial and Corporate Change, and the Journal of Economic Behavior and Organizations.

Aoki was the founding editor of the Journal of the Japanese and International Economies.

Besides authoring five books, Aoki was active in organizing international research projects on various institutional topics and has edited more than ten books for institutions such as the World Bank and the International Economic Association, to which more than 200 scholars from more than 20 countries contributed.

Aoki was president of the Japanese Economic Association from 1995 to 1996, and President of the International Economic Association from 2008 to 2011. He was also a Fellow of the Econometric Society.

Aoki served as president of the Japanese Government's Research Institute of Economy, Trade and Industry (RIETI), where he stressed the necessity of a trans-disciplinary approach to public policy research.

== Academic contributions ==
Aoki's major academic contributions to economics and the social sciences in general were in the fields of the comparative institutional analysis, the theory of the firm, and corporate governance.

=== Comparative institutional analysis ===
Aoki's research made him a pioneer and leader in comparative institutional analysis.

Together with Paul Milgrom, Avner Greif, Yingyi Qian, and Marcel Fafchamp, he created a comparative institutional field in the economics department at Stanford in the early 1990s. They conceptualized institutions as equilibrium phenomena in societal games rather than something given exogenously by factors such as law, policy, and culture. From this perspective he laid analytical foundations for basic concepts in institutional analysis such as institutional complementarities, social embeddedness (linked games), and public representations mediating the salient features of the state of play and individual beliefs, and applied them to comparative analysis across countries and regions. Aoki was the first to directly apply institutional analysis to Japan, arguing in the late 1980s that institutions such as lifetime employment, the main bank system, long-term supplier relations, and government as an interest group mediator were in mutually complementary, game-theoretic equilibria in the context of Japan's institutional evolution.

In his 2001 work, Toward a Comparative Institutional Analysis, Aoki developed a conceptual and analytical game theoretic approach to comparative studies of institutions. He used this framework to analyze how institutions evolve, why institutional structures are diverse across economies, and what factors lead to institutional change or rigidity.

=== Theory of the firm ===
The Cooperative Game Theory of the Firm (1984) was a first attempt to synthesize and unify various theories of the firm, such as neoclassical, worker controlled, and stakeholder society views, as special cases of corporate governance with varied weights of bargaining power attributed to the members of the firm. Aoki's interests then moved into comparisons of various internal information structures of the firm (hierarchical, horizontal and modular), and its applications to international varieties of corporate firms across Anglo-American, Japanese, German, Silicon Valley, and Chinese systems, as well as to a comparative assessment of nuclear power disasters (Three Mile Island, Chernobyl and Fukushima). These two viewpoints on corporate firms: a game-theoretic approach to corporate governance and information systemic approach to the internal structure of corporate firms are synthesized in Aoki's 2008 Clarendon Lectures, Corporations in Evolving Diversity. Relying on a recent development of potential game theory, he also showed that sufficient and necessary conditions for corporate stakeholders with different payoff functions to behave as if they have a common objective is that they share a common distributive value (technically represented as Shapley value). This insight places the economic theory of the firm in a broader frame of institutional analysis.

== Death ==
Aoki died on July 15, 2015, at the age of 77. A Memorial Conference celebrating his life and work was held at Stanford University on December 4, 2015, and included addresses by Kenneth Arrow, Francis Fukuyama, Koichi Hamada, and Dale Jorgenson. After his death, his papers were donated to Duke University by his wife Reiko Aoki.

== Awards and honors ==
- 1981: Fellow, Econometric Society
- 1990: Japan Academy Prize
- 1990: Hiromi Arisawa Memorial Award for the Best Book on Asia (The Association of American University Presses)
- 1993: Foreign Member, Swedish Royal Academy of Engineering Sciences (Economics)
- 1995–96 President: Japanese Economic Association
- 1996: Honorary visiting professor, People's University of China
- 1997: Distinguished visiting fellow, LSE
- 1998: Schumpeter Prize (International Joseph A. Schumpeter Society)
- 1999: Walras-Pareto Lecture, University of Lausanne
- 2003: Honorary guest professor, Tsinghua University (Beijing)
- 2008: Clarendon Lectures in Management Studies, Oxford University
- 2008–2011 President: the International Economic Association

== Selected works ==
- The Cooperative Game Theory of the Firm (Oxford University Press, 1984, trans., Japanese, 1984);
- Economic Analysis of the Japanese Firm (ed.), (North-Holland, 1984);
- Information, Incentives, and Bargaining in the Japanese Economy (Cambridge, 1988, trans. Spanish 1990, French 1991, Italian 1991, Japanese 1991, Chinese 1994, Russian 1995);
- The Japanese Firm: It's Competitive Sources, (co-ed with R Dore), (Oxford University Press, 1994, trans. Japanese);
- The Japanese Main Bank System and its Relevancy for Developing and Transforming Economies, (co-edited with H Patrick), (Oxford University Press, 1994, trans. Japanese and Chinese);
- Corporate Governance in Transitional Economies: Insider Control and Roles of Banks, (ed.) (The World Bank, 1994, trans Chinese, Vietnamese, and Russian);
- Information, Corporate Governance, and Institutional Diversity: Japan, US, and Transitional Economies in Comparative Perspective (Oxford 2000, original Japanese 1995);
- The Role of Government in East Asian Economic Development: Comparative Institutional Analysis, (co-ed with H Kim and M Okuno-Fujiwara), (Oxford University Press, 1997, trans Chinese and Japanese);
- Communities and Markets in Economic Development, (co-ed with Y Hayami), (Oxford University Press, 2001);
- Toward A Comparative Institutional Analysis (MIT Press, 1992. trans. Japanese 2001, Chinese 20001, French 2002).
- Corporate Governance in Japan, with Gregory Jackson and Hideaki Miyajima (Oxford University Press, 2008).
- Corporations in Evolving Diversity (Oxford University Press, 2010).
- The Chinese Economy: A New Transition, with Jinglian Wu (Palgrave Macmillan 2012).
- Complexity and Institutions: Markets, Norms and Corporations, with Kenneth Binmore, Simon Deakin, and Herbert Gintis (Palgrave Macmillan 2012).
- Institutions and Comparative Economic Development, with Timur Kuran and Gérard Roland (Palgrave Macmillan 2012).
- The Global Macro Economy and Finance, with Franklin Allen, Nobuhiro Kiyotaki and Roger Gordon (Palgrave Macmillan 2012).
