= Thomas Nixon Carver =

American economics professor (1865–1961)

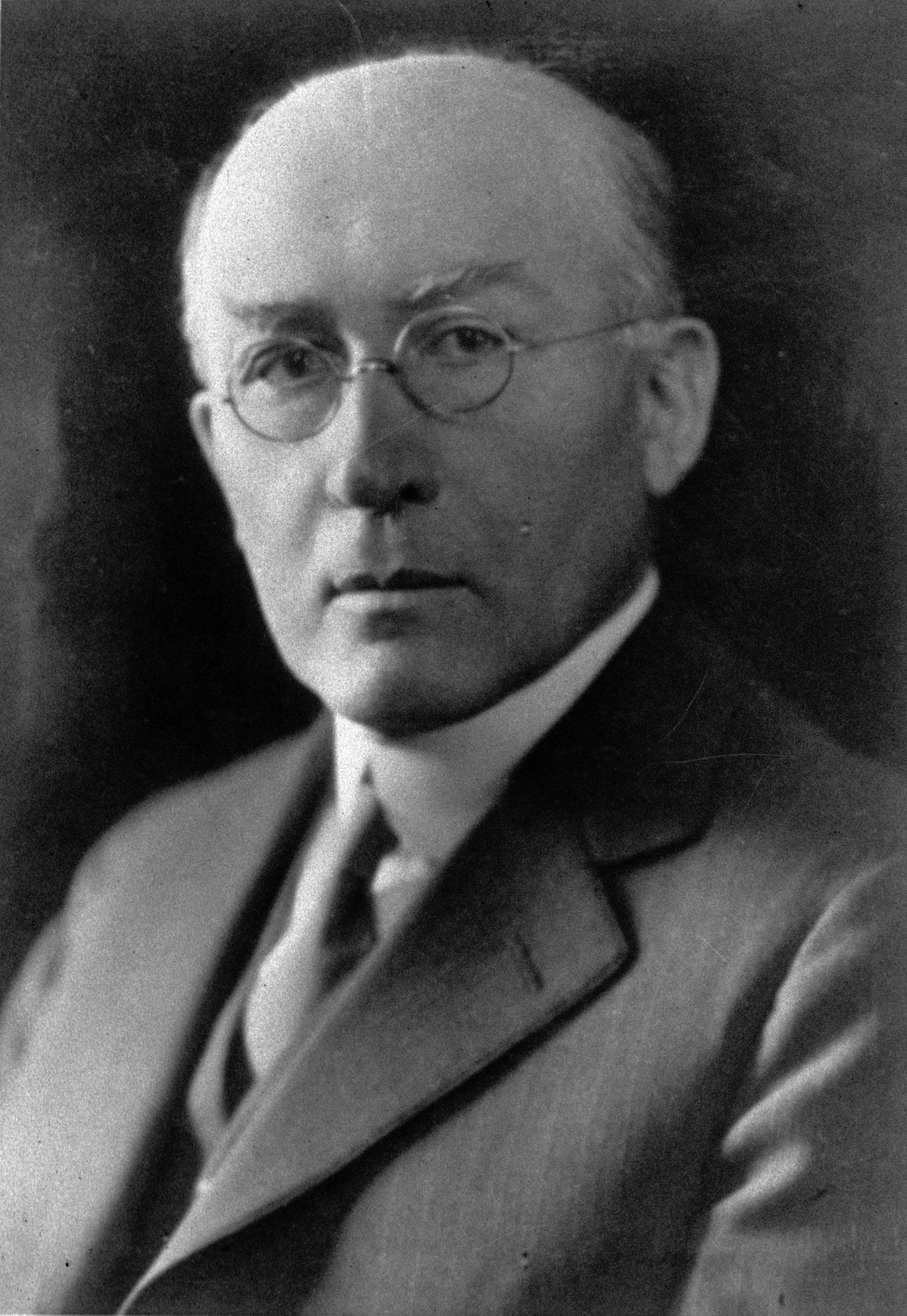
- Thomas Nixon Carver, 1935
- Born: 25 March 1865; Kirkville, Iowa
- Died: 8 March 1961 (aged 95); Santa Monica, California

Academic background
- Education: Cornell University
- Doctoral advisor: Walter Francis Willcox

Academic work
- School or tradition: Neoclassical economics
- Institutions: Oberlin College; Harvard University
- Doctoral students: Albert B. Wolfe

Thomas Nixon Carver (25 March 1865 – 8 March 1961) was an American economics professor and president of the American Economic Association.

== Early life ==
He grew up on a farm, the son of Quaker parents. He received an undergraduate education at Iowa Wesleyan College and the University of Southern California. After studying under John Bates Clark and Richard T. Ely at Johns Hopkins University, he received a PhD degree at Cornell University under Walter Francis Willcox in 1894.

== Career ==
He held a joint appointment in economics and sociology at Oberlin College until 1902, when he accepted a position as professor of political economy at Harvard University (1902–1935). For a time, there he taught the only course in sociology. He was the secretary-treasurer of the American Economic Association (1909–1913) and was elected its president in 1916.

Carver's principal achievement in economic theory was to extend Clark's theory of marginalism to determination of interest from saving ('abstinence') and productivity of capital. He made pioneering contributions to agricultural and rural economics and in rural sociology. He wrote on such diverse topics as monetary economics, macroeconomics, the distribution of wealth, the problem of evil, uses of religion, political science, political economy, social justice, behavioral economics, social evolution, and the economics of national survival.

== Works ==
=== Books ===
- (1893). The Place of Abstinence in the Theory of Interest.
- (1894). The Theory of Wages Adjusted to Recent Theories of Value.
- (1904). Distribution of Wealth. New York: Macmillan. 1924 – via Internet Archive.
- (1905). Sociology and Social Progress.
- (1910). Rural Economy as a Factor in the Success of the Church.
- (1911). Principles of Rural Economics.
- (1911). The Religion Worth Having.
- (1915). Essays in Social Justice.
- (1916). Selected Readings in Rural Economics.
- (1916). Selected Writings in Rural Economics.
- (1917). The Foundations of National Prosperity.
- (1918). Agricultural Economics.
- (1919). Government Control of the Liquor Business in Great Britain and the United States.
- (1919). Principles of Political Economy.
- (1919). War Thrift.
- (1920). Elementary Economics [with Maude Carmichael].
- (1921). Principles of National Economy.
- (1923). Human Relations: An Introduction to Sociology [with Henry Bass Hall].
- (1924). The Economy of Human Energy.
- (1925). The Present Economic Revolution in the United States.
- (1927). Principles of Rural Sociology [with Gustav A. Lundquist].
- (1928). Economic World and How It May Be Improved [with Hugh W. Lester].
- (1932). Our Economic Life.
- (1935). The Essential Factors of Social Evolution.
- Carver, Thomas Nixon; Woolman, Mary Schenck; McGowan, Ellen Beers (1935). Textile Problems for the Consumer. New York: Macmillan. OCLC 19422000 – via HathiTrust.
- (1949). Recollections of an Unplanned Life – via HathiTrust.

=== Sole author journal articles ===
- Carver, T. N. (1895). "The Ethical Basis of Distribution and Its Bearings on Taxation". Publications of the American Economic Association. 10 (3): 96–101. JSTOR 2485647.
- Carver, T. N. (1902). "The Economic Interpretation of History". Journal of Political Economy. 11 (1): 93–98. doi:10.1086/250899. JSTOR 1822622. S2CID 154762716.
- Carver, T. N. (1905). "The Marginal Theory of Distribution". Journal of Political Economy. 13 (2): 257–266. doi:10.1086/251130. JSTOR 1817546. S2CID 154729329.
- Carver, T. N. (1913). "Review of Economic Beginnings of the Far West. How We Won the Land Beyond the Mississippi". The American Economic Review. 3 (2): 353–355. JSTOR 1827962.
- Carver, T. N. (1914). "The Work of Rural Organization". Journal of Political Economy. 22 (9): 821–844. doi:10.1086/252536. JSTOR 1817809. S2CID 154752048.

Carver also co-wrote a number of journal articles, presided over conference presentations, and published in conference proceedings.
