= Fritz Machlup =

Austrian economist (1902–1983)

- Born: Friedrich Eduard Machlup; December 15, 1902; Wiener-Neustadt, Austria-Hungary
- Died: January 30, 1983 (aged 80); Princeton, New Jersey, U.S.

Academic background
- Education: University of Vienna (Dr. rer. pol, 1923)
- Doctoral advisor: Ludwig von Mises
- Influences: Friedrich von Wieser; Ludwig von Mises; Friedrich Hayek

Academic work
- School or tradition: Austrian School
- Institutions: New York University (1971–83); Princeton University (1960–71); Johns Hopkins University (1947–59); University at Buffalo (1935–47)
- Doctoral students: Edith Penrose; Merton Miller; John Chipman; Robert Eisner
- Notable ideas: Information society Half-life of knowledge

Signature
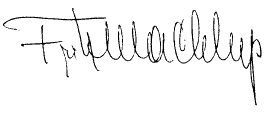

Fritz Machlup (/ˈmɑːklʌp/; German: [ˈmaxluːp]; born Friedrich Eduard Machlup; December 15, 1902 – January 30, 1983) was an Austrian-American economist known for his work in information economics. He was President of the International Economic Association from 1971 to 1974. He was one of the first economists to examine knowledge as an economic resource, and is credited with popularising the concept of the information society.

== Early life and career ==
Machlup was born to Jewish parents in Wiener-Neustadt, then in the Austro-Hungarian Empire. His father was a businessman who owned two factories that manufactured cardboard. In 1920, he began studying economics at the University of Vienna, where he received his dr.rer.pol in 1923. At Vienna, he attended lectures by Friedrich von Wieser, and participated in seminars organised by Ludwig von Mises.

In 1933, he moved to the United States, where he was a research fellow at the Rockefeller Foundation from 1933 to 1935. After the Nazi seizure of Austria in 1938, Machlup remained in the United States, and became a naturalised citizen of the US in 1940. He was the Frank H. Goodyear Professor of Economics at the University at Buffalo from 1935 to 1947, and held visiting positions at various universities around the US, including Harvard, Columbia, and Stanford.

From 1947 to 1960, he was the Abram G. Hutzler Professor of Political Economy at Johns Hopkins University, during which time he served as a research fellow at the Ford Foundation in 1957–58. He was the Walker Professor of Economics and International Finance at Princeton University between 1960 and 1971, where he also directed the International Finance Section. He was a consultant to the Treasury Department from 1965 to 1977. From 1971 till his death in 1983, he was a professor of economics at New York University. His key work was The Production and Distribution of Knowledge in the United States (1962), which is credited with popularizing the concept of the information society.

Machlup was elected to the American Academy of Arts and Sciences in 1961, and the American Philosophical Society in 1963. He served as President of the American Economic Association in 1966, and was President of the International Economic Association from 1971 to 1974.

Shortly before his death, he completed the third in a series of ten planned volumes collectively called Knowledge: Its Creation, Distribution, and Economic Significance. Machlup also helped form the Bellagio Group in the early 1960s, and joined its direct successor, the Group of Thirty, in 1979.

== Major works ==
- Die Goldkernwährung, 1925. (dissertation under Ludwig von Mises)
- "Transfer and Price Effects", 1930, ZfN.
- The Stock Market, Credit and Capital Formation, 1931. (online e-book)
- "The Liquidity of Short-Term Capital", 1932, Economica.
- "A Note on Fixed Costs", 1934, Quarterly Journal of Economics (QJE).
- "Professor Knight and the Period of Production", 1935, Journal of Political Economy (JPE).
- "The Commonsense of the Elasticity of Substitution", 1935, Review of Economic Studies (RES).
- Machlup, Fritz (15 January 1935). "The Consumption of Capital in Austria". The Review of Economics and Statistics. 17 (1): 13–19. doi:10.2307/1928519. JSTOR 1928519.
- "The Rate of Interest as Cost Factor and as a Capitalization Factor", 1935, American Economic Review (AER).
- "Why Bother with Methodology?", 1936, Economica.
- "On the Meaning of Marginal Product", 1937, Explorations in Economics.
- "Monopoly and Competition: A clarification of market positions", 1937, AER.
- "Evaluation of Practical Significance of the Theory of Monopolistic Competition", 1939, AER.
- "Period Analysis and Multiplier Theory", 1939, QJE.
- "The Theory of Foreign Exchange", 1939–40, Economica.
- "Eight Questions on Gold", 1941, AER.
- "Forced or Induced Savings: An exploration into its synonyms and homonyms", 1943, Review of Economics and Statistics (REStat).
- International Trade and the National Income Multiplier, 1943. (online e-book)
- "Marginal Analysis and Empirical Research", 1946, AER.
- "A Rejoinder to an Anti-Marginalist", 1947, AER.
- "Monopolistic Wage Determination as a Part of the General Problem of Monopoly", 1947, in Wage Determination and the Economics of Liberalism.
- "Elasticity Pessimism in International Trade", 1950, Economia Internazionale.
- "Three Concepts of the Balance of Payments and the So-Called Dollar Shortage", 1950, The Economic Journal (EJ).
- "Schumpeter's Economic Methodology", 1951, REStat.
- The Political Economy of Monopoly, 1952 (online e-book).
- "The Characteristics and Classification of Oligopoly", 1952, Kyklos.
- The Economics of Sellers' Competition, 1952 (online e-book).
- "Dollar Shortage and Disparities in the Growth of Productivity", 1954, Scottish JPE.
- "The Problem of Verification in Economics", 1955, Southern EJ.
- "Characteristics and Types of Price Discrimination", 1955, in Stigler, editor, Business Concentration and Price Policies.
- "Relative Prices and Aggregate Spending in the Analysis of Devaluation", 1955, AER.
- "The Inferiority Complex of the Social Sciences", 1956, in Sennholz, editor, On Freedom and Free Enterprise.
- "The Terms-of-Trade Effects of Devaluation upon Real Income and the Balance of Trade", 1956, Kyklos.
- "Professor Hicks' Revision of Demand Theory", 1957, AER.
- "Disputes, Paradoxes and Dilemmas Concerning Economic Development", 1957, RISE.
- "Equilibrium and Disequilibrium: Misplaced concreteness and disguised politics", 1958, EJ.
- "Can There Be Too Much Research?", 1958, Science.
- "Structure and Structural Change: Weaselwords and jargon", 1958, ZfN.
- "The Optimum Lag of Imitation Behind Innovation", 1958, Festskrift til Frederik Zeuthen.
- "Statics and Dynamics: Kaleidoscopic words", 1959, Southern EJ.
- Micro and Macro-Economics: Contested boundaries and claims of superiority, 1960.
- "Operational Concepts and Mental Constructs in Model and Theory Formation", 1960, GdE.
- "The Supply of Inventors and Inventions", 1960, WWA.
- "Another View of Cost-Push and Demand-Pull Inflation", 1960, REStat.
- "Are the Social Sciences Really Inferior?", 1961, Southern EJ.
- The Production and Distribution of Knowledge in the United States, 1962.
- Essays in Economic Semantics, 1963.
- "Conceptos operativos y constructos mentales en la elaboración de los modelos y de la teoría", 1963, Estudios económicos. Bahía Blanca, Argentina.
- "Why Economists Disagree", 1964, Proceedings of APS.
- International Payments, Debts and Gold, 1964.
- "The Cloakroom Rule of International Reserve Creation and Resources Transfer", 1965, QJE.
- "Adjustment, Compensatory Correction and Financing of Imbalances in International Payments", 1965, in Baldwin et al., Trade, Growth and the Balance of Payments.
- "The Need for Monetary Reserves", 1966, Banca Nazionale del Lavoro, Quarterly Review (BNLQR).
- "Operationalism and Pure Theory in Economics", in Krupp, editor, The Structure of Economics.
- "Corporate Management, National Interest and Behavioral Theory", 1967, JPE.
- "Theories of the Firm: Marginalist, behavioral and managerial", 1967, AER.
- "If Matter Could Talk", 1969, in Morgenbesser et al., editors, Philosophy, Science and Methodology.
- "Liberalism and Choice of Freedoms", 1969, in Streissler et al., editors, Roads to Freedom: Essays in honor of Friedrich A. von Hayek.
- "Eurodollar Creation: A mystery story", 1970, BNLQR.
- "Homo Oeconomicus and His Class Mates", 1970, in Natanson, editor, Phenomenology and Social Reality.
- "The Universal Bogey", 1972, in Preston and Corry, editors, Essays in Honor of Lord Robbins.
- "Friedrich von Hayek's Contributions to Economics", 1974, Swedish JE.
- "A History of Thought on Economic Integration", 1977, Columbia University Press.
- "Knowledge: Its Creation, Distribution and Economic Significance", Princeton University Press.
  - Vol. 1: Knowledge and Knowledge Production, 1981
  - Vol. 2:The Branches of Learning, 1982
  - Vol. 3: The Economics of Information and Human Capital, 1984
- Machlup, Fritz (November 1984). "Por qué discrepan los economistas". Estudios económicos. 3 (5/6): 69–82. doi:10.52292/j.estudecon.1984.907.
