= Joseph S. Davis =

American economist

- Born: November 5, 1885; Frazer, Pennsylvania
- Died: April 23, 1975 (aged 89); Los Altos, California

Academic background
- Education: Harvard University
- Doctoral advisor: Charles J. Bullock

Academic work
- Discipline: Agricultural economics
- Institutions: Food Research Institute, Stanford University

Joseph Stancliffe Davis (November 5, 1885 – April 23, 1975) was an American economist. He was a professor of economics at Stanford University and a long-time director of the newly established Food Research Institute. In 1944, he served as president of the American Economic Association. He was a member of President Eisenhower's Council of Economic Advisers.

He was born in Chester County, Pennsylvania, and graduated from Harvard University 1908 and was awarded the Doctorate of Philosophy in 1913.
