= International Economic Association =

NGO which promotes economic research

- Abbreviation: IEA
- Formation: 1950
- Legal status: Non-Governmental Organization
- Purpose: Encourage research, publication, and free discussion of economic topics
- Headquarters: Barcelona, Catalonia, Spain
- Region served: Worldwide
- Members: 68
- President: Kaushik Basu(India)
- Main organ: Executive Committee
- Website: IEA Official website

The International Economic Association (IEA) is an NGO established in 1950, at the instigation of the Social Sciences Department of UNESCO. To date, the IEA still shares information and maintains consultative relations with UNESCO. In 1973 the IEA became a federated member of the International Social Science Council.

The goal of the IEA is to promote personal contacts and mutual understanding among economists in different parts of the world through the organization of scientific meetings, through common research programs and by means of publications of an international character on problems of current importance.

== Organization ==
The IEA has two main bodies which rule the association: the council and the executive committee.

=== Council ===
The IEA is governed by a council, composed of representatives of all member associations as well as a limited number of co-opted members. The council meets triennially, when it reviews the general policy of the association and elects the president and other officers and members of the executive committee for a three-year term of office.

=== Executive committee ===
The executive committee, which numbers 15 members (and 3 advisors), decides, in the light of the general policies approved by the council, the subjects of specialists' conferences and other projects and selects the chairman of the Program Committee who will be entrusted with the scientific preparation of each project. The general practice is to invoke the aid of an economist of outstanding distinction in the subject who, with other members of the Committee chosen by him in consultation with the IEA officers and executive committee, undertakes the scientific planning of the program and is responsible for the subsequent publication. Decisions concerning the work of the association are taken by the president, in consultation with the other officers, the executive committee frequently being consulted.

==== Executive committee members ====
As of June 2026, following the Belgrade congress, the members of the executive committee are a follows:

Position	Name
President	Elhanan Helpman
President-elect	Eric Maskin
Vice President	Wendy Carlin
Treasurer	Omar Licandro
Secretary General	Lili Yan Ing
Past President	Dani Rodrik
Past past President	Kaushik Basu

== Assembles and Presidents ==
General assembles and Presidents
Nr.	Year	Location		Presidents		
21.	2026	Belgrade	Serbia	27.	2026–	Eric Maskin United States
20.	2023	Medellín	Colombia	26.	2023–2026	Elhanan Helpman Israel & United States
19.	2021	Bali	Indonesia	25.	2021–2023	Dani Rodrik Turkey & United States
18.	2017	Mexico City	Mexico	24.	2017–2021	Kaushik Basu India
17.	2014	Dead Sea	Jordan	23.	2014–2017	Timothy Besley United Kingdom
16.	2011	Beijing	China	22.	2011–2014	Joseph E. Stiglitz United States
15.	2008	Istanbul	Turkey	21.	2008–2011	Masahiko Aoki Japan
14.	2005	Marrakesh	Morocco	20.	2005–2008	Guillermo Calvo United States
13.	2002	Lisbon	Portugal	19.	2002–2005	János Kornai Hungary
12.	1999	Buenos Aires	Argentina	18.	1999–2002	Robert M. Solow United States
11.	1995	Tunis	Tunisia	17.	1995–1999	Jacques Drèze Belgium
10.	1992	Moscow	Russia	16.	1992–1995	Michael Peter Bruno Israel
9.	1989	Athens	Greece	15.	1989–1992	Anthony B. Atkinson United Kingdom
8.	1986	New Delhi	India	14.	1986–1989	Amartya Sen India
7.	1983	Madrid	Spain	13.	1983–1986	Kenneth Arrow United States
6.	1980	Mexico	Mexico	12.	1980–1983	Victor L. Urquidi Mexico
5.	1977	Tokyo	Japan	11.	1977–1980	Shigeto Tsuru Japan
4.	1974	Budapest	Hungary	10.	1974–1977	Edmond Malinvaud France
				9.	1971–1974	Fritz Machlup United States
3.	1968	Montreal	Canada	8.	1968–1971	Erik Lundberg Sweden
				7.	1965–1968	Paul A. Samuelson United States
2.	1962	Vienna	Austria	6.	1962–1965	G. Ugo Papi Italy
				5.	1959–1962	Edward Austin G. Robinson United States
1.	1956	Rome	Italy	4.	1956–1959	Erik Lindahl Sweden
				3.	1953–1956	Howard S. Ellis United States
				2.	1950–1953	Gottfried Haberler Austria & United States
x	1950			1.	1950 (interim)	Joseph Alois Schumpeter Austria & United States

== Membership ==
The IEA is in effect a federation of national academic associations or committees representing the economists of each country. In 2020 it had 30 member countries and 8 association countries. In the implementation of each project, invitations are sent to those individuals or research institutes—regardless of nationality—that appear in the circumstances to be best qualified to make a serious contribution to the study of the subject chosen.

== Activities ==
Regional conferences have been held in various parts of the world to study problems particular to the region. East-West conferences have provided an opportunity for economists from Eastern and Western Europe to meet and discuss problems of common interest.

Particular attention has been paid also to problems of concern to developing countries by devoting whole conferences or sections of conferences and congresses to these problems. In the case of the developing countries considerable efforts have been made, often with the help of subsidies from UNESCO, the World Bank and the European Commission and international organizations to facilitate the participation of economists from these countries in the work of the IEA.

In essence, the activities of the IEA during the 65 years of its existence may be summed up as follows:

1. The organization of 115 specialists' conferences of a round-table type and the publication of 154 volumes of proceedings.

2. The organization of fifteen open international congresses: Rome 1956, Vienna 1962, Montreal 1968, Budapest 1974, Tokyo 1977, Mexico 1980, Madrid 1983, New Delhi 1986, Athens 1989, Moscow 1992, Tunis 1995, Buenos Aires 1999, Lisbon, 2002, Marrakesh, 2005, Istanbul, Turkey, June 2008, Beijing, China, July 2011 and Dead Sea, Jordan, 2014. Each of the Congresses was followed by some volumes of proceedings published by Palgrave Macmillan.
