= Albert B. Wolfe =

American economist (1876–1967)

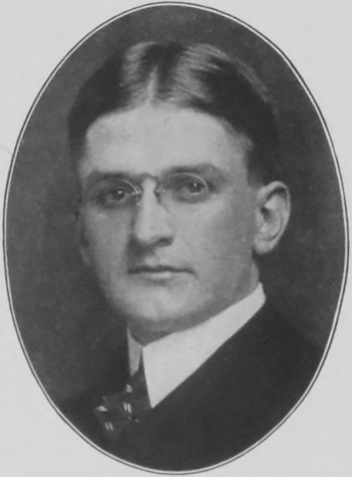
- Born: August 23, 1876; Arlington, Illinois, US
- Died: June 3, 1967 (aged 90); Columbus, Ohio, US

Academic background
- Education: Harvard University
- Thesis: The Lodging House Problem in Boston (1905)
- Doctoral advisor: Thomas Nixon Carver

Academic work
- Discipline: Economics

Albert Benedict Wolfe (August 23, 1876 – June 3, 1967) was an American economist.

== Life ==
Wolfe was born in 1876. He died in 1967.

== Career ==
He has served as a president of the American Economic Association.

== Bibliography ==
Some of his books are:

- Conservatism, Radicalism, and Scientific Method: An Essay on Social Attitudes. Macmillan. 1923.ISBN 978-1258237325
- The Lodging House Problem in Boston. Houghton, Mifflin. 1913.ISBN 978-1141697380
  - Dewsnup, E. R. (1907). "Reviewed Work: The Lodging-House Problem in Boston". Journal of Political Economy. 15 (3): 179–81. doi:10.1086/251304. JSTOR 1817451.
- Readings in social problems ISBN 978-1146799607
  - J. G. S. (1917). "Reviewed Work: Readings in Social Problems". The Annals of the American Academy of Political and Social Science. 70 (1): 332. doi:10.1177/000271621707000150. JSTOR 1013633. S2CID 220723218.
- Savers' surplus and the interest rate
- Social problems, an analytical outline for students
- Works committees and Joint industrial councils
