= Carl C. Plehn =

American economist

Carl Copping Plehn (January 20, 1867 – July 21, 1945) was an American economist. He was a professor of public finance at the University of California, Berkeley, from 1893 to 1937. In 1923, he served as the 25th president of the American Economic Association.

A native of Providence, Rhode Island, Plehn earned his bachelor's degree from Brown University in 1889. He then pursued graduate education at the University of Göttingen in Germany, graduating with a PhD in 1891.
