= Ernest L. Bogart =

American economist

- Born: March 16, 1870
- Died: November 4, 1958 (aged 88)

Academic background
- Education: University of Halle-Wittenberg; Princeton University
- Doctoral advisor: Johannes Conrad

Ernest Ludlow Bogart (March 16, 1870 in Yonkers, New York – November 4, 1958) was an American economist. He was a professor of economics at the University of Illinois at Urbana–Champaign from 1909 to 1938. In 1931, he served as president of the American Economic Association.
