= Robert Eisner =

American economist

- Born: January 17, 1922; New York City
- Died: November 25, 1998 (aged 76); Evanston, Illinois

Academic background
- Education: Columbia University; Johns Hopkins University
- Doctoral advisors: Evsey Domar; Fritz Machlup
- Influences: John Maynard Keynes

Academic work
- School or tradition: Neo-Keynesian economics
- Institutions: Northwestern University; University of Illinois at Urbana-Champaign
- Notable ideas: Macroeconomics business cycles

Robert Eisner (January 17, 1922 – November 25, 1998) was an American author and William R. Kenan professor of economics at Northwestern University. He was recognized throughout the United States for his expertise and knowledge of macroeconomics and the economics of business cycles. He was a regular contributor to the Wall Street Journal, The New York Times, Chicago Tribune, and The Los Angeles Times, primarily covering national economic policy and reform.

In 1972, he served as an adviser to George McGovern, during his campaign for the United States Presidency. In 1988, he was elected as the president of the American Economic Association. He was also the co-founder of the Committee on the Status of Women in the Economic Profession. In 1992, he served as an advisor on economic policy to US President Bill Clinton.

== Personal background ==
Robert Eisner was born in New York City on January 17, 1922. He was raised in Brooklyn. His father was a high school principal, and his mother a teacher, which served as a catalyst in his early graduation from high school by the time he was 14 years old. Following his high school graduation, he attended City College of New York, where he earned an undergraduate degree in history in 1940. He later earned his Master's degree in sociology, from Columbia University in 1942.

In 1942, Eisner enlisted in the US Army. He was stationed in France during World War II. He went through the Army's basic training in North Carolina. While there, he met Edith Avery Chelimer, who was attending Duke University. They were married in 1946, following his discharge from the military. Together, they had two daughters, Emily is a lawyer with the Cook County, Illinois Public Defender's Office, while Mary is the legislative director for Kent Conrad.

Following his service, Eisner attended Johns Hopkins University in Baltimore, financed through the GI Bill. In 1951, he received his Ph.D. in economics and subsequently moved to Illinois, where he joined the faculty at the University of Illinois at Urbana-Champaign. In 1952, he moved on to Northwestern.

Eisner died on November 25, 1998, at his home in Evanston, Illinois, from complications from a bone marrow disorder.

== Professional background ==
Eisner was a Keynesian economist and member of the faculty of Northwestern University for over 42 years, serving as chairman of the Economics Department.

Eisner is known for his contributions to understanding investment, consumption behavior, macroeconomic theory, and fiscal and monetary policy. He published extensively in academic journals, including the American Economic Review, Review of Economics and Statistics, Quarterly Journal of Economics, Econometrica, Economic Journal, Survey of Current Business, and Review of Income and Wealth.

== Honors and awards ==
Eisner was recognized as a fellow of the American Academy of Arts and Sciences, as well as the Econometric Society. He was also the 15th recipient of the John R. Commons Award of Omicron Delta Epsilon, known as the International Honor Society of Economics. He was a Guggenheim Fellow for the academic year 1959–1960.

Following his death, the Roycemore School of Evanston established the Robert Eisner Distinguished Scholar Program in his memory. At Northwestern University, the Robert Eisner Graduate Fellowship was established to recognize the top graduate student who has distinguished him or herself in both teaching and research. The fellowship is the Department of Economics' highest honor bestowed on a graduate student during their fourth year of studies. The recipient of the award is provided with tuition and stipend for the fall, winter, and spring quarters at the school.

== Published works ==
=== Books ===
- Social Security: More Not Less, New York: Century Foundation Press, (1998). ISBN 978-0-87078-416-3
- The Misunderstood Economy: What Counts and How to Count It, Harvard Business Press (1995). ISBN 978-0-87584-642-2
- The Total Incomes System of Accounts, University Of Chicago Press, (1989). ISBN 978-0-226-19638-1
- How Real Is the Federal Deficit?, New York: The Free Press, (1986). ISBN 978-0-02-909430-3
- Determinants of Business Investment, Prentice-Hall (1963). ASIN B0007HG9EM
- The Great Deficit Scare: The Federal Budget, Trade, and Social Security, Twentieth Century Foundation, (1997). ISBN 978-0-87078-411-8
- Factors of Business Investment (General series – National Bureau of Economic Research; no. 102, HarperCollins, (1979). ISBN 978-0-88410-484-1
- Investment, National Income and Economic Policy (Economists of the Twentieth Century) v. 2, Edward Elgar Pub, (1998). ISBN 978-1-85898-847-4
- The Keynesian Revolution, Then and Now: The Selected Essays of Robert Eisner Volume One (Economists of the Twentieth Century) v. 1, Edward Elgar Pub, (1999). ISBN 978-1-85898-846-7

=== Economic journals ===
- "The NAIRU and Fiscal and Monetary Policy for Now and Our Future", Seminar Paper No. 1, Center for Full Employment and Price Stability (January 2000)
- "State of the Union: Black Holes in the Statistics", Challenge (January–February 1997): 615
- "Divergences of Measurement and Theory and Some Implications for Economic Policy." Presidential address to the American Economic Association, New York (December 29, 1988), American Economic Review, 79 (March 1989): 113
- "The Total Incomes System of Accounts", Survey of Current Business, 65 (January 1985): 2448
- "Transfers in a Total Incomes System of Accounts", Economic Transfers in the United States Studies in Income and Wealth, vol. 49, edited by Marilyn Moon, 936. Chicago: University of Chicago Press, 1984
- "Total Incomes in the United States, 194676: A Summary Report", Review of Income and Wealth, series 28 (June 1982): 133174
- "An Extended Measure of Government Product: Preliminary Results for the United States, 194676", Review of Income and Wealth, series 27 (March 1981): 3364
- "Capital Gains and Income: Real Changes in the Value of Capital in the United States, 194677," The Measurement of Capital, Studies in Income and Wealth, vol. 45, edited by Dan Usher, 175342. Chicago: University of Chicago Press, 1980
- "Limitations and Potentials of Countercyclical Fiscal and Monetary Policies", Business Cycle and Public Policy, 1980
- "Total Income, Total Expenditure and Growth", American Economic Review, 1980
- "Total Incomes in the United States, 1959 and 1969", Review of Income and Wealth, series 24, (March 1978): 4170
- "A Framework for the Measurement of Economic and Social Performance", The Measurement of Economic and Social Performance, Studies in Income and Wealth, vol. 38, 99102, New York: Columbia University Press, 1973
- "Components of Capital Expenditure: Replacement and modernization versus expansion", Revue of Economics and Statistics, 1972
- "New Twists to Income and Product." In The Economic Accounts of the United States: Retrospect and Prospect. Survey of Current Business, 51, part II, 50th anniversary issue (July 1971): 6768.
- "Investment and the Frustrations of Econometricians," American Economic Review, 1969.
- "Investment Behavior and Neoclassical Theory," with M.I. Nadiri, Review of Economics and Statistics, 1968.
- "Capital and Labor in Production: Some Direct Estimates." In The Theory and Empirical Analysis of Production. Studies in Income and Wealth, vol. 31, edited by Murray Brown, 431462. New York: Columbia University Press, 1967.
- "The Permanent Income Theory for Investment: Some empirical explorations", American Economic Review, 1967
- "Realization of Investment Anticipations", Brookings Quarterly Model, 1965
- "Capital Expenditures, Profits and the Acceleration Principle", Models of Income Determination, 1964
- "Capacity, Investment and Profits," Quarterly Journal of Economics, 1964.
- "Investment: Fact and fancy," American Economic Review, 1963.
- "Investment Plans and Realizations", American Economic Review, 1962
- "A Distributed Lag Investment Function", Econometrica, 1960
- "On Growth Models and the Neo-Classical Resurgence", Economic Journal, 1958
- "The Permanent Income Hypothesis: Comment", American Economic Review, 1958
- "Studies in Income and Wealth", vol. 19, 513584. Princeton: Princeton University Press, 1957
- "Determinants of Capital Expenditures: An interview study", 1956
- "Studies in Income and Wealth", vol. 17, 484488. Princeton: Princeton University Press, 1955
- "The Contribution of Consumer Anticipations in Forecasting Consumer Demand", Short-Term Economic Forecasting
- "Interview and Other Survey Techniques and the Study of Investment", Problems of Capital Formation
- "Federal Debt". Concise Encyclopedia of Economics (1st ed.). Library of Economics and Liberty. 1993. OCLC 317650570, 50016270, 163149563
