= Domar aggregation =

Approach to aggregating growth measures

Domar aggregation is an approach to aggregating growth measures associated with industries to make larger sector or national aggregate growth rates. The issue comes up in the context of national accounts and multifactor productivity (MFP) statistics.

The objective is to construct the growth rate of an aggregate MFP residual, a sector or national total, as a weighted average of the growth rates of the MFP residuals of its component industries or firms, usually to discuss how industry-specific changes affected the aggregate. The weights on each industry are called Domar weights. The Domar weight for each industry when adding their MFPs together is the ratio of the nominal value of each industry's gross output to GDP, the sum of value-added output of all the industries together. The objective is to properly account for effects of productivity changes in intermediate goods and industries whose goods are both output and inputs for other industries. The term "market value of the industry's output" can be used in place of the accounting term "gross output."

By construction, Domar weights sum up to a figure larger than 1.0, because the revenue of some firms comes from the sales of intermediate to other firms so some revenues are multiply counted in the firm by firm accounting, in the numerators of the Domar weights, but are netted out in GDP. Example: a tire-maker's sales might go mainly to the makers of cars, trucks, bicycles, and so forth who sell their products with tires included, so tire revenues are multiply counted.

== History ==
This methodology was introduced by Evsey Domar (1961). Economist Charles Hulten developed this theory more formally in a model of a closed economy.

Hulten (1978) used "observed expenditure shares" as weights, and in that model "the first-order impact on output of a TFP shock to a firm or an industry is equal to that industry or firm’s sales as a share of output." Hulten's framing became standard.

== National accounting variations ==
Reinsdorf and Yuskavage (2010, p. 88) evaluate several ways to summarize and decompose industry and regional data to national data flows on productivity change:

A Domar weighted decomposition of translog aggregate multi-factor productivity growth that includes reallocation effects was developed by Jorgenson, Gollop and Fraumeni (1987, p. 66) and used in modified form by Jorgenson, Ho and Stiroh (2002, p. 9.)

Domar weights are ratios . . . of industry gross output to aggregate value added. Domar weights are required to decompose multifactor productivity growth (see [Gullickson] and Harper, 1999, p. 51.) . . . The Domar contribution of an industry to productivity change can be described as the sum of an output change contribution and an input change contribution. . . .

In the models of Baqaee and Farhi, revenue-based Domar weights are defined for producer firms by their "sales share", their revenue divided by GDP, the traditional Domar weight. In these models, which include price/cost markups by the producing firms (imperfect competition), the authors show that an analogous concept which they call cost-based Domar weights more accurately apportions productivity when aggregating to the national aggregate level. In a simpler model, Hall (1990) had a similar result. The Baqaee-Farhi approach enables a growth accounting in which (1) input factors like labor, capital, and energy can have Domar weights, just as industries or firms do, and (2) it is possible to separately estimate effects of overall technological improvement and of "allocative efficiency" which is higher in perfect competition and lower if price-to-cost markups are large. Markups tend to be higher to the extent that oligopolistic firms have market power.
