= Lili Yan Ing =

Indonesian economist

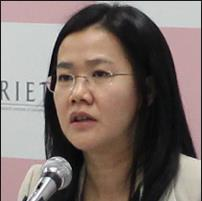
- Occupation: Senior Economist
- Known for: Senior Advisor on Trade and Investment

Lili Yan Ing is an Indonesian economist. She has been the lead advisor to the Minister of Trade of Indonesia since November 2017 until November 2019

Ing was a senior advisor on Trade and Investment at the President’s Office of the Republic of Indonesia from 2015 to 2016. Earlier, she was a senior economist at the Economic Research Institute for ASEAN and East Asia ERIA, and a senior advisor on Trade and Investment for the Southeast Asian region from 2012 to 2015, and an economist with the World Bank, from 2009 to 2012.

She also teaches International Trade at the University of Indonesia and gives public lectures on trade, speaks at international fora such as WTO symposiums, NTM International Expert meetings, the East Asian Business Summit, the ASEAN Business and Investment Summit, and participates in RCEP negotiations, ASEAN—US, ASEAN—EU, ASEAN Senior Economic Official meetings, and ASEAN High Level Task Force meetings, and gives trainings and speeches at a number of conferences related to Southeast Asia. She is also a frequent contributor to leading newspapers including among others, The Diplomat, the Asian Nikkei Review, and the Jakarta Post.
