= Henry B. Gardner =

American economist (1863–1939)

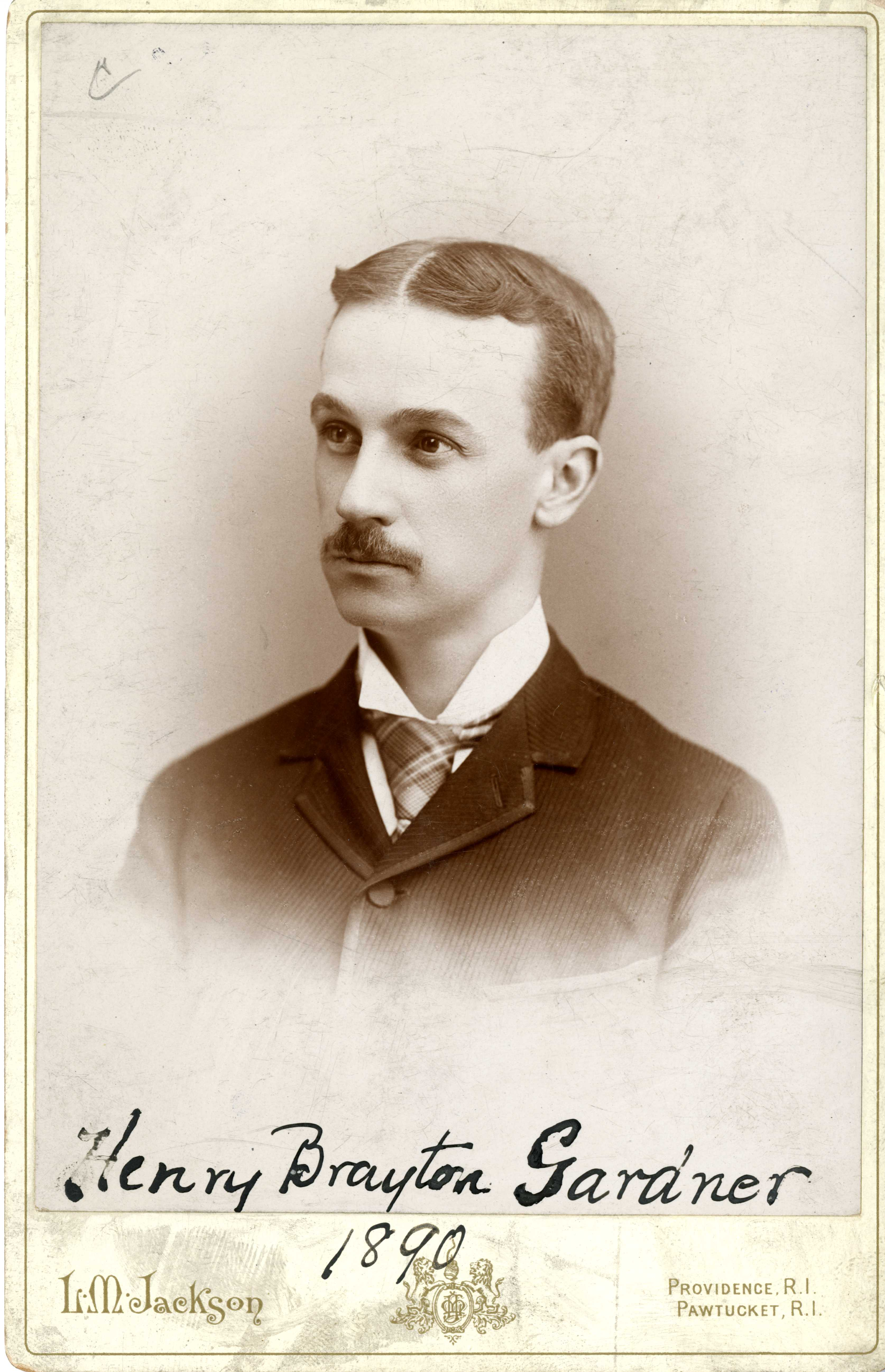
Carte-de-visite, 1890

Henry Brayton Gardner (March 26, 1863 – April 22, 1939) was an American economist. He was a faculty member at Brown University from 1890 until 1928, serving as the first Eastman Professor of Political Economy from 1919 to 1928. In 1919, he served as president of the American Economic Association.

A native of Providence, Rhode Island, Gardner graduated from Brown in 1884 and received his PhD in economics from Johns Hopkins University in 1890.
