= Harry Gardner (footballer) =

Australian rules footballer

Personal information
- Full name: Harry Gardner
- Born: 3 March 1878
- Died: 16 February 1957 (aged 78)
- Original team: South Yarra
- Position: Rover

Playing career^{1}
Years	Club	Games (Goals)
1898, 1900	South Melbourne	5 (0)
- ^{1} Playing statistics correct to the end of 1800.

Harry Gardner (3 March 1878 – 16 February 1957) was an Australian rules footballer who played with South Melbourne in the Victorian Football League (VFL). Although it is recorded that he came from South Yarra, Gardner was recruited from Hawthorn (VJFA).
