= Evsey Domar =

Russian-American economist (1914–1997)

- Born: April 16, 1914; Łódź, Russian Empire (now Poland)
- Died: April 1, 1997 (aged 82); Concord, Massachusetts, U.S.

Academic background
- Education: University of California, Los Angeles; University of Michigan; Harvard University
- Doctoral advisor: Alvin Hansen
- Influences: John Maynard Keynes, John A. Hobson

Academic work
- Discipline: Political economy
- School or tradition: Post-Keynesian economics
- Doctoral students: Robert Eisner; Robert Fogel; Laura Tyson
- Notable ideas: Harrod–Domar model

Evsey David Domar (Russian: Евсей Давидович Домашевицкий, Domashevitsky; April 16, 1914 – April 1, 1997) was a Russian-American economist, famous as developer of the Harrod–Domar model.

== Life ==
Evsey Domar was born on April 16, 1914, in the Polish city of Łódź, which was part of the Russian Empire at that time. He grew up in Manchuria, living in Dairen and Harbin where he attended the State Faculty of Law studying economics, before emigrating to the United States in 1936.

He received a Bachelor of Arts from UCLA in 1939, a Master of Science from the University of Michigan in 1940, a Master of Science from Harvard University in 1943, and a doctorate from Harvard in 1947.

In 1946 Evsey Domar married Carola Rosenthal. The couple had two daughters.

He was a professor at the Carnegie Institute of Technology, The University of Chicago, the Johns Hopkins University and then at the Massachusetts Institute of Technology from 1957 until the end of his career.

Evsey Domar was president of the Association for Comparative Economics and a member of several other academic organizations including the American Academy of Arts and Sciences, the Econometric Society, and the Center for Advanced Study in the Behavioral Sciences. He was on the executive committee of the American Economic Association from 1962 until 1965, and became the organization's vice president in 1970. In 1965, he was the first recipient of the John R. Commons Award, given by the economics honor society Omicron Delta Epsilon.

He worked for the RAND Corporation, the Ford Foundation, the Brookings Institution, the National Science Foundation, the Battelle Memorial Institute, and the Institute for Defense Analysis.

Evsey Domar died on April 1, 1997, in the Emerson Hospital in Concord, Massachusetts 15 days before his 83rd birthday.

== Work ==
Evsey Domar was a Keynesian economist. He made contributions to three main areas of economics: economic history, comparative economics and economic growth. In 1946 he advanced the idea that economic growth served to lighten the deficit and the national debt. During the Cold War he was also an expert on Soviet economics.

He is most known for developing, independently of British economist Roy Forbes Harrod, what has become to be known as the Harrod–Domar model of economic growth. This model was the precursor to the neoclassical model of economic growth, differing mainly in its restrictive assumption that the Leontief production function applied, which meant there would be fixed proportions of capital and labor in production, not substitution between them. In the model, economic growth was unstable. The Solow–Swan model that followed several years later borrowed heavily from the Harrod-Domar model and used a variable proportions Cobb–Douglas production function.

Domar's 1961 paper is cited as the source of Domar aggregation, a set of rules and processes for combining industry growth data together to get aggregate industry sector or national growth.

Among his students was the economic historian Robert Fogel, who was awarded the Nobel Memorial Prize in Economics in 1993.

== Papers ==
- The Burden of the Debt and the National Income, 1944, AER.
- Proportional Income Taxation and Risk-Taking, with Richard Musgrave, 1944.
- Capital Expansion, Rate of Growth and Employment, 1946, Econometrica.
- Expansion and Employment, 1947, AER.
- The Problem of Capital Accumulation, 1948, AER.
- Capital Accumulation and the End of Prosperity, 1949, Proceedings of Internat. Statistical Conference
- The Effect of Foreign Investment on the Balance of Payments, 1950, AER.
- A Theoretical Analysis of Economic Growth, 1952, AER.
- Depreciation, Replacement and Growth, 1953, EJ.
- The Case for Accelerated Depreciation, 1953, QJE.
- Essays in the Theory of Economic Growth, 1957.
- On the Measurement of Technological Change, 1961, The Economic Journal 71:284 (Dec., 1961), 709–729. (jstor)
- The Soviet Collective Farm as a Producer Co-Operative, 1966, AER.
- An Index-Number Tournament, 1967, QJE.
- The Causes of Slavery or Serfdom: A hypothesis, 1969, MIT.
- On The Optimal Compensation of a Socialist Manager, 1972, MIT.
- Poor Old Capitalism, 1974, MIT.
- On the profitability of Russian serfdom, 1982, MIT. (with Mark J. Machina)
- Were the Russian serfs overcharged for their land in 1861? The history of one historical table, 1985, MIT.
- The blind men and the elephant : an essay on isms, 1988, MIT.
