= Edith Penrose =

American-born British economist

- Born: November 15, 1914; Los Angeles, United States
- Died: October 11, 1996 (aged 81); Waterbeach, Cambridgeshire, England
- Known for: Resource-based view

Academic background
- Education: University of California at Berkeley; Johns Hopkins University
- Thesis: The Economics of the International Patent System (1951)
- Doctoral advisor: Fritz Machlup

Academic work
- Institutions: Johns Hopkins University; Baghdad University; London School of Economics; School of Oriental and African Studies; INSEAD
- Notable works: The theory of the growth of the firm

Edith Elura Tilton Penrose (November 15, 1914 – October 11, 1996) was an American-born British economist whose best known work is The Theory of the Growth of the Firm, which describes how firms grow and how quickly they do so. Writing in The Independent, the economist Sir Alec Cairncross stated that the book brought Dr. Penrose "instant recognition as a creative thinker, and its importance to the analysis of the job of management has been increasingly realized".

== Biography ==
=== Personal life ===
Penrose was born on 15 November 1914 at Sunset Boulevard in Los Angeles. She graduated from San Luis Obispo High School and went on to receive a bachelor's degree in 1936 in economics from the University of California at Berkeley. In 1936, she married David Burton Denhardt (1910-1938), who died two years later in a hunting accident, leaving her with an infant son David Tilton Denhardt. She moved to Baltimore, and took her MA and PhD under the supervision of Fritz Machlup at Johns Hopkins University. In 1945, she married Ernest F. Penrose, a British-born economist and writer who had been one of her teachers at Berkeley. After working for the American Embassy in London, she received her doctorate in 1950. In 1984 Penrose received an honorary doctorate from the Faculty of Social Sciences at Uppsala University, Sweden. Her first book, Economics of the International Patent System, was based on her doctoral thesis and was published in 1951.

=== McCarthyism and departure from US ===
Penrose was a lecturer and research associate at Johns Hopkins University for many years. When fellow academic Owen Lattimore was accused by Senator Joseph McCarthy of being a Soviet spy, Penrose and her husband played a central role in his defence. Because of this experience, Penrose became disillusioned with the US and the couple went on sabbatical leave, first to the Australian National University in Canberra, and then to Baghdad University, where she taught for two years and helped set up the economics department.

=== Baghdad and the oil industry ===
While in Baghdad, Penrose saw an opportunity to study the economics of the oil industry. This work culminated in a book, The Large International Firm in Developing Countries: The International Petroleum Industry, which was published in 1968. After the overthrow of the Hashemite monarchy, the couple were expelled from Iraq and drove across the Syrian Desert, through Turkey and on to the UK.

=== Move to UK ===
In 1959, Penrose took a joint Leadership post in economics at the London School of Economics and the School of Oriental and African Studies (SOAS). In 1964, she was appointed chair of economics with special reference to Asia at the SOAS, a post which she held until 1978. During this time, she continued her interest in multinational oil companies, and was travelling extensively. She also became involved in several academic and public bodies, including the Monopolies Commission and was elected a fellow of the Royal Commonwealth Society in 1985.

=== INSEAD ===
At age 64, Penrose retired from SOAS and took up a position as professor of political economy at INSEAD in Fontainebleau, France. When her husband died in 1984, she retired from INSEAD and moved back to the UK, settling at Waterbeach, Cambridgeshire near to her surviving sons.

== Contribution to Economics ==
=== The Theory of the Growth of the Firm ===
Penrose's 1959 book The Theory of the Growth of the Firm examined how and why companies grow.

=== Resource-Based View of the Firm ===
Penrose is considered to be the first economist who posited what has become known as the resource-based view of the firm. Strategic resources are those that are rare, difficult to duplicate, valuable, and over which a firm has control. Resources can be raw materials, such as a gold mine or oil well, or intellectual, such as patents, and even trademarks and brands (such as the valuation of the Coca-Cola brand).

== Published works ==
- The Economics of the International Patent System, Baltimore, Johns Hopkins Press, 1951, ISBN 0-8371-6653-5
- The Theory of the Growth of the Firm, New York, John Wiley and Sons, 1959, ISBN 978-0-19-828977-7
- The Growth of the Firm - A Case Study: The Hercules Powder Company, Business History Review, Volume 34 Spring Issue, S. 1-23, 1960
- The Large International Firm in Developing Countries: The International Petroleum Industry, London, Allen & Unwin, 1968, ISBN 0-8371-8850-4
- New Orientations: Essays in International Relations, with Peter Lyon, Frank Cass & Co, 1970, ISBN 0-7146-2593-0
- Iraq: International Relations and National Development, with Ernest Penrose, Boulder, Westview Press, 1978, ISBN 0-89158-804-3

== Bibliography ==
- Penrose, Angela (2018). No Ordinary Woman: The Life of Edith Penrose. Oxford: Oxford University Press. ISBN 978-0198753940.
