= Davis Rich Dewey =

American economist and statistician

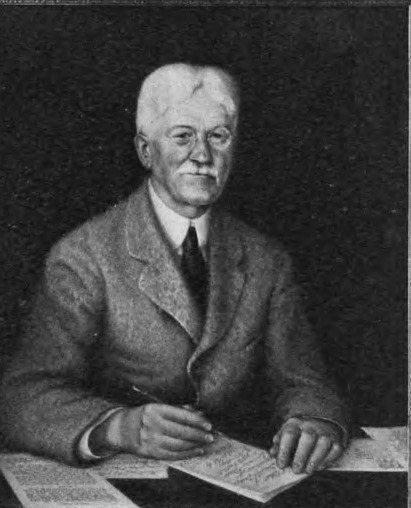
- Born: April 7, 1858
- Died: December 13, 1942
- Occupation: Economist

Davis Rich Dewey (April 7, 1858 – December 13, 1942) was an American economist and statistician.

He was born at Burlington, Vermont. Like his well-known younger brother, John Dewey, he was educated at the University of Vermont and Johns Hopkins University. He later became professor of economics and statistics at the Massachusetts Institute of Technology. He was chairman of the Massachusetts state board on the question of the unemployed (1895), member of the Massachusetts commission on public, charitable, and reformatory interests (1897), special expert agent on wages for the 12th census, and member of a state commission (1904) on industrial relations.

Dewey became managing editor of the American Economic Review in 1911. He wrote and published:

- Syllabus on Political History since 1815 (1887)
- Financial History of the United States. Longmans, Green. 1918 [1902]. OCLC 218289.
- Employees and Wages: Special Report on the Twelfth Census (1903)
- National Problems (1907)

The library of the MIT Sloan School of Management, MIT Department of Economics, and MIT Department of Political Science was named after Dewey.{}
