= Simon Patten =

American post-scarcity economist (1852–1922)

Simon N. Patten
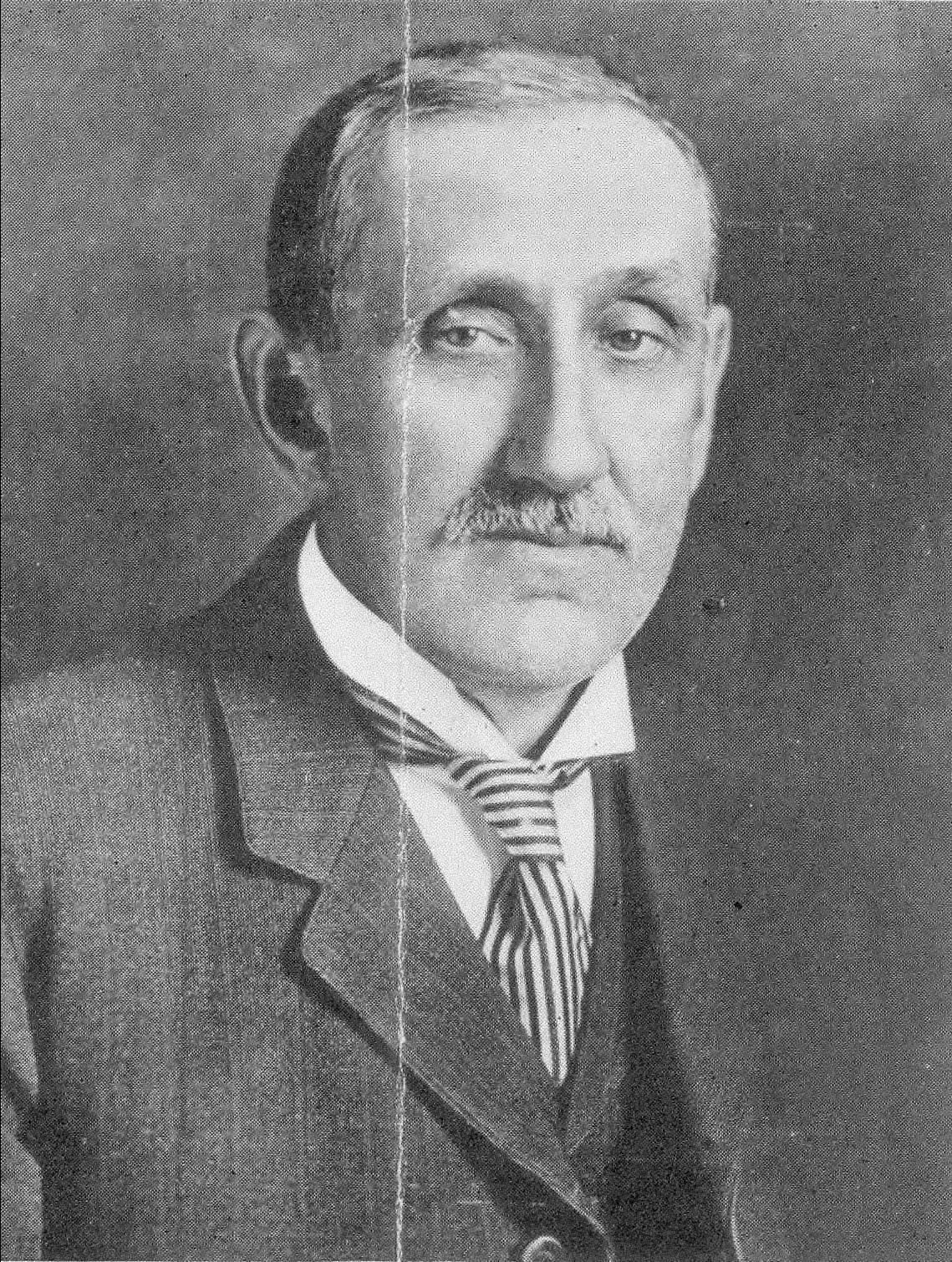
- Born: May 1, 1852; Sandwich, Illinois, US
- Died: July 24, 1922 (aged 70); Browns Mills, New Jersey, US

Academic background
- Education: University of Halle
- Doctoral advisor: Johannes Conrad

Academic work
- Institutions: University of Pennsylvania
- Doctoral students: Henry Rogers Seager, Scott Nearing

Simon Nelson Patten (May 1, 1852 – July 24, 1922) was an American economist and the chair of the Wharton School of Business at the University of Pennsylvania. Patten was one of the first economists to posit a shift from an 'economics of scarcity' to an 'economics of abundance'; that is, he believed that soon there would be enough wealth to satisfy people's basic needs and that the economy would shift from an emphasis on production to consumption.

== Life and work ==
Patten was born in Sandwich, Illinois.

Patten attended the University of Halle (1876–1879), where he came under the influence of Johannes Conrad, a member of the German Historical school, a group of economists who believed that scholars should use their expertise to help solve modern social problems. His German experience reinforced his belief in social reform and planned change, but within an American context—that is, change and reform through voluntary action with minimal governmental control.

After several years of apprenticeship teaching in primary and secondary schools, Patten in 1887 was appointed professor of economics at the Wharton School of the University of Pennsylvania. He held this important post until 1917, when his vigorous antiwar views got him into trouble and he was forced into premature retirement.

Over the years he published 22 books and several hundred articles, both scholarly and popular. The New Basis of Civilization (1907), an outgrowth of lectures he delivered in 1905 at the New York School of Social Work, was his most important work. It ran through eight editions between 1907 and 1923.

He wrote of the state of economics in 1913, "It is a weakness of economics that the social ideas upon which its theories rest have been neglected. Economic theories have been put forward as though they depended solely upon physical or objective conditions."

Patten believed that with the new technology the Earth's resources were adequate to provide an economy of abundance for the Western world; that is, there was enough wealth available so that everyone could achieve a proper diet, good basic housing and clothing, and an education that would meet the job requirements of industry. What was lacking was group social action to achieve these desired goals. Nevertheless, he was very influential on Progressive Era politicians and policy.

His thought can be juxtaposed with that of his contemporary, Thorstein Veblen.

== Books ==
- Das Finanzwesen der Staaten und Städte der Nordamerikanischen Union, 1878
- Premises of Political Economy, being a re-examination of certain fundamental principles of economic science, 1885.
- The Consumption of Wealth, 1889
- The Stability of Prices, 1889
- Principles of Rational Taxation, 1890
- The Economic Basis of Protection, 1890
- The Educational Value of Political Economy, 1890
- The Theory of Dynamic Economics, 1892
- The Theory of Social Forces, 1896.
- The Development of English Thought: A Study in the economic interpretation of history. New York and London: The Macmillan Company; Macmillan & Co. Ltd. 1899.
- The Theory of Prosperity, 1902.
- Heredity and Social Progress, 1903.
- New Basis of Civilization, 1907.
- "Theories of Progress", 1911, AER
- The Social Basis of Religion, Preface and scroll down to chapter-preview links, 1911.
- Reconstruction of Economic Theory, 1912
- "Mandeville in the Twentieth Century", 1918, AER
