= Johannes Conrad =

German economist (1839–1915)

Johannes Ernst Conrad
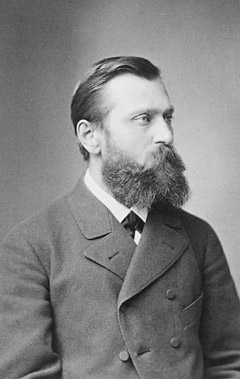
- Johannes Ernst Conrad (1839-1915)
- Born: 28 February 1839; Borkau, West Prussia
- Died: 25 April 1915 (aged 76); Halle (Saale), Germany
- Education: University of Jena; University of Berlin
- Known for: Political economics
- Scientific career
- Fields: Economist
- Workplaces: University of Halle; University of Jena
- Doctoral advisor: Bruno Hildebrand
- Doctoral students: Ernest L. Bogart; Jeremiah Jenks; Frank Fetter; Edmund J. James; Hermann Paasche; Arthur Ruppin
- Other notable students: Henry C. Taylor; Richard T. Ely; Wesley Clair Mitchell; Simon N. Patten; Joseph F. Johnson

Johannes Ernst Conrad (born 28 February 1839 in West Prussia) was a German political economist. Johannes Conrad was a Professor of economics in Halle (Saale), Prussian Germany. He was a co-founder (with Gustav von Schmoller) of the important Verein für Socialpolitik in 1872. Late in his career, in 1911, he became the director of the newly established Institute for Co-operative Studies at the University of Halle. Conrad was an expert in political economy (Nationalökonomie) and became the editor of the influential Jahrbücher für Nationalökonomie und Statistik in 1870.

== Life ==
Conrad's father was landowner in west Prussia. In the early days, Conrad dedicated himself to agriculture, studied on that, by physical suffering to giving the practical activity up in a forced manner, to natural sciences, finally in Berlin and Jena political sciences. After completion of his studies he made larger journeys in Italy, England, France, Poland, Hungary, he achieved habilitation, in 1868 he became private lecturer in Jena, 1870 he was appointed extraordinary professor and in the same year he was appointed full professor.

From 1851 to 1857 he attended grammar school in Gdansk, but due to serious illness and he prematurely had to leave school. Beginning 1861, he was with the University of Berlin in order to study natural sciences. In 1862, Conrad moved on to the University of Jena, where he completed his 1864 doctoral thesis and his 1868 habilitation thesis entitled, Die Statistik der landwirtschaftlichen Produktion. Kritik ihrer bisherigen Leistungen, sowie Vorschläge zu ihrer Förderung. (The statistics of agricultural production . Criticism of their performance, as well as proposals for their promotion). A highly successful and fast career followed. He obtained his habilitation in 1868 in Jena, and in 1870, Conrad became adjunct professor at Jena. Two years later he was appointed professor at the University of Halle, as successor to the famous Gustav Schmoller. He refused an offer to work at the University of Göttingen, remaining at the University of Halle until the end of life.

During 1885-86, he was rector (vice-chancellor) at Halle and dealt primarily with issues of agricultural statistics and policy. He founded the State Academic (Staatswissenschaftliche) Seminar, at which a large number of students trained, including many students from Japan.

His books were very common, especially the principles and guidelines of the national economy and economy policy and a plan of economic and financial statistics. Even practical-political issues investigated, he said the importance of cereal import duties for the then very vulnerable German agriculture. Conrad was a member of the Commission on the advice of the second draft of the Civil Code.

The Americans, Richard T. Ely, Simon N. Patten, Edmund J. James, and Joseph F. Johnson studied under Conrad at Halle in the late 1870s, thus profoundly influencing the Harvard University Department of Economics.

Conrad was elected a member of the American Antiquarian Society in 1893.

== Books by Conrad ==
- Liebig's Ansicht von der Bodenerschöpfung und ihre geschichtliche, statistische und nationalökonomische Begründung. Jena 1864 (Doctoral thesis).
- Die Statistik der landwirtschaftlichen Produktion. Kritik ihrer bisherigen Leistungen, sowie Vorschläge zu ihrer Förderung. Jena 1868 (Habilitation thesis).
- Das Universitätsstudium in Deutschland. Jena 1884
- Findelanstalten
- Rodbertus' Rentenprinzip
- Agrarstatistische Untersuchungen und andere Abhandlungen in den Jahrbüchern für Nationalökonomie und Statistik
- Ferner gab er seit 1877 die Sammlung von Arbeiten des staatswissenschaftlichen Seminars zu Halle heraus, welches unter seiner Leitung stand.

== See also ==
- Frank Fetter
- Hermann Paasche
- Arthur Ruppin
