= Matthew B. Hammond =

American economist (1868–1933)

Matthew Brown Hammond (July 13, 1868, South Bend, Indiana – September 28, 1933, Columbus, Ohio) was an American economist. He was a professor of economics and sociology at Ohio State University from 1904 until his death in 1933.

Hammond earned a bachelor's degree from the University of Michigan in 1891, a M.L. degree from University of Wisconsin in 1893, and PhD in economics from Columbia University in 1898. He also spent time at the University of Tübingen and University of Berlin over the period 1893–1894.

He was on the faculty at the University of Missouri and University of Illinois before joining Ohio State University as assistant professor in 1904. He was promoted to associate professor and then to full professor in 1908.

== Bibliography ==
- Matthew Brown Hammond (1897). The Cotton Industry: An Essay in American Economic History. American Economic Association.
- Matthew Brown Hammond (1919). British Labor Conditions and Legislation During the War. Oxford University Press. ISBN 9780665789243.
