= John Chipman (economist) =

Canadian-born American economist (1926–2022)

- Born: June 28, 1926; Montreal, Canada
- Died: February 24, 2022 (aged 95)
- Years active: 1951–2022

Academic background
- Education: McGill University; Johns Hopkins University
- Thesis: The Theory of Intersectional Money Flows and Income Formation (1951)
- Doctoral advisor: Fritz Machlup

Academic work
- Discipline: Econometrics; International trade Welfare economics History of economic thought
- Doctoral students: Masahiko Aoki, James Melvin, James Moore, Raymond Riezman, Joaquin Silvestre, Oz Shy

John Somerset Chipman (June 28, 1926 – February 24, 2022) was a Canadian-born American economist who was a noted expert on the econometrics of international trade. He was Regents' Professor of Economics at the University of Minnesota, where he later held emeritus status. He was elected to the American Academy of Arts and Sciences in 1979 and to the National Academy of Sciences in 1993.

== Early life and education ==
John Somerset Chipman was born on June 28, 1926, in Montreal, Canada. He received his B.A. degree from McGill University in 1947 and an M.A. in Economics and Political Science from the same university in 1948. Chipman earned his Ph.D. from Johns Hopkins University in 1951 with a dissertation entitled, "The Theory of Intersectional Money Flows and Income Formation."

== Career ==
Chipman served as assistant professor of economics at Harvard University from 1951 to 1955 before moving to the University of Minnesota in 1955, where he taught until his retirement in 2007. Among his Ph.D. students was Masahiko Aoki. In 1981, he was named Regents' Professor of Economics.

== Research ==
Chipman's research focused on international trade, econometrics, and welfare economics. He was also an expert on the history of economic thought, and was involved in translating classic economic texts into English, including Italian economist Vilfredo Pareto's 1906 work Manual of Political Economy, which established the economic principle of "Pareto optimality."

== Death ==
Chipman died in 2022, and he was survived by his wife, Margaret. His death was announced on February 14, 2023.
