= William Fellner =

American economist (1905–1983)

William John Fellner (born Fellner Vilmos on May 31, 1905 – September 15, 1983) was a Hungarian-American economist and Sterling Professor of Economics at Yale University from 1952 until his retirement in 1973. Born in Budapest, Austria-Hungary, he studied at the University of Budapest, the ETH Zurich and the Frederick William University in Berlin, where he received his Ph.D. in economics in 1929. Fellner served on the Council of Economic Advisers from 1973 to 1975.
