= Charles Franklin Dunbar =

American economist (1830–1900)

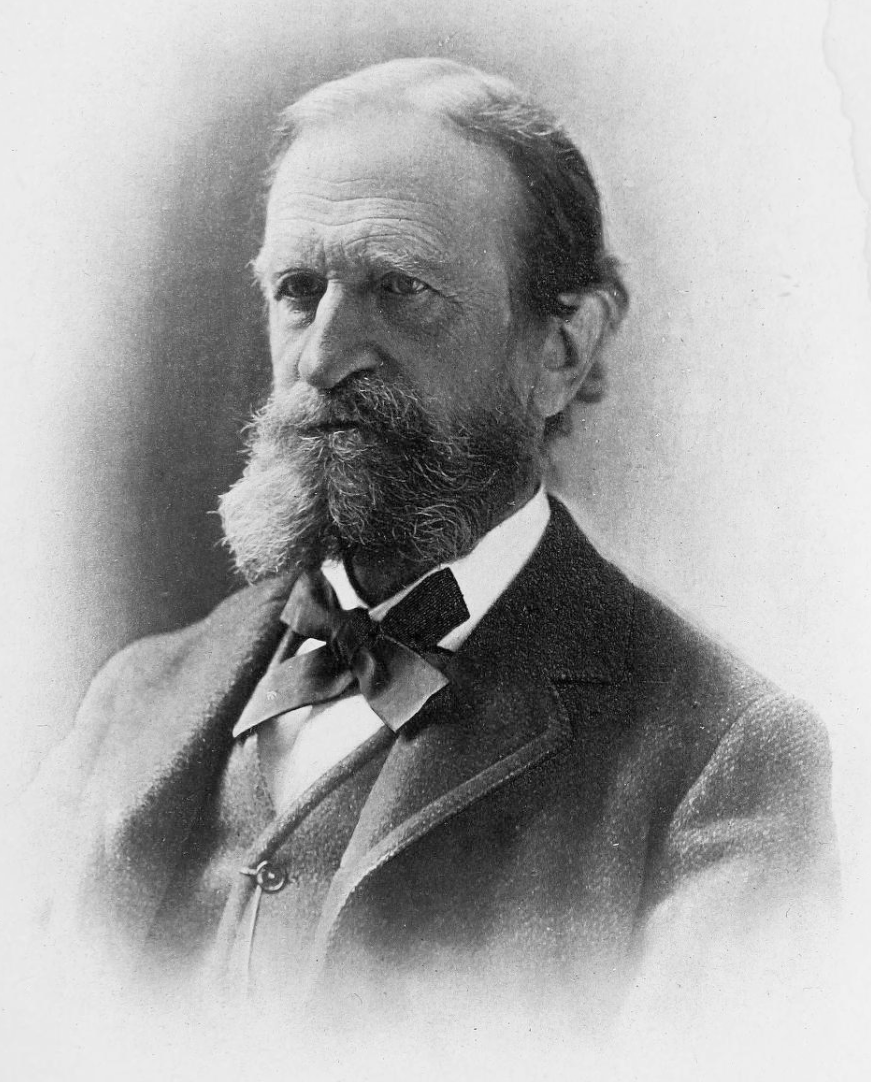
- Born: July 28, 1830; Abington, Massachusetts
- Died: January 29, 1900 (aged 69); Cambridge, Massachusetts
- Education: Harvard University
- Occupation: Economist
- Spouse: Julia Ruggles Copeland (m. 1853; died 1899)

Charles Franklin Dunbar (July 28, 1830– January 29, 1900) was an American economist. He held the first Chair of Political Economy at the Harvard University in 1871.

== Biography ==
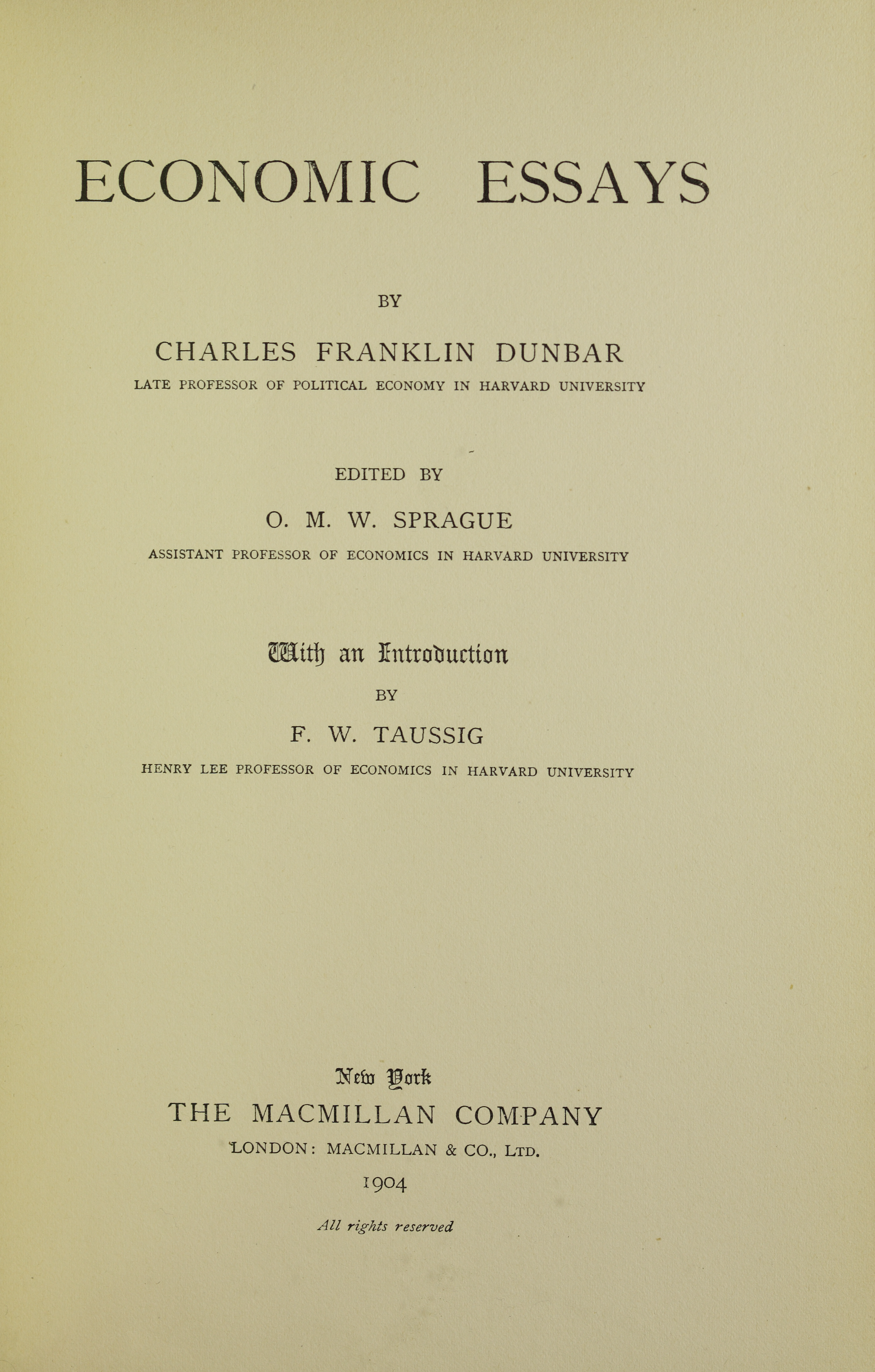
Economic Essays, title page (1904)

Charles Franklin Dunbar was born in Abington, Massachusetts on July 28, 1830. He graduated from Harvard University in 1851. From 1885 to 1898 he served as a trustee and later as president of the Board of Trustees of Phillips Exeter Academy.

Upon the founding of the Quarterly Journal of Economics in 1886, he was appointed editor.

He married Julia Ruggles Copeland on November 30, 1853. She died on November 29, 1899.

Charles Franklin Dunbar died at his home in Cambridge on January 29, 1900.

Dunbar Hall, a dormitory on the campus of Phillips Exeter, was named after him in 1901, as was its replacement after it was destroyed by fire in 1907.

== Works ==
- Economic Essays. New York: Macmillan. 1904.
- The Theory And History Of Banking (3 ed.). New York & London: G.P. Putnam's Sons. 1917 [1891].
- Laws of the United States Relating to Currency, Finance and Banking, from 1789 to 1891. 1891.
