= 1911 in literature =

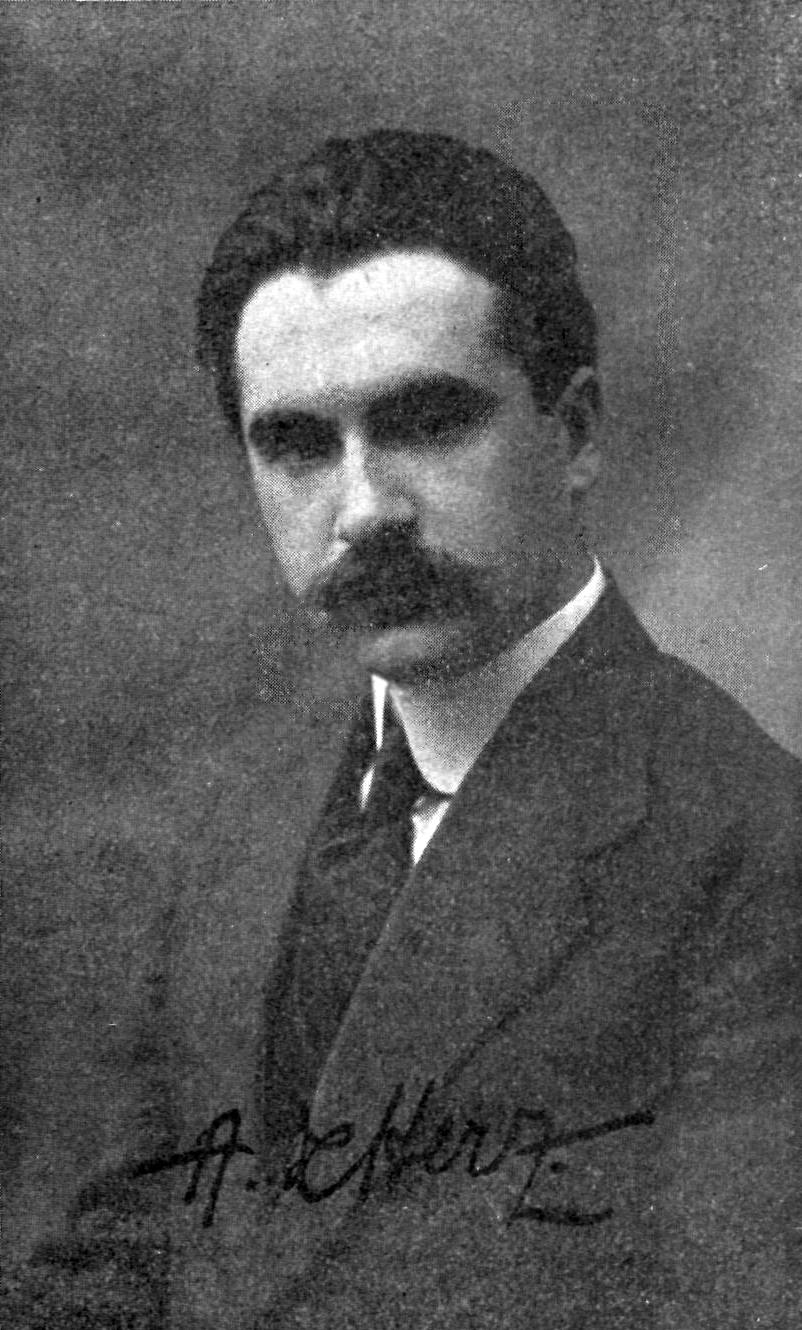
A de Herz (Dinu Ramură)

This article contains information about the literary events and publications of 1911.

== Events ==
- January – The journal Ay Qap begins monthly publication in Arabic script in Troitsk, to promote modern Kazakh literature and progressive thought.
- February–March – Antisemitic riots break out in Paris over the staging of Henri Bernstein's Après moi by the Comédie-Française. The riots were instigated by the far-right Action Française which was led by writer Charles Maurras, but in conjunction with the far-left Guerre Sociale.
- March
  - Filippo Tommaso Marinetti in Paris plans a Futurist conference and publishes a manifesto, Le futurisme, at Sansot.
  - Publication in The Strand Magazine (London) of the P. G. Wodehouse short story "Absent Treatment" introducing the character Reggie Pepper, a prototype for Bertie Wooster.
- March 29 – The 1911 New York State Capitol fire in Albany destroys 700,000 books and documents belonging to the New York State Library.
- April – Hugo Gernsback begins to publish his pioneering science fiction novel Ralph 124C 41+ in the monthly U.S. magazine Modern Electrics.
- c. April 8 – The English poet Lascelles Abercrombie and his family move to near Dymock in rural Gloucestershire, as the first of the Dymock poets.
- May 9 – The works of Gabriele D'Annunzio are placed on the Index of Forbidden Books by the Vatican.
- May 31 – The French publishers Éditions Gallimard is founded in Paris by Gaston Gallimard as Les Éditions de la Nouvelle Revue Française (nrf). Its first publication is Paul Claudel's play L'Otage.
- Summer – Jaroslav Hašek begins publishing stories of The Good Soldier Švejk (Dobrý voják Švejk) in the Prague newspaper Karikatura, edited by the illustrator Josef Lada.
- September 7 – Wilhelm Apollinaris de Kostrowitzky, writing as "Guillaume Apollinaire", is suspected in the theft of the Mona Lisa from the Louvre museum in Paris on August 21 and imprisoned for six days. This year he publishes his first book of poetry, Le Bestiaire ou Cortège d'Orphée.
- October 16 – The new building for the Mitchell Library opens in Glasgow.
- October 17 – Rudolf Wilhelm Friedrich Ditzen, the later German novelist Hans Fallada, kills his best friend in a suicide pact staged as a duel.
- November
  - The Kalem Company of New York agrees to pay the estate of author Lew Wallace $25,000 for having adapted Ben Hur (1907 film) from his novel without securing prior rights.
  - Virginia Stephen begins to share her brother Adrian Stephen's London house at 38 Brunswick Square with other members of the Bloomsbury Group: Leonard Woolf (her future husband), John Maynard Keynes and Duncan Grant.
- December 16 – The U.K. Copyright Act consolidates copyright law in the British Empire and confirms the six libraries to which a copy of every book published in the U.K. must be deposited by the publisher: the British Museum Library (London); the Bodleian Library (Oxford); the Advocates Library (Edinburgh); the National Library of Wales (Aberystwyth); Trinity College Dublin; and Cambridge University Library.

== New books ==
=== Fiction ===
- Pío Baroja
  - Las inquietudes de Shanti Andía
  - The Tree of Knowledge (El árbol de la ciencia)
- Lima Barreto – Triste Fim de Policarpo Quaresma (The Sad End of Policarpo Quaresma)
- Max Beerbohm – Zuleika Dobson
- Hilaire Belloc – The Four Men: a Farrago
- Arnold Bennett – The Card
- J. D. Beresford – The Hampdenshire Wonder
- Ambrose Bierce – The Devil's Dictionary
- Algernon Blackwood – The Centaur
- J. E. Casely-Hayford – Ethiopia Unbound
- Katharine Hopkins Chapman - The Fusing Force
- G. K. Chesterton – The Innocence of Father Brown
- Hugh Clifford – The Downfall of the Gods
- Joseph Conrad – Under Western Eyes
- Marie Corelli – Life Everlasting
- Warwick Deeping - Fox Farm
- Penelope Delta – Paramythi Horis Onoma (A Tale Without a Name)
- Theodore Dreiser – Jennie Gerhardt
- W. E. B. Du Bois – The Quest of the Silver Fleece
- Edna Ferber – Dawn O'Hara
- Ford Madox Ford – Ladies Whose Bright Eyes
- E. M. Forster – The Celestial Omnibus
- R. Austin Freeman – The Eye of Osiris
- Charlotte Perkins Gilman – Moving the Mountain
- Anna Katharine Green – Initials Only
- Ian Hay – A Safety Match
- Robert Hichens – The Fruitful Vine
- Violet Jacob – Flemington
- Pauline Johnson – Legends of Vancouver
- Mary Johnston – The Long Roll
- Eduard von Keyserling – Wellen
- Valery Larbaud – Fermina Márquez
- D. H. Lawrence – The White Peacock
- Stephen Leacock – Nonsense Novels
- Gaston Leroux
  - Balaoo
  - The Phantom of the Opera (Le Fantôme de l'Opéra, book publication)
- William John Locke — The Glory of Clementina Wing
- Katherine Mansfield – In a German Pension (short stories)
- John Masefield
  - Jim Davis; or, The Captive of Smugglers
  - The Street of Today
- A. E. W. Mason – Miranda of the Balcony
- E. Phillips Oppenheim – The Temptation of Tavernake
- Mori Ōgai (森 鷗外) – The Wild Geese (雁, Gan, serialization begins)
- Baroness Orczy – A True Woman
- Forrest Reid – The Bracknels
- Ameen Rihani – The Book of Khalid
- Saki – The Chronicles of Clovis
- Una Lucy Silberrad
  - The Affairs of John Bolsover
  - Sampson Rideout, Quaker
- Preah Botumthera Som – Dik ram phka ram (The Dancing Water and the Dancing Flower)
- Bram Stoker – The Lair of the White Worm
- Gene Stratton-Porter – The Harvester
- Kathleen Thompson Norris – Mother
- Sigrid Undset – Jenny
- Hugh Walpole – Mr. Perrin and Mr. Traill
- Mary Augusta Ward – The Case of Richard Meynell
- H. G. Wells – The New Machiavelli
- Edith Wharton – Ethan Frome
- Owen Wister – Padre Ignacio
- Jerzy Żuławski – Stara Ziemia (The Old Earth), last of the Trylogia Księżycowa (Lunar Trilogy)

=== Children and young people ===
- Victor Appleton - Tom Swift in the Caves of Ice
- J. M. Barrie – Peter and Wendy (later editions Peter Pan and Wendy)
- L. Frank Baum
  - The Sea Fairies
  - The Daring Twins
  - Aunt Jane's Nieces and Uncle John (as Edith Van Dyne)
  - The Flying Girl (as Edith Van Dyne)
- Frances Hodgson Burnett – The Secret Garden
- L. M. Montgomery – The Story Girl
- Ferenc Móra – Mindenki Jánoskája (Johnny to Everyone)
- Lucy Fitch Perkins – Dutch Twins (first in the Twins series)
- Beatrix Potter – The Tale of Timmy Tiptoes
- Jean Webster – Just Patty

=== Drama ===
- Hugo Ball – Die Nase des Michelangelo. Tragikomödie in vier Auftritten
- Tristan Bernard – The Little Cafe (Le petit café)
- Hall Caine – The Quality of Mercy (Also known as The Unwritten Law; a new version of Jan the Icelander)
- George Diamandy – Dolorosa
- St. John Greer Ervine – Mixed Marriage
- A. de Herz
  - Biruința (Victory)
  - Când ochii plâng (When Eyes Shed Tears)
- Edward Knoblock – Kismet
- Gregorio Martínez Sierra
  - Canción de cuna (Cradle Song)
  - Primavera en otoño (Spring in Autumn)
- Charles McEvoy – All That Matters
- [Mrs] Clifford Mills – Where the Rainbow Ends
- Emma Orczy – The Duke's Wager
- Louis N. Parker – Disraeli
- Rainis – Indulis un Ārija (Indulis and Ārija)
- Arthur Schnitzler – Das weite Land (The Vast Domain, The Distant Land, or Undiscovered Country)
- George Bernard Shaw – Fanny's First Play
- Karl Vollmöller – The Miracle (Das Mirakel)
- Hugo von Hofmannsthal – Jedermann
- W. B. Yeats – The Countess Cathleen (adapted for performance)

=== Poetry ===
- Edwin James Brady – River Rovers
- Else Lasker-Schüler – Meine Wunder
- John Masefield – The Everlasting Mercy

=== Non-fiction ===
- Encyclopædia Britannica Eleventh Edition.
- Wassily Kandinsky – Über das Geistige in der Kunst (Concerning the Spiritual in Art; dated 1912)
- Walter John Kilner – The Human Atmosphere
- Jack London – The Cruise of the Snark
- Filippo Tommaso Marinetti – Le futurisme
- Robert Michels – Political Parties: A Sociological Study of the Oligarchical Tendencies of Modern Democracy (Zur Soziologie des Parteiwesens in der modernen Demokratie; Untersuchungen über die oligarchischen Tendenzen des Gruppenlebens)
- George Moore – Ave (part 1 of his three-volume autobiography, Hail and Farewell)
- John Muir – My First Summer in the Sierra
- R. Scott-Moncrieff (editor) – The Household Book of Lady Grisell Baillie, 1692–1733
- C. T. Onions – A Shakespeare Glossary
- Percy Simpson – Shakespearean Punctuation
- Rudolf Steiner – Mystics of the Renaissance (English translation)
- Evelyn Underhill – Mysticism: A Study of the Nature and Development of Man's Spiritual Consciousness
- A. E. Waite
  - The Pictorial Key to the Tarot
  - The Secret Tradition in Freemasonry

== Births ==
- January 9 – Eva Alexanderson, Swedish novelist and translator (died 1994)
- January 18 – José María Arguedas, Peruvian author (died 1969)
- January 22 – Mary Hayley Bell, English dramatist (died 2005)
- January 24
  - C. L. Moore, American science fiction author (died 1987)
  - L. Ron Hubbard, American science fiction writer, founder of Scientology (died 1986)
- February 4 – Geoffrey Willans, English novelist and comic writer (died 1958)
- February 8 – Elizabeth Bishop, American poet, Pulitzer Prize winner (died 1979)
- February 17 – Margaret St. Clair, American science fiction writer (died 1995)
- March 11 – Fitzroy Maclean, Scottish political writer and autobiographer (died 1996)
- March 15 – Ursula Vaughan Williams, British poet, novelist and biographer (died 2007)
- March 16 – Sybille Bedford, German-born English novelist and journalist (died 2006)
- March 26 – Tennessee Williams, American playwright (died 1983)
- April 8 – Emil Cioran, Romanian philosopher and essayist (died 1995)
- April 19
  - Frank Barlow, English historian, (died 2009))
  - Ursula Moray Williams, English children's writer (died 2006)
- May 15 – Max Frisch, Swiss author (died 1991)
- May 20 – Annie M. G. Schmidt, Dutch children's author (died 1995)
- May 28 – Fritz Hochwälder, Austrian playwright (died 1986)
- June 2 – Xiao Hong (Qiao Yin, 張廼瑩) Chinese author (died 1942)
- June 15 - Wilbert Awdry, British Anglican reverend and children's author (died 1997)
- June 6 – Verna Aardema (Verna Norberg), American children's author (died 2000)
- June 30 – Czesław Miłosz, Lithuanian-born Polish author, Nobel Prize in Literature winner (died 2004)
- July 17 – Yang Jiang, Chinese playwright, author, and translator (died 2016)
- July 21 – Marshall McLuhan, Canadian media theorist (died 1980)
- July 22 – George Ivașcu, Romanian journalist, literary critic, and communist militant (died 1988)
- July 27 – Rayner Heppenstall, English novelist and poet (died 1981)
- September 19 – William Golding, British novelist, playwright and poet, Nobel Prize in Literature winner (died 1993)
- October 13 – Millosh Gjergj Nikolla, Albanian poet and writer (died 1938)
- November 2 – Odysseas Elytis, Greek poet, Nobel Prize winner (died 1996)
- November 19 – Mary Elizabeth Counselman, American author and poet (died 1995)
- November 28 – Václav Renč, Czech poet, dramatist and translator (died 1973)
- December 4 – Robert Payne, English author, poet and biographer (died 1983)
- December 11 – Naguib Mahfouz, Egyptian novelist, Nobel Prize in literature winner (died 2006)
- December 25 – Noel Langley, South African-born American screenwriter (died 1980)

== Deaths ==
- January 23 – David Graham Phillips, American journalist and novelist (murdered, born 1867)
- February 25 – Friedrich Spielhagen, German novelist, literary theorist and translator (born 1829)
- March 7 – Antonio Fogazzaro, Italian novelist (born 1842)
- April 14 – George Cary Eggleston, American memoirist (born 1839)
- April 25 – Emilio Salgari, Italian adventure novelist (suicide, born 1862)
- April 30 – Stanisław Brzozowski, Polish philosopher, publicist and critic (tuberculosis, born 1878)
- May 1 – Hannah Whitall Smith, American Quaker author (born 1832)
- May 9 – Thomas Wentworth Higginson, American writer, abolitionist and advocate of women's suffrage (born 1823)
- May 29 – W. S. Gilbert, English librettist, dramatist and comic poet (born 1836)
- June 7 – Henry Abbey, American poet (born 1842)
- June 10 – Adolf Wilbrandt, German novelist and dramatist (born 1837)
- June 14 – Charlotte O'Conor Eccles, Irish-born London writer, translator and journalist (born 1863)
- July 21 – Philippe Monnier, Swiss writer in French (born 1864)
- September 4 – John Francon Williams, Welsh-born writer, historian, and cartographer (born 1854)
- September 5 – Katherine Thurston, Irish novelist (born 1875)
- September 9 – Francis March, American lexicographer and philologist (born 1825)
- September 23 – John Arthur Barry, English author and journalist (born 1850)
- October 6 – Martha D. Lincoln ("Bessie Beech"), American author and journalist (born 1838)
- October 8 – Hesba Stretton (Sarah Smith), English children's writer (born 1832)
- October 29 – Joseph Pulitzer, Hungarian-born American journalist and publisher (born 1847)
- November 9
  - Mary Fortune, Australian writer of detective fiction (born 1832)
  - Howard Pyle, American children's author (born 1853)
- December 1 – Richard Barham Middleton, English poet and fiction writer (born 1882)
- December 22 – Catharine H. T. Avery, American author, editor, and educator (born 1844)
- December 13 – Henrietta Stannard, English novelist (writing as John Strange Winter, born 1856)
- December 29 – Rosamund Marriott Watson, English poet (born 1860)

== Awards ==
- Newdigate Prize: Roger Heath, "Achilles"
- Nobel Prize for Literature: Maurice Maeterlinck, Belgian poet, playwright, and essayist
- Prix Goncourt: Alphonse de Châteaubriant, Monsieur des Lourdines
