= Keyserling =

Keyserling is the surname of several members of the noble House of Keyserlingk:

- Alexander Keyserling (1815–1891), Russian geologist, paleontologist, botanist and zoologist
- Eugen von Keyserling (1833–1889), German arachnologist
- Hermann Graf Keyserling (1880–1946), German philosopher
- Eduard von Keyserling (1855–1918), German writer
- H.H. Keyserling (1866–1944), Russian naval officer, mariner and whaler in the Far East
- Leon Keyserling (1908–1987), American economist
- Arnold Keyserling (1922–2005), German philosopher, son of Hermann
- Billy Keyserling (born 1948), American politician
- Harriet Keyserling (1922–2010), American politician

== See also ==
- Kayserling
