= Aizpute =

Town in South Kurzeme Municipality, Latvia

- Town
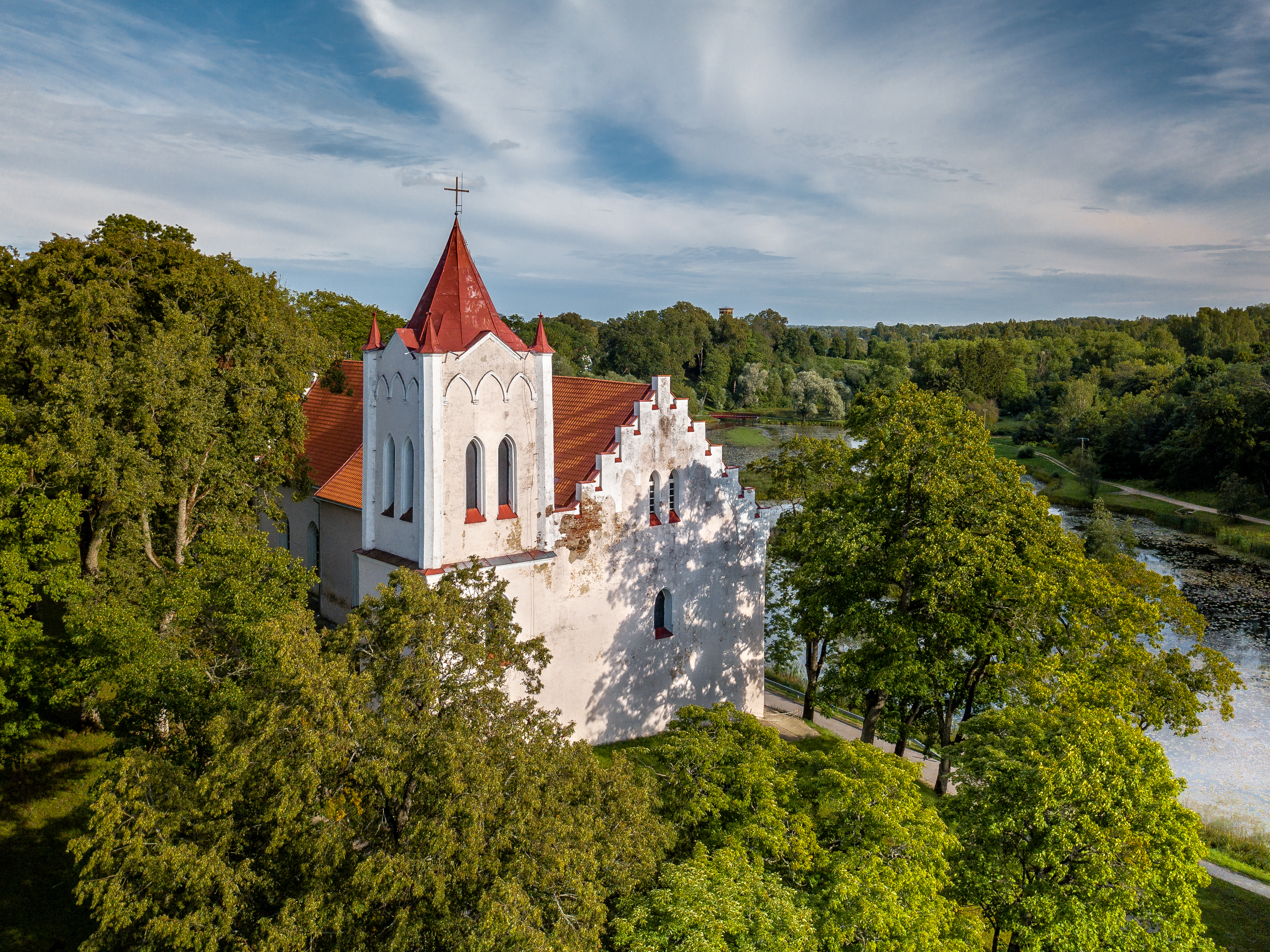
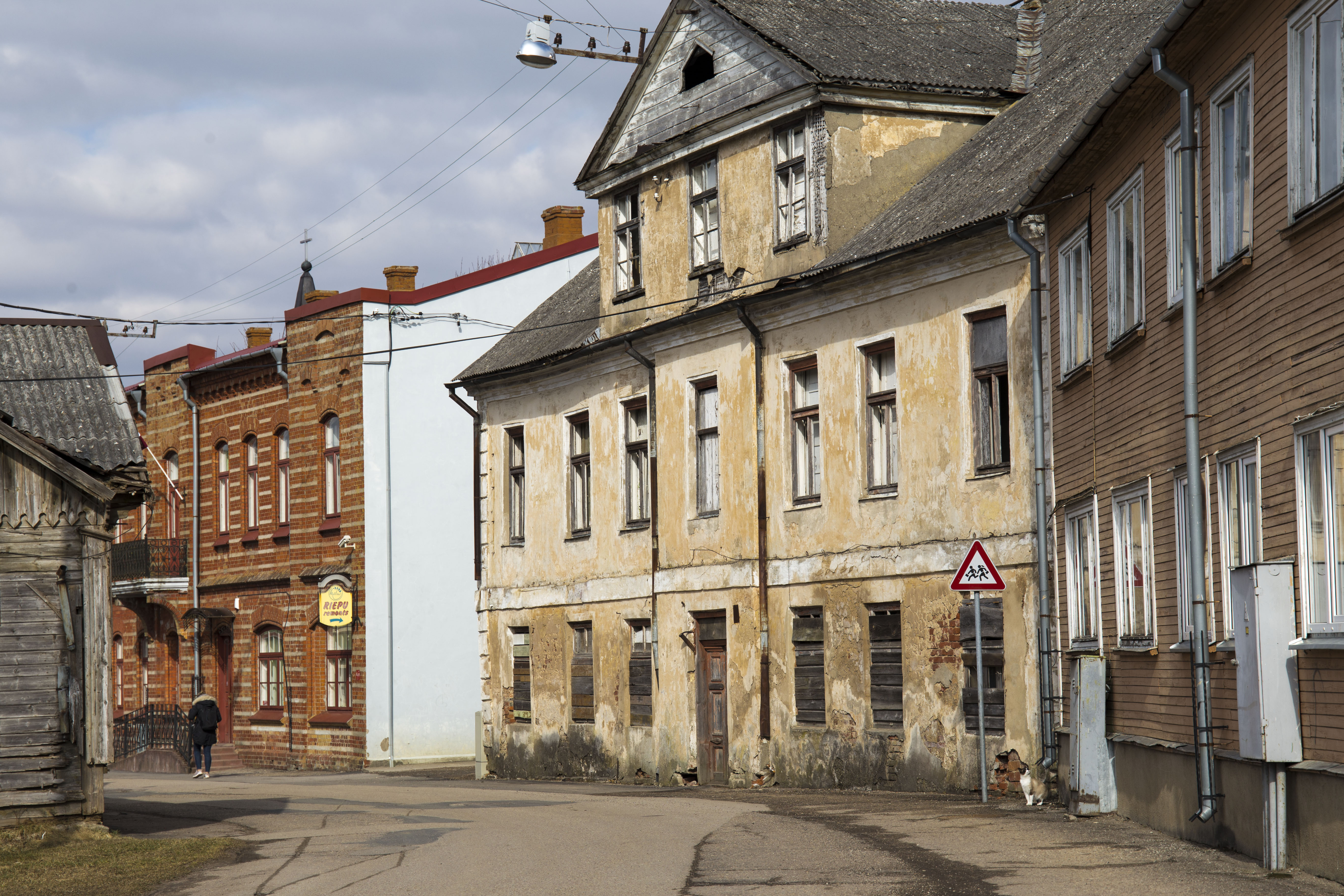
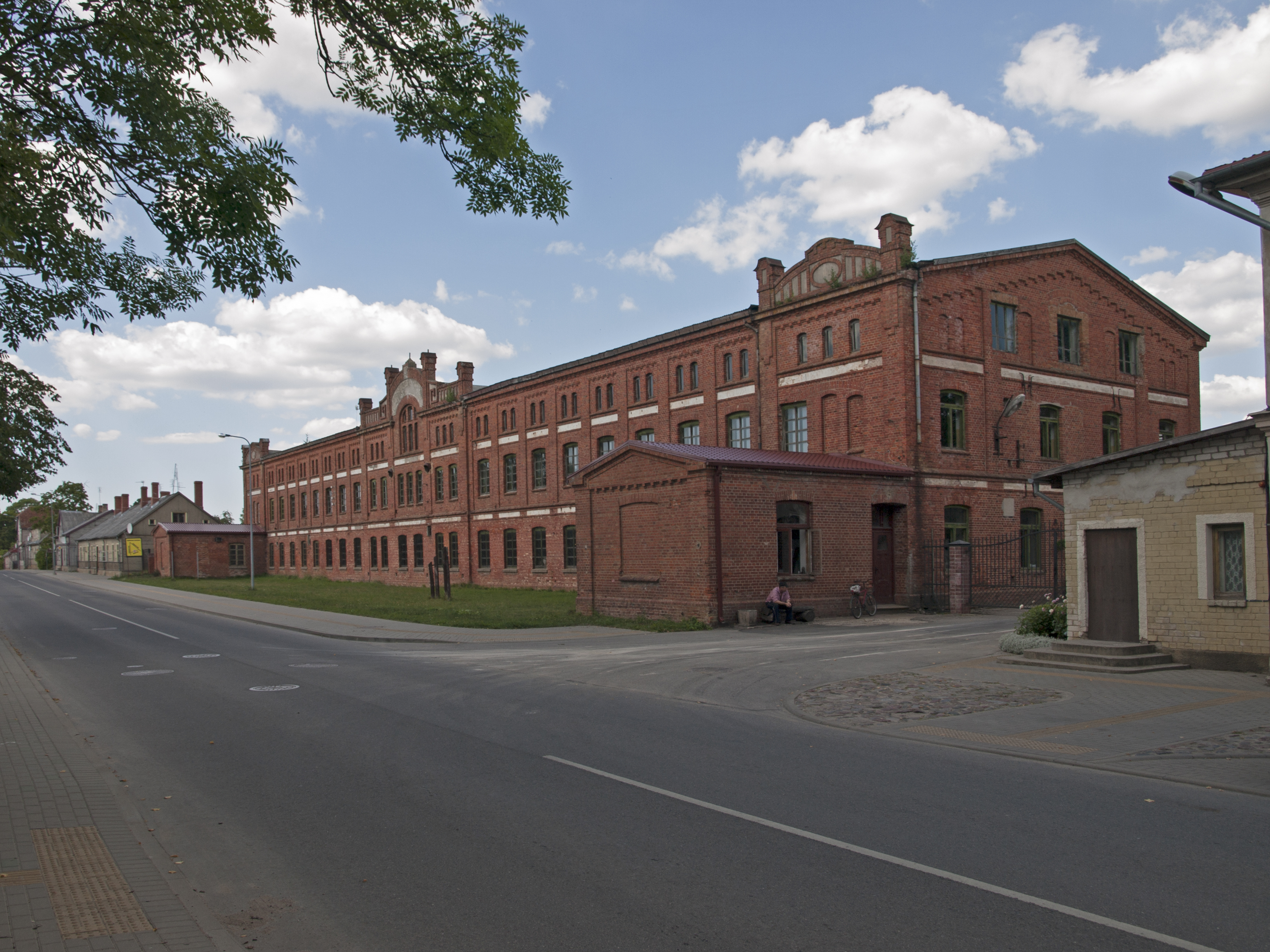
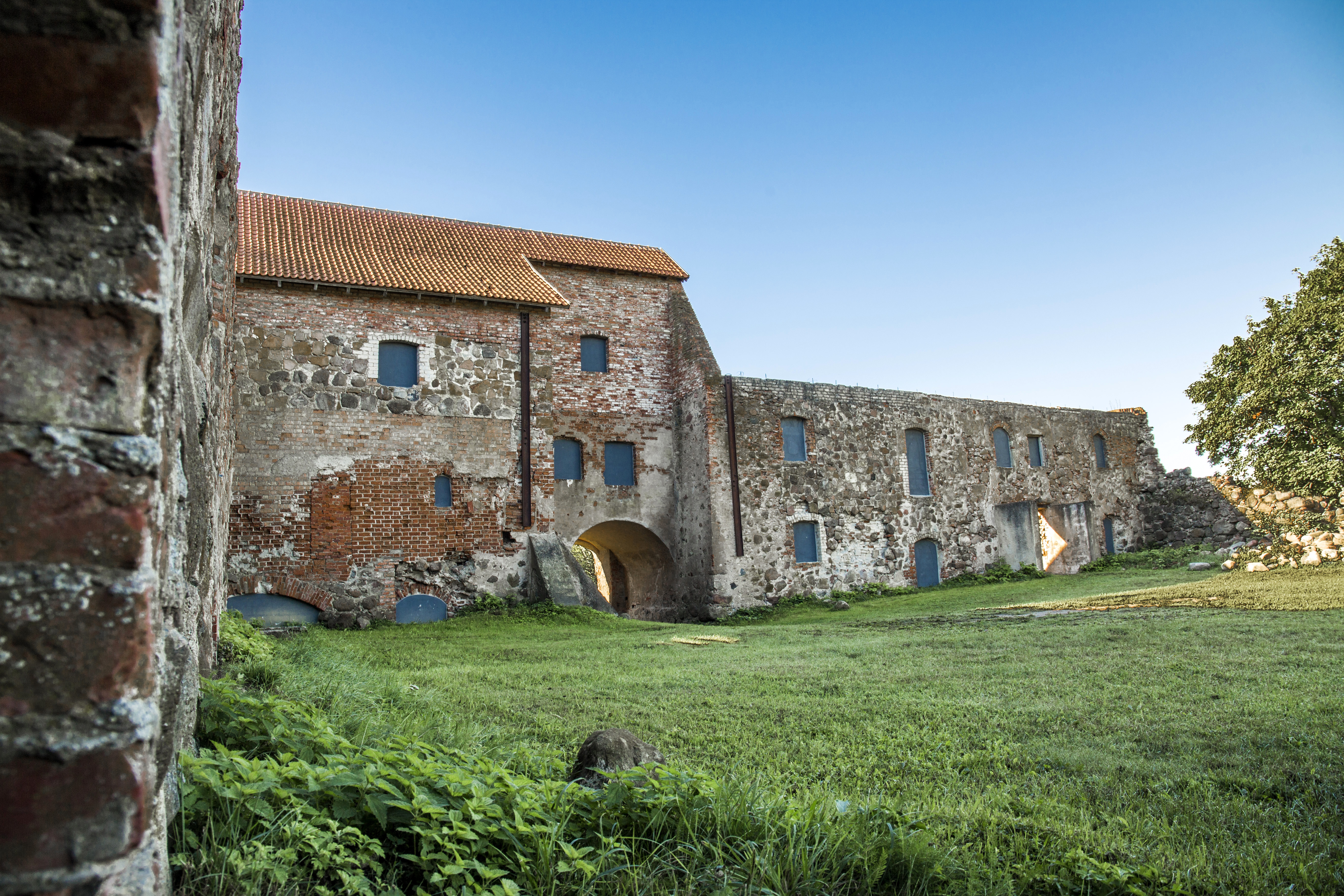
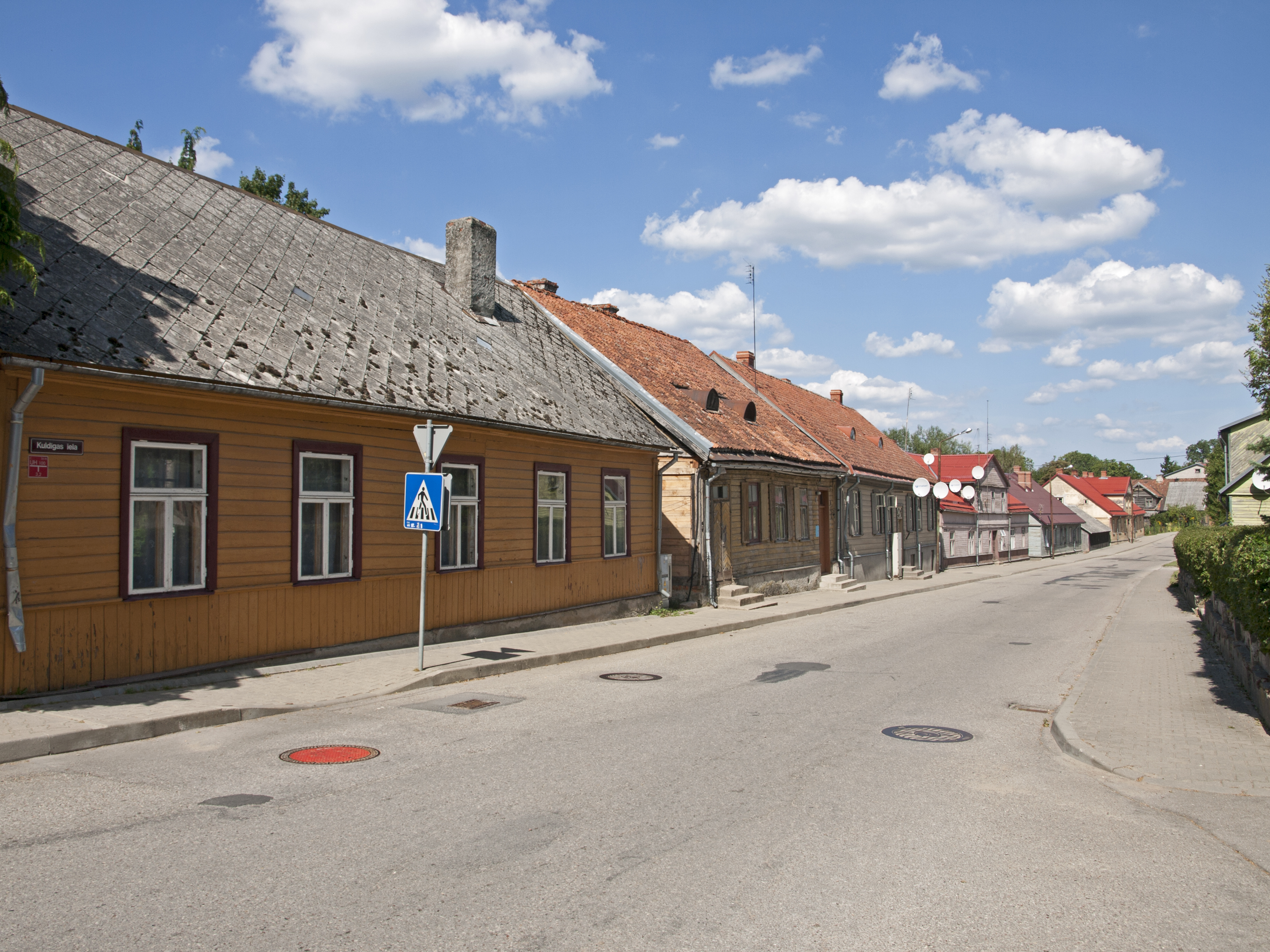
- Aizpute Lutheran Church Aizpute Town Center Lindenberg Paper Mill Aizpute Castle Kuldīga street

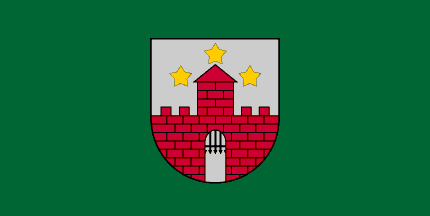
- Flag Coat of arms

- Location in Latvia
- Coordinates: 56°43′16″N 21°36′06″E
- Country: Latvia
- Municipality: South Kurzeme Municipality
- Town rights: 1378

Government
  - Mayor: Juris Grasmanis

Area
  - Total: 6.93 km^{2} (2.68 sq mi)
  - Land: 6.42 km^{2} (2.48 sq mi)
  - Water: 0.51 km^{2} (0.20 sq mi)

Population (2026)
  - Total: 3,763
  - Density: 586/km^{2} (1,520/sq mi)
- Time zone: UTC+2 (EET)
  - Summer (DST): UTC+3 (EEST)
- Postal code: LV-3456
- Calling code: +371 634
- Number of city council members: 11
- Website: www.aizpute.lv

Aizpute (German: Hasenpoth; historically Polish: Hazenpot) is a town in South Kurzeme Municipality in the Courland region of Latvia, in the valley of the Tebra River, situated 50 km (31 mi) northeast of Liepāja.

== Etymology ==
In a cartographic drawing of Bandava, Aizpute is marked with the name Asseboten, in 13th century writings Asimpute and Asenputte, which later became the German Hasenpoth. The roots of the ancient name of Aizpute seem to be found in the Finno-Ugric languages from the words Ase and Ason, which mean an 'actively inhabited place'. Famous linguist Jānis Endzelīns believed that the origin of the place name is most likely Baltic, possibly derived from the Lithuanian word pùsti ('pamt, tūkt'), meaning 'place behind the hill'.

== History ==
=== Early History ===
Various archaeological studies have shown that the area has been inhabited earlier than mentioned in written sources. During quarrying, an early Iron Age (2nd-4th century AD) settlement discovered during archaeological excavations in Misiņkalns was destroyed, as were nearby Curonian burial mounds (11th-13th century AD). There are at least 22 known burial mound sites in the Aizpute area. About 2 km south of Aizpute is Ormkalns, an ancient Couronian hillfort with a sacred spring at its foot, and to the south of it is a mound (Upurkalns), which is believed to have been an ancient Couronian place of worship.

In the 9th century, the Couronians built Beida Castle on the site of present-day Aizpute, from which the surrounding district was governed. It was located on the right bank of the Tebra River, near the Riga-Prussia trade and military road. The castle and its surroundings became a populated area during the heyday of the Couronian people, and it is believed that it was one of the most populated areas in the Bandava region. With the arrival of the Livonian Order in Aizpute, the old Latvian name of the castle, Beida, also disappeared.

=== Arrival of the Livonian Order (13th century) ===
In 1248, Dietrich von Grüningen Master of the Livonian Order, ordered the construction of Aizpute Castle on the left bank of the Tebra River, opposite Breida Castle, which is why 1248 is considered to be the founding year of the town of Aizpute. In 1253, after the division of Courland, Aizpute became part of the Bishopric of Courland. As early as 1254, a church was built on the site of Beida Castle. Part of the remains of the church walls from that time are now part of the stone church built in 1730, which was rebuilt in 1860. In 1258, the Couronians and the Lithuanians rebelled against the Livonian Order and in 1260, in the Battle of Durbe, they destroyed almost the entire army of the Order and killed the Master of the Order, von Hornhausen. The Curonians recaptured Aizpute, and the Bishop of Courland was only able to return there in 1295, when the Order had regained its strength.

=== The town of the Courland Cathedral Chapter (14th–16th century) ===
After the Order eventually consolidated its power in the early 14th century, a settlement soon sprang up around the newly built castle, as the Order not only enjoyed a favorable defensive position here, but also, thanks to the convenient transport links along the Tebra River to the Baltic Sea, it was seen as having potential for development as a center of trade. On March 17, 1378, Otto, Bishop of Courland, granted Aizpute Magdeburg rights, marking the town's boundaries with plots of land, fields, and meadows. Thanks to its extensive trade, it soon became a notable town. Around 1484, a Franciscan convent was established in Aizpute, where the so-called Poor Clares lived. In 1523, the convent suffered greatly from a fire of unknown origin, which can most likely be explained by the recent start of the Reformation and the general hostile attitude towards Franciscans.

In 1559, King Frederick II of Denmark bought the rights to Saaremaa from the last Bishop of Courland, Johann Minhauzen, and soon after, through the mediation of Domprovost Ulrich Bär, also bought the rest of the Courland Bishopric territory, including Aizpute, paying 30,000 thalers for all the properties. He left the purchased properties to his younger brother, Duke Magnus of Holstein.

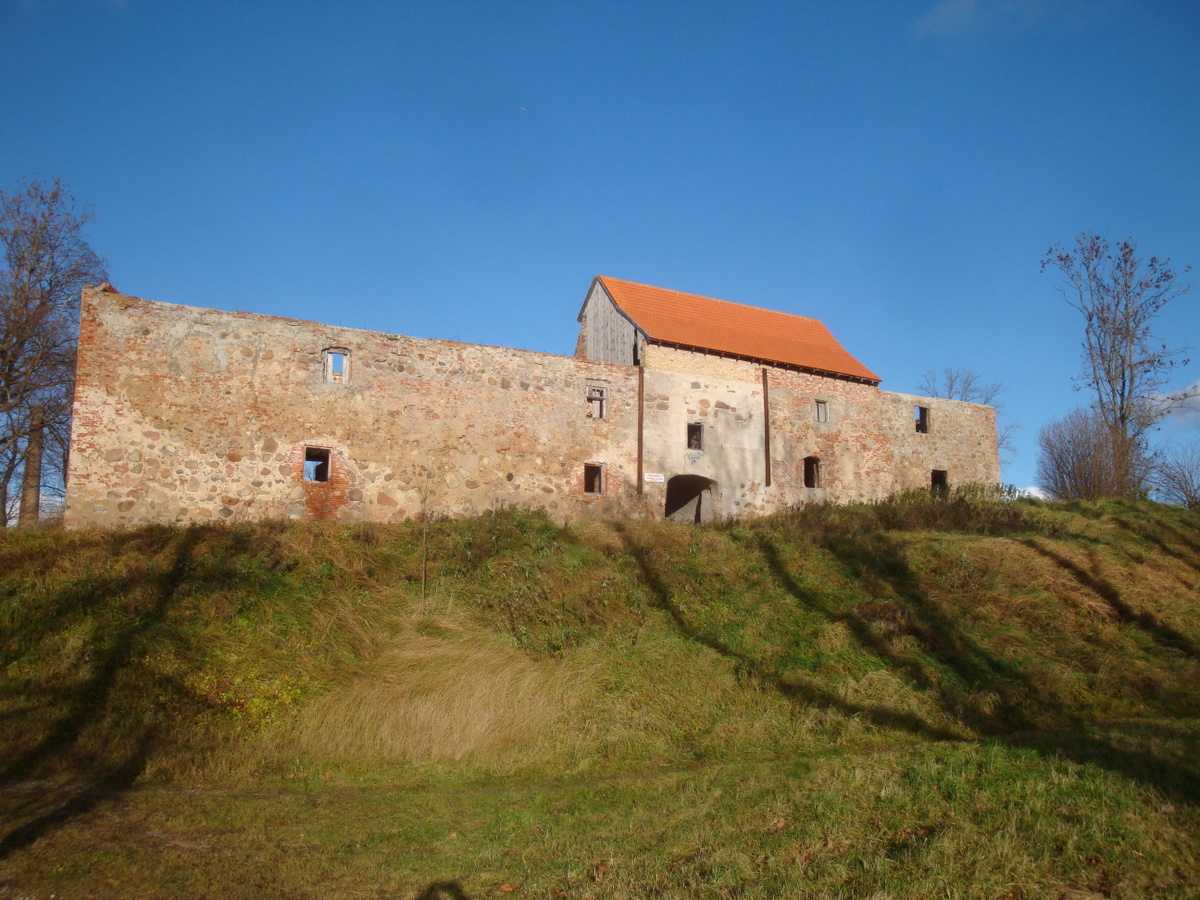
Ruins of Castle Hasenpoth now Aizpute Castle, built in 13th century.

=== Duchy of Courland, District of Pilten (16th–18th century) ===
Although he was crowned King of Livonia by Ivan IV of Russia, Magnus' reign was full of adversity. Living beyond his means and income, he squandered all his property and possessions, except for the town of Piltene, thus losing the tsar's favor. Magnus finally surrendered to Polish rule and, fleeing the tsar's wrath, settled in Piltene, where he died in poverty on March 18, 1583, leaving no heirs. The Polish king, who ruled over the Piltene region, had already promised Duke Gothard Ketler of Courland in an agreement dated February 28, 1561, to merge the Bishopric of Courland with the duchy, but this did not happen.

From the time when Aizpute, along with the rest of the Bishopric of Courland, was under the rule of the Margrave of Brandenburg, it often had to endure times of hardship and turmoil. The early 17th century brought crop failures, famine, and plague, which catastrophically reduced the population. The Polish-Swedish War severely disrupted Aizpute's foreign trade via Tebra and Saka to the Baltic Sea. In 1660, in accordance with the terms of the Treaty of Oliva, the Swedes blocked the Aizpute trading port at the mouth of the Saka River with stones. Both the subsequent Great Northern War and another plague epidemic created yet another obstacle to the town's development in the first half of the 18th century. After the Great Northern War, the mouth of the Saka River was cleared of stones and trade in Aizpute began to revive, but it never reached its former levels. During the period of 1611–1795, it was under the power of the Polish–Lithuanian Commonwealth as a capital of the semi-autonomous District of Pilten.

=== Russian Empire (18th–20th century) ===
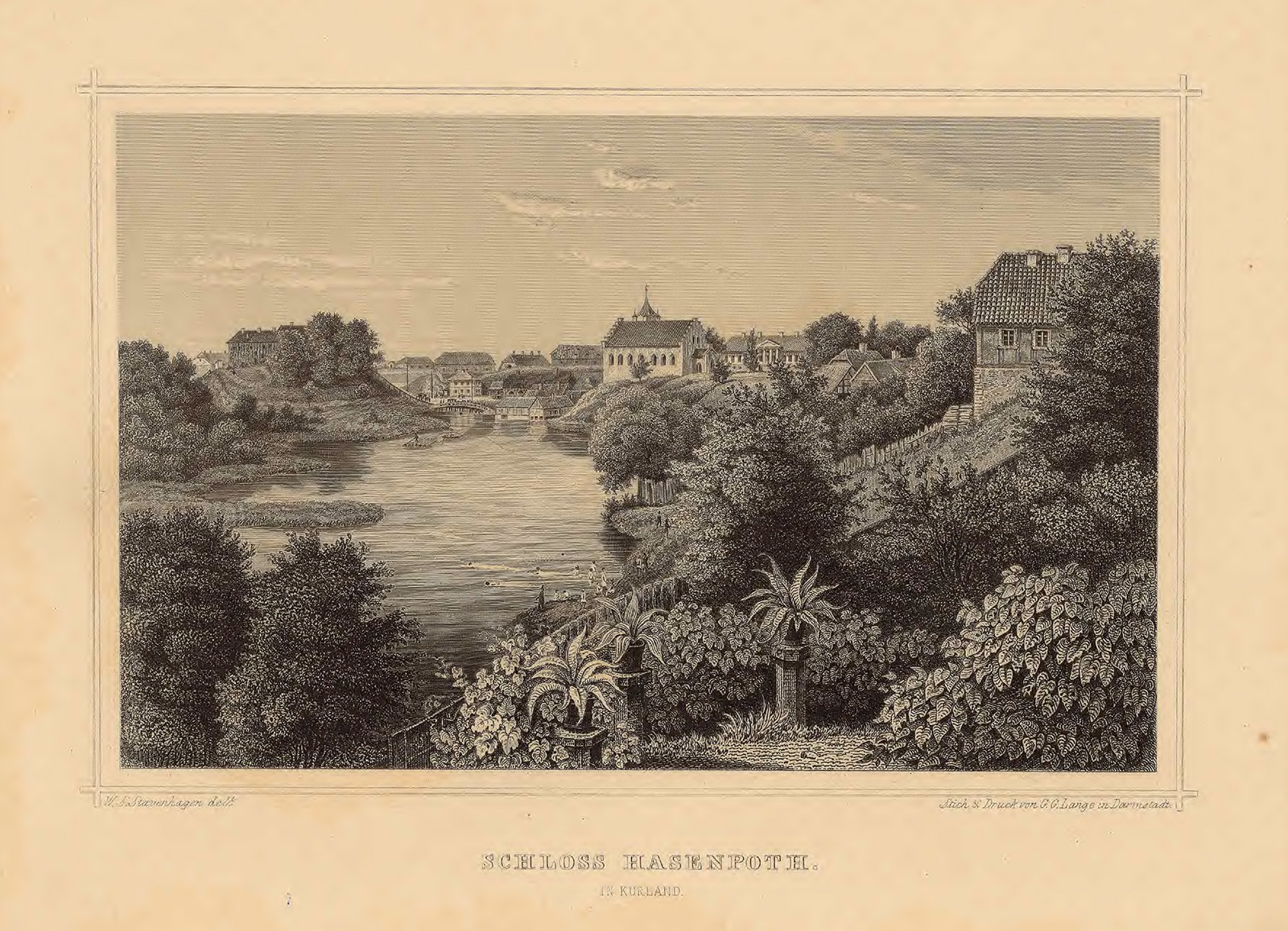
Aizpute around 1860.

After Courland was annexed by Russia in 1795, Aizpute became the administrative center of its district. After that, the population grew rapidly as Lithuanian Jews, who were allowed to settle in Aizpute, began to arrive. Around 1850, a candle factory was established in Aizpute. During the Russo-Turkish War of 1878, Turkish prisoners of war were also held in Aizpute. Between March 3 and April 21, 1878, a total of 229 prisoners were stationed there. In 1890, the Lindenberg cardboard factory (which produced labels and pharmacy boxes) began operating. In 1899, the Liepāja-Aizpute narrow-gauge railway line was opened. During the Russian Revolution of 1905, Aizpute was one of the places where local revolutionists showed armed resistance to the Cossack punitive units. It led to the so-called Aizpute War at Rokasbirzs. Before World War I, Aizpute had a brewery, a wool carding mill, a printing house, and a flour mill.

=== Latvian War of Independence, World War II (20th century) ===
During the Latvian War of Independence, on November 13 and 14, 1919, the 10th Aizpute Infantry Regiment took part in battles against Bermont's army near Liepāja. In the 1920s and 1930s, Aizpute was a typical small town of shopkeepers and craftsmen. The Aizpute-Kalvene road was built, and a park was established in Misiņkalns.

==== Holocaust ====
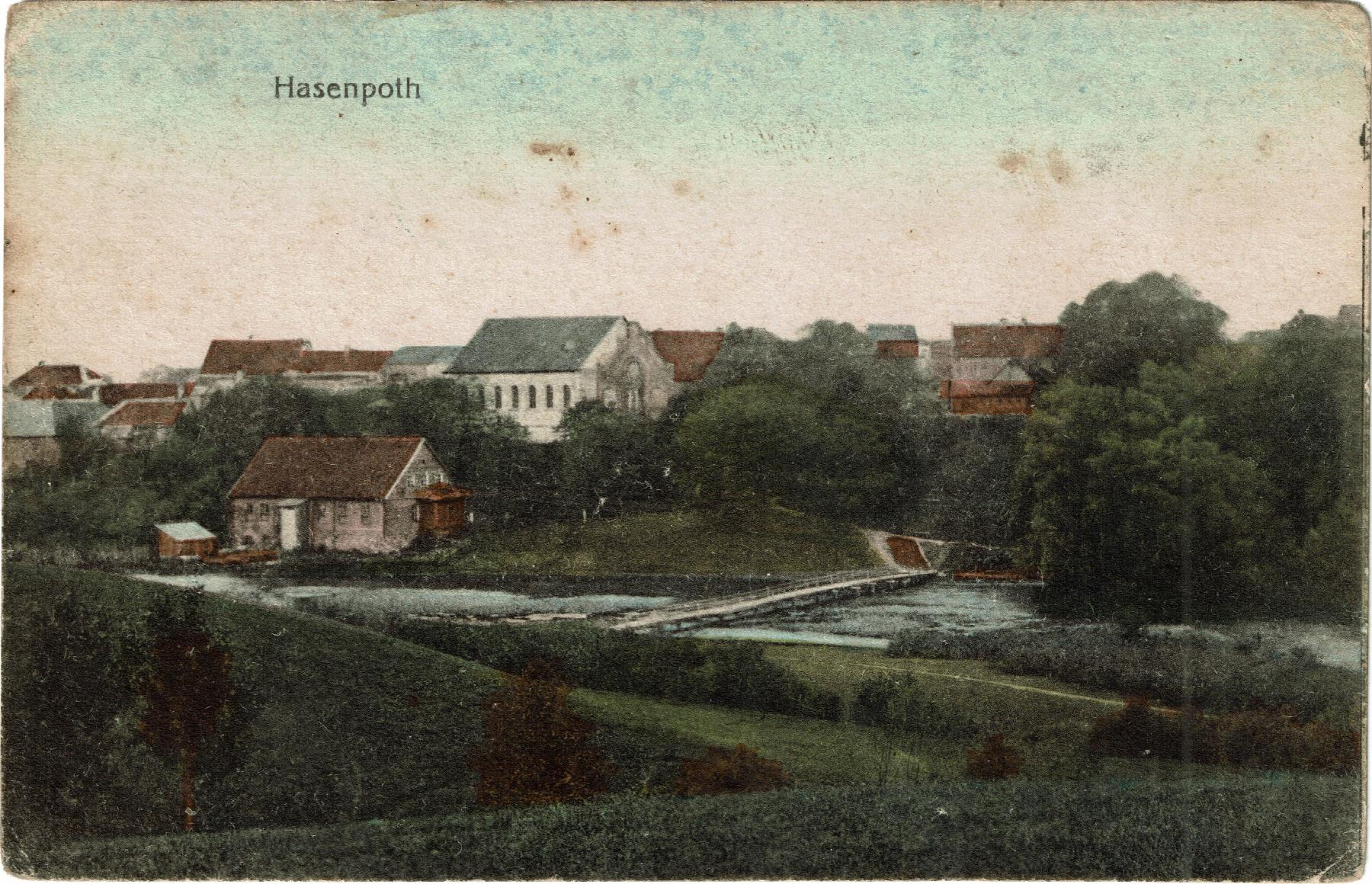
View of Aizpute in 1910 featuring the synagogue.

Units of the German Army Group North captured the town on June 28, 1941, just six days after the invasion of the Soviet Union. In this short period, only a part of the Jewish population managed to escape into the interior of the Soviet Union. At the start of the German occupation, more than 400 Jews were still in the town. On July 24, 1941, the Germans carried out the first anti-Jewish Aktion in Aizpute, in which 39 Jews and two Latvian women were taken to the woods near the local Jewish cemetery and shot.

Forces of the German Security Police outpost in Liepāja under the command of Wolfgang Kügler arrived in Aizpute on October 27, 1941, to shoot the remaining Jews there in collaboration with Latvian auxiliary police forces. Available sources indicate that the Jews of Aizpute had been gathered in the synagogue by the Latvian police on the day prior to the Aktion. To mislead them, the Jews had been informed that they would be transferred to another place and were permitted to take some hand luggage with them. The Latvian police ordered local truck drivers to transport the Jews (men, women, and children) and their belongings to the killing site located in a forest approximately 3.5 kilometers outside the town, near the railway station at Kalvene, where the execution squad waited. The Latvian policemen involved in this Aktion wore Aizsargi uniforms or civilian clothes. The Aktion lasted until late afternoon, and in total more than 330 Jews were shot. At the end of World War II, on May 9, 1945, Soviet occupying forces entered Aizpute. The remaining residents of Aizpute suffered from repressions and mass deportations organized by the authorities.

== Geography ==
Aizpute borders Aizpute Parish to the west, Kazdanga Parish to the east, and Laža Parish to the north and south. Roads connect Aizpute with Kuldīga, Skrunda, Kalvene, and Grobiņa. In 1819, Aizpute became the center of Aizpute county, which continued after the Latvian War of Independence, but in the Soviet period it became incorporated into Liepāja district. In 2009 Aizpute became the centre of Aizpute Municipality. Since 2021 it is a part of South Kurzeme Municipality.

Aizpute was established on the north-eastern edge of the Bandava hillocks in the Western Courland Uplands, on the high banks of the Tebra River, where the Tebra flows from the hills into the Apriķi Plain. The Laža, a tributary of the Tebra, flows along the eastern border of the town, where the Laža reservoir (19.8 ha) is located on the eastern side of Aizpute, while Misinkalns (95.4 m above sea level), with a relative height of about 40 m, rises on the western side. The width of the Tebra within the city limits reaches 5 m, with a depth of approximately 1 m. The Aizpute mill pond (3 ha) is located in the city center. A park has been created on Misiņkalns.

== Demographics ==
Historical population

Year	Pop.	±%
1797	1,015	—
1863	3,090	+204.4%
1881	3,690	+19.4%
1897	3,340	−9.5%
1914	4,200	+25.7%
1920	2,680	−36.2%
1925	3,346	+24.9%
1930	3,435	+2.7%
1935	3,418	−0.5%
1941	2,706	−20.8%
1959	4,441	+64.1%
1970	5,551	+25.0%
1979	5,979	+7.7%
1989	6,199	+3.7%

Year	Pop.	±%
2000	5,799	−6.5%
2010	5,160	−11.0%
2011	5,068	−1.8%
2012	4,983	−1.7%
2013	4,912	−1.4%
2014	4,837	−1.5%
2015	4,747	−1.9%
2016	4,633	−2.4%
2017	4,559	−1.6%
2018	4,443	−2.5%
2019	4,344	−2.2%
2020	4,293	−1.2%
2021	4,263	−0.7%
2022	4,128	−3.2%

The population of Aizpute has historically been affected by wars, plague, and famine. Around 1602, most of the town's inhabitants perished as a result of these adverse conditions. Subsequent wars and plague epidemics were also very devastating. In 1736, there were only 38 inhabited and 10 uninhabited houses in Aizpute, with a population of approximately 765. The town had seven streets, most of which were unpaved, and the houses had thatched roofs.

Starting in 1795, the population grew rapidly as Lithuanian Jews, who were allowed to settle in Aizpute, began to arrive. Their settlement was so rapid that the local population began to worry about their situation. In the first half of the 18th century, Jews made up two-thirds of the total population. From 1797 to 1798, they even had their own military "guard" in the city. Almost all trade in the city was controlled by Jews, but in later years their influence declined.

However, even in 1820, Aizpute had only 765 inhabitants. After that, the population grew rapidly, reaching 3,690 in 1881, but later declined to 3,340 in 1897. The opening of the Liepāja–Aizpute railway gave new impetus to the town's growth: in 1914, the population reached approximately 4,200. In 1920, Aizpute had 2,596 inhabitants, and in 1925, it had 3,346 inhabitants, of whom 2,370 were Latvians, 276 were Germans, 22 were Russians, 629 were Jews, 11 were Poles, 3 were Estonians, and 29 were Lithuanians. In 1935, the population was 3,418, of whom 73% were Latvians and 16% were Jews.

The demographic situation in Aizpute was severely affected during the Soviet and Nazi German occupations, as well as after the events of World War II. During the Nazi occupation, the Jewish population was almost completely destroyed, during the Soviet occupation, the Baltic German community was deported, and during the post-war Stalin era, a large part of the Latvian population was deported to Siberia. The population of Aizpute has historically grown gradually. Only during the years of Soviet occupation did it almost double.

== Notable people ==
- Daniel Hayyim Cleif (1729–1794), a Dutch-born Curonian rabbi.
- Heinrich Blumenthal (physician) (1804–1881), Baltic German physician
- Eduard von Keyserling (1855–1918), Baltic German writer, born at nearby Tāšu-Padure Manor
- Tatjana Barbakoff (1899–1944), ballet dancer
- Pēteris Vasks (born 1946), contemporary Latvian composer
- Ingrīda Circene (born 1956), politician, former Latvian Minister of Health
- Mareks Segliņš (born 1970), politician, former Minister of Justice and former Minister of the Interior.
- Mārtiņš Freimanis (1977–2011), musician and actor, spent his childhood in Aizpute
- Helvijs Lūsis (born 1987), bobsledder
- Anton Zabolotny (born 1991), Russian footballer, played over 330 games plus 19 for Russia
- Klāvs Bethers (born 2003), footballer

== Twin towns — sister cities ==
Aizpute is twinned with:

- Schwerzenbach, Switzerland
- Karlskrona, Sweden

== See also ==
- List of cities in Latvia
