= Tāšu-Padure Manor =

Manor house in Latvia

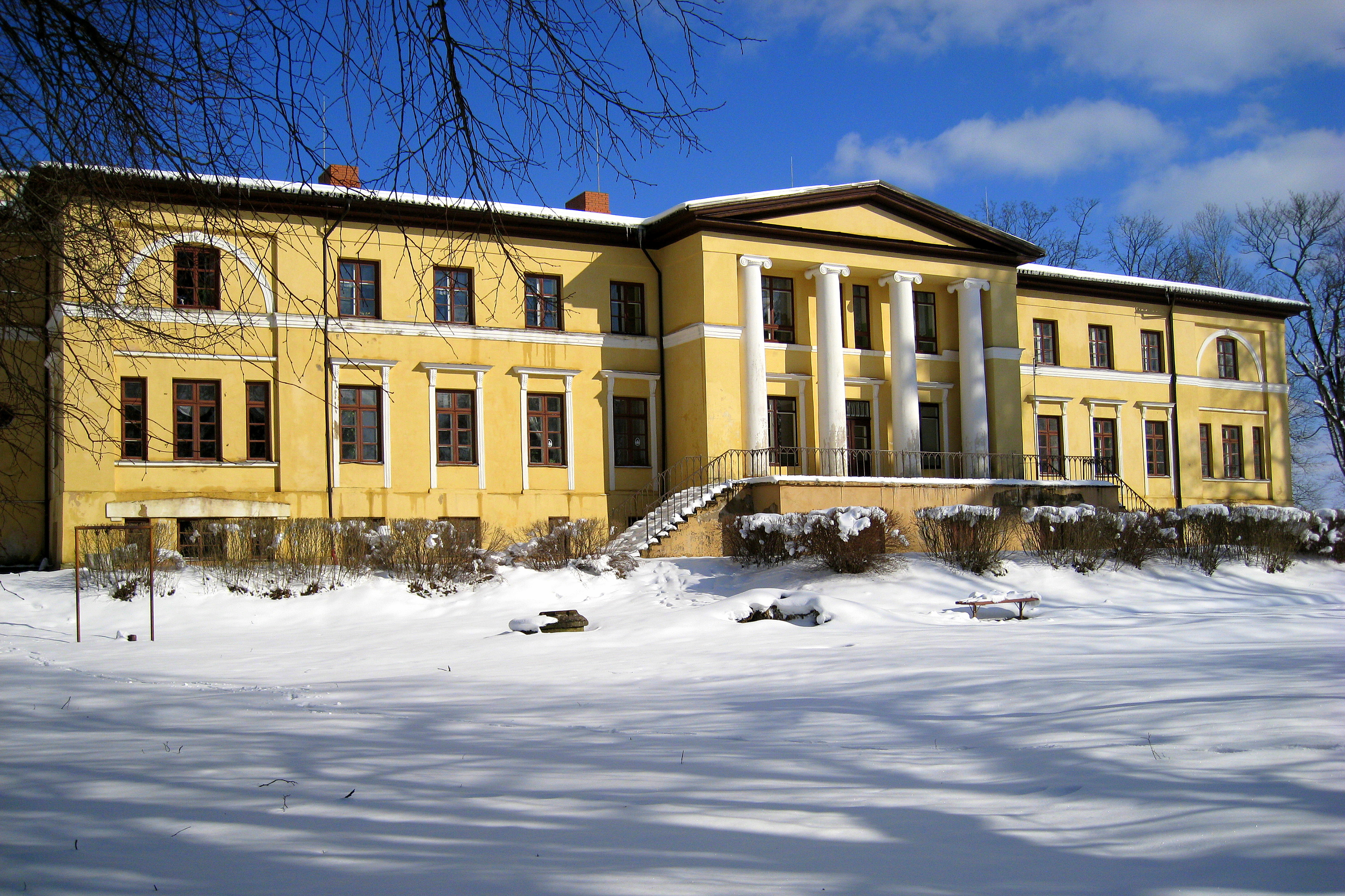
- Tāšu-Padure Manor

- Location within Latvia

General information
- Architectural style: Classicism
- Location: Kalvene Parish, South Kurzeme Municipality, Latvia
- Coordinates: 56°36′14″N 21°43′59″E
- Client: von Keyserling family

Tāšu-Padure (Schloss Tels–Paddern, Tāšu-Padures muižas pils) is located in the village Kalvene, Kalvene Parish, South Kurzeme Municipality, in the Courland region of Latvia. It belonged to the von Keyserling family and it has been hosting the elementary school of Kalvene since 1922.

Baltic German writer Eduard von Keyserling was born and grew up in the castle.

== History ==
The castle was built in the first half of the 19th century for the von Korff family in a classicist architecture.

It was acquired by the von Keyserling family in 1852.

The manor was surrounded by a park of 10 hectares and served as summer residence and hunting lodge.

Count Eduard von Keyserling was born in Tāšu-Padure in 1855 and spent his childhood in the castle.

After the independence of Latvia in 1918 and the land expropriation act passed by the Constituent Assembly of Latvia on 16 September 1920, the Keyserlings are expropriated and the building is transformed into a school in 1922.
