= Vivian Naefe =

German film director (born 1953)

- Born: 21 March 1953 (age 72); Hamburg, West Germany
- Occupation: Film director
- Years active: 1981–present

Vivian Naefe (born 21 March 1953) is a German film director. Her films include the Wild Chicks series (based on novels by Cornelia Funke), Waves (based on the novel Wellen by Eduard von Keyserling), and two episodes of the police procedural television series Tatort.

== Selected filmography ==
- Tatort – "Blutiger Asphalt" (1995, TV series episode)
- Four for Venice (1998)
- Tatort – "Kleine Diebe" (2000, TV series episode)
- Waves (2005, TV film)
- Wild Chicks (2006)
- Wild Chicks in Love (2007)
- The Wild Chicks and Life (2009)
- Das Quartett (2019–22, four episodes of TV series)
