= Lasmanis =

Lasmanis is a Latvian surname, its female form is Lasmane. Notable people with the surname include:

- Kārlis Lasmanis (born 1994), Latvian basketball player
- Uģis Lasmanis (born 1967), Latvian rower
- Lidija Doroņina-Lasmane (born 1925), Latvian dissident
