= H.H. Keyserling =

H.H. Keyserling (1866–1944), also known as Count Henry Hugo Keyserling or The Whaler, was part of the noble Baltic German Keyserlingk family dating back to the 12th century. (The Keyserlingk surname frequently appears as Keyserling and sometimes as Kejzerling.) His complete name was Heinrich Jeannot Otto Hugo Eugen von Keyserlingk.

H.H. Keyserling was born in what today is the Baltic country of Lithuania. He inherited the family estate, called Staniuny, after his older brother, Eugen, who had first rights, declined the estate. After graduating in 1888 from the Imperial Russian Naval Academy in St. Petersburg, Henry joined the Imperial Navy and served in the Pacific. In 1892 he left the navy and learned whaling while working incognito as a sailor aboard a Norwegian whaling ship. Keyserling subsequently negotiated a whaling concession with Korea. He also negotiated a 21-year whaling concession with Russia covering various areas of the Siberian coastline. Keyserling operated his whaling business from the late 1800s until the 1904 Russo-Japanese War, when his ships were captured by Japan and he received no compensation. In 1906 he founded a company in Vladivostok called the Pacific Ocean Shipping Company (also known as Steam Navigation of H.H. Keyserling) that carried freight and passengers from Vladivostok to the Kamchatka peninsula and places in between. Keyserling is believed to have owned between 5 and 10 steamships at the beginning of World War I. Two of his ships are known to have been named Oleg and Georg. During the Bolshevik revolution Keyserling had his steamships requisitioned by Russia without compensation.
