= Joseph Bach =

Hungarian rabbi (1784–1866)

Joseph Bach (1784, Buda – February 3, 1866, Pest) was a Hungarian rabbi. After I. N. Mannheimer, he was the first German preacher of a Jewish congregation in Austria-Hungary.

In Alt-Ofen, his birthplace, he began to ground himself early in life in the study of the Talmud. Without the aid of a teacher he studied several foreign languages; after which he attended the University of Prague, remaining there 12 years. Then he returned to his home town, where he married the daughter of a wealthy family, and settled down as a merchant. It was not long, however, before he lost his entire fortune and was left penniless. Destitute of the means of subsistence, he was constrained to accept a situation as teacher. In 1827, despite having never studied homiletics, and had never heard or read a sermon, he was appointed first preacher at the newly organized synagogue of Pest, where he officiated for over thirty years. Many of his sermons have been published. An autobiography, with a preface by Kayserling, was published by his son in Budapest.
