= Tebra River =

River in Latvia

Coordinates: 56°35′25″N 21°44′1″E

Latvian: Tebra
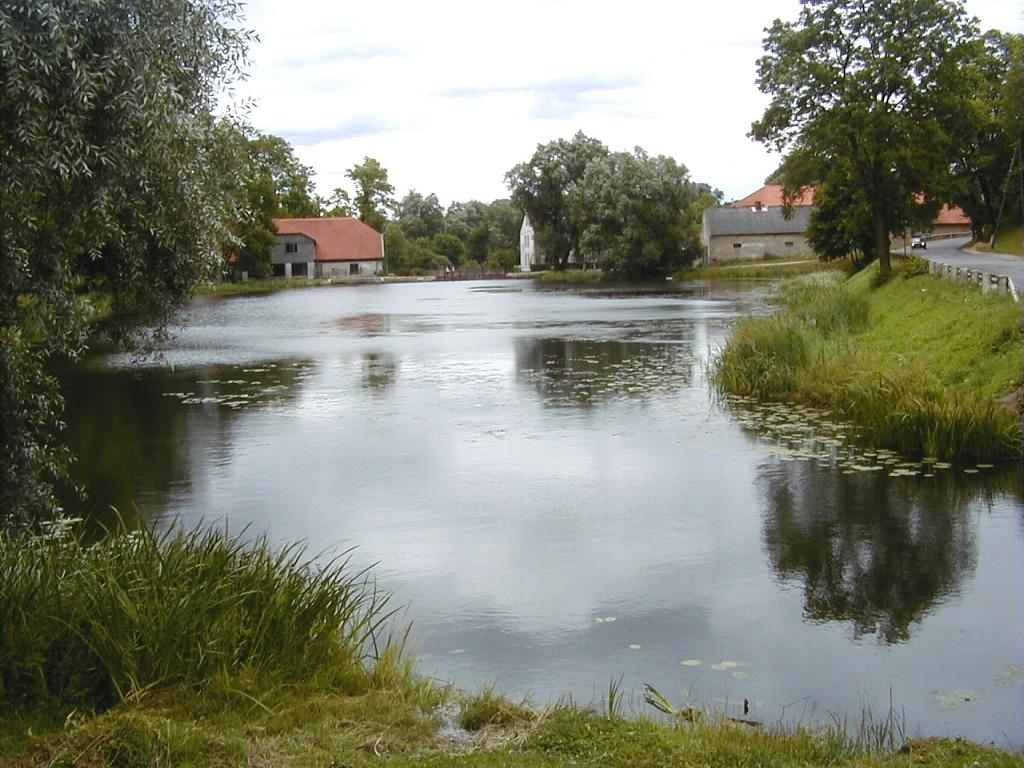
- Tebra River near Aizpute, Latvia

Location
- Country: Latvia

Physical characteristics
- Source
  - location: Lake Podnieki
  - elevation: 93.8 m
- Mouth
  - location: Saka
  - elevation: 0.2 m
- Length: 69 km (43 mi)
- Basin size: 584.6 km^{2} (225.7 sq mi)
- Discharge
  - average: 0,18 km^{3}

The Tebra is a river in the South Kurzeme Municipality of Courland, Latvia. Its source is Podnieki Lake in the Kalvene Parish of western Latvia. Several large populated areas are located on the banks of the Tebra river, including Aizpute, Štakeldanga, and Apriki. The river is crossed by the P112 motorway.

In the middle of the river there is a pronounced valley, which reaches depth of 10 to 20 m and has many ponds. There is a water reservoir (mill pond) Aizpute. The main tributaries are the rivers Aloxte (right) and Grabstes (left). Near the settlement of Saka the river merges with the Durbe, forming the Saka River.
