= Aizpute Municipality =

Former municipality of Latvia

Coordinates: 56°43′N 21°36′E

Aizpute Municipality Aizputes novads
- Municipality
- Flag Coat of arms

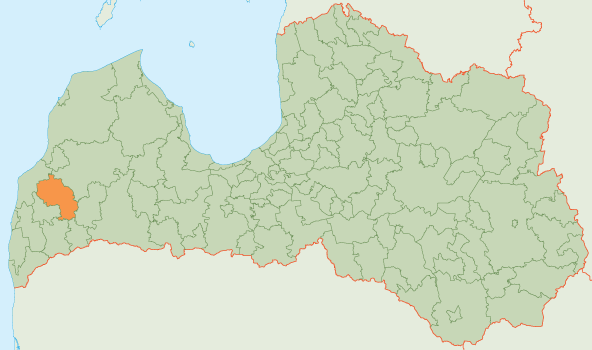
- Country: Latvia
- Formed: 2009
- Dissolved: 2021
- Centre: Aizpute

Government
  - Council Chair (last): Juris Grasmanis (NA)

Area
  - Total: 640.10 km^{2} (247.14 sq mi)
  - Land: 614.50 km^{2} (237.26 sq mi)
  - Water: 25.6 km^{2} (9.9 sq mi)

Population (2021)
  - Total: 8,083
  - Density: 13.15/km^{2} (34.07/sq mi)
- Website: aizpute.lv

Aizpute Municipality (Latvian: Aizputes novads) was a municipality in Courland, Latvia. The municipality was formed in 2009 by merging Aizpute town, Aizpute parish, Cīrava parish, Kalvene parish, Kazdanga parish and Laža parish. The administrative centre was Aizpute. The population in 2020 was 8,057.

Aizpute Municipality ceased to exist on 1 July 2021, when it was merged into the newly formed South Kurzeme Municipality.

== Notable people ==
Latvian dissident and 2018 Nobel Peace Prize nominee Lidija Doroņina-Lasmane was born in Aizpute Municipality.

== Twin towns — sister cities ==
The town of Aizpute is twinned with:

- Schwerzenbach, Switzerland
- Karlskrona, Sweden

== See also ==
- Administrative divisions of Latvia (2009)
