= Alexander von Keyserling =

Baltic German geologist and paleontologist (1815–1891)

Graf Alexander von Keyserling
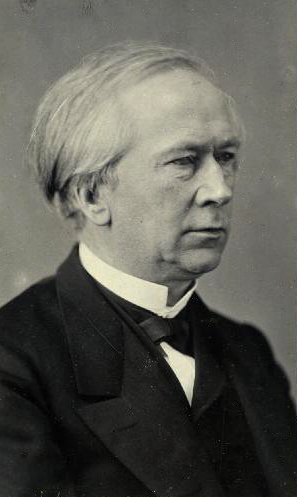
- Portrait taken by Georg Friedrich Schlater, before 1870
- Born: 27 August [O.S. 15 August] 1815; Kabillen Manor, Kabillen, Kreis Talsen, Courland Governorate, Russian Empire (now Kabile, Kuldīga Municipality, Latvia)
- Died: 20 May [O.S. 8 May] 1891; Rayküll Manor, Rayküll, Kreis Harrien, Governorate of Estonia, Russian Empire (now Raikküla, Rapla County, Estonia)
- Citizenship: Russian Empire; German Confederation; German Empire
- Education: Humboldt University of Berlin
- Scientific career
- Fields: Geology; Botany
- Author abbrev. (botany): Keyserl.

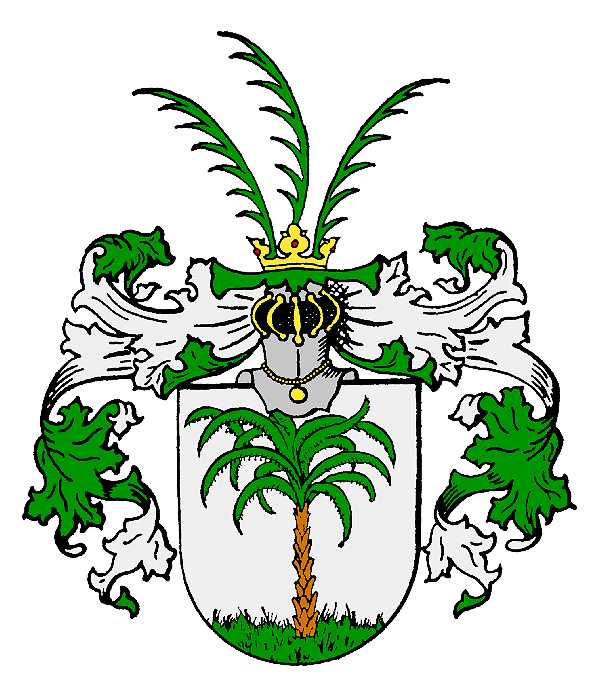
Coat of arms of the Uradel Keyserlingk family in the Adelslexikon.

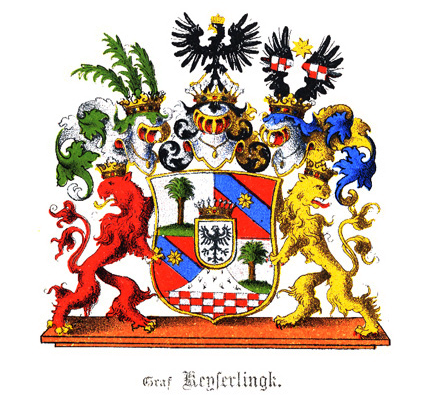
Coat of arms of the Prussian counts of the Keyserlingk family, in the Baltic coat of arms book by Carl Arvid von Klingspor in 1882

Alexander Friedrich Michael Lebrecht Nikolaus Arthur Graf von Keyserling (15 August 1815 – 8 May 1891) was a Baltic German geologist and paleontologist from the Keyserlingk family of Baltic German nobility.

== Career ==
Alexander von Keyserling was born on 27 August [O.S. 15 August] 1815 at the Kabillen Manor, Kabillen, Courland Governorate (in present-day Kabile, Kuldīga Municipality, Latvia), then part of the Russian Empire. His father was Count Heinrich Diedrich Wilhelm von Keyserling, 3rd Count of Rautenburg, was a spokesman, Kreismarschall and Landbotenmarschall in Courland, his mother was Baroness Anna Amalie Benigna von Nolde. His family was of Westphalian origin and was originated in Herford, they were considered part of the Uradel, or old nobility. The first ever mentioned member was Albert Keserlink (1443-1467 or 1468), the mayor of Herford. Alexander belonged to the House of Rautenburg-Telsen-Paddern, which was a subdivided branch of the Prussian comital branch. The branch's founder Dietrich II von Keyserling, Herr auf Okten und Ligutten, was elevated to count in 1786. Dietrich's father Heinrich Christian also inherited the title of Count of Rautenburg, although Alexander didn't inherit the title since he was the 10th child in the family, his elder brother Otto Ulrich Johann inherited the title.

Alexander studied at the Humboldt University of Berlin, here he met with future German Chancellor Otto von Bismarck and John Lothrop Motley, with whom he became lifelong friends.

Alexander is considered to be one of the founders of Russian geology. He made many expeditions on behalf of Nicholas I of Russia in Estonia, northern Russia, and the Urals (1839-1846).

He was also a botanist and zoologist who wrote Die wirbelthiere Europa's (Vertebrates of Europe) with Johann Heinrich Blasius. This work was published in 1840.

Alexander's nephews include diplomat Heinrich von Keyserlingk and writer Eduard von Keyserling. Archibald von Keyserling, the first leader of the Latvian Navy, was his brother Eduard Ernst Hermann von Keyserling's grandson. Philosopher Hermann von Keyserling was his grandson.

== Evolution ==
Keyserling was an advocate of the transmutation of species. In 1853, he wrote an article which suggested that species arose from the activity of "alien molecules" acting on the embryo. He believed that such molecules were transported by miasma. In the third edition of On the Origin of Species published in 1861, Charles Darwin added a Historical Sketch that acknowledged the ideas of Keyserling.

Darwin sent a copy of his book to Keyserling who was skeptical about the role of natural selection in evolution. By 1886, however, he embraced most of Darwin's ideas claiming "I renounced my views which contradicted Darwin's theory, and I consider that the changes of the embryo arise not by means of external action of certain molecules but by the influence of selection and heredity."

== Legacy ==
Keyserling is commemorated in the scientific name of a species of gecko, Teratoscincus keyserlingii.

== See also ==
- List of Baltic German scientists

== Sources ==
- von Stackelberg, Otto Magnus (1930). Genealogische Handbuch der baltischen Ritterschaften. Teil Estland, Band I (in German). Starke Verlag, Görlitz. pp. 140–144.
- Stavenhagen, Oskar (1930). Genealogische Handbuch der baltischen Ritterschaften. Teil Kurland, Band II. Starke Verlag, Görlitz. pp. 118–149. (de)
