= Hermann von Keyserling =

German philosopher (1880–1946)

Hermann Graf von Keyserling
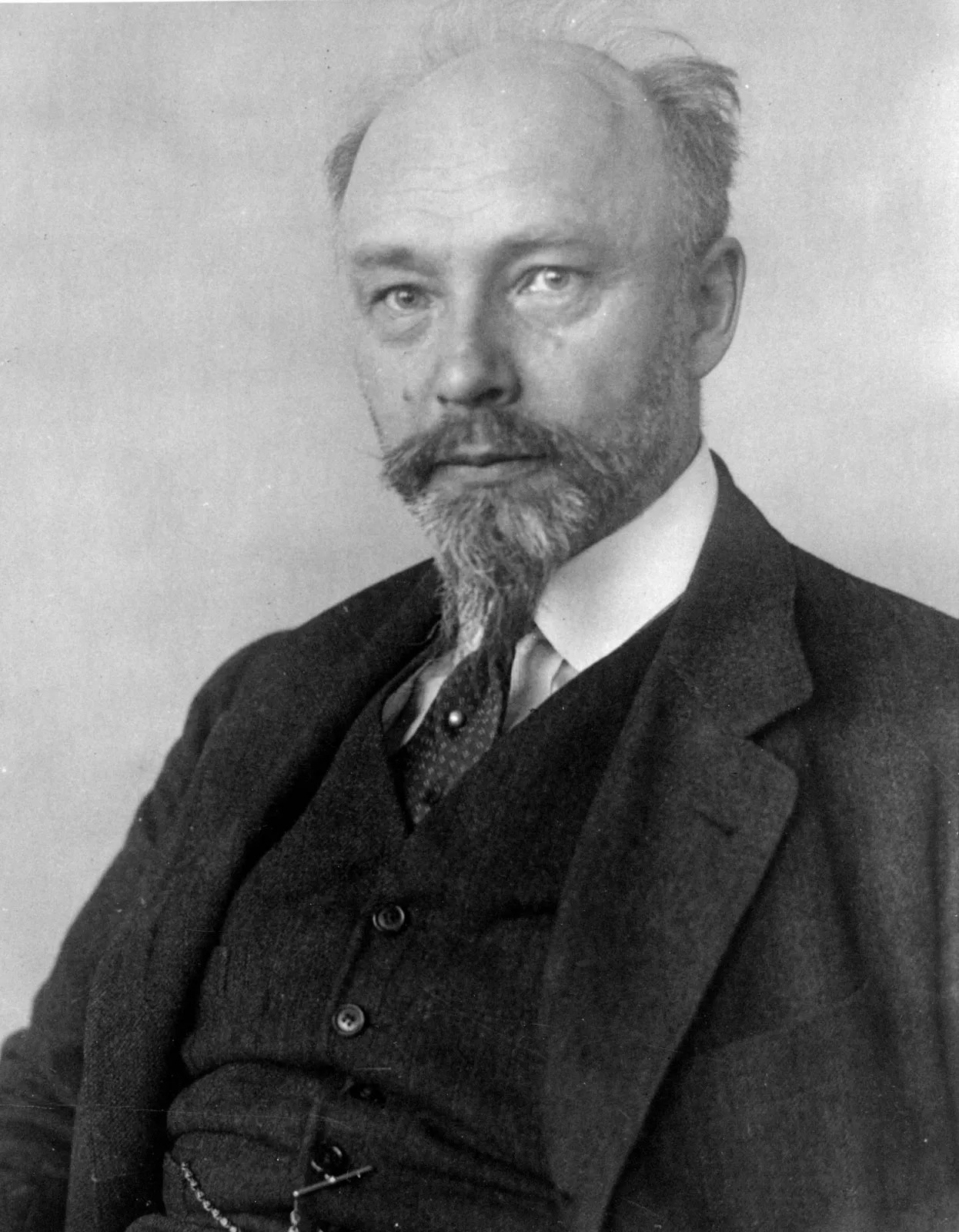
- Born: 20 July [O.S. 8 July] 1880; Könno Manor, Könno, Kreis Pernau, Governorate of Livonia, Russian Empire (in present-day Könno, Parnu County, Estonia)
- Died: 26 April 1946 (aged 65); Innsbruck, French Zone, Allied-occupied Austria

Philosophical work
- Era: 20th-century philosophy
- Region: Western philosophy

Hermann Alexander Graf von Keyserling (20 July [O.S. 8 July] 1880 – 26 April 1946) was a Baltic German philosopher from the Keyserlingk family. His grandfather, Alexander von Keyserling, was a notable geologist of Imperial Russia.

== Life ==
Keyserling was born to a wealthy aristocratic family in the Könno Manor, Kreis Pernau in Governorate of Livonia, Russian Empire, now in Estonia. After his education at the universities of Dorpat (Tartu), Heidelberg, and Vienna, he took a trip around the world. He married Countess Maria Goedela von Bismarck-Schönhausen, granddaughter of Otto von Bismarck. His son Arnold von Keyserling followed his fathers footsteps and became a renowned philosopher.

Hermann Keyserling interested himself in natural science and in philosophy, and before World War I he was known both as a student of geology and as a popular essayist. The Russian Revolution deprived him of his estate in Livonia, and with the remains of his fortune he founded the Gesellschaft für Freie Philosophie (Society for Free Philosophy) at Darmstadt. The mission of this school was to bring about the intellectual reorientation of Germany.

He was the first to use the term Führerprinzip. One of Keyserling's central claims was that certain "gifted individuals" were "born to rule" on the basis of Social Darwinism.

Although not a doctrinaire pacifist, Keyserling believed that the old German policy of militarism was dead for all time and that Germany's only hope lay in the adoption of international, democratic principles. His best-known work is the Reisetagebuch eines Philosophen ("Travel-journal of a Philosopher", 1919). The book also describes his travels in Asia, America and Southern Europe.

He died at Innsbruck, Austria.

== Works ==
- Reisetagebuch eines Philosophen [Travel Journal of a Philosopher] (in German).
- Das Buch vom Ursprung [The Book of the Origin] (in German).
- Schöpferische Erkenntnis [Creative Knowledge] (in German).
- Südamerikanische Meditationen [South American Meditations] (in German).
- Einführung in die Schule der Weisheit [An Introduction to the School of Wisdom] (in German).
- Philosophie als Kunst [Philosophy as Art] (in German).
- La Révolution mondiale et la responsabilité de l'esprit [The Global Revolution and the Responsibility of the Spirit] (in French).
- Das Buch vom persönlichen Leben [The Book of Personal Life] (in German).
- Betrachtungen der Stille und Besinnlichkeit [Reflections of Silence and Contemplation] (in German).
- Reise durch die Zeit (Memoiren) [Journey Through Time: A Memoir] (in German). (1958).
- Das Spektrum Europas [The Spectrum of Europe] (in German).
- Das Gefüge der Welt: Versuch einer kritischen Philosophie [The Fabric of the World: Attempt at a Critical Philosophy] (in German).
