= Kõnnu, Pärnu County =

Village in Estonia

Coordinates: 58°43′N 24°49′E

- Village
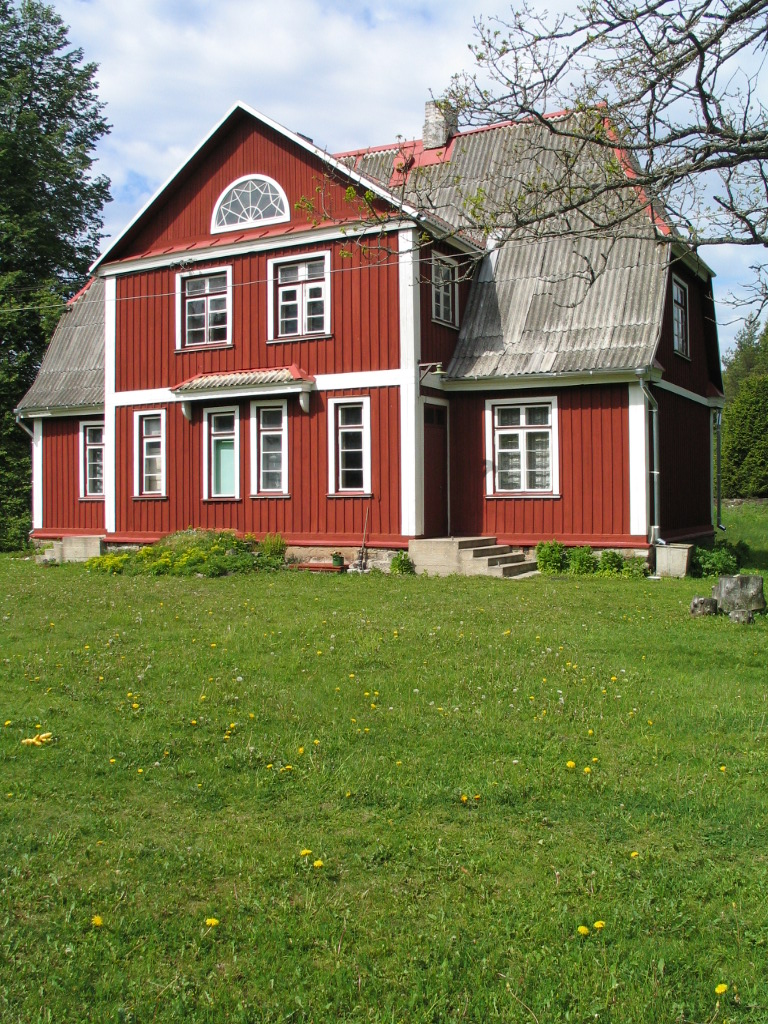
- The former Kõnnu station building
- Interactive map of Kõnnu, Pärnu County
- Country: Estonia
- County: Pärnu County
- Parish: Põhja-Pärnumaa Parish
- Time zone: UTC+2 (EET)
  - Summer (DST): UTC+3 (EEST)

Kõnnu (German: Könno) is a village in Põhja-Pärnumaa Parish, Pärnu County in western-central Estonia.

It had a station on the Tallinn - Pärnu railway line operated by Elron, which closed in December 2018.

Philosopher Hermann von Keyserling (1880–1946) was born in Kõnnu Manor.
