= Old Live Oak Cemetery =

Cemetery in Selma, Alabama

- Interactive map of Old Live Oak Cemetery

Details
- Location: Selma, Alabama
- Country: United States
- Coordinates: 32.40531°N 87.03203°W
- Website: Official website
- Find a Grave: Old Live Oak Cemetery

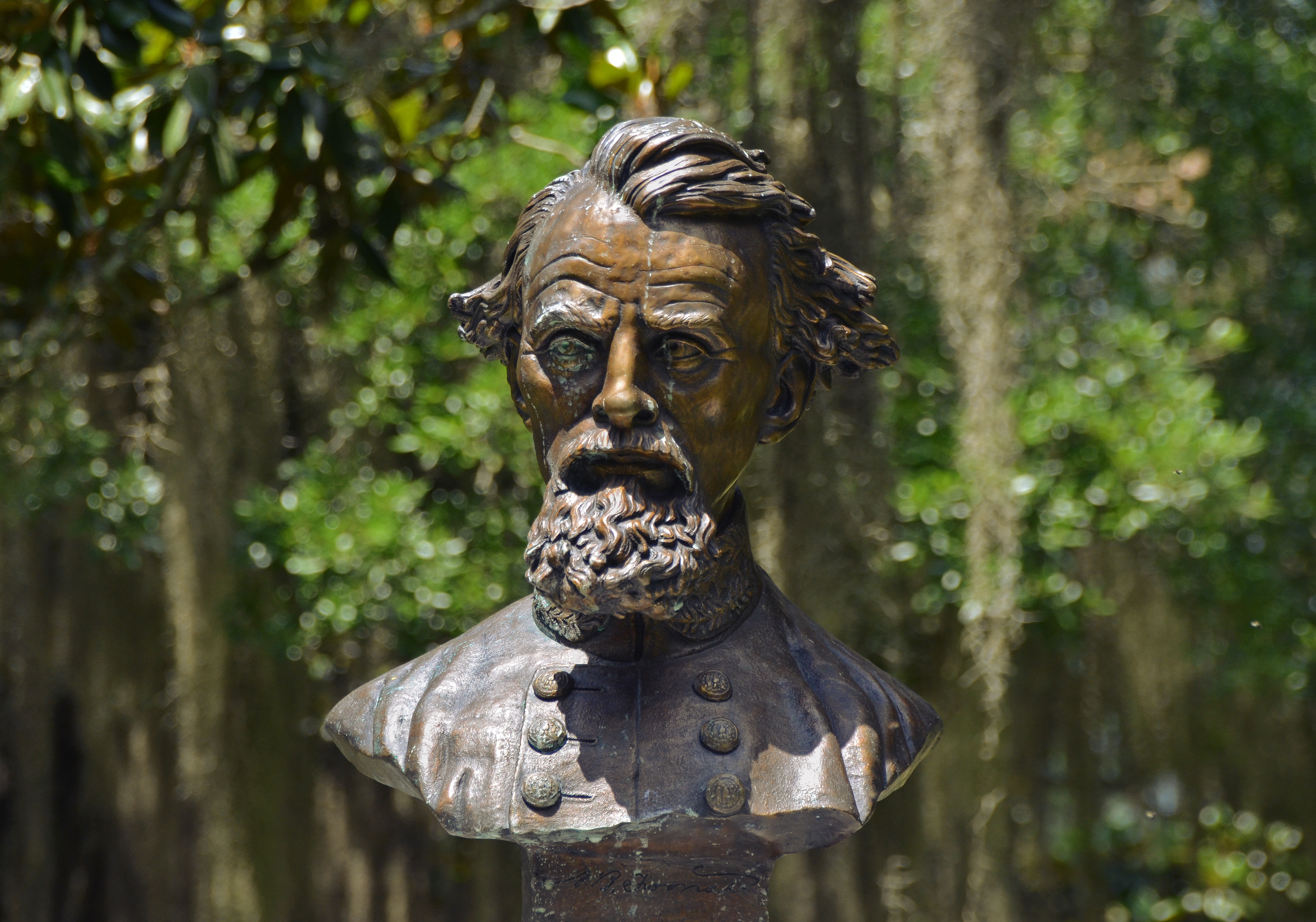
Bust of Nathan Bedford Forrest in Old Live Oak Cemetery.

Old Live Oak Cemetery is a historic cemetery in Selma, Alabama founded in 1829 and expanded in 1877. The newer portion is sometimes called New Live Oak Cemetery and the cemetery is collectively known as Live Oak Cemetery. It contains burials of Confederate States of America leaders, as well Benjamin Sterling Turner, a formerly enslaved African-American who served as U.S. Representative for Alabama during the Reconstruction era. The cemetery is at 110 Dallas Avenue approximately 0.7 miles (1.1 km) west of downtown Selma.

== Notable burials ==
- Robert Woodward Barnswell (1849–1902) Episcopal Bishop of Alabama
- Katharine Hopkins Chapman (1870–1930), author and historian
- William Joseph Hardee (1815–1873) Confederate Lt. General from Camden County, Georgia whose published military battlefield tactics were used by military commanders from both the North and the South.
- Catesby ap Roger Jones (1821–1877) Confederate Naval Captain who commanded the famous ironclad warship the USS Merrimack (1855) during its first battle versus the Union vessel the USS Monitor.
- William R. King (1786–1853) 13th Vice-president of the United States. Historians have speculated that King was likely the first gay U.S. vice president and possibly one of the first gay members of the U.S. House of Representatives and the U.S. Senate. A lifelong bachelor, King lived for 15 years in the home of future U.S. president James Buchanan while the two served in the Senate. Buchanan, also a lifelong bachelor, is believed by some historians to be the nation's first gay president.
- John Tyler Morgan (1824–1907) CSA General, then six-term U.S. senator after the war. An ex-slave holder, he was an ardent racist and an advocate for Jim Crow laws and racial segregation.
- Ann Weaver Norton (1905–1982) sculptor, educator, and writer of children's books
- Benjamin Sterling Turner (1825–1894) The first African American U.S. Congressman from Alabama. Turner was born into slavery in North Carolina and taken to Selma by his owner as a child. He remained enslaved until the end of the Civil War. Turner spent much of his congressional career seeking financial aid for his broken southern state. He advocated racially mixed schools and financial reparation for former slaves.

== Confederate Circle ==
The graves of soldiers are to the south of the Confederate Soldier Monument, with cannons pointing north, forever protecting the deceased Confederates. Elodie Todd Dawson, buried nearby, was head of the Ladies Memorial Association (later the United Daughters of the Confederacy) and spearheaded the effort to build the $5,500 Confederate Monument in the cemetery. 155 soldier bodies were moved from elsewhere to be around the monument.

== Other Confederate monuments ==
- Jefferson Davis Memorial Chair in the form of a carved stone chair
- Forrest Memorial (2000) inscribed in part "Defender of Selma, Wizard of the Saddle, Untutored Genius, The First with the Most, This Monument stands as a testament of our perpetual devotion and respect for Lt Gen. Nathan Bedford Forrest ... One of the South's finest heroes."

== Elodie Todd Dawson Monument ==
The Elodie Todd Dawson Monument marks the graves of Elodie Todd Dawson (April 1, 1844 – November 14, 1881) and her husband Confederate Col. Nathaniel H. R. Dawson (1829–1895). Elodie Todd Dawson was the half-sister of Mary Todd Lincoln, wife of President Abraham Lincoln.

After the war Nathaniel Dawson was appointed U.S. Commissioner of Education, the first from Alabama. Nathaniel Dawson also served as a member of the Alabama legislature which included serving as Speaker of the House. He was an organizer in the Democratic Party. Dawson was considered a leading citizen of Selma who raised money for Selma's Charity Hospital and Dallas Academy. He was a church leader at St. Paul's Episcopal Church, where his funeral was held.

In 2015, the Elodie Todd Dawson sculpture was named one of Alabama's "most photographed cemetery monuments".

== The Pigeon House ==
A structure also called the Spring House for when it was used, sits near the Confederate Soldiers Monument. The unusual name arises from the gables that were designed as bird houses, since closed to preserve the structure. The building was used for Confederate Memorial Day band concerts and programs each spring. It is now used for storage.

== See also ==
- List of burial places of presidents and vice presidents of the United States
- List of Confederate monuments and memorials
