= Kabile Parish =

Parish of Latvia

- parish of Latvia
- Coat of arms

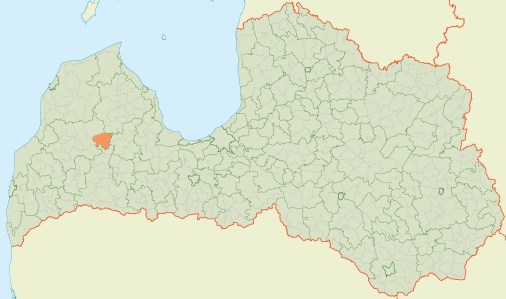
- 56°57′36″N 22°21′14″E
- Country: Latvia

Area
  - Total: 178.76 km^{2} (69.02 sq mi)
  - Land: 176.14 km^{2} (68.01 sq mi)
  - Water: 2.62 km^{2} (1.01 sq mi)

Population (1 January 2025)
  - Total: 638
  - Density: 3.62/km^{2} (9.38/sq mi)

Kabile Parish (Latvian: Kabiles pagasts) is an administrative unit of Kuldīga Municipality in the Courland region of Latvia. The parish has a population of 870 (as of 1/07/2010) and covers an area of 178.98 km^{2}.

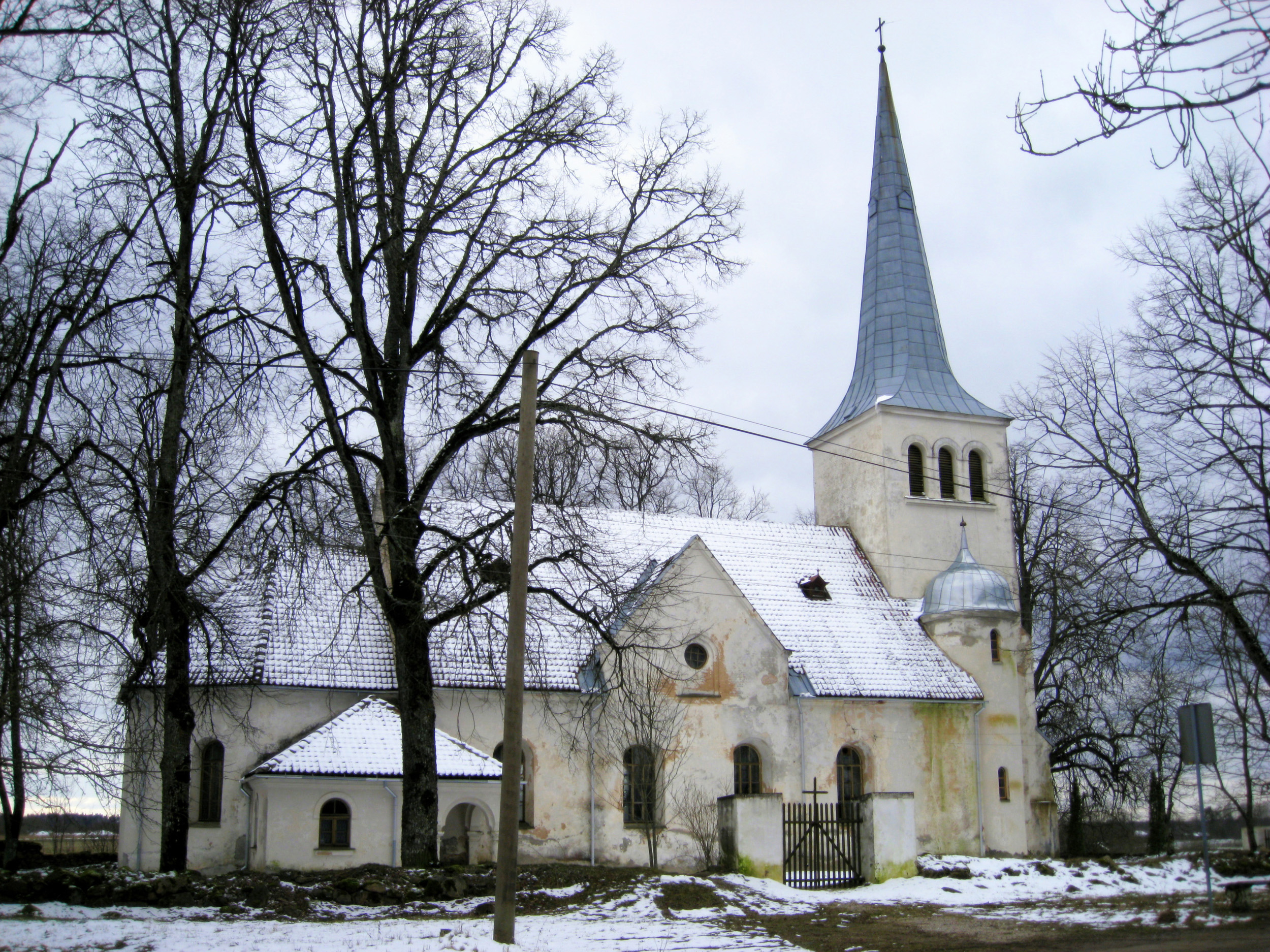
Kabile Lutheran church in Jaunāmuiža village

== Villages of Kabile parish ==
- Galamuiža
- Jaunāmuiža
- Kabile
- Kalnansi
- Kāņmuiža
- Leiši
- Meķi
- Pusgaldiņi
- Vecāmuiža
- Višļi

== Notable sights and places ==
- Kabile Manor
