= Daniel Hayyim Cleif =

Curonian rabbi

Personal life
- Born: 1729 Amsterdam, Dutch Republic
- Died: 14 May 1794 (aged 64–65) Amsterdam, Dutch Republic

Religious life
- Religion: Judaism

Daniel Hayyim Cleif (Hebrew: דניאל בן חיים קליף, romanized: Dani'el ben Ḥayyim Kleef; 1729 – 14 May 1794) was a Dutch-born Curonian rabbi.

== Biography ==
Cleif was born in Amsterdam in 1729. He settled in Hasenpoth, Courland, originally as a jeweler; later he officiated there as rabbi for many years. At this time he wrote Arugah ketannah ('The Small Garden-Bed'), a booklet in which the 248 positive commandments are formulated in rime (Altona, 1787, and reprinted several times). He also left in manuscript a commentary on the Torah.

One of Cleif's sons was a physician in the service of the Russian government, with the title of councilor of state, who died in the Orel Governorate in 1846.
