= Kabile Manor =

Manor house in Kuldīga Municipality, Latvia

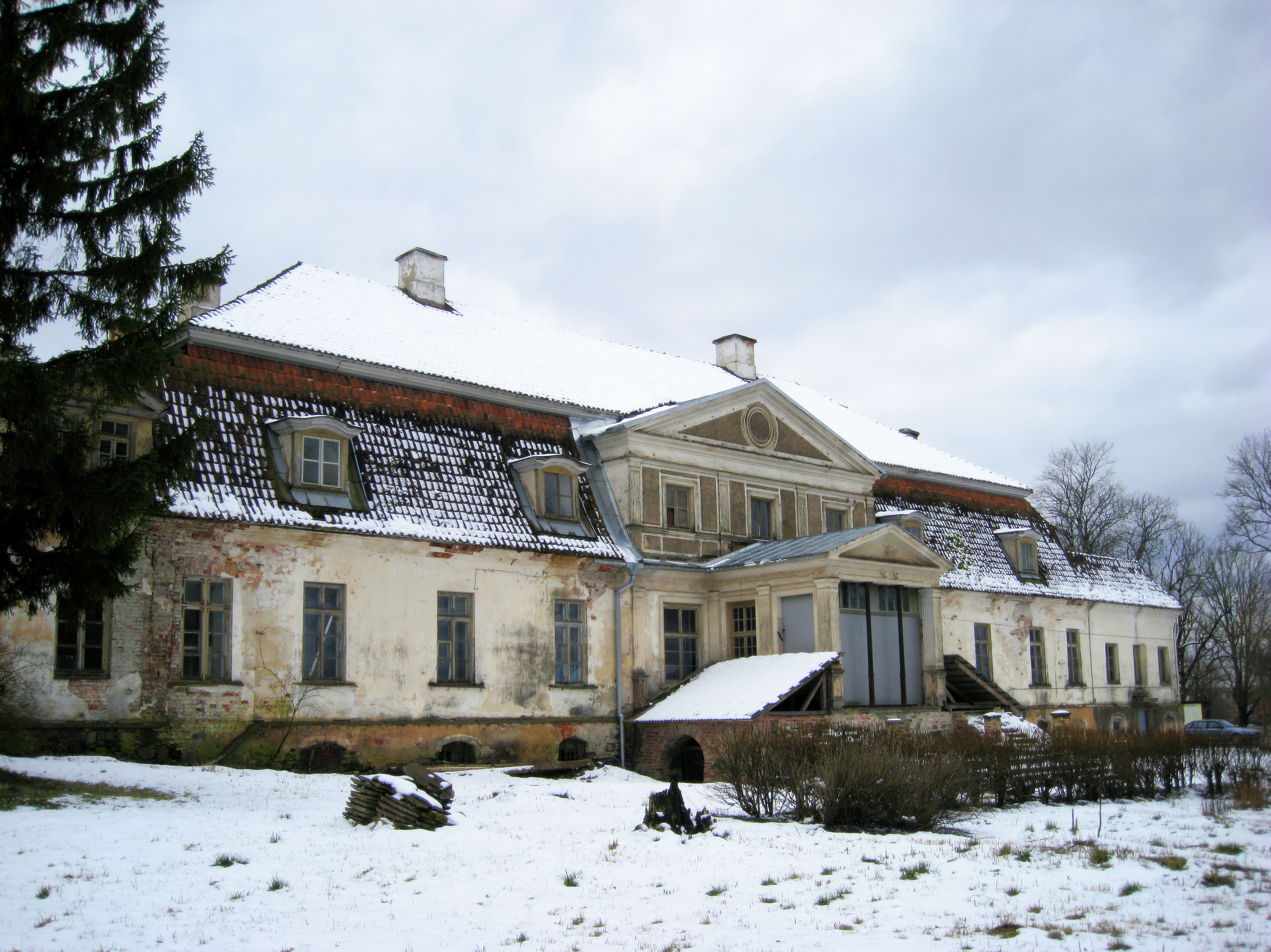
- Interactive map of the Kabile Manor area

General information
- Architectural style: Baroque
- Location: Kabile parish, Kuldīga municipality, Latvia
- Coordinates: 56°57′00″N 22°24′02″E
- Construction started: 1734
- Completed: 1740
- Client: Juliana Eleonora von Behr

Kabile Manor (Latvian: Kabiles muižas pils German: Kabillen) is a manor house located in Kuldīga Municipality, Kabile Parish, in the historical region of Courland, in western Latvia.

== History ==
Built in Baroque style between 1734 and 1740 for Eleonora von Behr, it was remodeled in the 1860s. Unique 18th century interiors of manor has been preserved. Vaulted cellars of Kabile Manor has been storing wine since manor house has been built. Now manor has fully operational cidery and winery.

== See also ==
- List of castles in Latvia
