= Arnold Keyserling =

German theologian (1922–2005)

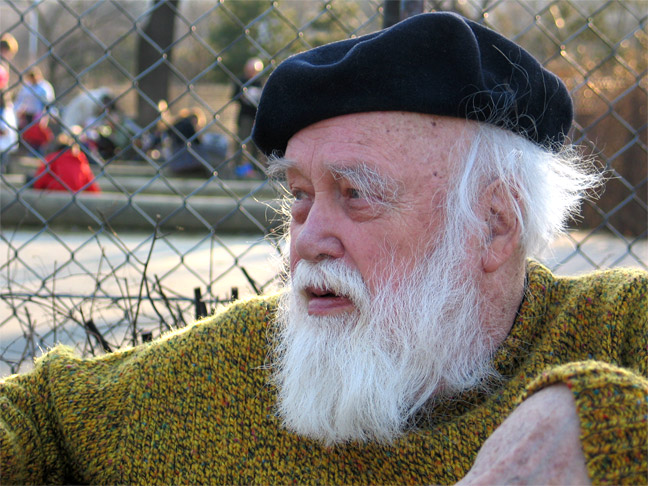
- Born: February 9, 1922; Hamburg, Germany
- Died: September 7, 2005 (aged 83)

Philosophical work
- Era: 20th-century philosophy
- Region: Western philosophy

Arnold Alexander Herbert Otto Heinrich Constantin Graf von Keyserling (February 9, 1922 in Hamburg – September 7, 2005 in Matrei, Tyrol), better known as Arnold Keyserling, was a German philosopher and theologian. He was the son of Hermann von Keyserling and great-grandson of Otto von Bismarck.

== See also ==
- Bismarck family
