= Wellen (novel) =

1911 novel by Eduard von Keyserling

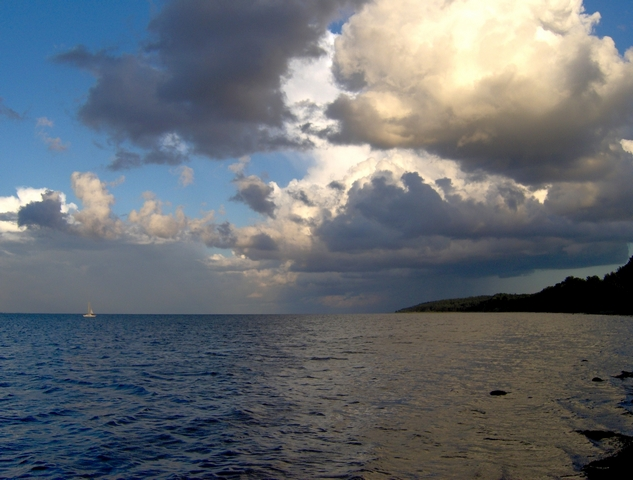
The Baltic Sea near the Bay of Puck, a likely setting for Keyserling's Wellen

Wellen (lit. Waves) is a novel by Eduard von Keyserling that was first published in German in 1911. Set during a long hot summer in a small fishing village somewhere on the Baltic Sea, most likely on the Curonian Spit, it depicts a group of aristocratic city-dwellers spending their holidays in that remote part of the German Empire. However, rather than painting a rural idyll, Keyserling focuses on the follies of a doomed fin de siècle society whose self-imposed repressions eventually lead to catastrophe.

It was published in English as Tides (Arthur J. Ashton, 1929) and Waves (Gary Miller, 2019).

== Plot summary ==
Doralice, Countess of Köhne-Jasky, has walked out on her much older husband and run off with Hans Grill, a young artist who had been commissioned by the Count to paint his wife's picture. Now, a year later, Hans and Doralice have come to the Baltic coast to spend a solitary summer's holiday in a fisherman's hut. They are said to have got married in London so their relationship is outwardly considered "correct" although their marriage is generally seen as a misalliance, especially by the society Doralice has left behind. While she herself is rather unsure about her future, Hans Grill is an optimistic free spirit, though not quite a libertine, who is full of plans in which Doralice figures prominently. He dreams of setting himself up as a successful painter in Munich — thus being eventually able to stop living off his wife's money – and of living with her in a small suburban house.

Rather than shunning the unlikely couple, the other tourists at the small fishing village feel morally obliged to associate with them, at least perfunctorily. They are the extended Buttlär family: Baron von Buttlär; his wife Bella; their three children Lolo, Nini, and Wedig; and Baron von Buttlär's mother-in-law, the Generalin von Palikow. They are soon to be joined by Hilmar Baron von dem Hamm, Lolo's dashing fiancé, who is an officer in the German army. Also present is the Geheimrat von Knospelius, a high-ranking civil servant. Burdened with a physical handicap, and never having married, Knospelius is used to leading a vicarious life through the people he surrounds himself with, and as soon as they have arrived he introduces himself to both the Buttlärs and the Grills.

The presence of a scandalous couple does not go unnoticed by the Buttlär children. Rather, it is one of their games to sneak out of the house at night together with Ernestine, one of the young servants, to catch a glimpse of Doralice through the open window of the Grimms' rented hut. One day, while swimming in the sea, Lolo meets Doralice on a sandbank and is deeply impressed by her cheerful manner, her wit, and her beauty, so much so that she decides to send her a huge bunch of red roses, while instinctively choosing her as her role model.

Others who are also impressed by Doralice's beauty include Baron von Buttlär, a known womaniser, who is now jealously guarded by his wife, and Hilmar von dem Hamm, who openly starts courting Doralice despite her husband's and his own fiancée's presence. His endeavours to win Doralice's heart culminate in a boating trip that he undertakes with her while the others stay behind. Doralice feels flattered by the attentions of a member of the very social class that has ostracised her. At the same time, she realizes her indebtedness to, and possibly love for, Hans and stops all further advances on Hilmar's part. Lolo on the other hand, aware of her fiancé's infatuation, but due to an over-protective upbringing unprepared for life's harsh realities, decides to sacrifice herself by committing suicide. At night she secretly leaves the house wearing only her bathing suit under her coat, walks down to the beach and starts swimming out into the sea, far beyond the sandbank where she met Doralice. She is rescued by local fishermen who drag her half-conscious body into their boat and return her to her family.

Although Lolo makes a quick and full recovery, etiquette demands of the Buttlärs that they depart immediately. Those who stay behind into the autumn are Hans and Doralice Grimm and Geheimrat Knospelius – the latter because, unbeknown to everyone, he has handed in his resignation and now has all the time in the world, and the Grimms because they actually have no other place to go. In the course of the summer, Hans has become more and more monosyllabic, and Doralice longs for some serious talk concerning their future together: She realizes that she desperately needs Hans's reassurance of his love for her. Hans, however, keeps postponing that talk to the following day and indulges in his growing fascination with the sea. Not only does he paint it; he now accompanies the fishermen on their nightly routine on a more or less regular basis and then sleeps during most of the day.

One night he goes out fishing with Steege, a notorious drunkard whose vice has prevented him from buying a new fishing boat. The old dilapidated one cannot defy the thunderstorm of which they have been warned, and the sea claims two more lives: After long days of waiting, Doralice and Mrs Steege finally accept the fact that their husbands are not coming back. At this point Knospelius makes Doralice the unexpected offer to be his companion for the foreseeable future and to spend the winter with him touring the Greek islands.

== Rediscovery ==
Literary critic Jens Malte Fischer called Keyserling "possibly the most unknown of the great German story-tellers of the century." Wellen was selected as one of 100 great novels of the 20th century by the Süddeutsche Zeitung and reprinted in a special edition in 2004.

== Film adaptation ==
In 2005 Vivian Naefe adapted Keyserling's novel for television. Based on a screenplay by Günter Schütter, the film Waves starred Sunnyi Melles, Matthias Habich and Marie Bäumer.

Various changes to the plot of the novel were made. For example, in the film, the action is set on the eve of the First World War in order to stress the imminence of death of an aristocratic society and its antiquated social mores and conventions. Also, for whatever reason, Knospelius was renamed Froselius, while the artist's name is given as Til Knop. Hilmar von dem Hamm becomes Carl von Gonthard.
