= Lidija Doroņina-Lasmane =

Latvian dissident

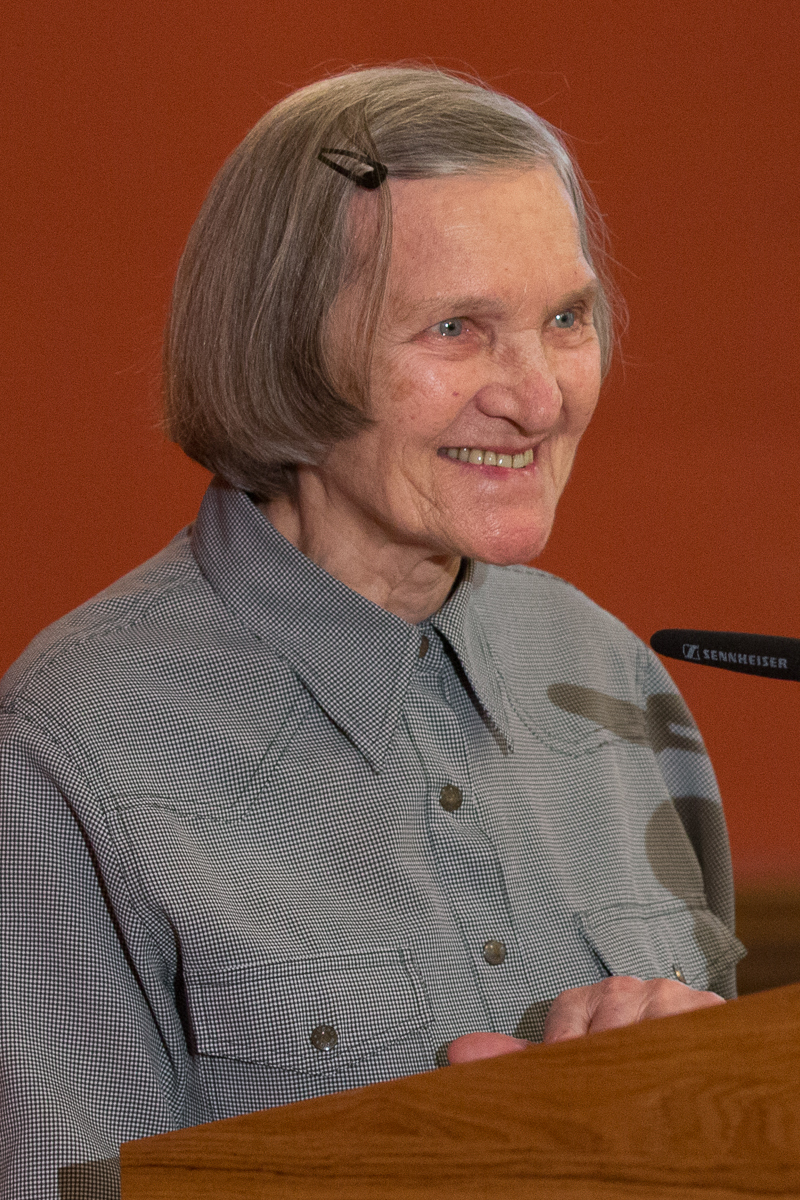
- Doroņina-Lasmane in 2015
- Born: July 28, 1925 (age 100); Aizpute Municipality, Latvia
- Known for: Soviet dissidence

Lidija Doroņina-Lasmane (born Lidija Lasmane, July 28, 1925) is a Latvian dissident, a member of anti-Soviet resistance during the occupation of Latvia and a candidate for 2018 Nobel Peace Prize.

== Biography ==
Born on July 28, 1925, in the Ulmale Parish of the Aizpute District in a Baptist family, she was baptized at the age of 13 at a Baptist congregation in Saka. After World War II, Lasmane began to study nursing in Riga. She and members of her family were arrested for the first time for delivering medications and bandage materials to Latvian partisans. In April 1947, the War Tribunal of the Soviet Latvian Interior Ministry Armed Forces sentenced Lidija Lasmane to five years in a labor camp, with limitation of her rights to last for three years afterward. Her father, Andrejs Lasmanis, was sentenced to 10 years, while her mother received a suspended sentence of three years. While at a labor camp called Vosturallag in the eastern Ural Mountains, Lidija came down with a case of tuberculosis. In 1951, she was sent to Vorkuta, where she met her future husband, Mikhail Doronin. After Stalin's death, Lidija Lasmane was allowed to return to Latvia, where she lived with her cousin, Edvards Lasmanis, in the Mežaparks neighborhood.

In 1970, she was arrested again for reading illegal literature and distributing handwritten copies of same. The Soviet Latvian Supreme Court sentenced Doronina-Lasmane to two years in prison for "the distribution of purposefully untrue imaginations which discredit the Soviet state and its social order." She served this sentence at the Dzegužkalns women's prison in the Iļģuciems neighborhood of Riga.

She was arrested for a third time during the repressions of the era of Yuri Andropov on January 6, 1983, along with Jānis Rožkalns, Gunārs Astra and Jānis Vēvers, accused of "anti-Soviet propaganda and campaigning." The Soviet Latvian Supreme Court sentenced her in August 1983 to five years at a labor camp in Mordovia and then to three years in a settlement outside of Latvia. During the perestroika age of Mikhail Gorbachev, Doroņina-Lasmane was freed on January 14, 1987, and was sent to a camp in the Altay region of Siberia for several months.

During the summer of 1987, Doroņina-Lasmane returned to Latvia. After the restoration of the independence of the Republic of Latvia, she restored her maiden name, Lasmane, and became an active employee of the Center to Document the Consequences of Totalitarianism. In 1994, Doroņina-Lasmane received the Order of Three Stars, Fifth Grade, but she refused to accept it because, she said, several KGB agents would be presented with the order together with her. She received the Award of the Cabinet of Ministers of Latvia in 2019.
