= Katharine Hopkins Chapman =

American writer and historian (died 1930)

- Born: Katharine Glass Hopkins; March 4, 1870/1872/1873; Selma, Alabama, U.S.
- Died: May 21, 1930; Selma, Alabama
- Resting place: Old Live Oak Cemetery
- Education: Shorter College
- Occupations: writer; historian
- Spouse: John Thomas Chapman (m. 1891)
- Children: 2
- Writing career
- Pen name: Katharine Hope
- Notable work: The Fusing Force

Katharine Hopkins Chapman (née, Hopkins; pen name, Katharine Hope; March 4, 1870/72/73 - May 21, 1930) was an author and historian of the American South. Born in Selma, transplanted to the booming time of Anniston in its infancy, grafted by marriage into the crude conditions of Bessemer's early days, a frequent visitor to Mobile and Montgomery, Chapman was well equipped to delineate Alabama characters and scenes, and in her stories she depicted life among the well-to-do American Southern people, her first writings being signed "Katharine Hope" in deference for her father's scruples against a woman's name appearing in print except at her marriage or death. By 1921, she had published 89 short stories in leading magazines. A short memoir appeared in The Editor in 1913.

== Early life and education ==
Katharine (nickname, "Katie") Glass Hopkins was born March 4, 1870, or 1872, 1873, in Selma, Dallas County, Alabama. Her parents were Thomas Holmes and Mary Elizabeth (Glass) Hopkins, the former a native of Danville, Virginia, and later a resident of Anniston, having taken an active interest in that city's progress since its inception in 1880. In 1859, he removed to Uniontown, Alabama and enlisted as a private in the Canebrake Rifle Guard, Company D. Fourth Alabama regiment, serving until General Robert E. Lee's surrender. He was a son of Reuben and Julia Augusta (Holmes) Hopkins, of Danville, Virginia, where Reuben Hopkins engaged in the banking business and also owned an extensive tobacco plantation nearby. His second wife, Julia A. Holmes, was a school teacher from New England, a representative of the same family as Oliver Wendell Holmes. Her abolition principles made slaveholding unpleasant for the family and eventually Reuben Hopkins sacrificed his tobacco lands and slaves and moved west, being tendered a public banquet and silver service on his departure. He settled in Iowa in 1857 and purchased land where Dubuque now stands but died suddenly before his titles were validated. Chapman's maternal grandparents were Benjamin Alexander and Catharine (Morrison) Glass, who owned and occupied a plantation 6 miles (9.7 km) from Selma, near the Valley Creek Presbyterian church, both belonging to North Carolina families who came to Alabama territory about 1816. The colony were Scotch Presbyterians and erected the first brick church in this state. Mr. Glass gave the land on which it is located and contributed liberally to its erection. He was a ruling elder of the church, a planter and philanthropist. The Alexanders, Morrisons and Hopkinses were all descended from signers of the Declaration of Independence and also the Mecklenburg Declaration.

Chapman began her education at home under private teachers, one being Mrs. Moore, who afterward wrote under the name of "Betsey Hamilton"; another Mrs. K. M. Jarvis, librarian of Selma Carnegie library. She was graduated from Shorter College, Rome, Georgia, 1887, (Note: According to Leonard (1914), Chapman graduated from Shorter College in 1889.) taking honors in English and Latin, and her essay on "The desirability of an international copyright", was widely copied and praised. She also completed the Chautauqua literary and scientific course and was graduated at Chautauqua, New York, in 1904.

== Career ==
Chapman began writing stories and sketches as soon as she was graduated from college. Her first work, "Letters on Life in the South" was accepted by the Philadelphia Times in August, 1888, calling forth a personal letter of encouragement from A. K. McClure. This was followed by "Chautauqua Chats". Short stories included "Naughty Puritan Plym", "Mammy's Buckeyed Baby", "Love's Way in Dixie", "The Alabama Girl", "Milton's Mistletoe", and many others. After her marriage to Dr. J. T. Chapman, she ceased writing, and only later took it up again. Several character sketches depicting life encountered by Southern housekeepers during the transition period of the African American servant were syndicated in Sunday papers, and also appeared in the Birmingham Advance, a magazine of the New South.

She served as president for Alabama of the National League of American Pen Women, and also president of the Alabama Writers' Conclave. She attended the 1926 Biennial of the Pen Women in Washington, D.C.

== Personal life ==
On October 8, 1891, at Shelby, Alabama, she married Dr. John Thomas Chapman (1863-1932), son of Samuel Edward and Betty (Edwards) Chapman, of McKinley, Alabama, the former a lieutenant in the Confederate States Army in 1863 and 1864, when he was elected sheriff of Marengo County, Alabama. The couple had a son, Thomas Holmes Chapman (born 1894), and a daughter, Catharine Lee Chapman (born 1909).

She was a communicant of the Episcopal church; a trustee of Selma Carnegie library; and a member of the Chautauqua Circle of Selma, which she has represented as a delegate to the Alabama Woman's Federation several times. An active clubwoman, she was a founder of the Selma Pilot Club.

Chapman made her home in Selma, Alabama, where her family retained the land settled by her great-grandfather in the days when sturdy planters moved inland from the Atlantic seaboard.

Katharine Hopkins Chapman died May 21, 1930, in Selma, Alabama. Burial was at that city's Old Live Oak Cemetery.

== Selected works ==
=== Short stories ===
- "Naughty Puritan Plym", Delineator
- "Mammy's Buckeyed Baby"
- "Love's Way in Dixie"
- "The Alabama Girl"
- "Milton's Mistletoe"
- "The Dance of Fear"

=== Articles ===
- "Cherry-Stone Fiction", The Free-lance Writer's Handbook, 1926
- "Sara Haardt", The Bookman, 1926
- "Lectures and Talks on Writing Technique: Illustrated by Original Readings Offered to Colleges, Chautauquas, Writers' and Literary Clubs", 1926 (text)

=== Plays ===
- Christmas Topsey-turkey: A Comedy in One Act, 1924 (text)
- A Quilt for a Battleship: A One-act Confederate Play, 1925 (text)

=== Books ===
- Love's way in Dixie : some short stories from Cupid's favorite field, 1905 (text)
- Sketch of Dr. La Fayette Guild, medical director and chief surgeon of the Army of Northern Virginia, 1909 (text)
- The Fusing Force: An Idaho Idyl, 1911 (text)
- The Moulting Sea-gull, 1920 (text)
- Brown Girls Or Green?: Christmas Topsey-turkey, Also a Queer Distinction, 1923 (text)
