= Kayserling =

Kayserling is a German surname, which means "emperor's follower" or "little emperor", from the terms kayser (meaning kaiser or emperor) and the diminutive suffix -ling, meaning a smaller version of or a follower. Related names include Kaysersberg and Keyserling. The surname may refer to:

- Meyer Kayserling (1829–1905), German historian
- Simon Kayserling (1834–1898), German educator

== See also ==
- Keyserling
