= The Fusing Force =

Novel by Katharine Hopkins Chapman

The Fusing Force: An Idaho Idyl was the debut novel of Katharine Hopkins Chapman. Illustrated by W. Herbert Dunton, it was published in Chicago in 1911 by A. C. McClurg & Company. It is a story of love, courtship and marriage in the American frontier, wish a bishop, professor, and miners as the principal characters.

== Background ==
The mines and the people of this story are sufficiently connected with its events to provide background for a love story. The scenes of the matrimonial adventures of both hero and heroine are laid in Idaho and the picture of life in mining camps with the Haywood-Pettibone-Moyer trial as a background makes a setting which the writer used to advantage. A western professor of sociology, a group of charming southern people, and a villain or two supply the material for keeping the plot moving briskly. The book ends with a satisfactory solution of all the mysteries involved.

== Development ==
This is Chapman's first long novel; she is known through her short stories in various magazines.
