= Eduard von Keyserling =

German writer

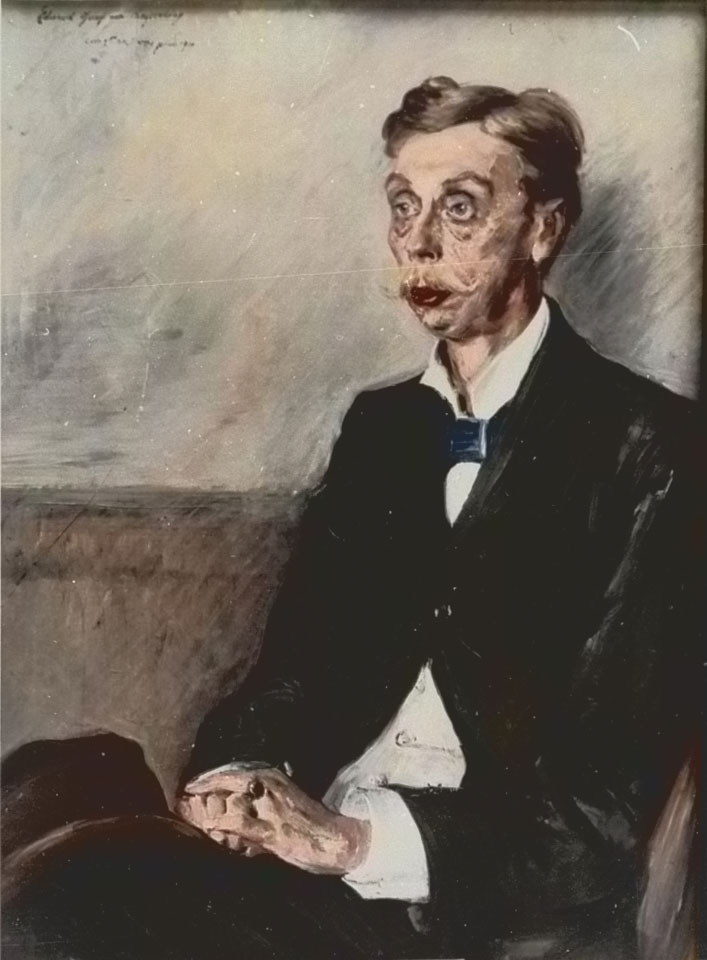
Count Eduard von Keyserling, 1900 (Painting of Lovis Corinth, Munich, Neue Pinakothek)

Johann Heinrich Eduard Nicolaus Graf von Keyserling (May 14, 1855 – September 28, 1918) was a Baltic German fiction writer and dramatist, an exponent of literary impressionism and associated with the historic region of Courland.

== Biography ==
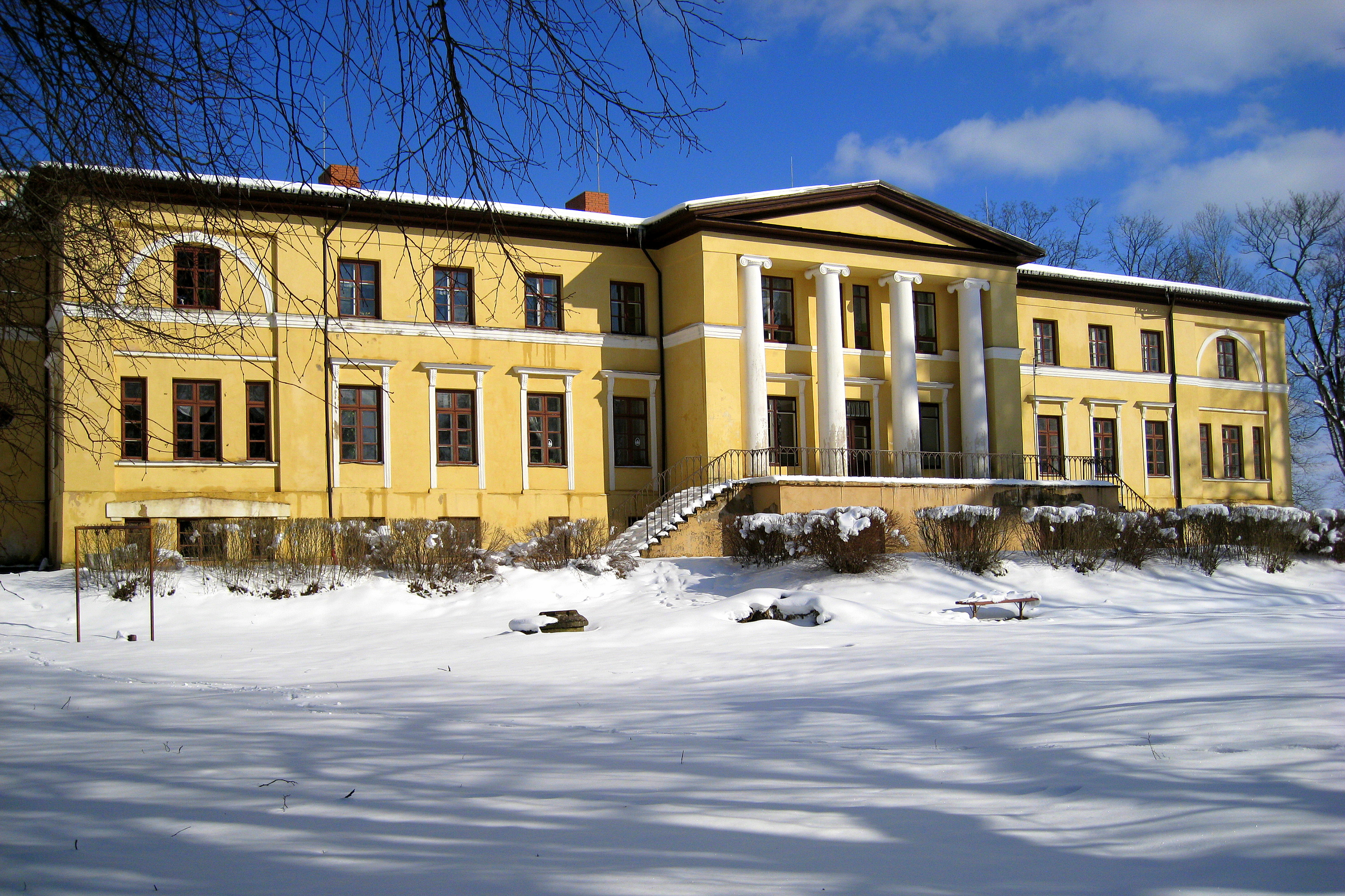
Tels-Paddern Manor where Keyserling was born and where he grew up

Keyserling was born at Schloss Tels-Paddern (now in Kalvene parish, South Kurzeme Municipality, Latvia), Courland Governorate, then part of the Russian Empire. He belonged to the Baltic German family of Keyserlingk and was a nephew of the geologist Alexander Keyserling. He died in Munich, Bavaria.

Keyserling's early novels Fräulein Rosa Herz. Eine Kleinstadtliebe (1887) and Die dritte Stiege (1892) were influenced by Naturalism. The later novels are more finely nuanced and less interested in assembling details. He is always interested in the interplay of light and natural objects. His novels and novellas are usually set in the German Baltic provinces, both in the noble houses and gardens and also in the fir forests and the outdoors generally. Most of his novels are suffused with a certain melancholy. They are peopled by minor aristocrats. Sometimes there are contrasting figures from a less exalted class; often this is a "child of nature," a person uncorrupted by civilization. Frequently there is a clash of generations. His novellas and novels, after 1902, place Keyserling at the forefront of German literary Impressionism. His essays on general and cultural questions, like his theater plays, are forgotten.

Keyserling enjoyed a literary reputation both in Germany and in the United States. His novels, translated into English in the late 1920s, were reviewed by literary critics, particularly in newspapers of record. His works were edited and anthologized for use in language pedagogy, perhaps as much for their accessible style as for their appealing story lines. His language is unusually chaste and concise. Sentences are never very long or complex.

A subtle and elegant stylist, Keyserling's narrative is unforgettable for its evocative ambience and "feel." His most emblematic work is perhaps Fürstinnen (Princesses), only superficially related to the typical German 19th century Schlossroman (the novel set in a castle or manor house). Somehow midway between Ivan Turgenev and Franz Kafka, there is a certain pessimistic kinship between Keyserling and Anton Chekhov.

== Works ==
- Fräulein Rosa Herz. Eine Kleinstadtliebe (1887)
- Die dritte Stiege (1892)
- Die schwarze Flasche (1902)
- Beate und Mareile. Eine Schloßgeschichte (1903)
- Schwüle Tage (1904)
- Seine Liebeserfahrung (1906)
- Dumala (1908)
- Bunte Herzen (1909)
- Wellen (1911)
- Abendliche Häuser (1914)
- Im stillen Winkel (1914)
- Nicky (1914)
- Am Südhang (1914/16)
- Fürstinnen (1917)
- Feierstagskinder (1918)
- Gesammelte Erzählungen, ed. E. Heilborn, 4 Bde., Frankfurt a.M.1971–1973

Works Translated into English

- Gay Hearts: 1909. (= Bunte Herzen). Translated by Bayard Quincy Morgan. German Classics of the 19th and 20th Centuries, v. 19. New York: The German Publication Society, 1914.
- Twilight. (= Abendliche Häuser, Harmonie, and Kersta.) Translated respectively by James Ashton, Amy Wesselhoeft Von Erdberg, and A. W. Von Erdberg and E. Drew Arundel. New York: Macaulay, 1927.
- The Curse of the Tarniffs. (= Beate und Mareile). Translated by Arthur Jacob Ashton. New York: Macaulay, 1928.
- Tides. (= Wellen) Translated by Arthur Jacob Ashton. New York: Macaulay, 1929.
- The Man of God. (= Dumala) New York: Macaulay, 1930.
- "Princesses" (=Fürstinnen). Translated by John B. Rutledge.
- "Holiday Children" (= Feiertagskinder). Translated by John B. Rutledge.
- "Number 2, Margaretenstrasse" (= Die Dritte Stiege). Translated by John B. Rutledge.
- "In a Quiet Corner" (= Im stillen Winkel) Translated by John B. Rutledge.
- "Sultry Days" (= Schwüle Tage) Translated by Tony Malone (2018)
- Waves. (= Wellen) Translated by Gary Miller. Cambridge: Dedalus Ltd., 2019.
- "Experiences of Love" (= Seine Liebeserfahrung) Translated by Tony Malone (2019)
- "Neighbours" (= Nachbarn) Translated by Tony Malone (2020)
- On Southern Slopes (= Am Südhang) Translated by Tony Malone (2023)
