= Kalvene Parish =

Parish of Latvia

- parish of Latvia
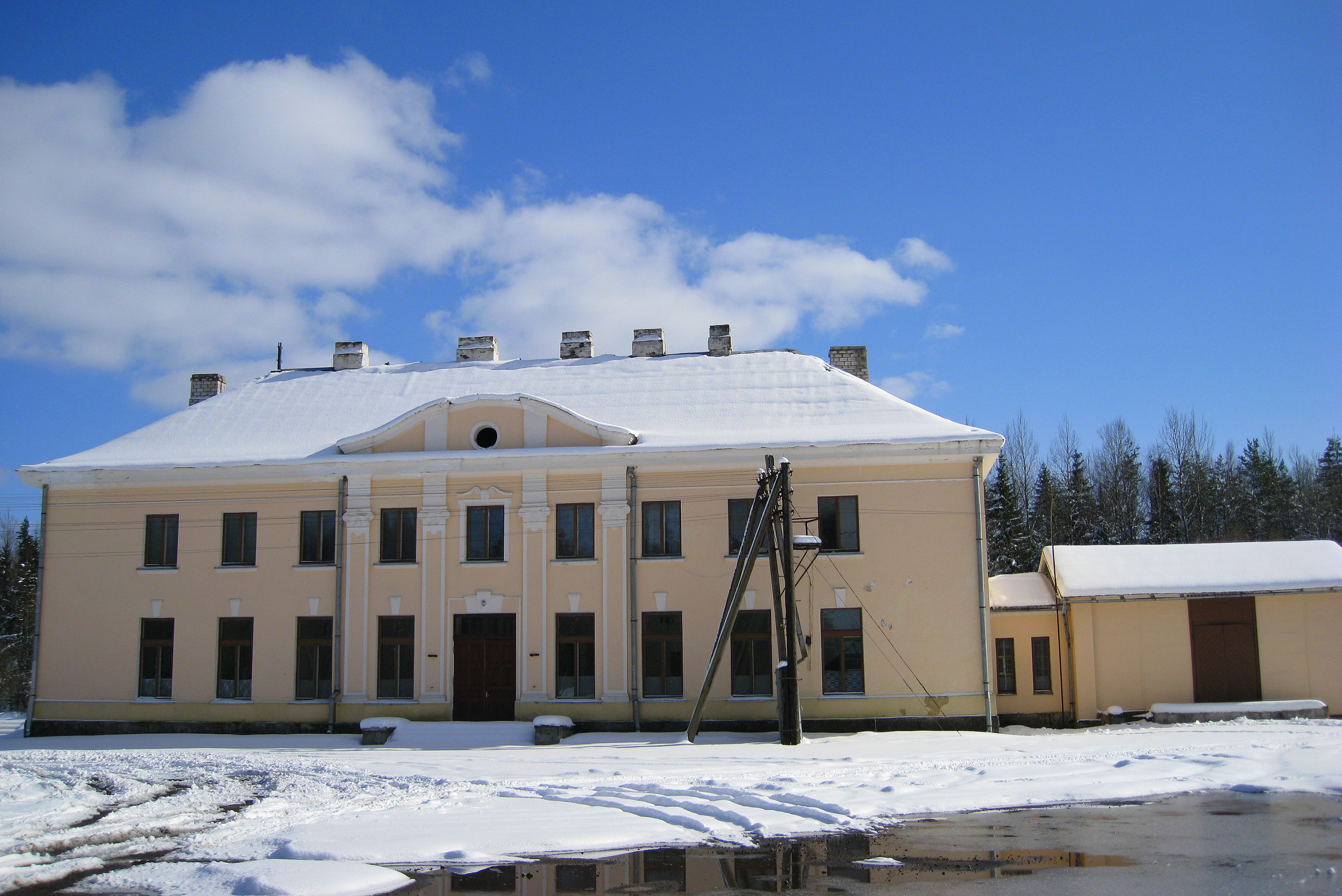

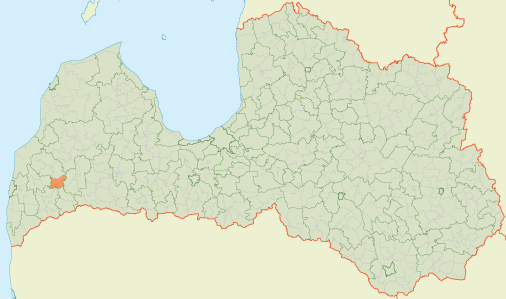
- 56°36′28″N 21°42′27″E
- Country: Latvia

Area
  - Total: 118.73 km^{2} (45.84 sq mi)
  - Land: 112.55 km^{2} (43.46 sq mi)
  - Water: 6.18 km^{2} (2.39 sq mi)

Population (1 January 2026)
  - Total: 554
  - Density: 4.92/km^{2} (12.7/sq mi)

Kalvene Parish (Latvian: Kalvenes pagasts) is an administrative unit of South Kurzeme Municipality, Latvia. The parish has a population of 803 (as of 1/07/2010) and covers an area of 118.9 km^{2}.

== History ==
On the territory of present Kalvene parish there were historically Kalwen manor, Krussat-Drogen manor, Groß-Drogen manor, Tels-Paddern manor house, Perbohn manor.

In 1935, the area of Kalvene parish (till 1925, Tashu-Padure parish) was 134 km^{2}. In 1945 the village councils of Kalvene, Boja and Lieldrog were established, but in 1949 the villages were dissolved. In 1954 the village of Lieldrog was added to Kalvene village, in 1958 the territory of Kazdanga village collective farm "Tebra", in 1968 part of Vecpils and Krote village collective farm "Friendship". In 1990 the village was reorganized into a parish. In 2009, Kalvene rural municipality was included in Aizpute municipality as an administrative territory.

== Villages of Kalvene parish ==
- Kalvene (Tāšu Padure)
- Kalvenes stacija
- Krusāta
- Pērbone
- Rudbāržu stacija
