= Keyserlingk family =

German noble family

Keyserlingk
- Noble family
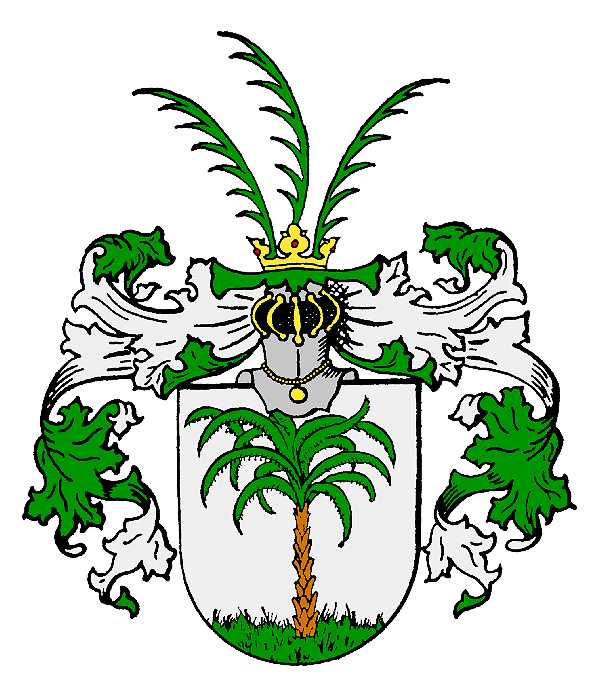
- The Keyserlingk coat of arms
- Current region: Northern Europe (Baltic countries)
- Origin: Germany

The House of Keyserlingk (Keyserling) is an old and influential German noble family from Westphalia, whose members held significant positions in Prussia, Saxony, the Baltic and Russia.

== History ==
It was first mentioned with Hermann Keselinch on 16 November 1300. The direct line began with Albert Keserlink (mentioned 1443–1467), mayor at Herford. In 1492 his son Hermann von Keyserlingk fought in Livland for the Teutonic Order. For this Wolter von Plettenberg gave him fiefs in Courland. In Prussia, the Russian Empire and the Electorate of Saxony his descendants worked for the state and in the 18th century four of them gained the title of Graf. From this 4 Graf-lines 2 still exist. It was Count Carl Keyserlingk who was responsible for inviting Rudolf Steiner to his estate in Koberwitz (Kobierzyce) in 1924 to present the Agriculture Course which led to the founding of the biodynamic agriculture. There is also a Freiherr-line. There are a number of interesting articles on Keyserling(k) as well as an extensive bibliography on the family website.

Count Hermann Carl von Keyserlingk (1696–1764), a Russian ambassador to Saxony, helped Johann Sebastian Bach get the title court composer to the King of Poland and the Elector of Saxony, received from Elector Frederick Augustus II in 1736.

After 1945 all property in the Baltics and East Prussia had to be abandoned. Since then around 1700 descendants have scattered all over the world, mainly in Germany, the United States, Canada and Australia.

== Sources ==
- "Кейзерлинг, род" . Brockhaus and Efron Encyclopedic Dictionary (in Russian). 1906.
