= Landsmanschaft =

Landsmanschaft could refer to:

- Landsmanshaft, a type of Jewish mutual-aid organisation
- Landsmannschaft (Studentenverbindung), a German students' fraternity
- Organizations of German refugees from former eastern territories
  - Landsmannschaft Schlesien
  - Landsmannschaft Ostpreußen
  - Landsmannschaft Westpreußen
  - Landsmannschaft Weichsel-Warthe Bundesverband
  - Landsmannschaft der Banater Schwaben
  - Landsmannschaft der Bessarabiendeutschen
  - Landsmannschaft der Buchenlanddeutschen
  - Landsmannschaft der Deutschen aus Russland
  - Landsmannschaft der Deutschen aus Ungarn
  - Landsmannschaft der Siebenbürger Sachsen in Deutschland
  - Landsmannschaft der Deutschen aus Litauen
  - Karpatendeutsche Landsmannschaft Slowakei
  - Pommersche Landsmannschaft
  - Sudetendeutsche Landsmannschaft
  - Deutsch-Baltische Gesellschaft

== See also ==
- All-German Bloc/League of Expellees and Deprived of Rights
- Federation of Expellees
- Organised persecution of ethnic Germans
- German eastward settlement
- Nazi–Soviet population transfers
- History of Poland
- History of Pomerania
- History of Silesia
- History of Prussia
- History of the Czech lands
- Ethnic cleansing
