= Georg von Manteuffel-Szoege =

German politician

Georg Baron von Manteuffel-Szoege (7 March 1889 – 8 June 1962) was a German politician.

== Life and career ==
Manteuffel-Szoege was born in Montreux (Switzerland) to Georg von Manteuffel (1862–1919) and Sophie née von Rüdiger (1866–1949). His Baltic-German family owned estates in a size of about 20,000 ha in the Baltic provinces of Russia including the manor of Katzdangen (Kazdanga, Latvia). His father was killed by Latvian Riflemen in 1919.

He visited school in Riga and studied national economics, History and Philosophy at the Universities of Halle and Heidelberg in 1909–1913. He passed his doctorate in 1913 and worked at the Kurländische Kreditverein (Mitau) in 1914/15, as a Secretary at the delegation of the Kurländische Ritterschaft in Berlin and for a Cooperative in Posen (Poznan). In 1918 he volunteered the Baltische Landeswehr and was a member of the Baltic National Committee of the United Baltic Duchy.

In 1921-1939 Manteuffel worked at his maternal family estate of Zabłudów near Białystok and was a member of the executive board of the Baltische Arbeitsgemeinschaft (Baltic Committee) in Berlin in 1925–39. In 1935-1939 he was a teacher for East European History and Economy at the Auslandshochschule (Foreign College) Berlin. After a short time in the German Foreign Office in 1940–42, he returned to Zabłudów until 1945.

After World War II he was expelled from Poland and started to work as a peasant in Niederbayern. In 1950 he became the President of the Hauptamt für Soforthilfe (Main Office for immediate aid) and chairman of the Deutsch-Baltische Gesellschaft. In 1953 he was elected a member of the Bundestag, representing the Bavarian CSU, a position he held until his death, and became the head of the Association of Refugee Organisations (Verband der Landsmannschaften) in 1954. In 1957-59 he was next to Linus Kather the equal-ranking head of the Federation of Expellees.

Manteuffel-Szoege was married to Maria née von Bonin (1918–26), Dorothea née von Behr-Ubja (1933–54) and Gretlies née von Schilling (1954–62). He died in Bad Godesberg.

== Awards ==
- Federal Great Cross of Merit with star (1959)

== Publications ==
- Geschichte des polnischen Volkes während seiner Unfreiheit 1742-1914, Berlin, Duncker&Humblot, 1950.
