= List of newspapers in Germany =

The number of national daily newspapers in Germany was 598 in 1950, whereas it was 375 in 1965. Below is a list of newspapers in Germany, sorted according to printed run as of 2015, as listed at which tracks circulations of all publications in Germany.

== National ==
=== Daily national subscription papers ===
| No. | Newspaper | Abbrv. | Circulation (Jan 2018) | Days of publication | Political alignment | Publisher/Parent Company |
|---|---|---|---|---|---|---|
| 1 | Bild | Bild | 1,150,181 | Mon–Sat | Centre-right Populist | Axel Springer AG (Axel Springer Gesellschaft für Publizistik GmbH & Co. (Friede Springer)) |
| 2 | Süddeutsche Zeitung | SZ | 361,507 | Mon–Sat | Centre-left/ left-liberal or "critical-liberal" | Südwestdeutsche Medien Holding (Gruppe Württembergischer Verleger (Neue Pressegesellschaft mbh & Co. KG (Eberhard Ebner))), Medien Union (Dieter Schaub) |
| 3 | Frankfurter Allgemeine Zeitung | FAZ | 254,263 | Mon–Fri | Centre-right/ moderately conservative to liberal | Fazit-Stiftung |
| 4 | Die Welt | | 165,686 | Mon–Fri | Centre-right/ conservative to liberal | Axel Springer AG (Axel Springer Gesellschaft für Publizistik GmbH & Co. (Friede Springer)) |
| 5 | Handelsblatt | | 130,864 | Mon–Fri | Economically liberal | Georg von Holtzbrinck Publishing Group (Monika Schoeller, Stefan von Holtzbrinck) |
| 6 | Der Tagesspiegel | | 113,716 | Mon–Sun | Liberal, centrist | Georg von Holtzbrinck Publishing Group (Monika Schoeller, Stefan von Holtzbrinck) |
| 7 | Die Tageszeitung | taz | 51,873 | Mon–Sat | Left-wing, green | taz, die tageszeitung Verlagsgenossenschaft eG |
| 8 | Neues Deutschland | ND | 25,158 | Mon–Sat | Left-wing, socialist | Neues Deutschland Druckerei und Verlags GmbH and The Left Party |
| 9 | Junge Welt | jW | c. 19,000 | Mon–Sat | Far-left, Marxist | Verlag 8. Mai |
| 10 | Westfalen-Blatt | | | | | |

=== Weekly national subscription papers ===
| No. | Newspaper | Abbrv. | Circulation | | Political alignment | Publisher/Parent Company |
| No. | Newspaper | Abbrv. | 4/2015 | Change | Political alignment | Publisher/Parent Company |
|---|---|---|---|---|---|---|
| 1 | Die Zeit | | 511,806 | ▲0.2% | / center-leftSocial democracy SPD endorsement | Georg von Holtzbrinck Publishing Group (Monika Schoeller, Stefan von Holtzbrinck) |
| 2 | Junge Freiheit | JF | 25,868 | ▲16.5% | Right-wing, conservative | Junge Freiheit Verlag GmbH & Co (Dieter Stein) |
| 3 | Der Freitag | | 19,708 | | Left-wing, left-liberal | Jakob Augstein |
| 4 | Preußische Allgemeine Zeitung | PAZ | 18,000 | | Right-wing, "Prussian conservative" | Landsmannschaft Ostpreußen |
| 5 | Jungle World | JW | c. 11,585 | | Far-left, undogmatic | Jungle World Verlags GmbH |

=== News magazines ===
- Der Spiegel (weekly (Saturday) left-liberal — 830,349 copies)
- Stern (weekly (Thursday) left-liberal — 734,859 copies)
- Focus (weekly (Saturday) liberal-conservative — 500,480 copies)
- Wirtschaftswoche (weekly (Friday) economically-liberal — 131,229 copies)
- Cicero (monthly liberal-conservative — 83,718 copies)
- konkret (monthly far-left — 42,398 copies)

== Regional ==
Here are 20 large newspapers in the regions of Germany.

- Berliner Zeitung lit. 'Berlin Newspaper'
- Berliner Morgenpost lit. 'Berlin morning paper'
- Hamburger Abendblatt lit. 'Hamburg evening paper'
- Kieler Nachrichten
- Neue Osnabrücker Zeitung
- Hannoversche Allgemeine Zeitung
- Braunschweiger Zeitung
- Westdeutsche Allgemeine Zeitung
- Kölner Stadt-Anzeiger
- Rheinische Post
- Westfälische Nachrichten
- Aachener Zeitung
- Saarbrücker Zeitung
- Main-Post
- Nürnberger Nachrichten
- Augsburger Allgemeine
- Stuttgarter Zeitung
- Stuttgarter Nachrichten
- Badische Zeitung
- Leipziger Volkszeitung
- Freie Presse (Sachsen)

== Boulevard papers ("tabloid" style) ==
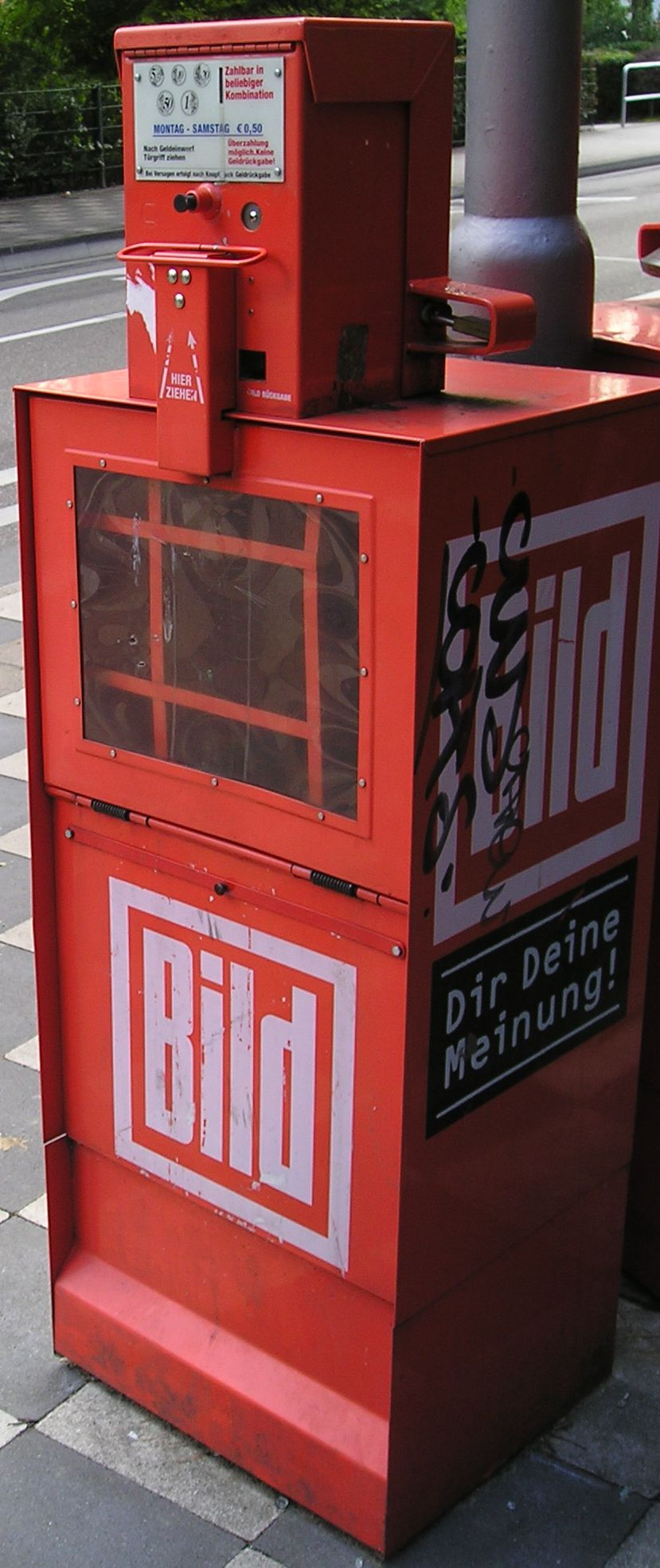
A Bild kiosk

Boulevardzeitungen (sometimes translated as "popular papers") is a style of newspapers, characterised by big, colourful headlines, pictures and sensationalist stories, comparable to the English term "red top" or "tabloid", but independent from the paper format (the most widespread boulevard paper actually has a Broadsheet format). Also called Kaufzeitungen or Straßenverkaufszeitungen ("street sale papers"), as they can only be bought day by day at kiosks or from street vendors and are not usually delivered to subscribers (Munich's Abendzeitung being a notable exception).

=== National boulevard papers ===
- Bild (2,086,125 copies)

also called "Bildzeitung"; with several regional editions like Bild Hamburg or Bild Köln. The Bild can be compared to tabloids, but the page size is bigger (broadsheet).

Bild has a Sunday sister newspaper (which is a tabloid both in terms of style and paper format), Bild am Sonntag (1,118,497 copies), edited by a separate desk.

=== Regional or local boulevard papers ===
- Express in Cologne and the Rhineland (132,836 copies)
- tz (Munich) (120,533)
- B.Z. (Berlin) (116,848 copies)
- Berliner Kurier (96,352 copies)
- Hamburger Morgenpost (83,096 copies)
- Abendzeitung (51,310 copies, unlike other Boulevard papers, about half of the copies are delivered to subscribers)

== Non-German-language ==
| Title | Language | City of publication |
|---|---|---|
| Flensborg Avis | Danish | Flensburg |
| Handelsblatt Global Edition | English | Düsseldorf |
| Hürriyet | Turkish | Mörfelden-Walldorf |
| The Munich Eye | English | Munich |
| Serbske Nowiny | Sorbian | Bautzen, Saxony |
| Stars and Stripes | English | Griesheim |
| Vesti | Serbian | Frankfurt am Main |
| Yeni Özgür Politika | Kurdish | Neu-Isenburg |
| BerlinObserver | English | |
| PPC Land | English | Frankfurt am Main |

== See also ==
- History of newspapers and magazines#Germany
- Media of Germany
- List of German magazines
- Informationsgemeinschaft zur Feststellung der Verbreitung von Werbeträgern
- Full list of modern German newspapers (in German)
- Full list of antiquarian German newspapers (in German)
- List of newspapers (by country)
