= Hans Krüger =

Nazi and West German politician (1902–1971)

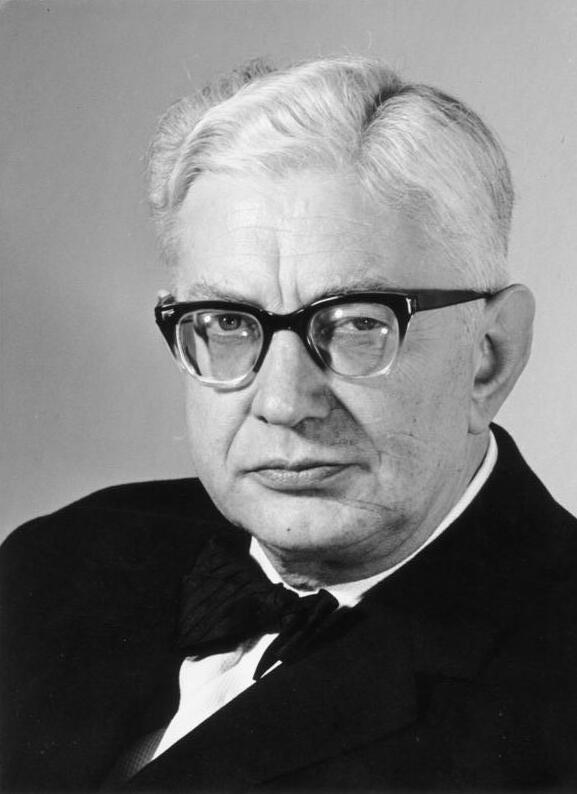

Federal Minister for Displaced Persons, Refugees and War Victims Germany
- In office 17 October 1963 – 7 February 1964
- Preceded by: Wolfgang Mischnick
- Succeeded by: Ernst Lemmer

President of the Federation of Expellees
- In office 1959–1964
- Preceded by: Georg Baron Manteuffel-Szoege and Linus Kather
- Succeeded by: Wenzel Jaksch

Member of the Bundestag
- In office 1957–1965

Personal details
- Born: 6 July 1902
- Died: 3 November 1971 (aged 69)
- Party: National Socialist German Workers Party (NSDAP); Christian Democratic Union (CDU)

Hans Krüger (6 July 1902 – 3 November 1971) was a former member of the NSDAP party and other Nazi organizations who served as an SS judge in occupied Poland during the Second World War. After the war he became West German politician of the Christian Democratic Union (CDU). He served as Federal Minister for Displaced Persons, Refugees and War Victims of the Federal Republic of Germany from 17 October 1963 to 7 February 1964, in the First Cabinet of Chancellor Ludwig Erhard, as President of the Federation of Expellees from 1959 to 1964, and as a Member of Parliament from 1957 to 1965. He stepped down from cabinet amid controversy about his war-time background.

== Life ==
Krüger was born in Neustettin (Szczecinek) in the Province of Pomerania. He completed studies of political sciences and law in 1922. In 1934 he was appointed as a judge in Pomerania after passing two exams in the years 1927–1929. In 1937 his work as criminal judge was praised by state officials as "avoiding undue sensitivity" and of "correct orientation" when passing out sentences.

=== Nazi career ===
Krüger claimed to participate in the Beer Hall Putsch in Munich. At the time he was a member of the Nazi Party and other Nazi organisations such as the Reichsbund Deutscher Beamter (German Civil Service), the NS-Rechtswahrerbund (National Socialist Lawyers Association), and the Volksbund für das Deutschtum im Ausland (Association for Germanism Abroad). He worked as a judge in Lauenburg (Lębork), Stargard (Stargard Szczeciński) and after 1940 in Chojnice (Konitz), where he was made an NSDAP-Ortsgruppenleiter and where he passed several thousand death sentences. From 1943 to 1945 he served in Nazi Germany's Kriegsmarine.

=== Political career in West Germany ===
After the war Krüger became a CDU politician and co-founder of the Federation of Expellees, joining the predecessor of the organisation in 1948 and serving as their president from 1959 to 1964. He was a member of the German Bundestag from 1957 to 1965, and served as deputy chair of the Committee for Displaced Persons, Refugees and War Victims from 1961 to 1963.

He became the Federal Minister for Displaced Persons, Refugees and War Victims in 1963, serving until 1964. He resigned from the cabinet and the chairmanship of the Federation of Expellees in 1964, amid controversy about his work during the Nazi era. The communist regime of East Germany, particularly Albert Norden, had attacked him heavily since December 1963. After he left parliament in 1965, Krüger worked as a lawyer. He died in Bonn.

== See also ==
- SS-Hauptsturmführer Hans Krueger also spelled Hans Krüger (1909–1988), SS Captain of the Gestapo involved in organizing the string of massacres after the commencement of Operation Barbarossa
