= Gottberg =

Gottberg is a surname. Notable people with the surname include:

- Curt von Gottberg (1896–1945), German Nazi official and SS commander
- Susanne Gottberg (born 1964), Finnish painter
- Wilhelm von Gottberg (born 1940), German politician
