= Association of Transylvanian Saxons in Germany =

Voluntary association

The Association of Transylvanian Saxons in Germany (German: Verband der Siebenbürger Sachsen in Deutschland) is a German organization formed in 1946 by Transylvanian Saxons (German: Siebenbürger Sachsen) who were resettled in Germany from Transylvania (German: Siebenbürgen). Its goals are the integration of Transylvanian Saxons in Germany and the preservation and promotion of Transylvanian Saxon culture.

It is based in Munich, Bavaria, southern Germany, and has over 25,000 members. It was renamed from the "Landsmannschaft der Siebenbürger Sachsen in Deutschland" in 2007.

== See also ==
- Democratic Forum of Germans in Romania
- Landsmannschaft der Buchenlanddeutschen
- Deutsch-Baltische Gesellschaft
- Society of Germans from Hungary
- Sudetendeutsche Landsmannschaft
