= Rudi Pawelka =

German politician

Federal Chairman of the Landsmannschaft Schlesien
- In office 2000–2013
- Preceded by: Herbert Hupka
- Succeeded by: Stephan Rauhut

Chairman of the Prussian Trust
- In office 2001–2005

Councilor in Leverkusen
- In office 2004–2009

Personal details
- Born: March 24, 1940 (age 86) Breslau, Silesia
- Party: CDU
- Children: 3
- Occupation: Police official; Politician

Rudi Pawelka is a German politician, representative of the German Christian Democratic Union.

Born on 24 March 1940, in Breslau, Silesia, Pawelka is an important German politician of the CDU. He is also the spokesman of the former German forced laborers (Arbeitskreises Deutsche Zwangsarbeiter or AKDZ) and a member of the Board of Trustees of the Silesian Museum in Görlitz.

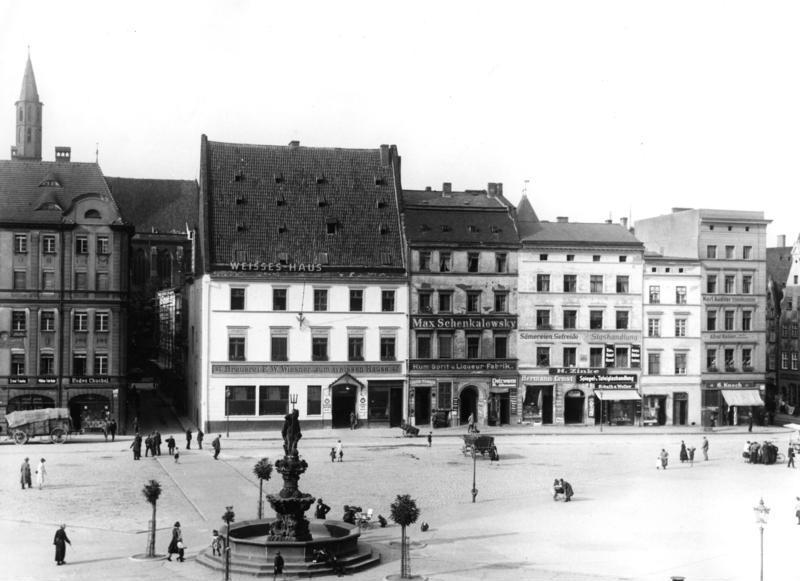
Breslau, 1930s

Pawelka was a Chief Police Director official. From 1971 was the second National chairman of the "Friends of former CSU" and is currently an active member of the CDU. Between 1975 and 1990 he was chairman of the CDU branch in Leverkusen-Rheindorf. From 1990 to 1994, and again from 2004 to 2009 he was a councilor in Leverkusen.

In 2000 he succeeded Herbert Hupka as federal chairman of the Landsmannschaft Schlesien. From 2001 to 2005 Pawelka was chairman of the Prussian Trust. In 2003, as a head of the Prussian Trust, he angered Jewish groups and caused outrage in Poland, which has long feared that some of the 12 million expelled in 1945 or their descendants would return to claim their properties.

Pawelka is widowed and has one son and two daughters. Since 1961 he has resided in Leverkusen in the Rhineland.

== See also ==
- List of German Christian Democratic Union politicians
