= Cīrava Palace =

Palace in Latvia

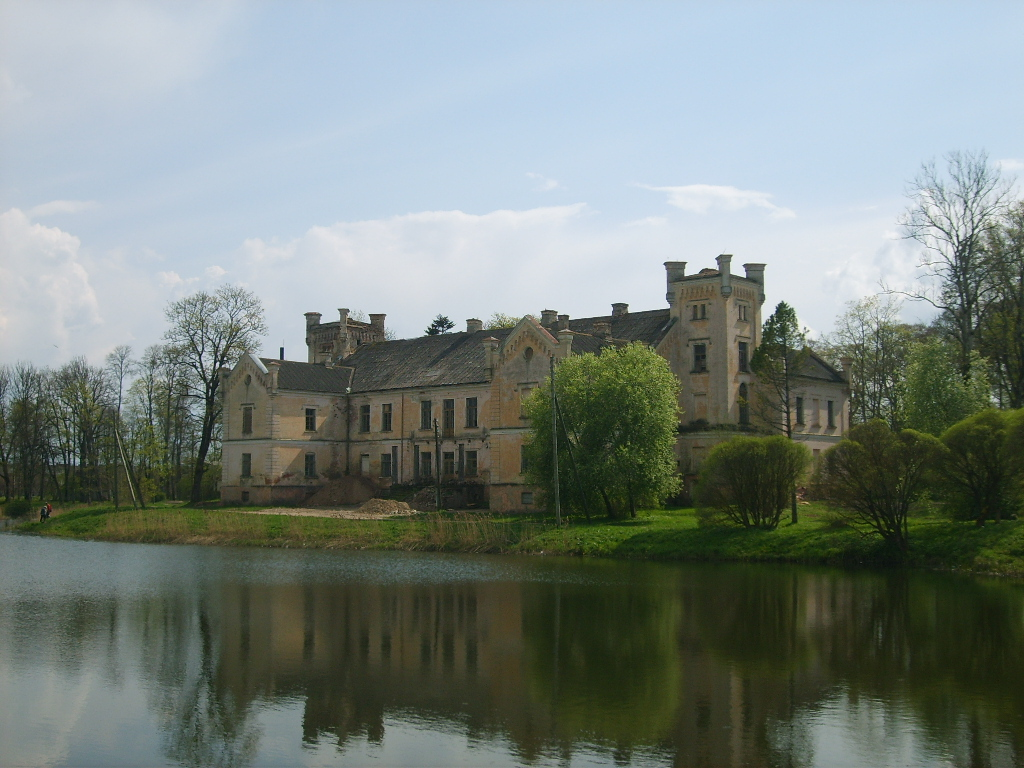
- Cīrava palace in 2008

- Location within Latvia

General information
- Architectural style: Neo-Gothic
- Location: Cīrava Parish, South Kurzeme Municipality, Latvia
- Coordinates: 56°44′06″N 21°23′07″E
- Completed: 1868
- Client: von Manteuffel family

Design and construction
- Architect: Teodor Zeiler

Cīrava Palace (Latvian: Cīravas muižas pils; German: Schloß Zierau) is located in the village of Cīrava, Cīrava Parish, South Kurzeme Municipality, in the Courland region of Latvia. It is a national architecture monument included in the list of the culture monuments under state protection. The oldest county administrative documents relating to the subsequent estate are no longer found in publications or extracts from the Baltic German historians archives.

== History ==
The palace has its roots in a time when the Aizpute and Sakaslejas county belonged to the bishopric of Courland. It was built in 1752 as a hunting palace for the German Baltic baron family von Manteuffel-Szoeges. It was an unimpressive, simple building. In 1868 the palace was rebuilt and expanded in the Tudor–Neo-Gothic style by the project of Teodor Zeiler. Interior elements in the palace are partly preserved, including ornamental plafonds in some rooms and a hearth with marble decorations dating back to the beginning of nineteenth century.

On 16 December 1730 the king confirmed that Otto Friedrich von Behr and his wife Katharina, and their descendants, were the owners of the old Cīrava manor. On 10 August 1774 King Stanisław August Poniatowski confirmed Herman Friedrich von Behr and his wife Elizabeth, and their descendants, as the new owners of the estate. In October 1781 the property was inherited by Šarlote Katarīna, and in the summer of 1781 it was acquired by Karl Gothard Ernst von Manteuffel-Szoeges, landlord of Kazdanga Palace.

In the spring of 1921, in accordance with Latvian Land Reform of 1920, the estate was nationalized and became part of the Latvian state, which took hold of the manor, some 700 ha. of arable land and 150 ha. of grasslands. From 1922 until 1951 the technical school of forestry (Meža skola) was housed in the palace. Later it served as technical school of agriculture. For the last few decades the palace has stood empty, and there are plans to renovate it and transform it to a hotel.

== Surroundings ==
The palace is surrounded by a nineteenth-century landscape park. There is also a decorative pond with two islands and several trees and bushes in the park. G. Kuffalt, the main gardener of Riga, took part in the creation of the Cīrava Palace park.

== See also ==
- List of palaces and manor houses in Latvia
