= Prussian Trust =

German corporation for WWII compensation

- Formation: 2000
- Website: https://www.preussische-treuhand.org/

The Prussian Trust, or Prussian Claims Society, (German: Preußische Treuhand GmbH & Co. KGaA) is a corporation registered in Düsseldorf, founded in 2000 as Preußische Treuhand GmbH by some descendants of German expellees, and supported by some officials of the Landsmannschaft Schlesien organization. It seeks to claim compensation from Poland and the Czech Republic, among others, for property confiscated from Germans expelled from territories which after World War II became parts of Poland and Czechoslovakia.

The chairman of the supervisory board is Rudi Pawelka, who also is president of the Landsmannschaft Schlesien, and vice president is Hans Günther Parplies, also vice president of the Federation of Expellees. The Trust probably has fewer than a hundred members.

== Compensation claims against Poland ==
Rudi Pawelka told the Daily Telegraph on 15 February 2004 that:

Germans held lands and properties in what is now Poland for hundreds of years. They have a deep, inner connection to the region and many want their properties back. Soon we will all be Europeans. Poland's accession to the EU will enable us to take our case to the Strasbourg court for the first time. Poland must not be allowed to discriminate against Germans.

The then-German chancellor Gerhard Schröder stated on 1 August 2004 that the German government will not support these claims. Also, the Polish Sejm declared that Poland will demand war reparations from Germany if the German government does not end the press for compensations. Some German politicians stated that the claims by the Sejm were ridiculous and had no legal basis. The corporation's activities have been repudiated by some German politicians who have addressed the issue, including the president of the Federation of Expellees, Erika Steinbach.

In December 2006, the corporation filed 23 individual claims against Poland in the European Court of Human Rights, an action which has been condemned by both the Polish and German governments.

The Polish government decided that the submissions warranted a comment by Anna Fotyga, the Polish Minister of the Foreign Affairs who "express [her] deepest concern upon receiving the information about a claim against Poland submitted by the Prussian Trust to the European Court of Human Rights".

Contributory factors to the special quality of relations between Germany and Poland include the former’s unconditional admission of guilt for the Second World War and its renouncement of subsequent material claims after the war. The Federal Government supports neither private restitution claims by expellees nor complaints like that submitted by the private Prussian Trust to the European Court of Human Rights. Federal Chancellor Merkel has repeatedly reaffirmed this position. (The German Federal Foreign Office, October 2008). (Note: Similar text was on the page in January 2007 (first time it was checked). When the page was updated in March 2008 the text (slightly modified from the initial text) remained on the page. It had been altered by 17 April 2009 (after the European Court of Human Rights case was finished to include a mention of the court's verdict).)

On 9 October 2008 the European Court of Human Rights declared the case of Preussische Treuhand v. Poland inadmissible, because of the non-retroactivity of the European Convention on Human Rights:

The Court would recall that Article 1 of Protocol No. 1 cannot be interpreted as imposing any general obligation on the Contracting States to return property which was transferred to them before they ratified the Convention. Nor does this provision impose any restrictions on the Contracting States’ freedom to determine the scope of property restitution or rehabilitation laws. The States are free to choose the conditions under which they agree to restore property rights of former owners and the Convention imposes no specific obligation on them to provide redress for wrongs or damage caused prior to their ratification of the Convention ...

— Nicolas Bratza President of the Court.

== See also ==
- Former eastern territories of Germany
- Federation of Expellees
- Flight and expulsion of Germans (1944–1950)
