= Ķintu well =

Historical well in Latvia

- Ķintu aka (Latvian)
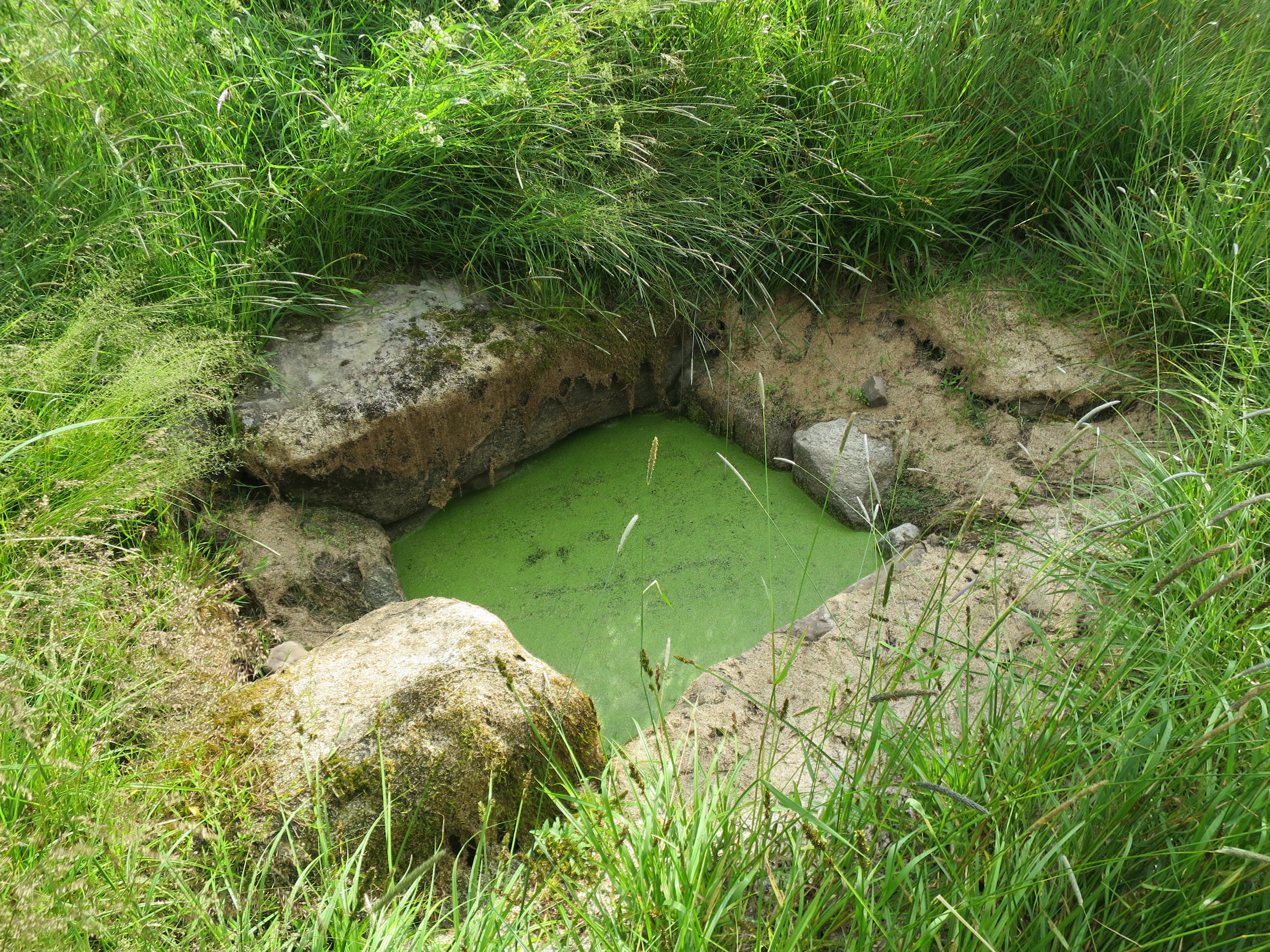
- Interactive map of Ķintu well
- 56°44′36.6″N 21°25′3″E
- Location: Cīrava parish, Latvia

Site notes
- Material: Stone

Ķintu well is a historical object in Cīrava parish, Latvia. It is made of large carved stone blocks up to 2 meters long. The cross-section of the well forms a square with 1.25 m long sides. The Ķintu well is an archaeological monument, possibly the remains of an earlier larger megalithic complex.
