= Reinhold Rehs =

German politician

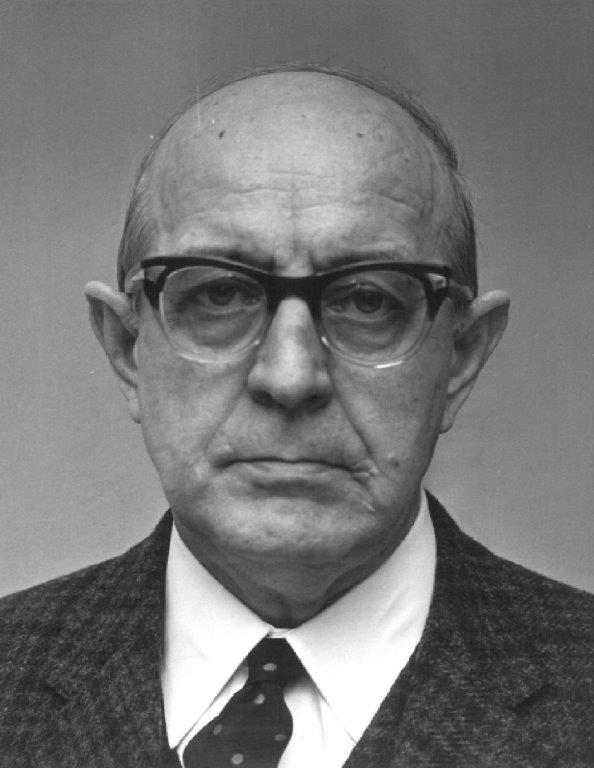

Landtag of Schleswig-Holstein
- In office 1950–1953

Member of the Bundestag
- In office 1953–1969
- Constituency: Rendsburg-Neumünster

Personal details
- Born: 12 October 1901 Klinthenen, Kingdom of Prussia, German Empire (now Znamenka, Russia)
- Died: 4 December 1971 (aged 70) Kiel, West Germany (now Germany)
- Party: SPD; CDU

Reinhold Rehs (12 October 1901 – 4 December 1971) was a German politician and chairman of the Federation of Expellees in 1967–70.

== Early life, family and education ==
Rehs was born in Klinthenen (now Znamenka in Pravdinsky District), district of Gerdauen, East Prussia (today Russia) as a son of a teacher of Huguenot descent, his family lived in East Prussia since their flight from France. He visited school in Königsberg and studied law at the Universities of Königsberg and Heidelberg.

== Career ==
He worked as a journalist for the Ostpreußische Zeitung in Königsberg (1923–24) and became a lawyer there in 1928. He joined the SA in 1933 and the Nazi Party in 1937.

In World War II he was conscripted to the Luftschutzwarndienst (air defence warning service) and became the head of the regional warning service of Danzig in 1944. Rehs was badly wounded in February 1945 and was evacuated to Western Germany.

In August 1945, Rehs started to work as a jurist at the Schleswig-Holstein State employment office and joined the Social Democratic Party of Germany in 1948. He was elected a Member of the Landtag of Schleswig-Holstein in 1950 and Member of the Bundestag in 1953. He became the Speaker (Chairman) of the Landsmannschaft Ostpreussen in 1966 and President of the Federation of Expellees in 1967. When Willy Brandt first announced his intended turnaround concerning the Former eastern territories of Germany at the SPD party congress in March 1968, Rehs, sitting in the first row, left the audience in protest.

After Brandt became Chancellor, Rehs seceded from the SPD in 1969 and joined the CDU in protest against the change in the German Ostpolitik leading to the Treaty of Warsaw

== Personal life and demise ==
Rehs died at age 70 in 1971.
