= Cīrava Parish =

Parish of Latvia

- parish of Latvia
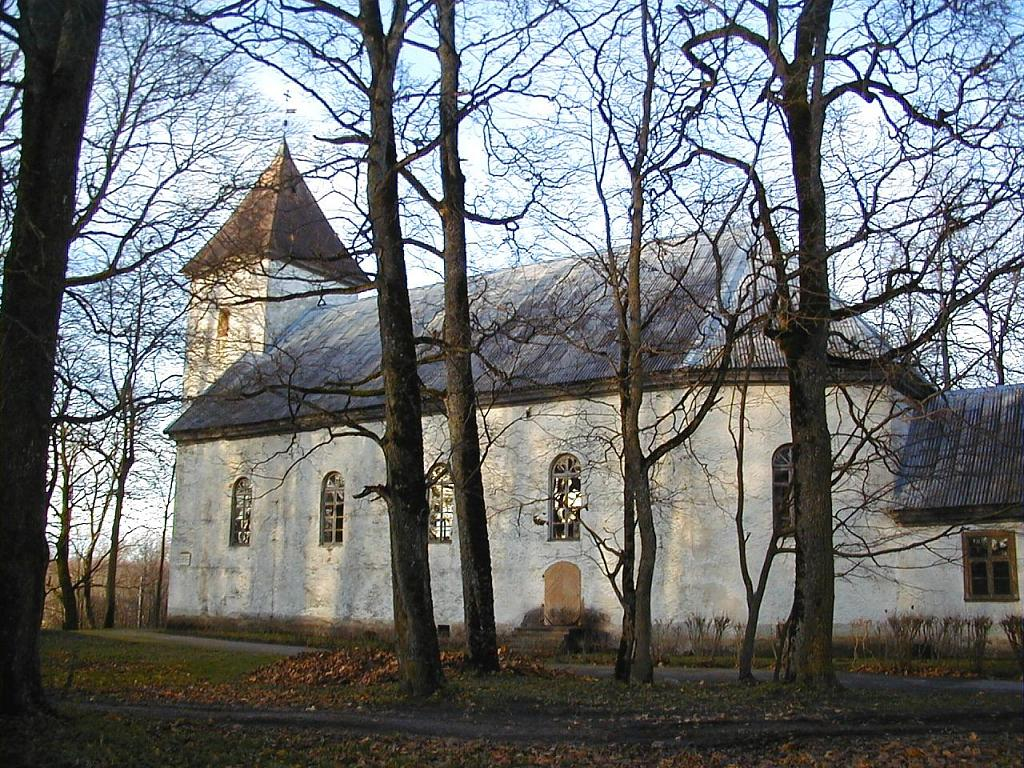

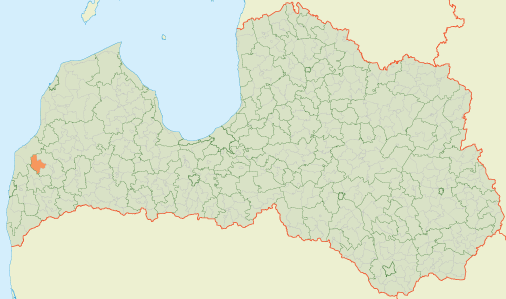
- 56°44′51″N 21°23′25″E
- Country: Latvia

Area
  - Total: 131.62 km^{2} (50.82 sq mi)
  - Land: 127.22 km^{2} (49.12 sq mi)
  - Water: 4.4 km^{2} (1.7 sq mi)

Population (1 January 2026)
  - Total: 897
  - Density: 7.05/km^{2} (18.3/sq mi)

Cīrava Parish (Latvian: Cīravas pagasts) is an administrative unit of South Kurzeme Municipality, Latvia. The parish has a population of 1285 (as of 1/07/2010) and covers an area of 131.6 km^{2}.

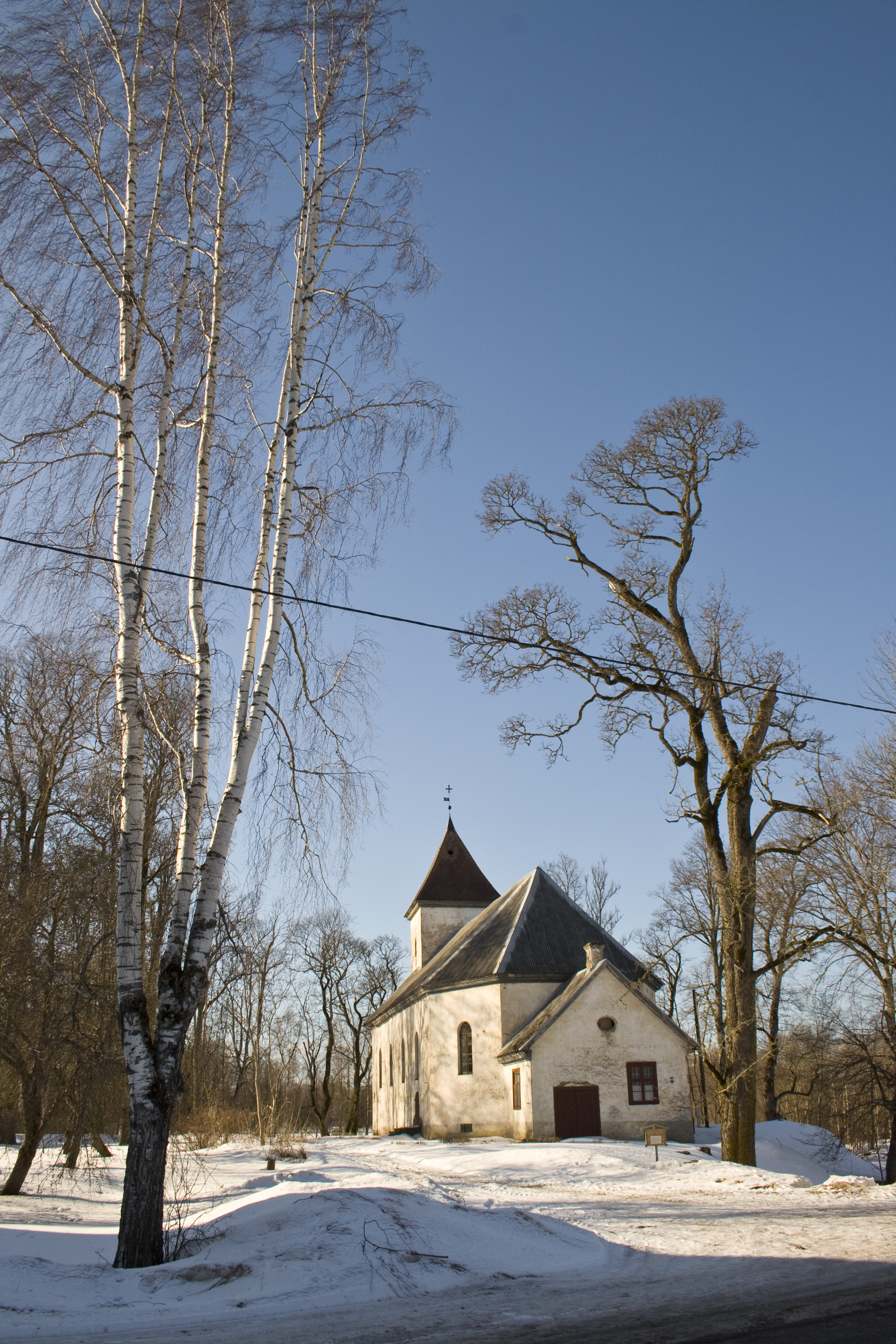
Lutheran church in Cīrava

== Villages of Cīrava parish ==
- Akmene
- Cīrava
- Dzērve (Dzērves skola)
- Dzērvenieki
- Marijas

== See also ==
- Cīrava Palace
- Dzērve Manor
- Ķintu well
