= Boja Manor =

Manor house in Latvia

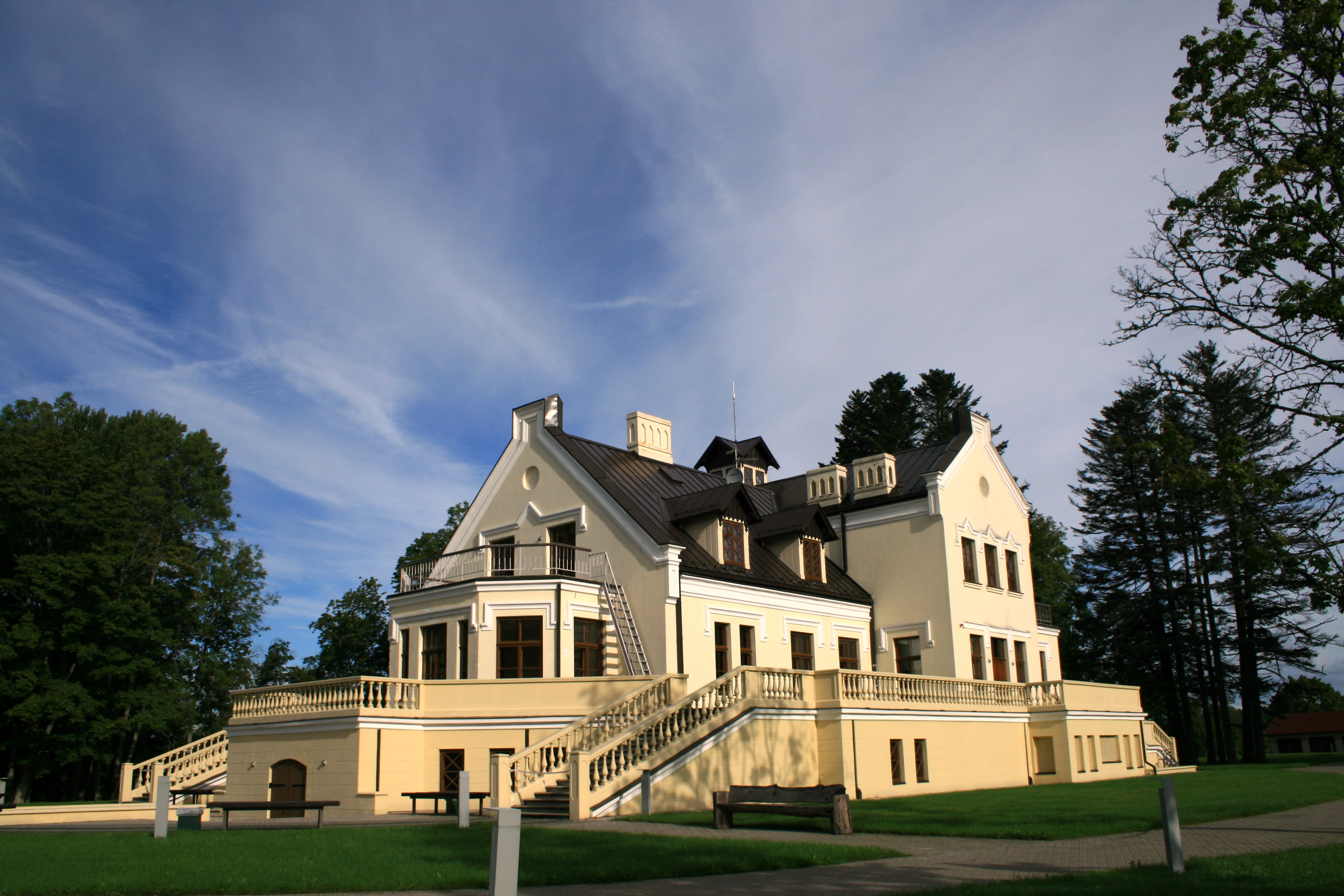

- Location within Latvia

General information
- Architectural style: Neo-Gothic
- Location: Kazdanga Parish, South Kurzeme Municipality, Latvia
- Coordinates: 56°40′44.9″N 21°39′27.5″E
- Completed: 1860
- Client: von Behr family

Boja Manor (Latvian: Boju muižas pils) is a manor house in Kazdanga Parish, South Kurzeme Municipality, in the historical region of Courland, in western Latvia.

== History ==
Boja manor house was built in 1860 for the estate owner Baron von Behr. The Latvian villa-type building is represented by the Boja Manor House; the Gothic shapes here are quite reserved, but also a bit like-minded - the designer did not try to highlight them, but focused on the spatial solution of the volume.

Presently the former Boja manor house is primarily used for Forest Museum exposition, which introduces the wealth of Latvian forest and the history of forest management. Manor park with two ponds and European larch plantations provides rustic surroundings. There is also a small café.

== See also ==
- List of palaces and manor houses in Latvia
