= Kazdanga Parish =

Parish of Latvia

- parish of Latvia
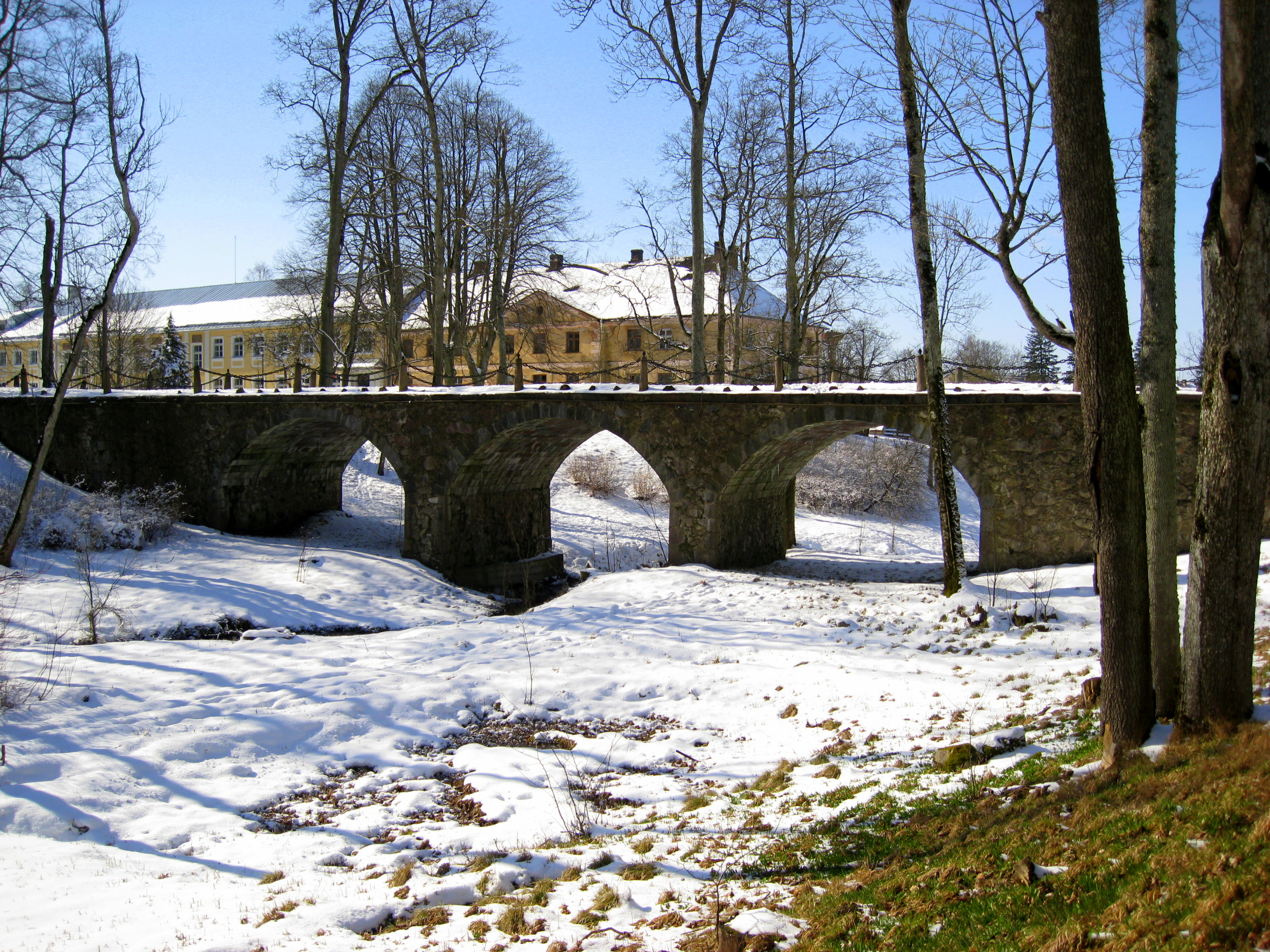

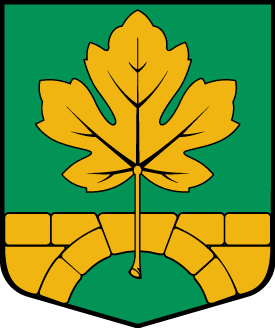
- Coat of arms

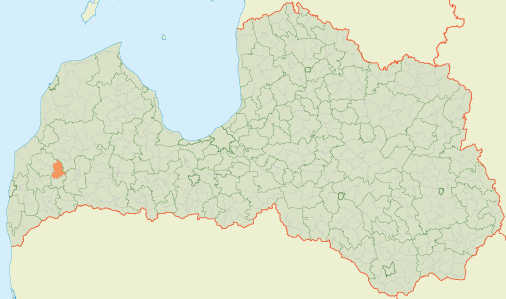
- 56°42′16″N 21°42′08″E
- Country: Latvia

Area
  - Total: 133.95 km^{2} (51.72 sq mi)
  - Land: 127.51 km^{2} (49.23 sq mi)
  - Water: 6.44 km^{2} (2.49 sq mi)

Population (1 January 2025)
  - Total: 1,091
  - Density: 8.556/km^{2} (22.16/sq mi)

Kazdanga Parish (Latvian: Kazdangas pagasts) is an administrative unit of South Kurzeme Municipality in the Courland region of Latvia. The parish covers an area of 133.95 km^{2} (51.72 sq mi).

== Villages of Kazdanga parish ==
- Bojas
- Cildi
- Kannenieki
- Kapši
- Kazdanga (parish administrative center)
- Mazbojas
- Rokaiži
- Tebras
- Valata
- Vecpils
- Ziemciems

== See also ==
- Kazdanga Palace
- Boja Manor
