= Dzērve Manor =

Manor house in Latvia

- Cīrava Parish, Courland, Latvia
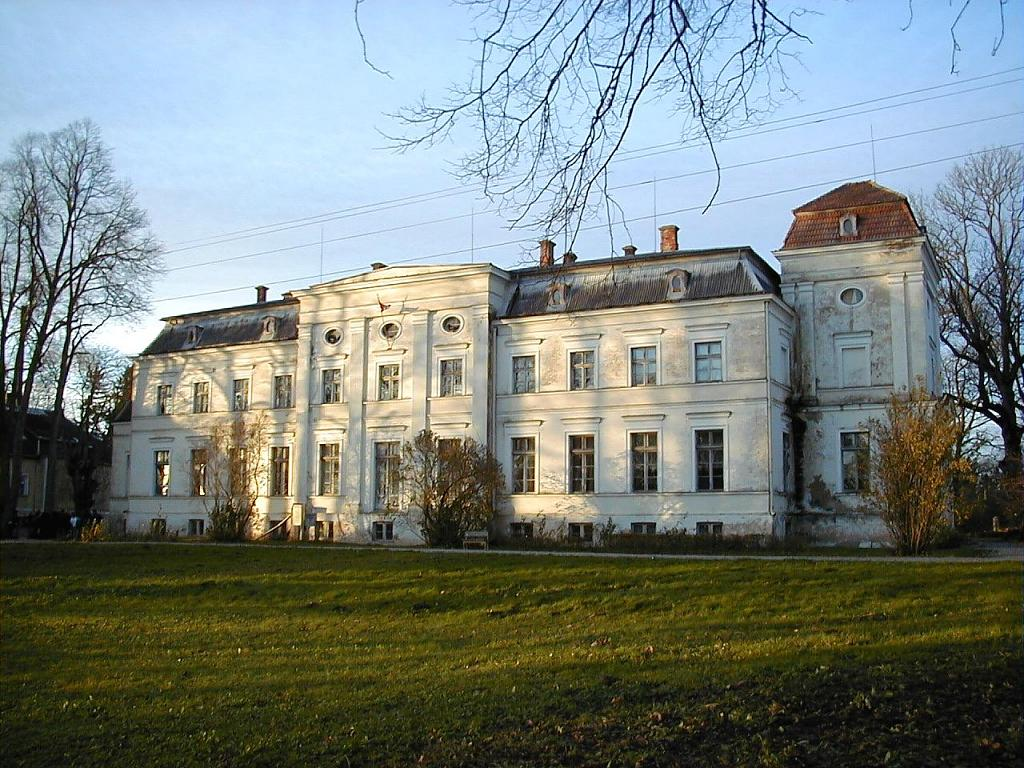

Site information
- Type: Manor

Location
- Coordinates: 56°45′01.4″N 21°24′12.8″E

Dzērve Manor (Latvian: Dzērves muižas pils), also called Lieldzērve Manor (German: Schloss Gross-Dserwen), is a manor house in Cīrava Parish in South Kurzeme Municipality in the historical region of Courland, in western Latvia.

== History ==
First owners of Manor were von Derschau barons. Dzērve Manor House was built in the early 19th century. It was nearly destroyed by fire in 1905 during 1905 Revolution. Manor was rebuilt between 1906 and 1912 in neoclassical style after the project of engineer-architect Gvido Berči. Original 19th century large white tile fireplace, staircase with handrail are well preserved, as well as later 20th century interior decorative elements. The manor complex also includes a 6.7 ha landscaped English style park. Created around 1870-1880 as a Kurzeme English style landscape park, surrounded by tilia and birch avenues. Park has notable big trees - oak (4.6 m) and horse chestnut (3.2 m). At present the manor houses Dzērve Elementary School.

== See also ==
- List of palaces and manor houses in Latvia
