= Federation of Expellees =

German organization for expelled ethnic Germans

- Bund der Vertriebenen
- Abbreviation: BdV
- Predecessor: Bund der Heimatvertriebenen (founded 1950)
- Formation: October 27, 1957
- Founded at: West Germany
- Type: Non-profit organization
- Location: Germany
- Affiliations: Center Against Expulsions; EUFV (European organization)

The Federation of Expellees (German: Bund der Vertriebenen; BdV) is a non-profit organization formed in West Germany on 27 October 1957 to represent the interests of German nationals of all ethnicities and foreign ethnic Germans and their families (usually naturalised as German nationals after 1949) who either fled their homes in parts of Central and Eastern Europe, or were forcibly expelled following World War II.

Since 2014 the president of the Federation has been Bernd Fabritius, who arrived in West Germany in 1984 as a Transylvanian Saxon refugee from Agnita, Socialist Republic of Romania, and who has since been elected as a Christian Social Union in Bavaria Member of the Bundestag.

== History ==
It is estimated that in the aftermath of World War II between 13 and 16 million ethnic Germans fled or were expelled from parts of Central and Eastern Europe, including the former eastern territories of Germany (parts of present-day Poland), the Czech Republic, Slovakia, Slovenia, Hungary, Croatia, Serbia (mostly from the Vojvodina region), the Kaliningrad Oblast of (now) Russia, hitherto USSR (in the immediate aftermath of the Second World War) and prior to this, the northern part of East Prussia, Lithuania, Romania and other East European countries.

=== Charter of the German Expellees ===
The Charter of the German Expellees (German: Charta der deutschen Heimatvertriebenen) of 5 August 1950, announced their belief in requiring that "the right to the homeland is recognized and carried out as one of the fundamental rights of mankind given by God", while renouncing revenge and retaliation in the face of the "unending suffering" (unendliche Leid) of the previous decade, and supporting the unified effort to rebuild Germany and Europe.

The charter has been criticised for avoiding mentioning Nazi atrocities of Second World War and Germans who were forced to emigrate due to Nazi repressions. Critics argue that the Charter presents the history of German people as starting from the expulsions, while ignoring events like the Holocaust.

Professor Micha Brumlik pointed out that one third of signatories were former devoted Nazis and many actively helped in realisation of Hitler's goals.

Ralph Giordano wrote in Hamburger Abendblatt "the Charter doesn't contain a word about Hitler, Auschwitz and Buchenwald. Not to mention any sign of apologies for the suffering of the murdered people", "avoids mentioning the reasons for expulsions" and called the document "example of German art of crowding out the truth (...) The fact that the charter completely ignores the reasons for the expulsions deprives it of any value".

=== German laws concerning the expellees ===
Between 1953, when the Federal Expellee Law was passed, and 1991, the West German government passed several laws dealing with German expellees. The most notable of these is the "Law of Return" which granted German citizenship to any ethnic German. Several additions were later made to these laws.

The German Law of Return declared refugee status to be inheritable. According to the Federal Expellee Law, "the spouse and the descendants" of an expellee are to be treated as if they were expellees themselves, regardless of whether they had been personally displaced. The Federation of Expellees has steadily lobbied to preserve the inheritability clause.

=== Formation of the Federation ===
The Federation of Expellees was formed on 27 October 1957 in West Germany. Before its founding, the Bund der Heimatvertriebenen (League of Expellees and Deprived of Rights), formed in 1950, represented the interests of displaced German expellees. Intriguingly, in its first few years, the league was more successful in West Germany than in East Germany.

=== German reunification ===
Previous West German governments, especially those led by the Christian Democratic Union, had shown more rhetorical support for the territorial claims made on behalf of German refugees and expellees. Although the Social Democrats showed strong support for the expellees, especially under Kurt Schumacher and Erich Ollenhauer, Social Democrats in more recent decades have generally been less supportive – and it was under Willy Brandt that West Germany recognized the Oder-Neisse line as the eastern German border with Poland under his policy of Ostpolitik. In reality, accepting the internationally recognized boundary made it more possible for eastern Germans to visit their lost homelands.

In 1989–1990 the West German government realized they had an opportunity to reunify the Federal Republic of Germany and the Soviet created German Democratic Republic. But they believed that if this were to be achieved, it had to be done quickly. One of the potential complications was the claim to the historical eastern territories of Germany; unless this was renounced, some foreign governments might not agree to German reunification. The West German government under the CDU accepted the 1990 Treaty on the Final Settlement With Respect to Germany (Two Plus Four Agreement), which officially re-established the sovereignty of both German states. A condition of this agreement was that Germany accept the post-World War II frontiers. Upon reunification in 1990, the constitution was amended to state that Germany's territory had reached its full extent. Article 146 was amended so that Article 23 of the current constitution could be used for reunification. Once the five "reestablished federal states" in the east had been united with the west, the Basic Law was amended again to show that there were no other parts of Germany, which existed outside of the unified territory, that had not acceded.

=== 2000s ===
In 2000 the Federation of Expellees also initiated the formation of the Center Against Expulsions (German: Zentrum gegen Vertreibungen). Chairwoman of this Center is Erika Steinbach, who headed it together with former SPD politician Prof. Dr. Peter Glotz (died 2005).

Recently Erika Steinbach, the chair of the Federation of Expellees, has rejected any compensation claims. The vice president of the Federation Rudi Pawelka is however a chairman of the supervisory board of the Prussian Trust.

A European organisation for expellees has been formed — EUFV — headquartered in Trieste, Italy.

== Organization ==
The expellees are organized in 21 regional associations (Landsmannschaften), according to the areas of origin of its members, 16 state organizations (Landesverbände) according to their current residence, and 5 associate member organizations. It is the single representative federation for the approximately 15 million Germans who after fleeing, being expelled, evacuated or emigrating, found refuge in the Federal Republic of Germany. The Federation claims to have 1.3 million members (including non-displaced persons), and to be a political force of some influence in Germany. This figure was disputed in January 2010 by the German news service DDP, which reported an actual membership of 550,000. According to Erika Steinbach only 100,000 of the members contribute financially.

The federation helps its members to integrate into German society. Many of the members assist the societies of their place of birth.

=== Presidents ===
From 1959 to 1964, the first president of the Federation was Hans Krüger, a former Nazi judge and activist. After the war Krüger was a West German politician of the Christian Democratic Union (CDU), was a member of parliament from 1957 to 1965, served as Federal Minister for Displaced Persons, Refugees and War Victims for 4 months in 1963–64 in the First Cabinet of Ludwig Erhard. He stepped down from cabinet and other positions in 1964 amid controversy about his war-time background. Krüger was succeeded as president by Wenzel Jaksch in 1964 who held the position until his untimely death in 1966.

- Hans Krüger (1959–1963) BdV - Der BdV - Geschichte des BdV (resigned from his post due to his Nazi past)
- Wenzel Jaksch (1964–1966)
- Reinhold Rehs (1967–1970)
- Herbert Czaja (1970–1994)
- Fritz Wittmann (1994–1998)
- Erika Steinbach (1998–2014)
- Bernd Fabritius (2014–2025)
- Stephan Mayer (2025-present)

=== Member organizations ===
==== Regional ====
- Landsmannschaft Ostpreußen
- Landsmannschaft Schlesien
- Deutsch-Baltische Gesellschaft
- Landsmannschaft der Banater Schwaben e.V.
- Landsmannschaft Berlin-Mark Brandenburg
- Landsmannschaft der Bessarabiendeutschen e.V.
- Landsmannschaft der Buchenlanddeutschen (Bukowina) e.V.
- Bund der Danziger e.V.
- Landsmannschaft der Dobrudscha und Bulgariendeutschen
- Landsmannschaft der Donauschwaben, Bundesverband e.V.
- Karpatendeutsche Landsmannschaft Slowakei e.V.
- Landsmannschaft der Deutschen aus Litauen e.V.
- Landsmannschaft der Oberschlesier e.V. – Bundesverband –
- Pommersche Landsmannschaft – Zentralverband – e.V.
- Landsmannschaft der Deutschen aus Russland e.V.
- Landsmannschaft der Sathmarer Schwaben in der Bundesrepublik Deutschland e.V.
- Landsmannschaft der Siebenbürger Sachsen in Deutschland e.V.
- Sudetendeutsche Landsmannschaft Bundesverband e.V.
- Landsmannschaft der Deutschen aus Ungarn
- Landsmannschaft Weichsel-Warthe Bundesverband e.V.
- Landsmannschaft Westpreußen e.V.

==== State ====
- Landesverband Baden-Württemberg
- Landesverband Bayern
- Landesverband Berlin
- Landesverband Brandenburg
- Landesverband Bremen
- Landesverband Hamburg
- Landesverband Hessen
- Landesverband Mecklenburg-Vorpommern
- Landesverband Niedersachsen
- Landesverband Nordrhein-Westfalen
- Landesverband Rheinland-Pfalz
- Landesverband Saar
- Landesverband Sachsen / Schlesische Lausitz
- Landesverband Sachsen-Anhalt
- Landesverband Schleswig-Holstein
- Landesverband Thüringen

== Criticism ==
When in government, both CDU and SPD have tended to favor improved relations with Central and Eastern Europe, even when this conflicts with the interests of the displaced people. The issue of the eastern border and the return of the Heimatvertriebene to their ancestral homes are matters which the current German government, German constitutional arrangements and German treaty obligations have virtually closed.

The refugees' claims were unanimously rejected by the affected countries and became a source of mistrust between Germany, Poland and the Czech Republic. These governments argue that the expulsion of Germans and related border changes were not enacted by the Polish or Czech governments, but rather were ordered by the Potsdam Conference. Furthermore, the nationalization of private property by Poland's former communist government did not apply only to Germans but was enforced on all people, regardless of ethnic background. A further complication is that many of the current Polish population in historical eastern Germany are themselves expellees (or descendants of expellees) who, totaling 1.6 million, were driven from Polish areas annexed by the Soviet Union and were forced to leave their homes and property behind as well.

Some German-speakers had been settled in occupied Poland after 1939 by the Nazis. Treating these ex-colonists as expellees under German law, Erika Steinbach included, adds to the controversy. However, the vast majority of expelled Germans were descended from families who had lived in Eastern Europe for many centuries, while the majority of German colonists in Nazi-occupied Poland were Baltic and other East European Germans themselves displaced by the Nazi-Soviet population transfers.

=== Nazi background ===
During the Cold War, the Federation was accused by the GDR and Poland of continuing Nazi ideology. A 2012 study confirmed that eleven of the thirteen members of the first council of the Federation "...were deeply involved in the Nazi regime."

The Polish daily newspaper Rzeczpospolita reported that during BdV meetings in 2003, publications expressing anti-Polish sentiment and accusing Poles of ethnic cleansing towards ethnic Germans were available for sale, as were recordings of Waffen SS marches on compact discs, including songs glorifying the Invasion of Poland. Also, far right organizations openly distributed their materials at BdV meetings. While the BdV officially denied involvement in this, no steps were taken to address the concerns raised.

In February 2009, the Polish newspaper Polska alleged that over one third of the Federation top officials were former Nazi activists, and based this on a 2006 article published by the German magazine Der Spiegel. The German paper Frankfurter Allgemeine Zeitung, later revealed that Der Spiegel had written this not in respect to the Federation of Expellees, but instead about a previous organization that was dissolved in 1957.

In 2019, the Federation's Vice President Siegbert Ortmann acknowledged that several members of the organization had been former Nazis, as well that some members had expressed support for far-right parties like NPD and AfD, he also reiterated that the organization would not cooperate with AfD.

== Notable people ==
- Heinz Neumeyer, German amateur historian

== See also ==
- All-German Bloc/League of Expellees and Deprived of Rights
- Organised persecution of ethnic Germans
- Pursuit of Nazi collaborators
- German eastward settlement
- Nazi–Soviet population transfers
- History of Poland
- History of Pomerania
- History of Silesia
- History of Prussia
- History of the Czech lands
- Ethnic cleansing
- Deutsch-Baltische Gesellschaft
