= Heinz Neumeyer =

German historian

Heinz Neumeyer is a German amateur historian. He specializes in the history of Pomerania and Prussia.

He is associated with the League of Expellees. His views on Polish-German relations have been criticized as biased; for example Neumeyer has claimed that the Second Polish Republic was far more responsible for starting World War II than Nazi Germany. Edmund Spevack, a Harvard lecturer on history and literature noted in East European Quarterly that Neumayer represents at best an amateur German nationalist historian, and at worst fits in tradition of biased, emotionally manipulative historiography, and his works accordingly do not deserve to be seen as a reliable source. Similarly, Karin Friedrich in The Slavonic and East European Review said that Neumeyer's writing is too emotional for a scholar, uses "the language of national prejudice and anachronistic references", and contains numerous factual errors.

== Works ==
- Die staatsrechtliche Stellung Westpreussens zur Zeit der "polnischen Oberhoheit" (1454-1772), 1953
- Westpreussen ein Blick auf seine Geschichte, 1955
- Der Kreis Stuhm, Westpreussen ein Blick auf seine Geschichte, 1958
- Danzig : ein Blick auf seine Geschichte, 1961
- Westpreussen : ein deutsches Land, 1963
- Für einen besseren Frieden Mitarbeiterkongress 1965, 1965
- Bibliographie zur Kirchengeschichte von Danzig und Westpreussen, 1967
- Aus dem Kirchenleben Westpreussens, 1971
- Kirchengeschichte von Danzig und Westpreussen in evangelischer Sicht, 1971
- Namenregister zum Teil B. Westpreußen des "Altpreußischen evangelischen Pfarrerbuches" von Friedwald Moeller unter Berücksichtigung der von Arnold Golon 1978 verfaßten "Erläuterungen", 1986
- Westpreussen : Geschichte und Schicksal, 1993
