= Herbert Hupka =

German-Jewish journalist, politician (1915-2006)

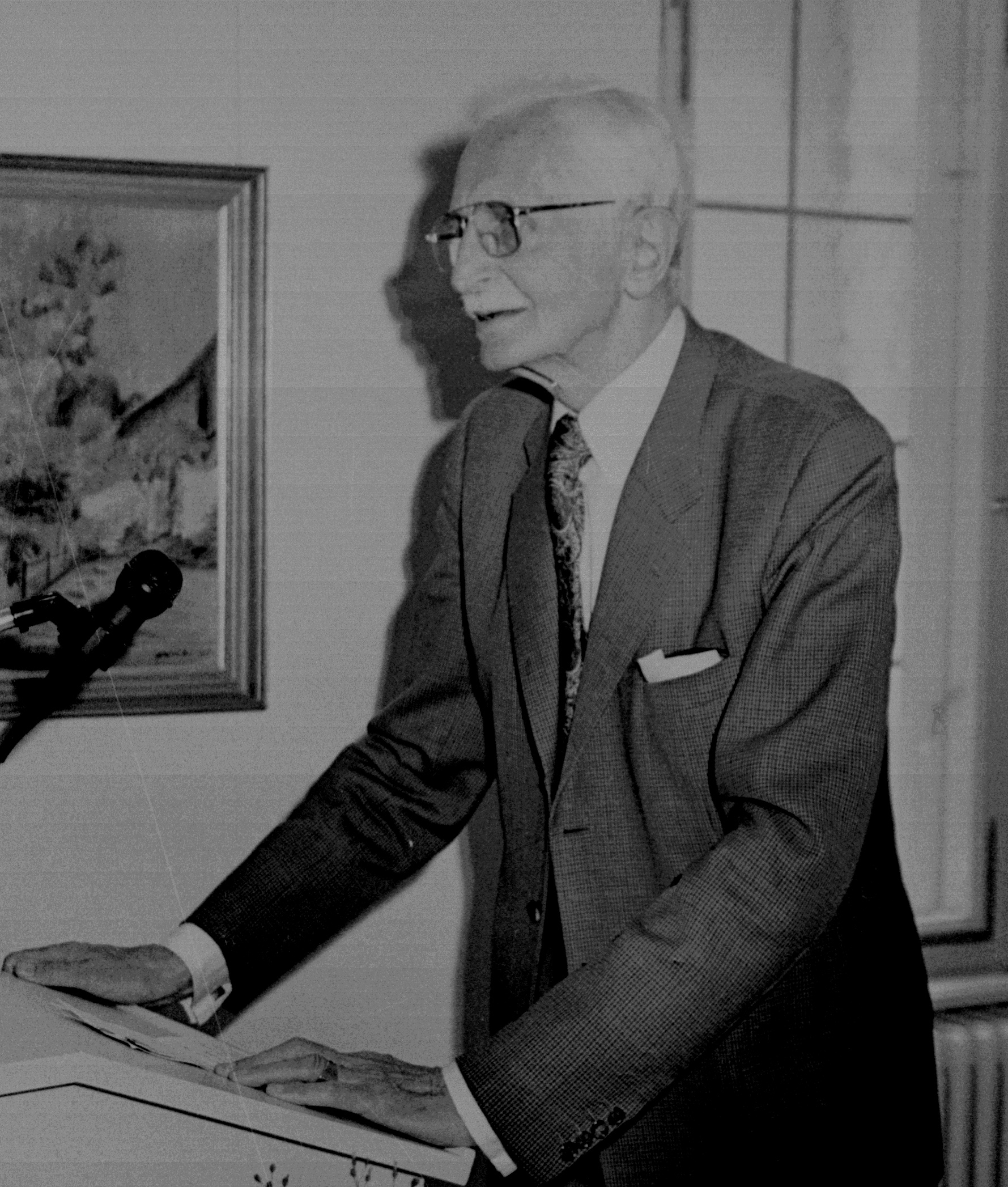

Member of the Bundestag
- In office 20 October 1969 – 18 February 1987

Personal details
- Born: Herbert Hupka; August 15, 1915 Diyatalawa, British Ceylon (now Sri Lanka)
- Died: August 24, 2006 (aged 91) Bonn, Germany
- Party: CDU (1972–2006)
- Other political affiliations: SPD (before 1972)
- Education: University of Breslau
- Occupation: Journalist, politician
- Known for: Chairman of the Landsmannschaft Schlesien; Opposition to Ostpolitik

Herbert Hupka (August 15, 1915 – August 24, 2006) was a German journalist, politician (SPD and later the CDU), and advocate for the Germans expelled from neighbouring countries after the Second World War.

== Early life ==
Hupka was born in a British internment camp in Diyatalawa, British Ceylon, to a Silesian German Catholic professor, Erich Hupka and a Jewish-German Lutheran mother, Sara Rosenthal. Herbert Hupka grew up in Ratibor, Upper Silesia (Free State of Prussia, Germany). In his younger years, Hupka was raised in the Catholic religion and close to the democratic Catholic Zentrum party. After having served in the Wehrmacht at the Eastern Front, and after having completed his Habilitation, Hupka was expelled from the Wehrmacht in August 1944 for being a "half-Jew" because his mother was Jewish; she survived deportation to and internment in Theresienstadt concentration camp. Following World War II, their Upper Silesian hometown became part of the People's Republic of Poland and Hupka and his mother were expelled to West Germany.

== Politics and Expellee Issues ==
Hupka was a member of the Bundestag from 1969 to 1987. He was also president of the Eastern German Culture Council (German: Ostdeutscher Kulturrat) and vice-president of the Federation of Expellees (Bund der Vertriebenen).

The expellees' issues formed the kernel of his political activities. He was the chairman of the Landsmannschaft Schlesien from 1968 to 2000. He was also chairman of the Eastern German Culture Council and vice-chairman of the Federation of Expellees from historical eastern Germany.Herbert Hupka opposed the Ostpolitik initiated by Willy Brandt and continued by subsequent administrations led by both the SPD and, later, the CDU. These policies acknowledged the territorial changes that occurred after World War II and explicitly rejected any attempts to reclaim territories and former provinces that had become part of Poland or the Russian SFSR. In contrast, Hupka advocated for the incorporation of these territories into a unified future German state. by further SPD and even (later) CDU-led administrations. These policies subscribed to the acceptance of the territorial changes that took place after the Second World War; this line explicitly denied all attempts to regain these territories and former provinces, which had become parts of Poland or the Russian SFSR. Herbert Hupka, on the other hand, spoke in favour of incorporating the territories into a unified, future German state. His opinions, which were regarded as revanchist, made him unpopular not only with the left, as he opposed the recognition of the Oder-Neiße border with the People's Republic of Poland. On 29 February 1972, Hupka crossed the floor from the Bundestag faction of the SPD to the CDU/CSU faction. Nevertheless, in 1985, CDU-leader and federal chancellor Helmut Kohl also refused to speak at the Landsmannschaft Schlesien's annual conference unless its theme, "Schlesien bleibt unser" ("Silesia remains ours [i.e. German]") was changed to a less controversial theme. Hupka was one of the Landsmannschaft's members who refused to change the theme, thereby conflicting heavily with Kohl, leader of the CDU. In the end, he agreed to change the name to "Silesia remains our future in a common Europe of free nations".

Hupka, once the target of Polish and Soviet communist (and nationalist) propaganda, was later employed as an advisor by the local government of present-day Silesia and was awarded the title of an honorary citizen of Racibórz, the historic town of his youth. Later in life, Hupka partially gave up his former views on totally restoring the pre-1945 borders of Germany and became a conditional supporter of the German-Polish rapprochement.

== Death ==
Hupka died on 24 August 2006 at his home in Bonn, after an accident. The causes of the accident have not been fully investigated.
