= Bund der Danziger =

The Bund der Danziger ("Association of Danzigers") is an organization of German refugees from Danzig expelled from their homes after World War II. The organization was founded in 1946.

== See also ==
- Expulsion of Germans after World War II
- Federation of Expellees
- Flight and expulsion of Germans (1944–1950)
- Free City of Danzig
