= Wenzel Jaksch =

Czech Sudeten German politician

- Wenzel Jaksch in 1930
- Born: 25 September 1896; Langstrobnitz, Kingdom of Bohemia, Austria-Hungary
- Died: 27 November 1966 (aged 70); Wiesbaden, West Germany
- Occupation: Politician
- Political party: SPÖ; DSAP; SPD

Wenzel Jaksch (25 September 1896 – 27 November 1966) was a Sudeten German Social Democrat politician and the president of the Federation of Expellees in 1964 to 1966.

== Biography ==
Jaksch was born in Langstrobnitz, Bohemia, Austria-Hungary (now Horní Stropnice, Czech Republic), and started to work as a construction worker in the age of 14 in Vienna. He joined the Austrian Social Democratic Party in 1913 and served in the Austrian Army in World War I, where he was badly wounded. After World War I he started to work as a journalist for a German language Social-Democratic newspaper in Czechoslovakia.

In 1929 he was elected as a member of the Parliament of Czechoslovakia in Prague representing the German Social Democratic Workers Party in the Czechoslovak Republic, of which he became the chairman in 1938. Jaksch opposed the growing influence of Nazis in Sudeten German Politics. After Germany invaded Czechoslovakia in March 1939, Wenzel escaped to Poland, and after the German invasion of Poland to Great Britain, where he represented the interests of the Sudeten Germans in the Czechoslovak government-in-exile. During the war, Jaksch's relations with the Czechoslovak leadership became strained as their willingness to sacrifice the Sudetenland Germans in favor of more powerful allies grew increasingly obvious. After World War II the Germans were expelled from Czechoslovakia. Influenced by Edvard Beneš, the British Government refused to allow Jaksch's return to West Germany until 1949. In 1949 he became responsible for Refugee affairs in the Social-Democratic Party of Germany, from 1950 to 1953 he became director of the Hessian State Office for Expellees, Refugees and Evacuees, and in 1951 he founded the Seliger-Gemeinde, an Association of Sudeten German Social Democrats. In April 1960 Jaksch regretted that West German politicians officially claimed only the 1937 borders of former Nazi Germany and declared that "No Sudeten German would go back to his homeland if he felt that he would belong to a minority", demanding annexation and union (Anschluss) of "German speaking territories" with Germany as a "sensible solution". In 1957 he was elected a member of the Bundestag, in 1961 he became the vice-president of the Sudeten German Federal Assembly and in 1964 he became the President of the German Federation of Expellees.

Jaksch was the president of the German Foundation for European Peace Questions (Deutsche Stiftung für Europäische Friedensfragen) and a member of the Sudeten German Council.

Jaksch died in a road accident in Wiesbaden.

== Awards ==
- Grand Merit Cross with Star of the Order of Merit of the Federal Republic of Germany
- Badge of Honour of the Federation of Expellees (Bund der Vertriebenen)
- Honorary letter of the Sudeten German Homeland Association
- Rudolf Lodgmann Badge
- Jaksch Wenzel Jaksch prize of Seliger community is named (mentality Community Sudeten Social Democrats).
- Streets named in his honour in Wiesbaden, Nauheim, Bad Vilbel and Griesheim (where he lived)
- Memorial plaque at Lindauer 34–36 in Ottakring (the 16th district of Vienna) at the great social democrats

== Publications ==
- "Was kommt nach Hitler?" In: Jitka Vondrová, Češi a sudetoněmecká otázka, 1939
- Can industrial peoples be transferred? The future of the Sudeten population, Executive of the Sudeten Social Democratic Party (Herausg.), London 1943
- "Mass transfer of minorities", in: Socialist commentary (4 S.), London, ca. 1944
- Sudeten labour and the Sudeten problem. A report to international labour, Herausg.: Executive of the Sudeten German Social Democracy Party, London 1945. - 47 S.
- Wir heischen Gehör - ein wichtiges historisches Dokument für die Wiedergutmachung der völkerrechtswidrigen Ausweisungen; Petition an die Vereinten Nationen / von Wenzel Jaksch (37 S.). München, Verl. "Das Volk", 1948.
- Sozialdemokratie und Sudetenproblem (15 S.), Frankfurt a. M./Höchst, 1949
- Der Dolchstoß gegen den Frieden. Richters neue Legende, SPD-Faltblatt, Bonn, ca. 1950
- Heimatrecht. Anspruch und Wirklichkeit (with Erich von Hoffmann), Verlag der Altherrenschaft bündischer Studentenverbände, Erlangen 1957.
- Europas Weg nach Potsdam (533 S.), 1958; 4. Auflage (mit einem Nachruf von Willy Brandt), München 1990, ISBN 3-7844-2304-3. (Das Hauptwerk von Wenzel Jaksch)
- Der 4. März 1919 und das Elend der deutschen Geschichtsschreibung, Verlag des Münchner Buchgewerbehauses, München 1959.
- "Deutsche Ostpolitik – ein Experiment in Sachlichkeit", in: Die Neue Gesellschaft, Nr. 12/1965, S. 800–802.
- Gedanken zur Ostpolitik, Verlag "Die Brücke", Hg.: Seliger-Gemeinde, 32 Seiten, ca. 1966

== Sources ==
- Martin K. Bachstein: Wenzel Jaksch und die sudetendeutsche Sozialdemokratie. Munich, 1974.
- Detlef Brandes: Der Weg zur Vertreibung 1938–1945. Pläne und Entscheidungen zum Transfer der Deutschen aus der Tschechoslowakei und aus Polen. Munich, 2001.
- Edmund Jauernig: Sozialdemokratie und Revanchismus. Zur Geschichte und Politik Wenzel Jakschs und der Seliger Gemeinde. Deutscher Verlag der Wissenschaften, East Berlin 1968.
- Hans-Werner Martin: "… nicht spurlos aus der Geschichte verschwinden": Wenzel Jaksch und die Integration der sudetendeutschen Demokraten in die SPD nach dem II. Weltkrieg (1945–1949). Lang, Frankfurt, 1996.
- Friedrich Prinz: Benes, Jaksch und die Sudetendeutschen. Stuttgart: Seliger-Archiv, 1975, 76 S.
- Michael Schwartz: Wenzel Jaksch (1896–1966). Biografische Schlaglichter auf einen Sozialdemokraten aus Mitteleuropa (Beiträge aus dem Archiv der sozialen Demokratie, 19), Bonn: Friedrich-Ebert-Stiftung 2023 (in German).
- Emil Werner: Wenzel Jaksch, Bonn 1991.
