= Wilhelm von Gottberg =

German politician

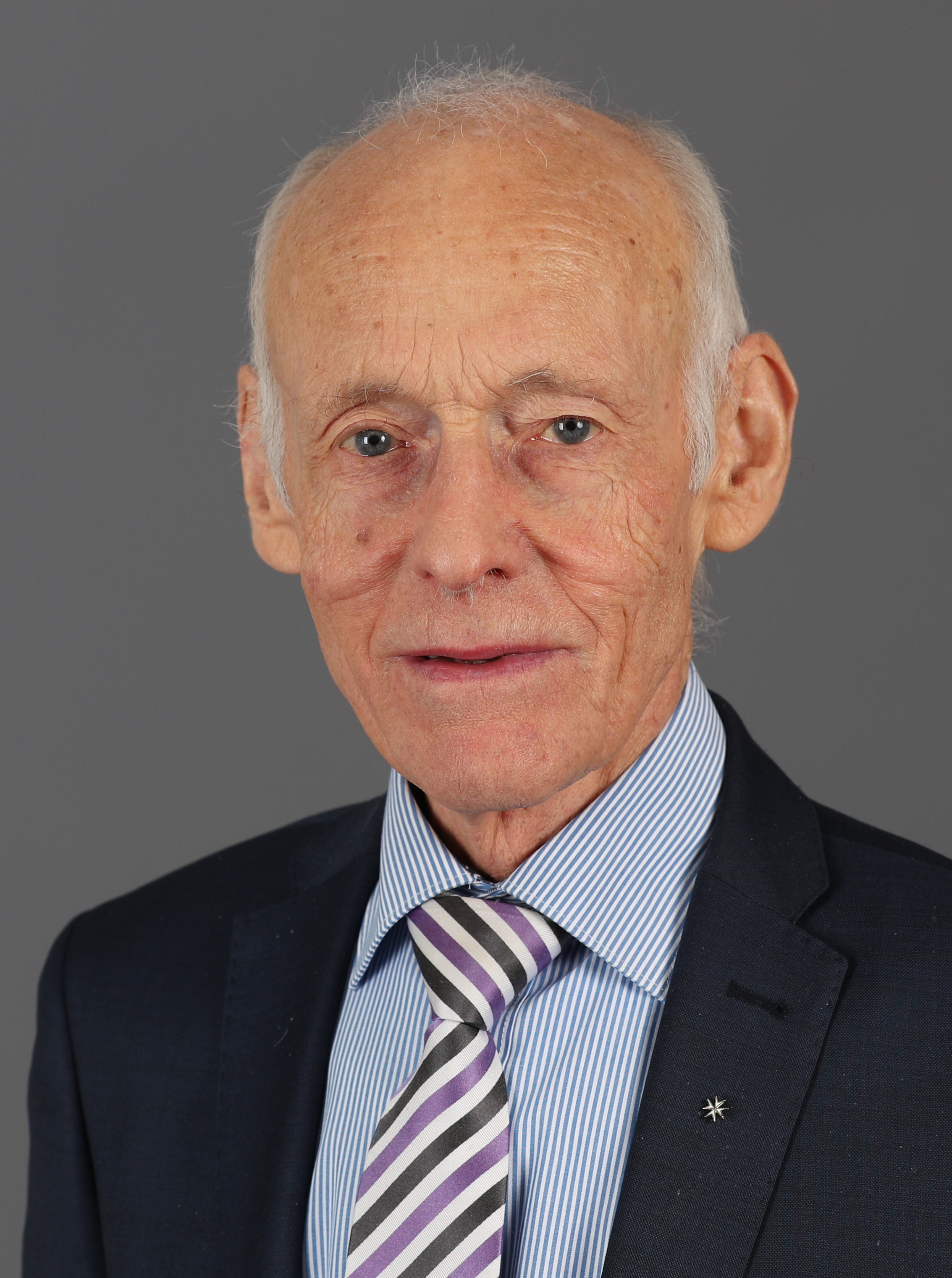
- Gottberg in 2020

Member of the Bundestag for Lower Saxony
- In office 24 October 2017 – 26 October 2021
- Preceded by: Multi-member district
- Succeeded by: Multi-member district

Personal details
- Born: 30 March 1940 (age 86) Woopen, Prussia, Germany (now Cheryomukhovo, Kaliningrad Oblast, Russia)
- Party: Alternative for Germany (from 2013)
- Other political affiliations: Christian Democratic Union (1969–2011)
- Children: 6
- Police career
- Allegiance: West Germany
- Branch: Bundesgrenzschutz
- Service years: 1960–1968

Wilhelm von Gottberg (born 30 March 1940) is a German far-right politician of the Alternative for Germany party who served as a member of the Bundestag from 2017 to 2021, representing Lower Saxony. Gottberg is a Holocaust denier and former president of the Landsmannschaft Ostpreußen, and has advocated for the resettlement of Kaliningrad Oblast with Germans.

== Biography ==
Wilhelm von Gottberg was born on 30 March 1940 in Woopen, then in East Prussia (now Cheryomukhovo, Kaliningrad Oblast, Russia). He is the son of Hans Heinrich von Gottberg (1900–1973) and his wife Gertrud, née Freiin von der Goltz (1908–1997). He was descended of two noble families, the Gottberg family and the Von der Goltz family. Gottberg's family was expelled from East Prussia following the end of World War II. He subsequently lived in Swinemünde (now Świnoujście, in Poland) and later in West Germany. After completing mandatory military service, he served in the Bundesgrenzschutz from 1960 to 1968. In 1969, he joined the Christian Democratic Union due to the party's rejection of the Oder–Neisse line.

Gottberg is president of the Landsmannschaft Ostpreußen (since 1992) and Vice President of the Federation of Expellees (since 1992) in Germany. He is also a member of the board of the Ostpreußische Kulturstiftung, and was mayor of Schnega in Lower Saxony. Gottberg used to be a member of the Christian Democratic Union, but left the party in 2011 amidst a dispute over his position on the CDU's electoral list in Schnega's municipal election. He joined Alternative for Germany (German: Alternative für Deutschland, AfD) in 2013, supporting the party's position on the Euro area crisis. Gottberg's joining the AfD made him the first mayor from the party.

He ran in the 2017 German federal election on the AfD list from Lower Saxony and was elected, making him the oldest member of the Bundestag. This would have made him president by right of age, in charge of chairing the opening session. However, prior to the elections the Bundestag had changed its procedures, instead the right would go to the member with the longest-serving member of the Bundestag, who at the time was Wolfgang Schäuble of CDU, two years Gottberg's junior.

== Political positions ==
German newspaper Die Zeit has described Gottberg as far-right, and part of the AfD's furthest right faction, associated with the Identitarian movement. He is known for his Holocaust denial, referring to the Holocaust as "a myth". American magazine The Atlantic, British newspaper The Guardian and Reuters reported that the decision to change procedures for selecting the president by right of age had been made due to Gottberg's Holocaust denial, though this was denied by CDU politician Volker Kauder, who argued that changes to the procedure had been in development prior to the 2017 election. Gottberg has quoted Italian neo-fascist Mario Consoli in his writings.

Gottberg has called for the resettlement of Germans in East Prussia, arguing in 1998 that German citizens should be given visa-free travel and rights to buy property in Kaliningrad Oblast, that bilingual signs in German should be erected and that Germans be given "ethnic autonomy". He has demanded that the governments of Poland, Czechia and Russia apologise for the expulsion of Germans, referring to it as a genocide. Gottberg supported the presidency of Boris Yeltsin after Yeltsin refused to prevent the return of 200,000 ethnic Germans to Kaliningrad in late 1991, and, like other members of the Landsmannschaft Ostpreußen, favoured the establishment of a German republic of Russia in Kaliningrad Oblast.

== Literature ==
Jens Mecklenburg (Hrsg.): Handbuch deutscher Rechtsextremismus. Elefanten-Press, Berlin 1996, ISBN 3-88520-585-8, S. 462–463.
