= The Munich Eye =

English-language weekly newspaper in Germany

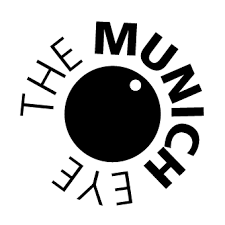
- Type: Weekly newspaper
- Format: Broadsheet
- Owner(s): William Smyth
- Publisher: The Eye Newspapers
- Editor-in-chief: William Smyth
- Founded: July 2012
- Language: English
- Headquarters: Munich
- Country: Germany
- Sister newspapers: The Germany Eye; The Madrid Eye; The Canary Eye; The Russia Eye; The Brazil Eye; The Tokyo Eye; Buenos Aires Eye; The Barcelona Eye
- Website: The Munich Eye

The Munich Eye is an English language weekly newspaper based in Munich, Germany. It serves the English-speaking community in Munich and the wider Bavarian region, offering news, sports coverage, and cultural insights.

== History and development ==
The newspaper was first published on 5 July 2012. Originally titled The Munich Times, it was later rebranded as The Munich Eye. It is published every Thursday and is staffed by native English-speaking journalists and editors living in Germany.

The newspaper is part of The Eye Newspapers, a global network of English-language publications.

== Content and coverage ==
The Munich Eye provides a mix of local, national, and international news, including:

- International & National News – Coverage of global affairs and German politics.
- Sports Coverage – Including Bundesliga football, with a focus on Bayern Munich.
- Culture & Lifestyle – Reporting on local events, festivals, and entertainment.
- Daily Digital Updates – The newspaper's website is updated regularly with breaking news and features.

== Affiliated publications ==
The Munich Eye is part of the Eye Newspapers network, which operates multiple English-language news platforms worldwide, including:

- The Germany Eye
- The Madrid Eye
- The Canary Eye
- The Russia Eye
- The Brazil Eye
- The Tokyo Eye
- Buenos Aires Eye
- The Barcelona Eye
