= Pommersche Landsmannschaft =

Organization of German refugees expelled from Pomerania after WWII

The Pommersche Landsmannschaft ("Territorial Association of Pomeranians", "Homeland Association of Pomeranians") is an organization of German refugees expelled from their homes in Pomerania after World War II.

== See also ==
- Expulsion of Germans after World War II
- Federation of Expellees
- Flight and expulsion of Germans (1944–1950)
- Pomerania
