= Landsmannschaft der Deutschen aus Russland =

Voluntary association of German refugees expelled from Russia

The Landsmannschaft der Deutschen aus Russland ("Homeland Association of Germans from Russia" or "Territorial Association of Germans from Russia") is an organization of German refugees expelled from their homes in Russia to West Germany after World War II.

Founded in 1950, the organization is based in Stuttgart.

== See also ==
- Expulsion of Germans after World War II
- Federation of Expellees
- Flight and expulsion of Germans (1944–1950)
