= Karpatendeutsche Landsmannschaft Slowakei =

The Karpatendeutsche Landsmannschaft Slowakei (English: Carpathian German Homeland Association Slovakia) is an organization of German refugees expelled from their homes in Slovakia after World War II. The organization is based in Stuttgart, and it was founded in 1949.

== See also ==
- Expulsion of Germans after World War II
- Federation of Expellees
- Flight and expulsion of Germans (1944–1950)
