= Landsmannschaft Westpreußen =

Association of Germans expelled from West Prussia

The Landsmannschaft Westpreußen ("Territorial Association of West Prussia", "Homeland Association of West Prussia") is an organization of Heimatvertriebene — Germans born in West Prussia, or their descendants, who either fled or were expelled to the Federal Republic of Germany during the Expulsion of Germans after World War II.

The organization was founded on 6 April 1949 and is based in Münster, North Rhine-Westphalia. Its current president is Mrs. Sibylle Dreher, and CDU politician Mrs. Erika Steinbach is a notable member. The Landsmannschaft is a member of the Federation of Expellees.

== See also ==
- Evacuation of East Prussia
