= Preußische Allgemeine Zeitung =

German weekly newspaper

- Type: Weekly newspaper
- Owner: Landsmannschaft Ostpreußen
- Publisher: Landsmannschaft Ostpreußen
- Editor-in-chief: Jan Heitmann
- Founded: 1 April 1950
- Relaunched: 2008
- Political alignment: "Prussian Conservative"
- Language: German
- Headquarters: Hamburg
- ISSN: 0947-9597
- Website: Preußische Allgemeine Zeitung

The Preußische Allgemeine Zeitung (PAZ) is a German weekly newspaper published by the Landsmannschaft Ostpreußen. It was previously called the Ostpreußenblatt and was aimed mainly at German post-war expellees from parts of Central and Eastern Europe. The Ostpreußenblatt was first published in April 1950. The readership of the Ostpreußenblatt was aging, so in 2003, in an attempt to discard the image of an internal newsletter and thus gain new readers, it was renamed Preußische Allgemeine Zeitung.

The Preußische Allgemeine Zeitung states its political alignment to be "Prussian conservative". It has been accused by the journalist Anton Maegerle of providing a platform for extreme right-wing authors. The newspaper itself objected to this association and a description to that effect in a German Wikipedia article, issuing a press release which took issue with this classification and publishing an article in support of their position by the French political scientist and PAZ author Jean-Paul Picaper.
