= Landsmannschaft Weichsel-Warthe Bundesverband =

The Landsmannschaft Weichsel-Warthe Bundesverband is an organization of German refugees expelled from their homes in modern-day Poland after World War II. The organization is based in Wiesbaden, and it was founded in 1949.

== See also ==
- Expulsion of Germans after World War II
- Federation of Expellees
- Flight and expulsion of Germans (1944–1950)
