= Landsmannschaft der Banater Schwaben e.V. =

Organisation of Swabians expelled from Banat, Romania after WWII

The Landsmannschaft der Banater Schwaben e.V. ("Territorial Association of Banat Swabians", "Homeland Association of Banat Swabians") is an organization of German Banat Swabians refugees expelled from their homes in Banat, Romania after World War II.

The organization is based in Munich, and it was founded in 1950.

== See also ==
- Expulsion of Germans after World War II
- Federation of Expellees
- Flight and expulsion of Germans (1944–1950)
- Banat Swabians
