= Landsmannschaft der Buchenlanddeutschen =

The Landsmannschaft der Buchenlanddeutschen (i.e. "Territorial Association of Bukovina Germans" or "Homeland Association of Bukovina Germans") was an organization of German refugees expelled from their homes in Bukovina and Bessarabia after World War II. These groups of ethnic Germans are collectively known as Bukovina Germans (German: Buchenlanddeutschen or Bukowinadeutschen) and Bessarabia Germans (German: Bessarabiendeutschen) respectively. It ceased its activity in 2020. The organization was based in the city of Augsburg, Swabia, Bavaria, south-eastern Germany, and was founded in 1949.

== See also ==
- Democratic Forum of Germans in Romania
- Association of Transylvanian Saxons in Germany
- Expulsion of Germans after World War II
- Federation of Expellees
- Soviet occupation of Bessarabia and northern Bukovina
- Germans of Romania
- Zipser Germans
