= Deutsch-Baltische Gesellschaft =

The Deutsch-Baltische Gesellschaft ("German-Baltic Society") is an organization which represents Baltic German refugees expelled from Estonia and Latvia during World War II and its aftermath. It was established in 1950 as the Deutsch-Baltische Landsmannschaft im Bundesgebiet.

The organization is based in Darmstadt, Hesse. Its youth organization is the Deutschbaltischer Jugend- und Studentenring.

== Society Chairman ==
- Georg von Manteuffel-Szoege (1950-1962)
- Axel de Vries (1962-1963 comm.)
- Erik von Sivers (1963-1973)
- Rudolf von Wistinghausen (1973-1980)
- Klas Lackschewitz (1980-1984)
- Hans Erich Seuberlich (1984)
- Runar of Sivers (1985-1989)
- Waltraut Dame von Tiesenhausen (1989-1996)
- Heinz-Adolf Treu (1996-2005)
- Eckhart Neander (2005-2010)
- Frank von Auer (2010-2015)
- Christian von Boetticher (since October 31, 2015)

== Corporate members ==
- Carl-Schirren-Gesellschaft e. V. - German-Baltic cultural work
- German Baltic youth and student ring e. V.
- German Baltic Studienstiftung
- German-Baltic Genealogical Society (DBGG)
- German-Baltic church service eV (auxiliary committee of the ev.-luth. Deutschbalten)
- Baltic monuments eV

== See also ==
- Nazi–Soviet population transfers
- Flight and expulsion of Germans (1944–1950)
- Federation of Expellees
- All-German Bloc/League of Expellees and Deprived of Rights
