= Landsmannschaft der Bessarabiendeutschen =

Organisation of expelled Bessarabia Germans

The Landsmannschaft der Bessarabiendeutschen ("Territorial Association of Bessarabia Germans", "Homeland Association of Bessarabia Germans") is an organization of Bessarabia German refugees expelled from their homes after World War II.

The organization is based in Stuttgart, and it was founded in 1949.

== See also ==
- Expulsion of Germans after World War II
- Federation of Expellees
- Flight and expulsion of Germans (1944–1950)
- Soviet occupation of Bessarabia and northern Bukovina
- Bessarabia Germans
