= Kazdanga =

Village in Latvia

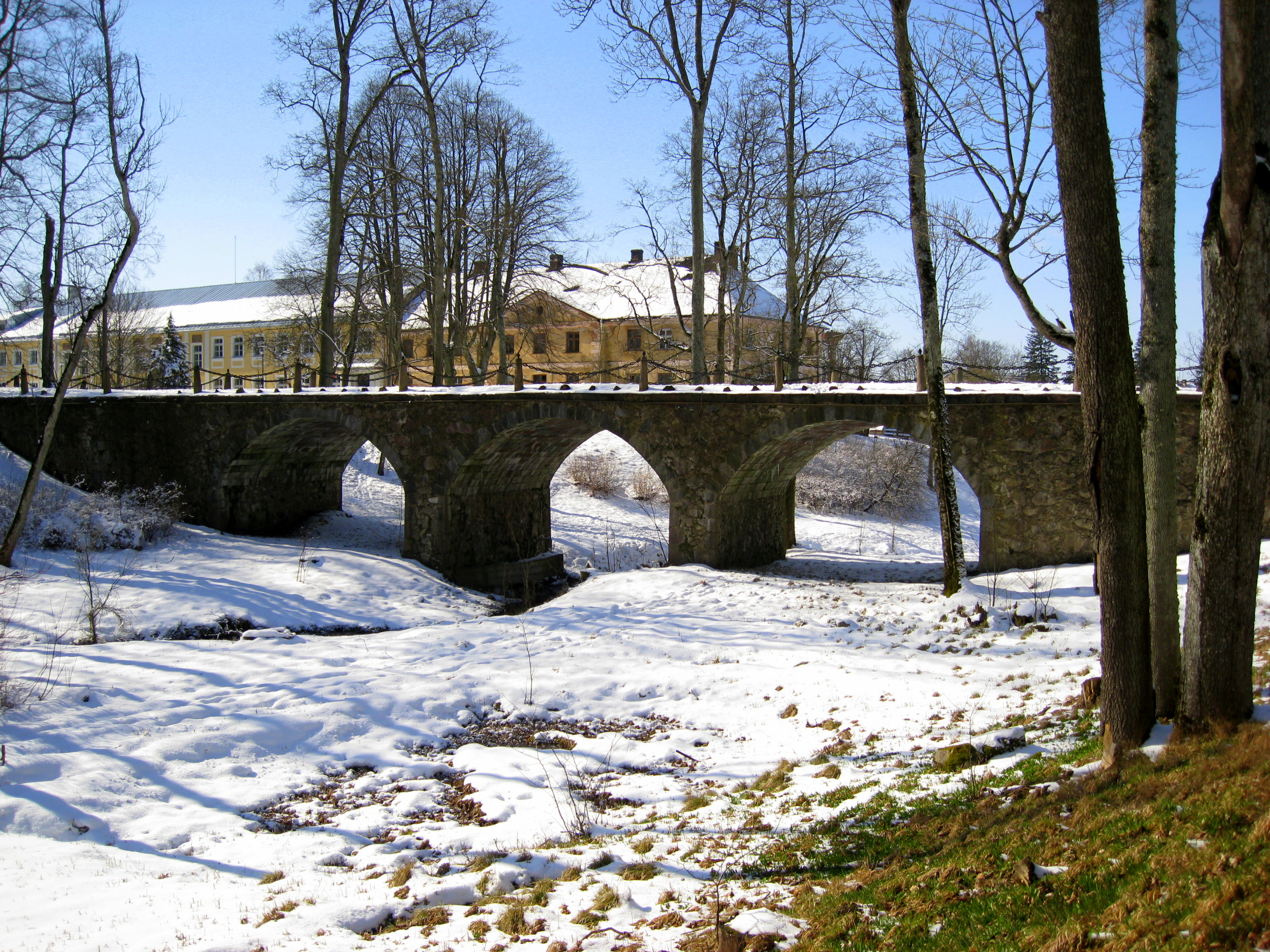
Stone bridge in Kazdanga

Kazdanga (German: Katzdangen) is a larger village, (Note: Lielciems, "larger village", in Latvian classification) the administrative center of the Kazdanga Parish of South Kurzeme Municipality in the Courland region of Latvia. As of 2022 its population is 527.

It is located in the northern part of the parish on the banks of the Alokste river, which is dammed within the extents of the village to form an artificial reservoir known as the Kazdanga Mill Lake (Kazdangas dzirnavezers) by which there is a water mill.

The modern settlement grew around the Kazdanga manor (burned down during the Russian Revolution of 1905. Currently the Kazdanga Palace, an architectural monument of national importance, is the place of interest in the village. The adjacent village of Valāta forms a common settlement conglomerate with Kazdanga.

The P117 regional motorway runs across Kazdanga.

There is an archaeological site of national importance, the Kazdanga (Valata) Hillfort north of Valata (56.70865°N 21.74071°E).
