= Landsmannschaft Ostpreußen =

Organisation of Germans expelled from East Prussia

Homeland Association of East Prussia
- Landsmannschaft Ostpreußen
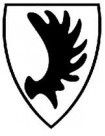
- Website: https://ostpreussen.de/

The Landsmannschaft Ostpreußen ("Homeland Association of East Prussia") is a non-profit organization for Germans who were evacuated or expelled from East Prussia during World War II and as well as people who emigrated in more recent times, exercising their right to German citizenship, based on a 1913 German law. It was formed on 3 October 1948 by East Prussian refugees in West Germany.

== History ==
In the years following the fall of the Berlin Wall and the peaceful revolution in East Germany in 1989/90, the East Prussian Association, often in cooperation with the Lazarus Relief Organization or the Johanniter Accident Assistance, established 21 social service centers with clothing banks and pharmacies in the part of East Prussia that now belongs to Poland. During this time, it organized and financed numerous aid transports for hospitals, children's homes, and retirement homes, supported wolf children, especially in Lithuania, as well as kindergartens and schools, including through school meals; however, these activities have receded into the background in recent years due to Poland's economic development.

Through its Bruderhilfe social welfare organization, founded in 1951, the LO continues to support East Prussians who remained in their homeland and are in need with an annual financial contribution. Since 2000, German-Polish municipal policy congresses have been held to promote dialogue between the former and current inhabitants of the Warmia-Masuria region (southern East Prussia).

In 2026, the Landsmannschaft Ostpreußen was declared an undesirable organization in Russia.

== Organisation ==
The organization's current president is Stephan Grigat. Its seat is in Hamburg, and it is a member of the Bund der Vertriebenen. Its official newspaper is the Preußische Allgemeine Zeitung. The Bund Junges Ostpreußen is a subsidiary youth organization of the Landsmannschaft Ostpreußen; its predecessor, Junge Landsmannschaft Ostdeutschland, was disassociated from the parent organization in 2000.

== Presidency ==
- 1948–1951: Ottomar Schreiber
- 1952–1966: Alfred Gille
- 1966–1971: Reinhold Rehs
- 1971–1974: Joachim Freiherr von Braun
- 1974–1979: Hans-Georg Bock
- 1979–1990: Ottfried Hennig
- 1990–1992: Harry Poley
- 1992–2010: Wilhelm von Gottberg
- 6 November 2010 – present: Stephan Grigat
