= Landsmannschaft der Deutschen aus Litauen =

Post-WW2 organization for displaced German refugees

The Landsmannschaft der Deutschen aus Litauen ("Territorial Association of Germans from Lithuania", "Homeland Association of Germans from Lithuania") is an organization of German refugees expelled from their homes in Lithuania to West Germany after World War II.

The organization is based in Leonberg, Baden-Württemberg. The Bundesvorsitzender (chairman) is Hardy Mett.

== See also ==
- Expulsion of Germans after World War II
- Flight and expulsion of Germans (1944–1950)
