= Landsmannschaft Schlesien =

The Landsmannschaft Schlesien - Nieder und Oberschlesien e.V. ("Territorial Association of Silesia - Lower and Upper Silesia", "Homeland Association of Silesia - Lower and Upper Silesia") is an organization of Germans born in the former Prussian provinces of Lower and Upper Silesia, and their descendants, who currently live in Germany. The Landsmannschaft Schlesien was established in March 1950 and is a member of the Federation of Expellees, and has its headquarters in Königswinter, North Rhine-Westphalia.

== About ==
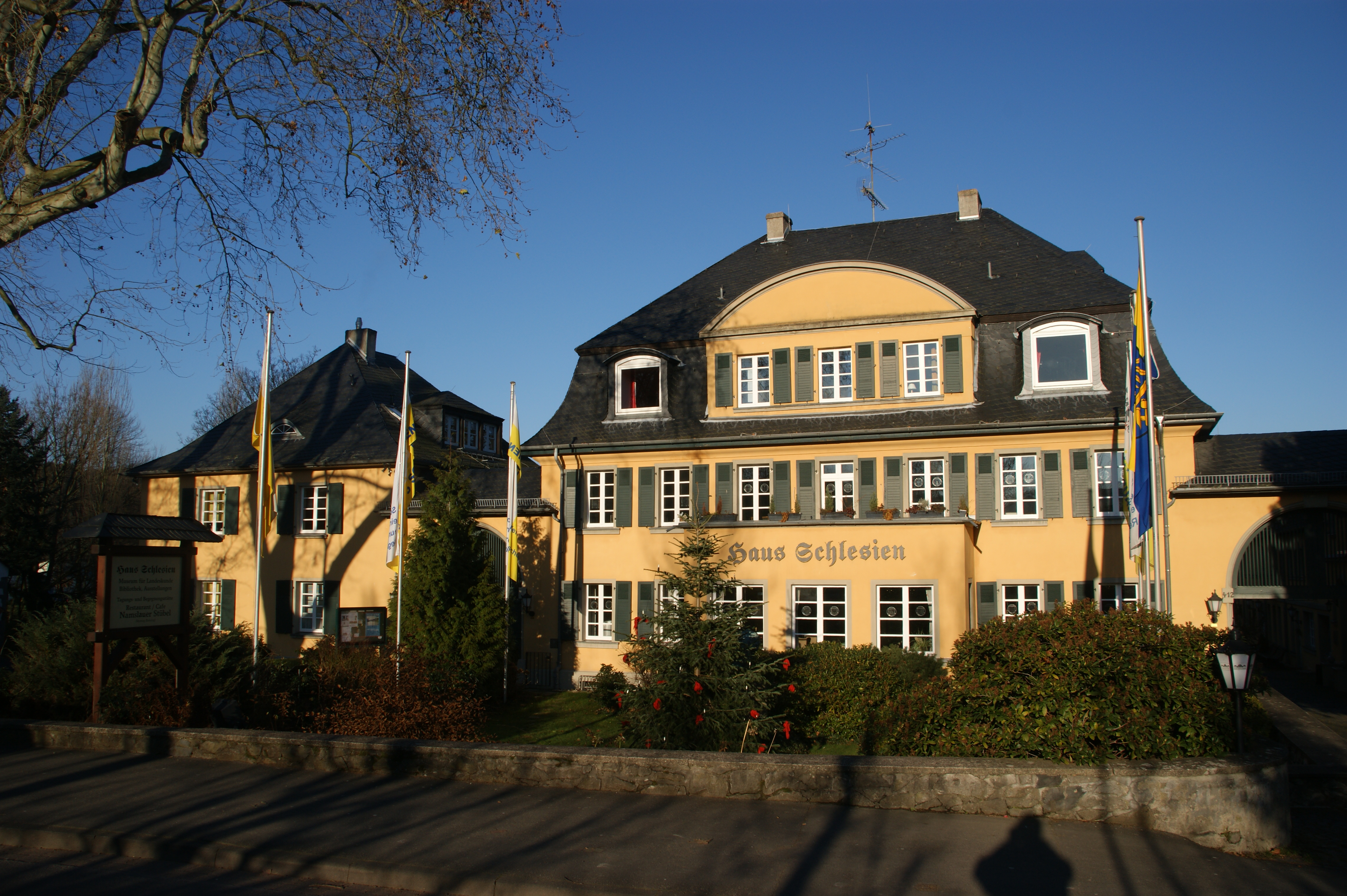
Haus Schlesien in Heisterbacherrott, Königswinter, Rhein-Sieg District

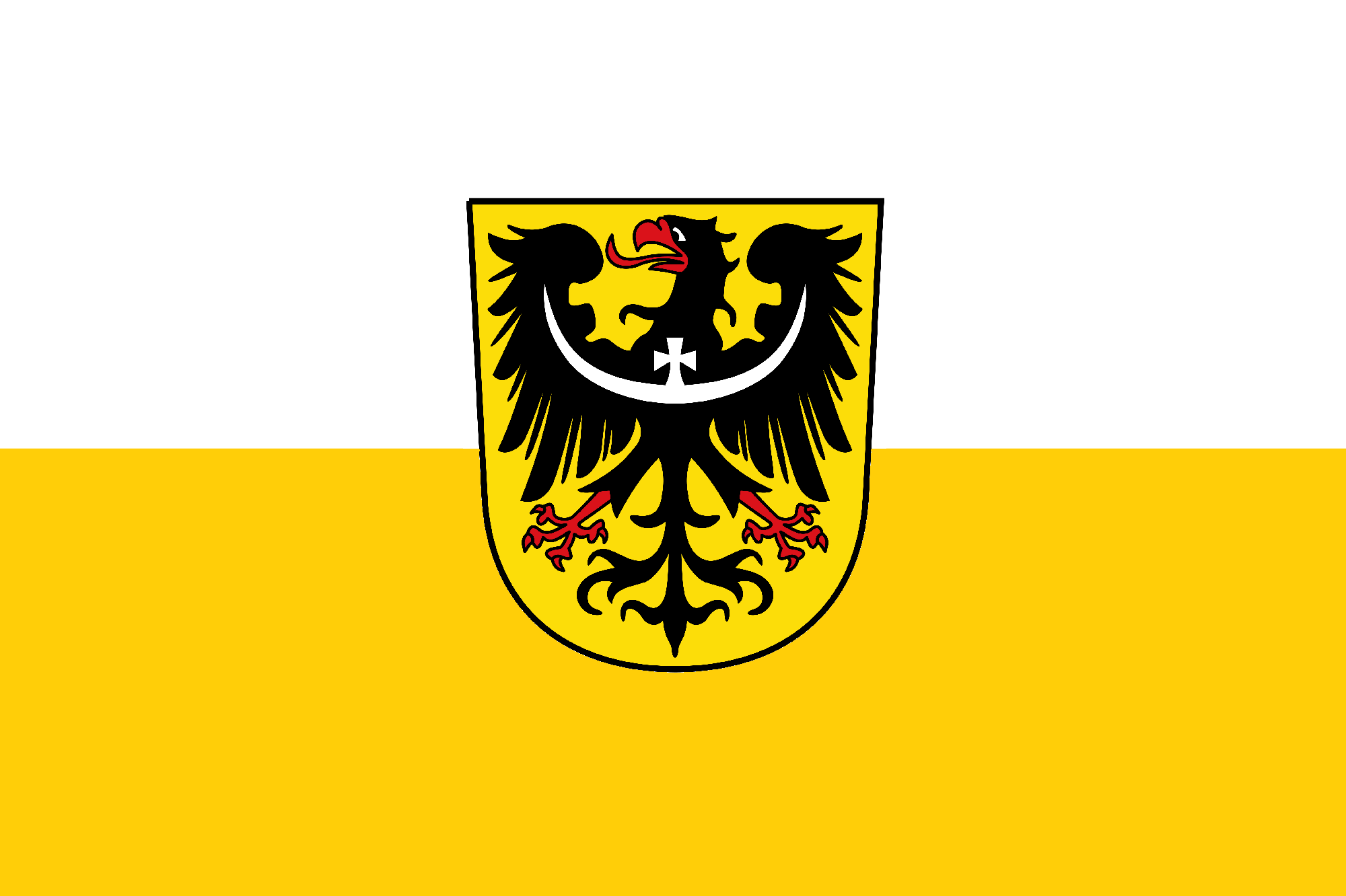
Flag of Silesia and Lower Silesia

Flag of Upper Silesia, version without an eagle

The association consists of people who were expelled or evacuated during World War II or after, and their descendants, as well as people who emigrated in more recent times, exercising their right to German citizenship, based on a 1913 German law. (See Aussiedler, the German Law of Return.) (The German nationality law was reformed in 1999 to, besides other matters, remove reference to ethnic German ancestry from the law.)

The current president is Stephan Rauhut who is a German Christian Democratic Union politician. He succeeded Rudi Pawelka on 9 November 2013, who had succeeded Herbert Hupka, the president from 1968 to 2000. All these presidents have been CDU members. According to the association, the Landsmannschaft currently has about 200,000 members nationwide. Until 1988, Der Schlesier (The Silesian) was the main organ of the Landsmannschaft.

In 1985, the Landsmannschaft planned to hold a congress in Stuttgart under the motto 40 Jahre Vertreibung - Schlesien bleibt unser ("40 years of expulsion - Silesia remains ours"). Chancellor Helmut Kohl declined to attend unless the slogan was modified, which it was, to "Silesia remains our future in a Europe of free nations". At the 2001 congress held in Nuremberg, Interior Minister Otto Schily was booed when he said that the expulsions were the consequence of German aggression.

There is also another Silesian Landsmannschaft, the Landsmannschaft der Oberschlesier e.V. (Bundesverband) representing Upper Silesians.

== Presidents of the Federation ==
The presidents of the Federation since its founding have been:

- 1950–1952: Walter Rinke
- 1952–1953: Karl Hausdorff
- 1953–1954: Walter Rinke
- 1954–1955: Julius Doms
- 1955–1968: Erich Schellhaus
- 1968–2000: Herbert Hupka
- 2000–2013: Rudi Pawelka
- 2013- : Stephan Rauhut

== Schlesische Jugend ==
The youth organization of the Landsmannschaft, the Schlesische Jugend, was founded in 1948. Its aim is to preserve the heritage of Silesia with its culture and landscapes. The focus of the work of the Schlesische Jugend is cultural and political education. The Schlesische Jugend was accused of links with the right-wing Junge Landsmannschaft Ostdeutschland, and also to the extreme right-wing National Democratic Party of Germany which led in 2011 to its exclusion from the Landsmannschaft. A Divisional Court reversed the exclusion on 1 February 2012 as invalid, but the National Executive Board of the Landsmannschaft renewed the exclusion on 10 March 2012.

== See also ==
- Evacuation of East Prussia
