= Kazdanga Palace =

Palace in Latvia

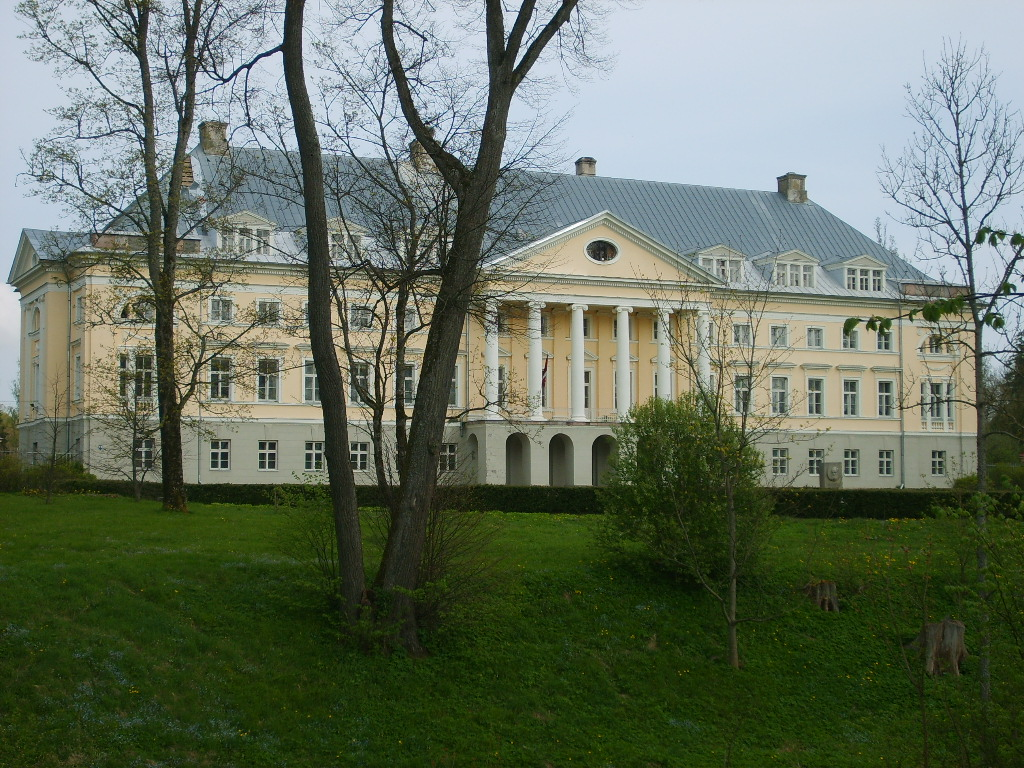

- Location within Latvia

General information
- Architectural style: Classicism
- Location: Kazdanga Parish, South Kurzeme Municipality, Latvia
- Coordinates: 56°44′02″N 21°43′57″E
- Construction started: 1800
- Completed: 1804
- Client: von Manteuffel family

Design and construction
- Architect: Johann Gottfried Adam Berlitz

Kazdanga Palace is located in the village Kazdanga (Polish and German Katzdangen), Kazdanga Parish, South Kurzeme Municipality, in the Courland region of Latvia. The first manor house was made out of wood and the new palace was built in 1800–1804 in the late classical style, designed according to the project by the German architect J. G. Berlitz. Kazdanga established the first Latvian fish pond, now in operation for a number of important agricultural schools.

== History ==
The palace was built in the years 1800–1804 in the style of late classicism, built by the project of Johann Gottfried Adam Berlitz. There is a stone bridge leading to the palace. On the other side of the river there are remnants of the manor buildings; house of the servants, stables, house of the steward and barns. The palace was burned down by local peasants during the Revolution of 1905. However, German baron von Manteuffel renovated it by the project of Paul Schultze-Naumburg in 1907. The renovation of the Kazdanga palace became an important event for the development of the Neo-Classicism style. It was designed by the well known German architect and Neo-Classicism Paul Schultze-Naumburg. In contrast to scenic, borrowed forms, the architect declared a return to the Homeland tradition and accuracy.

The reconstruction of the Kazdanga palace demonstrated a new approach by the architect to the original image of the building. The palace, designed in about 1800, was one of the most splendid monuments of Classicism architecture in Courland. Its restoration served as a starting point for reevaluating both patterns of pure Classicism and local building traditions. Even elements of scientific restoration could be observed in the course of reconstruction. The principle of historical verity was important in designing the interiors and replicas of the furniture that had been destroyed.

During the First World War the palace was again devastated. It was rebuilt between 1925 and 1927. In 1930 the Kazdanga Agricultural Trade School was housed in the palace. The school is still situated there. Near to the palace is a house of chevaliers. It has a well-preserved interior, like baroque-style stairs and ornamented parquet floor.

== See also ==
- List of palaces and manor houses in Latvia
