= Linus Kather =

German politician (1893–1983)

Member of the Bundestag
- In office 7 September 1949 – 6 October 1957

Personal details
- Born: 22 September 1893
- Died: 10 March 1983 (aged 89)
- Party: CDU

Linus Kather (22 September 1893 – 10 March 1983) was a German politician of the Christian Democratic Union (CDU) and former member of the German Bundestag.

== Life ==
From 1946 to 1949 Kather was a member of the Hamburg Bürgerschaft. In 1947/48 he was a member of the zone advisory council of the British occupation zone. Kather was a member of the Bundestag from the first federal election in 1949 to 1957.

== Literature ==
Herbst, Ludolf; Jahn, Bruno (2002). Vierhaus, Rudolf (ed.). Biographisches Handbuch der Mitglieder des Deutschen Bundestages. 1949–2002 [Biographical Handbook of the Members of the German Bundestag. 1949–2002] (in German). München: De Gruyter - De Gruyter Saur. p. 1715. ISBN 978-3-11-184511-1.
