= Landsmannschaft der Deutschen aus Ungarn =

Organisation of ethnic Germans expelled from Hungary

The Landsmannschaft der Deutschen aus Ungarn or Homeland Society of Germans from Hungary ("Homeland Association of Germans from Hungary") is an organization which represents ethnic German refugees expelled from their homes in Hungary to western Germany during World War II and its aftermath.

The organization is based in Munich, Bavaria. Its Bundesvorsitzender (chairman) is Dr. Friedrich A. Zimmermann.

== See also ==
- Flight and expulsion of Germans (1944–1950)
