= German–Soviet population transfers =

Mass population transfers, 1939 to 1941

The German–Soviet population transfers were population transfers of ethnic Germans, ethnic Poles, and some ethnic East Slavs that took place from 1939 to 1941. These transfers were part of the German Heim ins Reich policy in accordance with the German–Soviet Frontier Treaty between Nazi Germany and the Soviet Union.

== Conception ==
As a result of Nazi Germany's expansion, most German speakers in Europe were brought under one regime. However, there were millions of ethnic Germans living outside German borders, mostly in Central and Eastern Europe, with the majority of these people being the descendants of German migrants to Russia. These Germans – referred to as Volksdeutsche – had lived outside of Germany for centuries, having settled in the lands to the east between the 12th and 18th centuries.

Adolf Hitler had a plan to attract these German-speaking people into Nazi Germany. However, he also believed that the 1937 borders and territories of Nazi Germany, i.e. before the Anschluss (annexation) of Austria and the Sudetenland, were inadequate to accommodate this large increase in population.

At this time, propaganda for more Lebensraum, or living space, grew fast.

== Legal basis ==
With the largest number of ethnic Germans living in Russia, Hitler knew that he could not resettle all these people without the full cooperation of Joseph Stalin and the Soviet Union. In late August 1939 (a week before the invasion of Poland and the start of World War II in Europe), Hitler sent his foreign minister Joachim von Ribbentrop to Moscow to arrange a pact of non-aggression with the Soviet Union. This became known as the Molotov–Ribbentrop Pact. Hitler's aim was to avoid having to fight on two fronts upon the invasion of Poland and best facilitate its successful capture by partition, a crucial matter in the first weeks of the Second World War.

The real issues agreed upon in the pact were the partition of territories in Central and Eastern Europe into German and Soviet spheres of influence and the reciprocal transfer of ethnic German and Russian people to their native countries.

Hitler's plan was to invade western Poland (having assigned the eastern part to the Soviet Union in the pact) and then force all non-German people (mostly Polish citizens) out of their homes and either use them for forced labour or move them to the General Government area. Once these territories were free of non-Germans, the population transfers could begin with ethnic Germans settling in the homes of the expropriated Polish.

== Population transfers 1939–1944 ==
The planned transfers were first announced to the ethnic Germans and the general public in October 1939.

The Nazis set out to encourage the return of the ethnic Germans (called Volksdeutsche by the Nazis), from the Baltic States by the use of propaganda. This included using scare tactics about the Soviet Union and led to tens of thousands of Germans leaving. Those who left were not referred to as refugees, but were rather described as answering the call of the Führer. To encourage support of this program, later German propaganda films such as The Red Terror and Frisians in Peril depicted the ethnic Germans as deeply persecuted in their native lands.

Families were transported by sea from the Baltic States and by train from other territories. The German government arranged for the transfer of their furniture and personal belongings. All immovable property was sold, with the money being collected by the Nazis and not given back to the families. This was an intentional act designed to disconnect the displaced people from their former homeland. The value of the real estate left behind was to be compensated in cash and Polish property in occupied Poland.

The transported ethnic Germans were initially kept in camps for racial evaluation, to prevent intermixing with the native German population. There they were divided into groups: A (Altreich), who were to be settled in Germany and allowed no farms or businesses (to allow for closer watch), S (Sonderfall), who were used as forced, and unpaid workers, and O (Ost-Fälle), the best classification, to be settled in the 'Eastern Wall'—the occupied regions to protect Germans from the East—and allowed independence. This last group, after spending some time in refugee camps in Germany, were eventually brought to Polish areas annexed by Nazi Germany and to Zamość County, as decided by the Generalplan Ost. The deportation orders required that enough Polish people be removed to provide space for every settler, e.g. if twenty Nazi, German bakers were sent, twenty Polish bakers were removed. The settlers were often given Polish homes where the families had been evicted so quickly that half-eaten meals remained on the tables and small children had been taken from unmade beds. Members of the Hitler Youth and the League of German Girls were assigned the task of overseeing these evictions to ensure that the Polish left behind most of their belongings for the use of the settlers. Once they were settled, the process of Germanization was begun.

Ethnic Germans were evacuated from territories occupied by the Soviets in 1940, notably Bessarabia and the Baltic States of Estonia and Latvia, all of which traditionally had large ethnic German minorities. However, the majority of the Baltic Germans had already been resettled in late 1939, prior to the occupation of Estonia and Latvia by the Soviets in June 1940. In most cases, they were given farms taken from 110,000 Polish who were expelled from the area.

Ethnic Germans Resettled by Nazi Germany 1939–1944

Ethnic Germans Resettled from	Resettled In	Resettled In	Resettled In	Resettled In	Resettled In	Resettled In	
	Polish areas annexed by Nazi Germany	General Government/Poland	Oder-Neisse region	Danzig	Austria	Czechoslovakia	Total
Territories of Poland annexed by the Soviet Union	56,000	17,000	46,000	—	5,000	—	124,000
Chełm & Narew in Poland	29,000	11,000	2,000	—	—	—	42,000
Baltic States	87,000	—	40,000	—	—	—	127,000
Soviet Union	265,000	35,000	70,000	—	—	—	370,000
Romania	128,000	12,000	52,000	—	20,000	—	212,000
Yugoslavia	10,000	—	10,000	—	15,000	—	35,000
Reichsdeutsche west of the Oder–Neisse Line	—	290,000	225,000	15,000	—	30,000	560,000
Reichsdeutsche east of the Oder–Neisse Line	—	380,000	—	—	—	30,000	410,000
Total	575,000	745,000	445,000	15,000	40,000	60,000	1,880,000

Source: Reichling, Gerhard (1995). Die deutschen Vertriebenen in Zahlen [German Expellees in Figures] (in German). Vol. Teil 1. Bonn: Kulturstiftung der Deutschen Vertriebenen. pp. 23–27. ISBN 3-88557-046-7.

Reichling's figures do not include parts of the more than 200,000 ethnic Germans from Yugoslavia who fled in the autumn of 1944 and who were directed into the General Government. It is not known how many actually arrived there.

== Sources ==
- Schechtman, Joseph B. European Population Transfers, 1939–1945.
- Angelus, Oskar (1939). Eestist saksamaale ümberasunute nimestik : Verzeichnis der aus Estland nach Deutschland Umgesiedelten [List of people who resettled from Estonia to Germany] (in Estonian). Tallinn.
- Izceļojušo vācu tautības pilsoņu saraksts [The list of resettled citizens of German ethnicity] (in Latvian). 1940.
- Łossowski, Piotr; Bronius Makauskas (2005). Kraje bałtyckie w latach przełomu 1934–1944 (in Polish). Scientific Editor Andrzej Koryna. Warszawa: Instytut Historii PAN; Fundacja Pogranicze. ISBN 83-88909-42-8.
