= Sudetendeutsche Landsmannschaft =

Voluntary association

Flag of the Sudeten, used by Sudetendeutsche Landsmannschaft

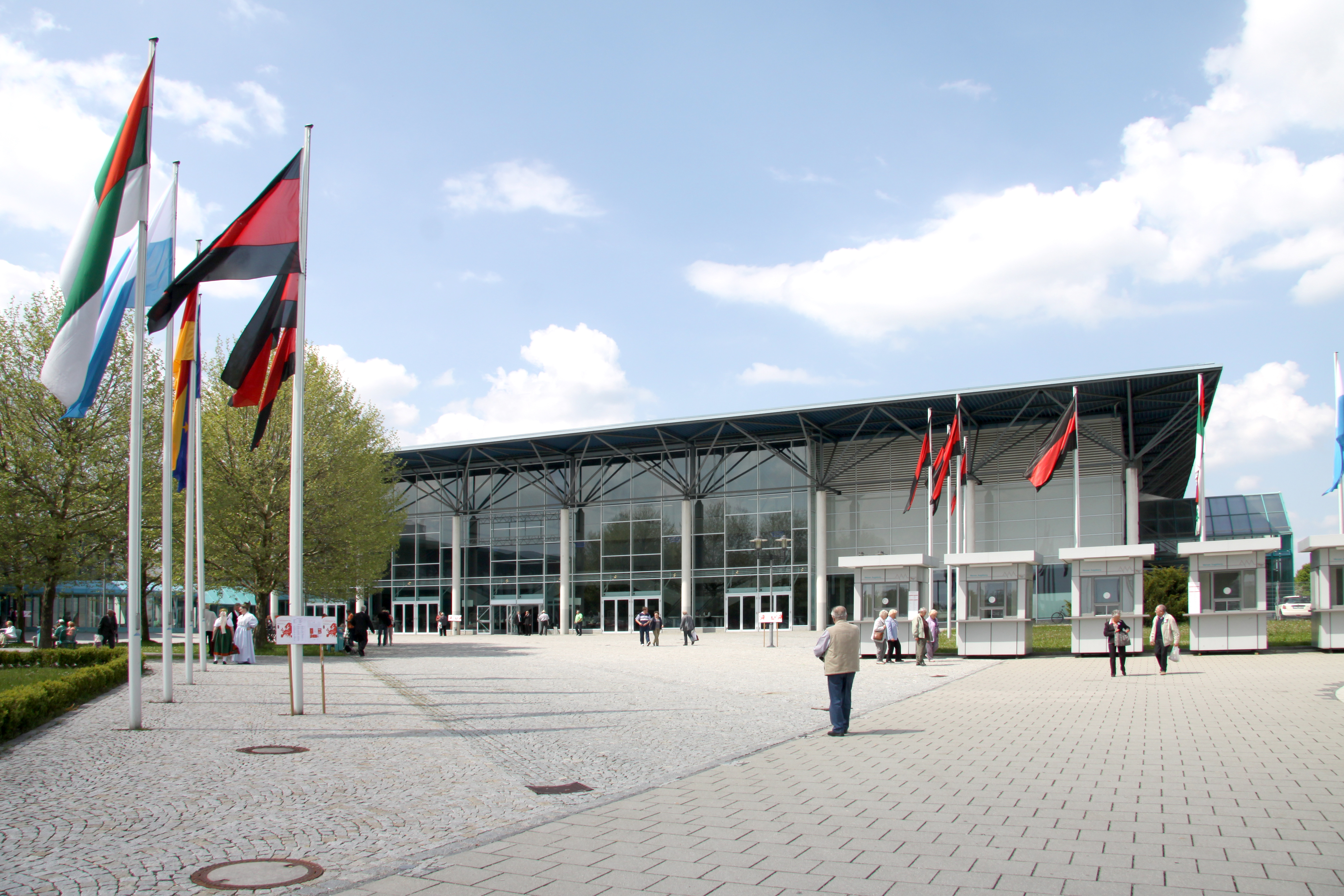
Traditional convention of Sudeten German refugees (Sudetendeutscher Tag), arranged by Sudetendeutsche Landsmannschaft, 2010 in Augsburg

The Sudetendeutsche Landsmannschaft (English: Sudeten German Homeland Association; Czech: Sudetoněmecké krajanské sdružení) is an organization representing Sudeten German expellees and refugees from the Sudetenland in Czechoslovakia. Most of them were forcibly expelled and deported to western Allied occupation zones of Germany, which would later form West Germany, from their homelands inside Czechoslovakia during the expulsion of Germans after World War II. Many settled in Bavaria.

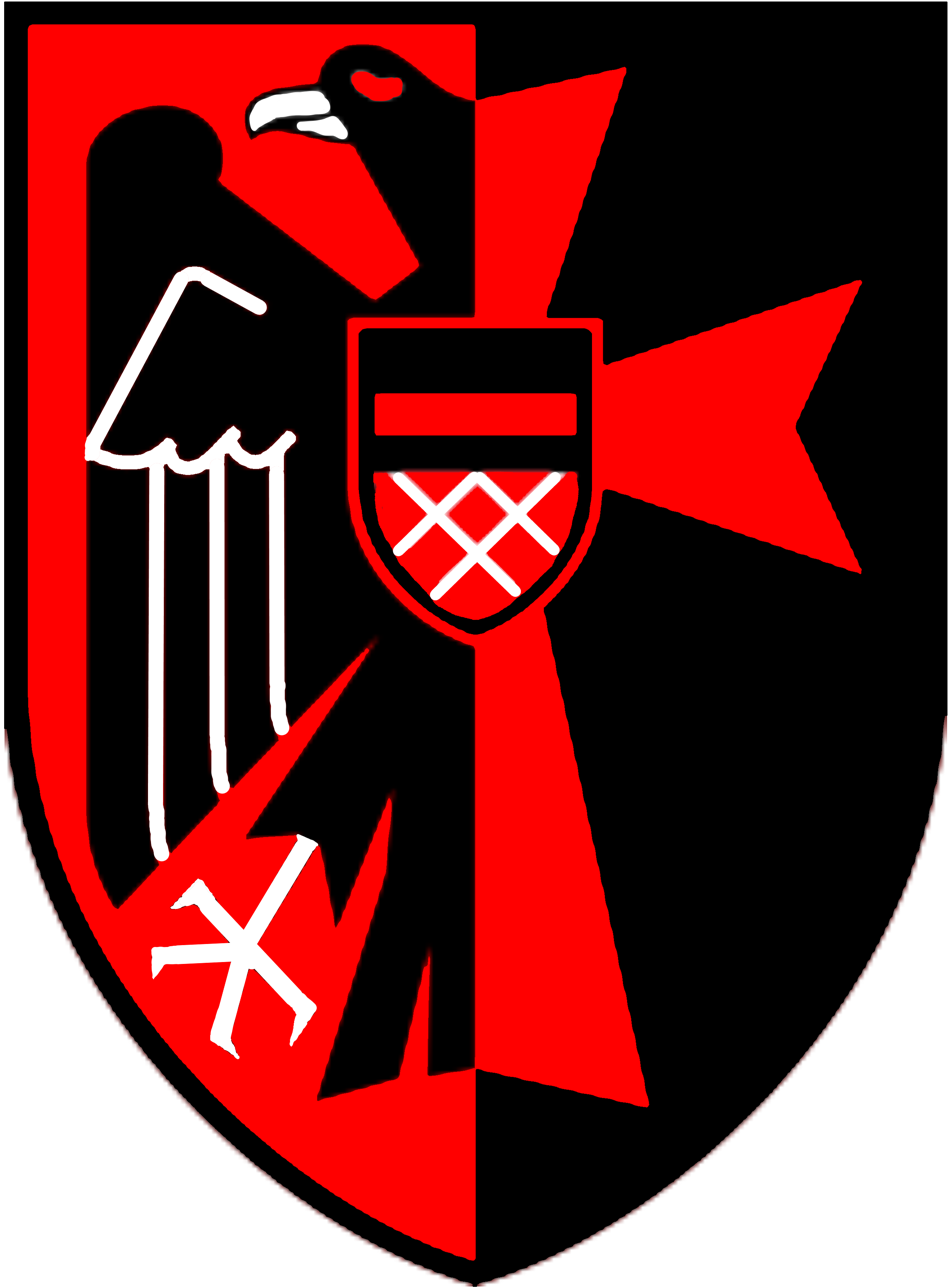
Coat of arms of Sudetendeutsche Landsmannschaft

The charter was signed in Stuttgart in 1950 and committed the organization to the renouncing of revenge and retaliation and promoting European accord. The organization tried to slow down the membership of today's Czech Republic in the European Union by demanding a complete revocation of the Beneš decrees which established the expulsion of Germans from Czechoslovakia after the war and declared them unlawful.

The association is currently based in Munich, Bavaria. Its chairman is Bernd Posselt. It is a member of the Federation of Expellees (Bund der Vertriebenen, BdV). Since Pentecost of 1950, the Landsmannschaft has organized a traditional convention, the Sudetendeutscher Tag, which mostly takes place in southern Germany, in Augsburg or Nuremberg. In 1950 the Homeland Association already vowed to reject any form of violence and revenge.

The association observes the annual Sudeten German Day with a festival celebrating their culture. It also has local and district chapters which undertake various activities, such as developing and taking exhibitions about the expulsion to schools.

In 2024, the Sudetendeutsche Landsmannschaft awarded former European Union president Jean-Claude Juncker its Charlemagne Prize, for his advocacy of a just international order in Central Europe.

== See also ==
- Landsmannschaft (Studentenverbindung)
