= December 31 =

December 31 this year in various calendars
- Thursday, 31 December 2026
Akan	Foyaw
Armenian	14 Arach 1476
Aztec	Huei Tozoztli 10, 5 Calli
Babylonian	21 Kislimu, 2337 SE
Balinese pawukon	Luang, Pepet, Pasah, Sri, Paing, Tungleh, Wraspati of Julungwangi, Ludra, Nohan, Raja
Bengali	16 Poush, BS 1433
Chinese	Yin Earth Rabbit・Well Mansion; Fire Horse Year, Month 11, Day 23 (Dongzhi, 5 days until Xiaohan)
Common Era	31 December 2026 CE
Coptic	22 Koiak, AM 1743
Egyptian	19 Pachon, 2775 NE
Ethiopian	22 Tākḫśāś, 2019 Amätä Məhrät
French Republican	Décade I, Décadi de Nivôse de l'Année 235 de la République
Gregorian	31 December, AD 2026
Hebrew	21 Tevet, AM 5787
Hindu	Hasta・Śobhana; Solar: 16 Pauṣa, 1948 SE; Lunisolar: Aṣṭamī, Kṛishna pakṣa of Mārgaśīrṣa, 2083 VE; Rāudra・5127 KY・1,872,940
Icelandic	Fimmtudagur, 9 Mörsugur 2026
Islamic	21 Rajab, AH 1448 (using tabular method)
ISO week date	2026-W53-4
Japanese	23 Shimotsuki, Reiwa 8 (Tōji, 5 days until Shōkan)
Julian	18 December, AD 2026 (AM 7535)
Julian day	2461406
Korean	23 Jwidal, 4359 DE
Maya	13.0.14.4.3; 16 Kankin, 5 Akbal
Roman	ante diem XV Kalendas Ianuarias, MMDCCLXXX AUC
Solar Hijri	10 Dey, SH 1405
Tibetan	23 mgo, me pho rta 2153 or 1772 or 1000

<<	December					>>
Su	Mo	Tu	We	Th	Fr	Sa
		1	2	3	4	5
6	7	8	9	10	11	12
13	14	15	16	17	18	19
20	21	22	23	24	25	26
27	28	29	30	31
2026

December 31 in recent years
2025 (Wednesday)
2024 (Tuesday)
2023 (Sunday)
2022 (Saturday)
2021 (Friday)
2020 (Thursday)
2019 (Tuesday)
2018 (Monday)
2017 (Sunday)
2016 (Saturday)

December 31 is the 365th day of the year (366th in leap years) in the Gregorian calendar. It is known by a collection of names including: Saint Sylvester's Day, New Year's Eve or Old Year's Day/Night, as the following day is New Year's Day. It is the last day of the year; the following day is January 1, the first day of the following year.

== Events ==
=== Pre-1600 ===
- 406 – Vandals, Alans and Suebians cross the Rhine, beginning an invasion of Gaul.
- 535 – Byzantine general Belisarius completes the conquest of Sicily, defeating the Gothic garrison of Palermo (Panormos), and ending his consulship for the year.
- 870 – Battle of Englefield: The Vikings clash with ealdorman Æthelwulf of Berkshire. The invaders are driven back to Reading (East Anglia); many Danes are killed.
- 1105 – Holy Roman Emperor Henry IV is forced to abdicate in favor of his son, Henry V, in Ingelheim.
- 1225 – The Lý dynasty of Vietnam ends after 216 years by the enthronement of the boy emperor Trần Thái Tông, husband of the last Lý monarch, Lý Chiêu Hoàng, starting the Trần dynasty.
- 1229 – James I the Conqueror, King of Aragon, enters Medina Mayurqa (now known as Palma de Mallorca, Spain), thus consummating the Christian reconquest of the island of Mallorca.
- 1501 – The First Battle of Cannanore commences, seeing the first use of the naval line of battle.
- 1600 – The British East India Company is chartered.

=== 1601–1900 ===
- 1660 – James, Duke of York is named Duke of Normandy by Louis XIV of France.
- 1670 – The expedition of John Narborough leaves Corral Bay, having surveyed the coast and lost four hostages to the Spanish.
- 1687 – The first Huguenots set sail from France to the Cape of Good Hope.
- 1757 – Empress Elizabeth I of Russia issues her ukase incorporating Königsberg into Russia.
- 1759 – Arthur Guinness signs a 9,000-year lease at £45 per annum and starts brewing Guinness.
- 1775 – American Revolutionary War: Battle of Quebec: British forces under General Guy Carleton repulse an attack by Continental Army General Richard Montgomery in a snowstorm.
- 1790 – Efimeris, the oldest Greek newspaper of which issues have survived till today, is published for the first time.
- 1796 – The incorporation of Baltimore as a city.
- 1831 – Gramercy Park is deeded to New York City.
- 1844 – The Philippines skipped this date in order to align the country with the rest of Asia, as the trading interest switched to China, Dutch East Indies and neighboring territories after Mexico gained independence from Spain on 27 September 1821. In the islands, Monday, 30 December 1844 was immediately followed by Wednesday, 1 January 1845.
- 1853 – A dinner party is held inside a life-size model of an iguanodon created by Benjamin Waterhouse Hawkins and Sir Richard Owen in south London, England.
- 1857 – Queen Victoria chooses Ottawa, then a small logging town, as the capital of the Province of Canada.
- 1862 – American Civil War: The three-day Battle of Stones River begins near Murfreesboro, Tennessee between the Confederate Army of Tennessee under General Braxton Bragg and the Union Army of the Cumberland under General William S. Rosecrans.
- 1862 – American Civil War: Abraham Lincoln signs an enabling act that would admit West Virginia to the Union, thus dividing Virginia in two.
- 1878 – Karl Benz, working in Mannheim, Germany, files for a patent on his first reliable two-stroke gas engine. He was granted the patent in 1879.
- 1879 – Thomas Edison demonstrates incandescent lighting to the public for the first time, in Menlo Park, New Jersey.

=== 1901–present ===
- 1906 – Mozaffar ad-Din Shah Qajar signs the Persian Constitution of 1906.
- 1907 – The first ever ball drop in Times Square.
- 1942 – USS Essex, first aircraft carrier of a 24-ship class, is commissioned.
- 1942 – World War II: The Royal Navy defeats the Kriegsmarine at the Battle of the Barents Sea. This leads to the resignation of Grand Admiral Erich Raeder a month later.
- 1944 – World War II: Operation Nordwind, the last major Wehrmacht offensive on the Western Front, begins.
- 1946 – President Harry S. Truman officially proclaims the end of hostilities in World War II.
- 1951 – Cold War: The Marshall Plan expires after distributing more than US$13.3 billion in foreign aid to rebuild Western Europe.
- 1955 – General Motors becomes the first U.S. corporation to make over US$1 billion in a year.
- 1956 – The Romanian Television network begins its first broadcast in Bucharest.
- 1961 – RTÉ, Ireland's state broadcaster, launches its first national television service.
- 1963 – The Central African Federation officially collapses, subsequently becoming Zambia, Malawi and Rhodesia.
- 1965 – Jean-Bédel Bokassa, leader of the Central African Republic army, and his military officers begin a coup d'état against the government of President David Dacko.
- 1968 – The first flight of the Tupolev Tu-144, the first civilian supersonic transport in the world.
- 1968 – MacRobertson Miller Airlines Flight 1750 crashes near Port Hedland, Western Australia, killing all 26 people on board.
- 1981 – A coup d'état in Ghana removes President Hilla Limann's PNP government and replaces it with the Provisional National Defence Council led by Flight lieutenant Jerry Rawlings.
- 1983 – The AT&T Bell System is broken up by the United States Government.
- 1983 – Benjamin Ward is appointed New York City Police Department's first ever African American police commissioner.
- 1983 – In Nigeria, a coup d'état led by Major General Muhammadu Buhari ends the Second Nigerian Republic.
- 1986 – Three disgruntled employees set fire to the Dupont Plaza Hotel in San Juan, Puerto Rico, killing more than 90 people and injuring 140 others, making it the second-deadliest hotel fire in American history.
- 1991 – All official Soviet Union institutions have ceased operations by this date, five days after the Soviet Union is officially dissolved.
- 1992 – Czechoslovakia is peacefully dissolved in what is dubbed by media as the Velvet Divorce, resulting in the creation of the Czech Republic and the Slovak Republic.
- 1994 – This date is skipped altogether in Kiribati as the Phoenix Islands and Line Islands change time zones from UTC−11:00 to UTC+13:00 and UTC−10:00 to UTC+14:00, respectively.
- 1994 – The First Chechen War: The Russian Ground Forces begin a New Year's storming of Grozny.
- 1995 – The final comic of Calvin and Hobbes is published.
- 1998 – The European Exchange Rate Mechanism freezes the values of the legacy currencies in the Eurozone, and establishes the value of the euro currency.
- 1999 – The first President of Russia, Boris Yeltsin, resigns from office, leaving Prime Minister Vladimir Putin as the acting President and successor.
- 1999 – The U.S. government hands control of the Panama Canal (as well all the adjacent land to the canal known as the Panama Canal Zone) to Panama. This act complied with the signing of the 1977 Torrijos–Carter Treaties.
- 1999 – Indian Airlines Flight 814 hijacking ends after seven days with the release of 190 survivors at Kandahar Airport, Afghanistan.
- 2001 – Rwanda adopts a new national flag and anthem.
- 2004 – The official opening of Taipei 101, the tallest skyscraper at that time in the world, standing at a height of 509 metres (1,670 ft).
- 2009 – Both a blue moon and a lunar eclipse occur.
- 2010 – Tornadoes touch down in midwestern and southern United States, including Washington County, Arkansas; Greater St. Louis, Sunset Hills, Missouri, Illinois, and Oklahoma, with a few tornadoes in the early hours. A total of 36 tornadoes touched down, resulting in the deaths of nine people and $113 million in damages.
- 2011 – NASA succeeds in putting the first of two Gravity Recovery and Interior Laboratory satellites in orbit around the Moon.
- 2014 – A New Year's Eve celebration stampede in Shanghai kills at least 36 people and injures 49 others.
- 2015 – A fire breaks out at the Downtown Address Hotel in Downtown Dubai, United Arab Emirates, located near the Burj Khalifa, two hours before the fireworks display is due to commence. Sixteen injuries were reported; one had a heart attack, another suffered a major injury, and fourteen others with minor injuries.
- 2018 – Thirty-nine people are killed after a ten-story building collapses in the industrial city of Magnitogorsk, Russia.
- 2019 – The World Health Organization is informed of cases of pneumonia with an unknown cause, detected in Wuhan. This later turned out to be COVID-19, the cause of the COVID-19 pandemic.
- 2020 – The World Health Organization issues its first emergency use validation for a COVID-19 vaccine.

== Births ==
=== Pre-1600 ===
- 695 – Muhammad ibn al-Qasim, Umayyad general (died 715)
- 1378 – Pope Callixtus III (died 1458)
- 1491 – Jacques Cartier, French navigator and explorer (died 1557)
- 1493 – Eleonora Gonzaga, Duchess of Urbino (died 1570)
- 1504 – Beatrice of Portugal, Duchess of Savoy (died 1538)
- 1514 – Andreas Vesalius, Belgian anatomist, physician, and author (died 1564)
- 1539 – John Radcliffe, English politician (died 1568)
- 1550 – Henry I, Duke of Guise (died 1588)
- 1552 – Simon Forman, English occultist and astrologer (died 1611)
- 1572 – Emperor Go-Yōzei of Japan, (died 1617)
- 1585 – Gonzalo Fernández de Córdoba, Spanish general and politician, 24th Governor of the Duchy of Milan (died 1645)

=== 1601–1900 ===
- 1668 – Herman Boerhaave, Dutch botanist and physician (died 1738)
- 1714 – Arima Yoriyuki, Japanese mathematician and educator (died 1783)
- 1720 – Charles Edward Stuart, Scottish claimant to the throne of England (died 1788)
- 1738 – Charles Cornwallis, 1st Marquess Cornwallis, English general and politician, 3rd Governor-General of India (died 1805)
- 1741 – Gottfried August Bürger, German poet and academic (died 1794)
- 1763 – Pierre-Charles Villeneuve, French admiral (died 1806)
- 1774 – James Bunbury White, American politician (died 1819)
- 1776 – Johann Spurzheim, German-American physician and phrenologist (died 1832)
- 1798 – Friedrich Robert Faehlmann, Estonian physician, philologist, and academic (died 1850)
- 1805 – Marie d'Agoult, German-French historian and author (died 1876)
- 1815 – George Meade, American general and engineer (died 1872)
- 1830 – Isma'il Pasha, Egyptian ruler (died 1895)
- 1830 – Alexander Smith, Scottish poet and critic (died 1867)
- 1833 – Hugh Nelson, Scottish-Australian politician, 11th Premier of Queensland (died 1906)
- 1834 – Queen Kapiolani of Hawaiʻi (died 1899)
- 1838 – Émile Loubet, French lawyer and politician, 7th President of France (died 1929)
- 1842 – Giovanni Boldini, Italian painter (died 1931)
- 1851 – Henry Carter Adams, American economist and academic (died 1921)
- 1855 – Giovanni Pascoli, Italian poet and scholar (died 1912)
- 1857 – King Kelly, American baseball player and manager (died 1894)
- 1860 – Joseph S. Cullinan, American businessman, co-founder of Texaco (died 1937)
- 1864 – Robert Grant Aitken, American astronomer and academic (died 1951)
- 1869 – Henri Matisse, French painter and sculptor (died 1954)
- 1872 – Fred Marriott, American race car driver (died 1956)
- 1873 – Konstantin Konik, Estonian surgeon and politician, 19th Estonian Minister of Education (died 1936)
- 1874 – Julius Meier, American businessman and politician, 20th Governor of Oregon (died 1937)
- 1877 – Lawrence Beesley, English journalist and author (died 1967)
- 1878 – Elizabeth Arden, Canadian businesswoman (died 1966)
- 1878 – Horacio Quiroga, Uruguayan-Argentinian author, poet, and playwright (died 1937)
- 1880 – Fred Beebe, American baseball player and coach (died 1957)
- 1880 – George Marshall, American general and politician, 50th United States Secretary of State (died 1959)
- 1881 – Max Pechstein, German painter and academic (died 1955)
- 1884 – Bobby Byrne, American baseball and soccer player (died 1964)
- 1884 – Mihály Fekete, Hungarian actor, screenwriter, and film director (died 1960)
- 1885 – Princess Victoria Adelaide of Schleswig-Holstein (died 1970)
- 1899 – Silvestre Revueltas, Mexican violinist, composer, and conductor (died 1940)

=== 1901–present ===
- 1901 – Karl-August Fagerholm, Finnish politician, 20th Prime Minister of Finland (died 1984)
- 1901 – Nikos Ploumpidis, Greek educator and politician (died 1954)
- 1902 – Lionel Daunais, Canadian singer-songwriter (died 1982)
- 1902 – Roy Goodall, English footballer (died 1982)
- 1903 – William Heynes, English engineer (died 1989)
- 1905 – Helen Dodson Prince, American astronomer and academic (died 2002)
- 1908 – Simon Wiesenthal, Ukrainian-Austrian Nazi hunter and author (died 2005)
- 1909 – Jonah Jones, American trumpet player and saxophonist (died 2000)
- 1910 – Carl Dudley, American director, producer, and screenwriter (died 1973)
- 1910 – Enrique Maier, Spanish tennis player (died 1981)
- 1911 – Dal Stivens, Australian soldier and author (died 1997)
- 1912 – John Frost, Indian-English general (died 1993)
- 1914 – Mary Logan Reddick, American neuroembryologist (died 1966)
- 1915 – Sam Ragan, American journalist, author, and poet (died 1996)
- 1917 – Evelyn Knight, American singer (died 2007)
- 1917 – Wilfrid Noyce, English mountaineer and author (died 1962)
- 1918 – Ray Graves, American football player and coach (died 2015)
- 1919 – Tommy Byrne, American baseball player, coach, and politician (died 2007)
- 1919 – Carmen Contreras-Bozak, Puerto Rican-American soldier (died 2017)
- 1920 – Rex Allen, American actor and singer-songwriter (died 1999)
- 1922 – Tomás Balduino, Brazilian bishop (died 2014)
- 1922 – Halina Czerny-Stefańska, Polish pianist and educator (died 2001)
- 1922 – Luis Zuloaga, Venezuelan baseball player (died 2013)
- 1923 – Giannis Dalianidis, Greek actor, director, and screenwriter (died 2010)
- 1924 – Taylor Mead, American actor and poet (died 2013)
- 1925 – Irina Korschunow, German author and screenwriter (died 2013)
- 1925 – Sri Lal Sukla, Indian author (died 2011)
- 1925 – Daphne Oram, British composer and electronic musician (died 2003)
- 1926 – Valerie Pearl, English historian and academic (died 2016)
- 1926 – Billy Snedden, Australian lawyer and politician, 17th Attorney-General for Australia (died 1987)
- 1927 – Vishnudevananda Saraswati, Indian yoga guru (died 1993)
- 1928 – Ross Barbour, American pop singer (died 2011)
- 1928 – Hugh McElhenny, American football player (died 2022)
- 1928 – Veijo Meri, Finnish author and translator (died 2015)
- 1928 – Tatyana Shmyga, Russian actress and singer (died 2011)
- 1928 – Siné, French cartoonist (died 2016)
- 1929 – Mies Bouwman, Dutch television host (died 2018)
- 1929 – Peter May, English cricketer (died 1994)
- 1930 – Jaime Escalante, Bolivian-American educator (died 2010)
- 1930 – Odetta, American singer-songwriter, guitarist, and actress (died 2008)
- 1931 – Bob Shaw, Northern Irish journalist and author (died 1996)
- 1932 – Don James, American football player and coach (died 2013)
- 1932 – Felix Rexhausen, German journalist and author (died 1992)
- 1933 – Edward Bunker, American author, screenwriter, and actor (died 2005)
- 1934 – Ameer Muhammad Akram Awan, Indian author, poet, and scholar (died 2017)
- 1934 – Maria Krushelnytska, Ukrainian pianist (died 2025)
- 1937 – Avram Hershko, Hungarian-Israeli biochemist and physician
- 1937 – Barry Hughes, Welsh footballer and manager (died 2019)
- 1937 – Tess Jaray, Austrian-English painter and educator
- 1938 – Rosalind Cash, American actress (died 1995)
- 1938 – Atje Keulen-Deelstra, Dutch speed skater (died 2013)
- 1939 – Willye White, American sprinter and long jumper (died 2007)
- 1940 – Mani Neumeier, German drummer
- 1941 – Sir Alex Ferguson, Scottish footballer and manager
- 1944 – Taylor Hackford, American director, producer, and screenwriter
- 1945 – Connie Willis, American author
- 1946 – Roy Greenslade, English journalist and academic
- 1946 – Bryan Hamilton, Northern Irish footballer and coach
- 1946 – Raphael Kaplinsky, South African international development academic
- 1946 – Pius Ncube, Zimbabwean archbishop
- 1946 – Lyudmila Pakhomova, Russian ice dancer (died 1986)
- 1946 – Cliff Richey, American tennis player
- 1946 – Eric Robson, Scottish journalist and author
- 1946 – Nigel Rudd, English businessman, founder of Williams Holdings
- 1946 – Tim Stevens, English bishop
- 1947 – Rita Lee, Brazilian musician and author (died 2023)
- 1948 – Sandy Jardine, Scottish footballer and manager (died 2014)
- 1948 – René Robert, Canadian ice hockey player (died 2021)
- 1949 – Ellen Datlow, American anthologist and author
- 1949 – Flora Gomes, Bissau-Guinean filmmaker
- 1949 – Susan Shwartz, American author
- 1950 – Bob Gilder, American golfer
- 1950 – Inge Helten, German sprinter
- 1950 – Cheryl Womack, American businesswoman
- 1951 – Kenny Roberts, American motorcycle racer
- 1952 – Vaughan Jones, New Zealand mathematician and academic (died 2020)
- 1952 – Jean-Pierre Rives, French rugby player, painter, and sculptor
- 1953 – Jane Badler, American actress
- 1954 – Alex Salmond, Scottish economist and politician (died 2024)
- 1954 – Hermann Tilke, German racing driver, architect and engineer
- 1955 – Pula Nikolao Pula, 9th governor of American Samoa
- 1956 – Robert Goodwill, English farmer and politician
- 1956 – Helma Knorscheidt, German shot putter
- 1956 – Steve Rude, American author and illustrator
- 1958 – Geoff Marsh, Australian cricketer and coach
- 1959 – Liveris Andritsos, Greek basketball player
- 1959 – Val Kilmer, American actor (died 2025)
- 1959 – Phill Kline, American lawyer and politician
- 1959 – Baron Waqa, Nauruan composer and politician, 14th President of Nauru
- 1959 – Paul Westerberg, American musician, singer, and songwriter
- 1960 – Steve Bruce, English footballer and manager
- 1961 – Rick Aguilera, American baseball player and coach
- 1961 – Jeremy Heywood, English economist and civil servant (died 2018)
- 1961 – Nina Li Chi, Hong Kong actress
- 1961 – Fabian Nicieza, Argentine-American comic book writer and editor
- 1962 – Tyrone Corbin, American basketball player and coach
- 1962 – Chris Hallam, English-Welsh swimmer and wheelchair racer (died 2013)
- 1962 – Jennifer Higdon, American composer
- 1964 – Winston Benjamin, Antiguan cricketer
- 1964 – Michael McDonald, American comedian, actor, and director
- 1965 – Tony Dorigo, Australian-English footballer and sportscaster
- 1965 – Julie Doucet, Canadian cartoonist and author
- 1965 – Laxman Sivaramakrishnan, Indian cricketer
- 1967 – Paul McGregor, Australian rugby league player and coach
- 1968 – Gerry Dee, Canadian comedian, actor, and screenwriter
- 1968 – Junot Diaz, Dominican-born American novelist, short story writer, and essayist
- 1970 – Jorjão, Brazilian footballer
- 1970 – Danny McNamara, English singer-songwriter
- 1970 – Carlos Morales Quintana, Spanish-Danish architect and sailor
- 1970 – Bryon Russell, American basketball player
- 1971 – Brent Barry, American basketball player and sportscaster
- 1971 – Esteban Loaiza, Mexican baseball player
- 1971 – Heath Shuler, American football player and politician
- 1972 – Grégory Coupet, French footballer
- 1972 – Scott Manley, Scottish YouTube personality
- 1973 – Shandon Anderson, American basketball player
- 1973 – Malcolm Middleton, Scottish singer-songwriter and guitarist
- 1973 – Curtis Myden, Canadian swimmer
- 1974 – Mario Aerts, Belgian cyclist
- 1974 – Tony Kanaan, Brazilian race car driver
- 1974 – Ryan Sakoda, Japanese-American wrestler and trainer
- 1975 – Rami Alanko, Finnish ice hockey player
- 1975 – Toni Kuivasto, Finnish footballer and coach
- 1975 – Rob Penders, Dutch footballer
- 1975 – Sander Schutgens, Dutch runner
- 1976 – Luís Carreira, Portuguese motorcycle racer (died 2012)
- 1976 – Matthew Hoggard, English cricketer
- 1977 – Wardy Alfaro, Costa Rican footballer and coach
- 1979 – Paul O'Neill, English racing driver
- 1979 – Jeff Waldstreicher, American lawyer and politician
- 1979 – Ricky Whittle, British actor
- 1980 – Jesse Carlson, American baseball player
- 1980 – Matt Cross, American wrestler
- 1980 – Richie McCaw, New Zealand rugby player
- 1980 – Carsten Schlangen, German runner
- 1981 – Jason Campbell, American football player
- 1981 – Francisco García, Dominican basketball player
- 1981 – Matthew Pavlich, Australian footballer
- 1981 – Margaret Simpson, Ghanaian heptathlete
- 1982 – Julio DePaula, Dominican baseball player
- 1982 – Craig Gordon, Scottish footballer
- 1982 – Luke Schenscher, Australian basketball player
- 1982 – The Rocket Summer, American singer-songwriter, guitarist, and producer
- 1983 – Jana Veselá, Czech basketball player
- 1984 – Corey Crawford, Canadian ice hockey player
- 1984 – Ben Hannant, Australian rugby league player
- 1984 – Édgar Lugo, Mexican footballer
- 1984 – Calvin Zola, Congolese footballer
- 1985 – Jonathan Horton, American gymnast
- 1985 – Jan Smit, Dutch singer and television host
- 1986 – Nate Freiman, American baseball player
- 1986 – Kade Snowden, Australian rugby league player
- 1987 – Javaris Crittenton, American basketball player
- 1987 – Seydou Doumbia, Ivorian footballer
- 1987 – Danny Holla, Dutch footballer
- 1987 – Nemanja Nikolić, Hungarian footballer
- 1988 – Michal Řepík, Czech ice hockey player
- 1989 – Ryo Aitaka, Japanese kickboxer and professional wrestler
- 1989 – Kelvin Herrera, Dominican baseball player
- 1991 – Dennis Everberg, Swedish ice hockey player
- 1991 – Djené, Togolese footballer
- 1991 – ND Stevenson, American cartoonist
- 1991 – Brandon Tanev, Canadian ice hockey player
- 1992 – Amy Cure, Australian track cyclist
- 1992 – Karl Kruuda, Estonian racing driver
- 1995 – Gabby Douglas, American gymnast
- 1995 – Edmond Sumner, American basketball player
- 1996 – J. J. Arcega-Whiteside, Spanish-American football player
- 1997 – Ludovic Blas, French footballer
- 1997 – Cameron Carter-Vickers, English-American soccer player
- 1997 – Bright Osayi-Samuel, Nigerian footballer
- 1999 – Calvin Bassey, Italian-Nigerian footballer
- 1999 – Leif Davis, English footballer
- 2000 – Alycia Parks, American tennis player
- 2001 – Katie Volynets, American tennis player
- 2002 – Ryan Flamingo, Dutch footballer
- 2002 – Sophia Laforteza, Filipino-American singer
- 2002 – Joe Scally, American soccer player

== Deaths ==
=== Pre-1600 ===
- 45 BC – Quintus Fabius Maximus, consul suffectus
- 192 – Commodus, Roman emperor (born 161)
- 335 – Pope Sylvester I
- 669 – Li Shiji, Chinese general (born 594)
- 914 – Ibn Hawshab, founder of the Isma'ili community in Yemen
- 1032 – Ahmad Maymandi, Persian statesman, vizier of the Ghaznavid Empire
- 1164 – Ottokar III of Styria (born 1124)
- 1194 – Leopold V, Duke of Austria (born 1157)
- 1298 – Humphrey de Bohun, 3rd Earl of Hereford, English politician, Lord High Constable of England (born 1249)
- 1299 – Margaret, Countess of Anjou (born 1273)
- 1302 – Frederick III, Duke of Lorraine (born 1238)
- 1384 – John Wycliffe, English philosopher, theologian, and translator (born 1331)
- 1386 – Johanna of Bavaria, Queen of Bohemia (born c. 1362)
- 1426 – Thomas Beaufort, Duke of Exeter (born 1377)
- 1439 – Margaret Holland, English noblewoman (born 1385)
- 1460 – Richard Neville, 5th Earl of Salisbury, English politician, Lord Chancellor of the United Kingdom (born 1400)
- 1510 – Bianca Maria Sforza, Holy Roman Empress (born 1472)
- 1535 – William Skeffington, English-Irish politician, Lord Deputy of Ireland (born 1465)
- 1568 – Shimazu Tadayoshi, Japanese daimyō (born 1493)
- 1575 – Pierino Belli, Italian commander and jurist (born 1502)
- 1583 – Thomas Erastus, Swiss physician and theologian (born 1524)

=== 1601–1900 ===
- 1610 – Ludolph van Ceulen, German-Dutch mathematician and academic (born 1540)
- 1637 – Christian, Count of Waldeck-Wildungen, German count (born 1585)
- 1650 – Dorgon, Chinese emperor (born 1612)
- 1655 – Janusz Radziwiłł, Polish–Lithuanian politician (born 1612)
- 1655 – Sir John Wray, 2nd Baronet, English politicians and Roundheads supporter (born 1586)
- 1673 – Oliver St John, English judge and politician, Chief Justice of the Common Pleas (born 1598)
- 1679 – Giovanni Alfonso Borelli, Italian physiologist and physicist (born 1608)
- 1691 – Robert Boyle, Anglo-Irish chemist and physicist (born 1627)
- 1691 – Dudley North, English merchant and economist (born 1641)
- 1705 – Catherine of Braganza, Queen Consort of England, Scotland and Ireland (born 1638)
- 1719 – John Flamsteed, English astronomer and academic (born 1646)
- 1730 – Carlo Gimach, Maltese architect, engineer and poet (born 1651)
- 1742 – Charles III Philip, Elector Palatine (born 1661)
- 1775 – Richard Montgomery, American general (born 1738)
- 1799 – Jean-François Marmontel, French historian and author (born 1723)
- 1818 – Jean-Pierre Duport, French cellist (born 1741)
- 1872 – Aleksis Kivi, Finnish author and playwright (born 1834)
- 1876 – Catherine Labouré, French nun and saint (born 1806)
- 1877 – Gustave Courbet, French-Swiss painter and sculptor (born 1819)
- 1888 – Samson Raphael Hirsch, German rabbi and scholar (born 1808)
- 1889 – Ion Creangă, Romanian author and educator (born 1837)
- 1889 – George Kerferd, English-Australian politician, 10th Premier of Victoria (born 1831)
- 1890 – Pancha Carrasco, Costa Rican soldier (born 1826)
- 1891 – Samuel Ajayi Crowther, Nigerian bishop and linguist (born 1809)
- 1894 – Thomas Joannes Stieltjes, Dutch mathematician and academic (born 1856)

=== 1901–present ===
- 1909 – Spencer Trask, American financier and philanthropist (born 1844)
- 1910 – Archibald Hoxsey, American pilot (born 1884)
- 1910 – John Moisant, American pilot and engineer (born 1868)
- 1921 – Boies Penrose, American lawyer and politician (born 1860)
- 1934 – Cornelia Clapp, American marine biologist (born 1849)
- 1936 – Miguel de Unamuno, Spanish philosopher, author, and poet (born 1864)
- 1948 – Malcolm Campbell, English racing driver and journalist (born 1885)
- 1949 – Rıza Tevfik Bölükbaşı, Turkish philosopher, poet, and politician (born 1869)
- 1949 – Raimond Valgre, Estonian pianist and composer (born 1913)
- 1950 – Charles Koechlin, French composer and educator (born 1867)
- 1951 – Murtaza Hasan Chandpuri, Indian Muslim scholar (born 1868)
- 1953 – Albert Plesman, Dutch businessman, founded KLM (born 1889)
- 1964 – Bobby Byrne, American baseball and soccer player (born 1884)
- 1964 – Ólafur Thors, Icelandic lawyer and politician, 8th Prime Minister of Iceland (born 1892)
- 1964 – Henry Maitland Wilson, English field marshal (born 1881)
- 1968 – George Lewis, American clarinet player and composer (born 1900)
- 1970 – Cyril Scott, English composer, writer, and poet (born 1879)
- 1972 – Roberto Clemente, Puerto Rican-American baseball player and Marine (born 1934)
- 1972 – Henry Gerber, German-American activist, founded the Society for Human Rights (born 1892)
- 1978 – Basil Wolverton, American illustrator (born 1909)
- 1980 – Marshall McLuhan, Canadian philosopher and theorist (born 1911)
- 1980 – Raoul Walsh, American actor, director, producer, and screenwriter (born 1887)
- 1983 – Sevim Burak, Turkish author and playwright (born 1931)
- 1985 – Ricky Nelson, American singer-songwriter, guitarist, and actor (born 1940)
- 1987 – Jerry Turner, American journalist (born 1929)
- 1988 – Nicolas Calas, Greek-American poet and critic (born 1907)
- 1990 – George Allen, American football player and coach (born 1918)
- 1990 – Vasily Lazarev, Russian physician, colonel, and astronaut (born 1928)
- 1990 – Giovanni Michelucci, Italian architect and urban planner, designed the Firenze Santa Maria Novella railway station (born 1891)
- 1993 – Zviad Gamsakhurdia, Georgian anthropologist and politician, 1st President of Georgia (born 1939)
- 1993 – Brandon Teena, American murder victim (born 1972)
- 1993 – Big Bertha, Irish cattle and twice Guinness World Record holder (oldest cow, cow with most offspring) (born 1945)
- 1994 – Woody Strode, American football player, wrestler, and actor (born 1914)
- 1996 – Wesley Addy, American actor (born 1913)
- 1997 – Floyd Cramer, American singer-songwriter and pianist (born 1933)
- 1997 – Billie Dove, American actress (born 1903)
- 1998 – Ted Glossop, Australian rugby league player and coach (born 1934)
- 1999 – Elliot Richardson, American lawyer and politician, 69th United States Attorney General (born 1920)
- 1999 – Abul Hasan Ali Nadwi, Indian Muslim scholar and author (born 1914)
- 2000 – Alan Cranston, American journalist and politician (born 1914)
- 2000 – José Greco, Italian-American dancer and choreographer (born 1918)
- 2000 – Binyamin Ze'ev Kahane, American-Israeli rabbi and scholar (born 1966)
- 2001 – Eileen Heckart, American actress (born 1919)
- 2002 – Kevin MacMichael, Canadian guitarist, songwriter, and producer (born 1951)
- 2003 – Arthur R. von Hippel German-American physicist and author (born 1898)
- 2004 – Gérard Debreu, French economist and mathematician, Nobel Prize laureate (born 1921)
- 2005 – Enrico Di Giuseppe, American tenor and educator (born 1932)
- 2005 – Phillip Whitehead, English screenwriter, producer, and politician (born 1937)
- 2006 – Ya'akov Hodorov, Israeli footballer (born 1927)
- 2006 – Seymour Martin Lipset, American sociologist, author, and academic (born 1922)
- 2006 – George Sisler, Jr., American businessman (born 1917)
- 2007 – Roy Amara, American scientific researcher (born 1925)
- 2007 – Michael Goldberg, American painter and educator (born 1924)
- 2007 – Bill Idelson, American actor, producer, and screenwriter (born 1919)
- 2007 – Milton L. Klein, Canadian lawyer and politician (born 1910)
- 2007 – Ettore Sottsass, Austrian-Italian architect and designer (born 1917)
- 2008 – Donald E. Westlake, American author and screenwriter (born 1933)
- 2009 – Cahal Daly, Irish cardinal and philosopher, Archbishop of Armagh (born 1917)
- 2009 – Justin Keating, Irish surgeon, journalist, and politician, Minister for Industry and Commerce (born 1930)
- 2010 – Raymond Impanis, Belgian cyclist (born 1925)
- 2010 – Per Oscarsson, Swedish actor, director, producer, and screenwriter (born 1927)
- 2012 – Tarak Mekki, Tunisian businessman and politician (born 1958)
- 2012 – Jovette Marchessault, Canadian author and playwright (born 1938)
- 2012 – Günter Rössler, German photographer and journalist (born 1926)
- 2013 – James Avery, American actor (born 1945)
- 2013 – Roberto Ciotti, Italian guitarist and composer (born 1953)
- 2013 – Bob Grant, American radio host (born 1929)
- 2013 – Irina Korschunow, German author and screenwriter (born 1925)
- 2014 – Edward Herrmann, American actor (born 1943)
- 2014 – Abdullah Hussain, Malaysian author (born 1920)
- 2014 – Norm Phelps, American author and activist (born 1939)
- 2014 – S. Arthur Spiegel, American captain, lawyer, and judge (born 1920)
- 2014 – Valerian Wellesley, 8th Duke of Wellington, British soldier and politician (born 1915)
- 2015 – Natalie Cole, American singer-songwriter and actress (born 1950)
- 2015 – Wayne Rogers, American actor and investor (born 1933)
- 2016 – William Christopher, American actor (born 1932)
- 2018 – Kader Khan, Indian actor (born 1937)
- 2021 – Betty White, American actress, comedian and producer (born 1922)
- 2022 – Pope Benedict XVI, German Roman Catholic cardinal and theologian, pope (2005–2013) and archbishop of Munich and Freising (1977–1982) (born 1927)
- 2022 – Barry Lane, English golfer (born 1960)
- 2023 – Cale Yarborough, American Hall of Fame racing driver and founder of Cale Yarborough Motorsports, NASCAR Cup Series champion (1976, 1977, 1978) (born 1939)
- 2024 – Arnold Rüütel, Estonian politician, 3rd President of Estonia (born 1928)
- 2024 – Johnnie Walker, British radio DJ (born 1945)

== Holidays and observances ==
- Christian feast day:
  - Pope Sylvester I (Catholic Church)
  - December 31 (Eastern Orthodox liturgics)
- International Solidarity Day of Azerbaijanis (Azerbaijan)
- New Year's Eve (International observance), and its related observances:
  - First Night (United States)
  - Last Day of the Year or Bisperás ng Bagong Taón, special holiday between Rizal Day and New Year's Day (Philippines)
  - Novy God Eve (Russia)
  - Ōmisoka (Japan)
  - The first day of Hogmanay or "Auld Year's Night" (Scotland)
- The seventh of the Twelve Days of Christmas (Western Christianity)
- The sixth and penultimate day of Kwanzaa (United States)

== See also ==
- January 0
