= Aussiedler and Spätaussiedler =

German immigrants

Aussiedler und Spätaussiedler (English: settlers and resettlers) refers to immigrants of German descent who returned to the Federal Republic of Germany from a state of the former Eastern Bloc to settle there. Until the end of the 1980s, most came from Poland and Romania; since 1990, mostly from the successor states of the Soviet Union.

Until 31 December 1992, such people were officially called resettlers.

- Who were born as German nationals in the formerly German territories east of the Oder-Neisse line and initially remained there after 1945, as well as their descendants and spouses of other ethnic origins and national identity (according to § 4 para. 3 sentence 2 BVFG) who have resettled in Germany, Abs. 3 Satz 2 BVFG), or
- Those who, as ethnic Germans from a socialist-governed country, have resettled in the territory of the Federal Republic of Germany or the German Democratic Republic as part of an admission procedure, as well as the relatives who accompanied them during their resettlement.

The term "late repatriate" is only used for people who immigrated to Germany on or after 1 January 1993. Those who entered Germany before 1 January 1993, and were recognized as repatriates retain their repatriate status (regardless of everyday usage). For individuals who entered Germany on or after 1 January 2005, the Federal Office of Administration, not the state authorities, issues the late repatriate certificate. Recognition as a repatriate or late repatriate is governed by the Federal Expellee Law. The terms "repatriate" and "late repatriate" are primarily intended to encompass members of German minorities whose families have lived for generations in East-Central, Eastern, and Southeastern Europe, as well as in Central Asia, and who have emigrated to Germany.

== Legal status and recognition procedure ==
The relevant law for examining the requirements for recognition as a late repatriate is the Federal Expellee Law (BVFG), which entered into force on 19 May 1953 and is now applied in a highly modified form following numerous reforms. The BVFG remains explicitly "not an instrument for controlling immigration […], but rather an instrument for dealing with the consequences of the war".

Persons who enter the Federal Republic of Germany as ethnic Germans through the admission procedure initially acquire the status of a German citizen under Article 116 Paragraph 1 of the Basic Law and, after issuance of the certificate pursuant to Section 15 Paragraph 1 of the Federal Expellees Act (BVFG), then German citizenship by operation of law within the meaning of Article 116 of the Basic Law. At the same time, they also acquire the status of a late repatriate. In addition to the late repatriate, family members of the late repatriate can also be included in their admission notice (since 14 September 2013) (Section 7 Paragraph 2 BVFG); these include:

- the spouse of the late repatriate,
- Descendants of the late repatriate (children, grandchildren, great-grandchildren, etc.).

These persons are issued a so-called inclusion notice pursuant to Section 27 Paragraph 2 of the Federal Expellees Act (BVFG). The Federal Expellees Act also allows other family members of the late repatriate, who do not belong to the aforementioned group of persons, to leave the country at the same time as a person who holds a receipt or inclusion notice ( Section 8 Paragraph 2 BVFG). Legally, this is made possible by a national visa valid for 90 days without the consent of the immigration authorities, which, after admission to the federal territory, is converted into a residence permit for family reunification pursuant to Section 39 No. 1 of the Residence Ordinance (AufenthV) (Resolution of the Standing Conference of Interior Ministers and Senators of the Länder of 6/7 December 2007). These other family members include, among others:

- the spouse of a descendant of the late repatriate (son-in-law/daughter-in-law or grandson-in-law/granddaughter-in-law etc.)
- the minor and unmarried descendant of a spouse of the late repatriate (stepson/stepdaughter or step-grandson/step-granddaughter)
- the spouse or minor and unmarried descendant of the late repatriate who cannot be included in the late repatriate's acceptance notice for legal reasons

However, these individuals do not acquire German citizenship, but rather reside in the Federal Republic of Germany under immigration law.

Anyone wishing to be recognized in Germany as a late repatriate, spouse of a late repatriate, or descendant of a late repatriate must enter the country with a certificate of admission or inclusion. This certificate is issued upon proof of German ethnicity/National identity through a formal written application process.

A late repatriate is generally a person of German ethnicity who left the Republics of the former Soviet Union after 31 December 1992, through the admission procedure and took up permanent residence within six months in the area of application of the law […].

The following requirements can be identified from the legal definition:

=== German ethnicity ===
The definition of German ethnicity can be found in §6 BVFG. It is divided into paragraph 1 (persons born before 31 December 1923) and paragraph 2 (persons born on or after 1 January 1924).

Paragraph 1 is based in its basic outline on a circular issued by the Reich Ministry of the Interior on 29 March 1939 (RMBliV, p. 783) and was only shortened by the introduction of the Federal Expellees Act (BVFG) by the passage "Persons of foreign blood, especially Jews, are never considered to be of German ethnicity, even if they have previously described themselves as such." The fact that part of this definition was adopted from the wording of the National Socialist regulation of 1939, has repeatedly given rise to criticism and tensions in connection with the discussion about "Germanness", for which this legal definition is often used. Nevertheless, a sharp distinction can be drawn between this and the West German concept of ancestry (Abstammung), because today adopted children are treated equally to biological children.

Paragraph 2, which today applies to the far greater number of people (>99%) is split into three sections:

==== Descent from a person of German ethnicity ====
This refers to purely biological descent. This means that adopted children or persons who cannot prove their ancestry due to missing documents generally lack descent from a person of German ethnicity (No. 2.1 BVFG-VwV to § 6).

The person to whom one refers regarding ancestry must be of German ethnicity within the meaning of paragraph 1; according to prevailing opinion, this is certainly assumed in the case of persons who:

- who were demonstrably subjected to expulsion measures against the German minority due to their German ethnicity in the period 1941–1956 (e.g. expulsion or members of a labor army),
- who were at least 18 years old in June 1941 and had registered themselves as having German nationality in a civil status document (e.g., in a child's birth certificate),
- which, based on an overall assessment, can only be attributed to German ethnicity and no other.

==== A commitment to German national identity ====
According to the legal text, the "declaration of allegiance to the German people" can:

- through an explicit declaration of nationality or
- family-based teaching of the German language or
- This can be demonstrated by proving particularly good command of the German language (usually language skills at level B1 of the Common European Framework of Reference for Languages).

Whether the aforementioned options for declaring one's faith constitute a hierarchy or are to be considered equivalent is not entirely clear and is therefore the basis of intense debate between legal scholars and public administration. A clarifying ruling from the Federal Administrative Court is still pending.

==== Language skills ====
Proficiency in the German language is a part of the requirements. The applicant for resettlement as a late repatriate is invited by the responsible administrative authority to the German diplomatic mission abroad and tested there. The extent to which language tests from other organizations are also sufficient to demonstrate language proficiency is not clearly regulated. However, various language tests corresponding to level B1 of the Common European Framework of Reference for Languages are recognized, as the legislator has explicitly mentioned this language level in Section 6 Paragraph 2 of the Federal Expellees Act (BVFG).

Spouses and adult descendants of the ethnic German resettler who are to be included in their acceptance notice must also demonstrate basic knowledge of the German language. According to the administrative regulation, this corresponds to level A1 of the Common European Framework of Reference for Languages.

=== Cut-off date rule, residence criterion and entry via the admission procedure ===
A late repatriate is someone who […]

- since 8 May 1945 or
- following his expulsion or the expulsion of a parent since 31 March 1952 or
- since his birth, if he was born before 1 January 1993 and is descended from a person who meets the cut-off date requirement of 8 May 1945 according to number 1 or of 31 March 1952 according to number 2, unless that parents or ancestors only moved their residence to the resettlement areas after 31 March 1952, had his residence in the resettlement areas.

Only those born before 1 January 1993, can become ethnic German resettlers. According to the Cologne Administrative Court, this seemingly arbitrary cut-off date does not constitute unconstitutional unequal treatment compared to those born from 1993 onwards. Article 3, paragraph 1 of the Basic Law does not prohibit the legislature from drawing this line.

For persons who already have their main residence in the federal territory, admission is only possible on a hardship basis for a foreseeable period (3–12 months) after entry (special conditions must be asserted, e.g. refugee of the war in Ukraine, which explain why waiting for the procedure in the country of origin was impossible for the applicant).

After this period, recognition as a late repatriate is no longer possible, as the criterion of § 4 BVFG is lacking (no entry within the framework of the admission procedure with admission or inclusion notice).

Persons who have taken up their main residence in a country that is not listed in § 4 BVFG may also lack the above-mentioned criterion.

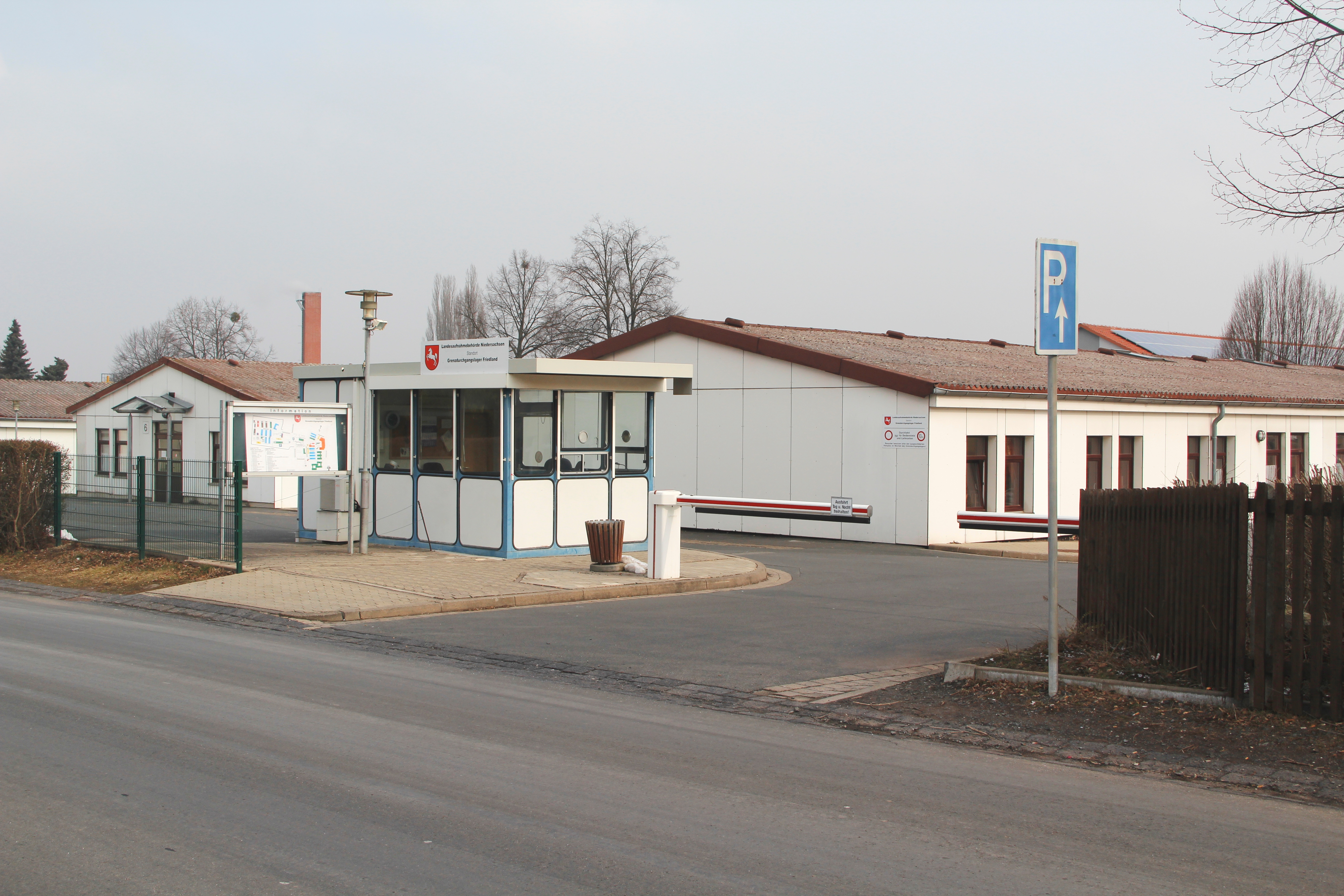
Friedland Camp

Today, all ethnic German repatriates entering the Federal Republic of Germany are initially received at the Friedland border transit camp. They are registered there and distributed among the individual federal states according to the Königsteiner Schlüssel.

=== Exclusion criteria according to § 5 BVFG ===
According to § 5 BVFG, the legal status of a late repatriate is not acquired by anyone who:

- in the resettlement areas of the National Socialist or other tyrannical regimes,
- in the resettlement areas, his behaviour violated the principles of humanity or the rule of law,
- in the resettlement areas, he has seriously abused his position for his own benefit or to the detriment of others,
- has committed an unlawful act which would be considered a crime within the meaning of Section 12 Paragraph 1 of the Criminal Code in Germany, unless the act is time-barred under German law or a conviction for it is to be expunged under the Federal Central Register Act, or
- based on a conclusion justified by factual evidence – unless he credibly demonstrates that he has renounced his previous actions
  - belongs or has belonged to an association that supports terrorism, or supports or has supported such an association,
  - has participated in acts of violence in pursuit of political goals, or has publicly called for or threatened the use of violence, or
  - pursued or supported, or has pursued or supported, endeavours that are directed against the free democratic basic order, the existence or security of the Federation or a state, or the idea of international understanding,
- leave the resettlement areas due to the threat of criminal prosecution for a criminal offense or
- in the resettlement areas, he performed a function that was usually considered important for maintaining the communist system of rule, or was important due to the circumstances of the individual case, or
- who has lived in the same household as the holder of such a position for at least three years.

=== Reopening of proceedings that have been definitively concluded ===
The current legal situation also allows for the possibility of reopening legally concluded (and unappealable) proceedings without a time limit. This is made possible by an amendment to Section 27 Paragraph 3 of the Federal Constitutional Court Act (BVG), which overrides the normally applicable three-month period stipulated in Section 51 Paragraph 3 of the Administrative Procedure Act.

=== Subsequent inclusion ===
It is becoming increasingly common for descendants born after the departure of a late repatriate living in Germany to be considered no longer residing in their country of origin. Consequently, they can only be granted asylum in Germany under immigration law. This wording of the law often leads to inconsistencies in practice. For example, a late repatriate who entered Germany in 2004 and now wishes to retroactively include two grandchildren born in 2003 and 2005 in their asylum application. The grandchild born in 2003 receives the privileged status under Section 7 Paragraph 2 of the Federal Expellees Act (BVFG) as well as German citizenship. The child born in 2005 does not, as it is not considered to have remained in its country of origin and is therefore considered to be residing in Germany under immigration law.

=== Rights and obligations of ethnic German repatriates ===
In principle, all civil rights apply to ethnic German resettlers and late repatriates. Due to the Residence Allocation Act late repatriates were previously restricted in their freedom of movement after entering Germany if they could not support themselves through their own employment. The background to this measure was the fact that many late repatriates settled where family members already lived, which led to high proportions of resettlers in the municipalities concerned and threatened to overwhelm the capacity of these municipalities. Due to the steadily declining immigration of ethnic German resettlers over many years, the law became largely obsolete and was therefore repealed on 31 December 2009.

Some municipalities view "resettler" or "late repatriate" quotas in the allocation of building plots as a tool to limit the proportion of resettlers and late repatriates among the inhabitants of the municipality in question (for example, the municipality of Holdorf). However, such regulations can be overturned by the local government supervisory authority for violating Article 3, Paragraph 3 of the Basic Law, since unequal treatment of people born in the "wrong place" constitutes prohibited discrimination based on national origin and is unconstitutional.

With regard to the Foreign Pensions Act, it is of central importance whether someone entered Germany as a resettler or late resettler, or as a relative of a resettler or late resettler: Only persons who themselves had resettler or late resettler status upon entry have thereby acquired entitlements under the Foreign Pensions Act, i.e., a higher old-age pension (Altersrente) than mere relatives.

Young men with resettler or late resettler status were also subject to conscription and military service according to Article 12a of the Basic Law until this was suspended as part of a Bundeswehr reform on 1 July 2011.

== Background ==
=== Immigration and recognition ===
German citizens who remained in the former German territories east of the Oder and Neisse rivers after 1945, and their descendants, initially formed the largest group among the resettlers. Due to their mostly continued German citizenship, this group possessed the right to freedom of movement in the Federal Republic of Germany under Article 11 of the Basic Law, meaning they did not require an entry permit.

From 1950 to 2005, the following people came to the Federal Republic of Germany as ethnic German repatriates or late repatriates:

- from the Soviet Union and successor states: 2,334,334
- From Poland: 1,444,847 (the Polish diaspora in Germany has a total of 2.5 million members)
- from Romania: 430,101
- from Czechoslovakia and successor states: 105,095
- from Yugoslavia and successor states: 90,378
- from other areas: 55,716
- from Hungary: 21,411

In 1990, a formal admission procedure was introduced, in which applicants must demonstrate in their country of origin that they meet the admission criteria. Since 1997, a language test, known as Sprachtest, has been required, and since 2005, this has also been required for spouses and children.

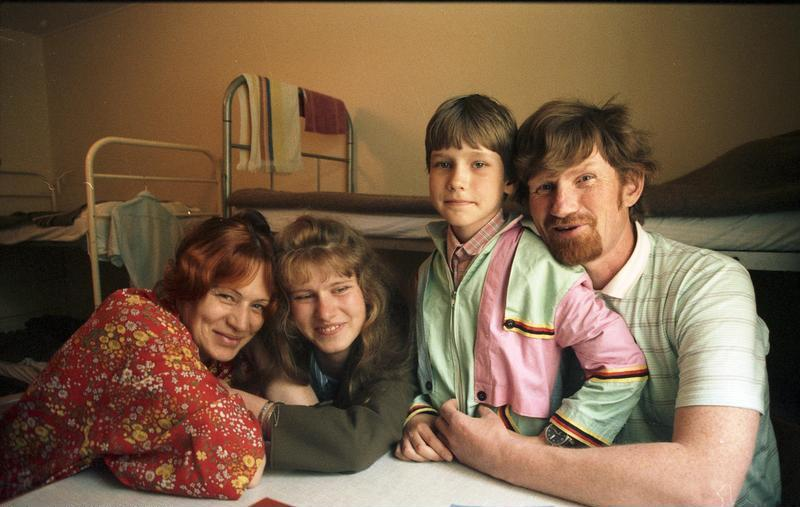
Family from Siberia, June 1988 at Friedland Camp

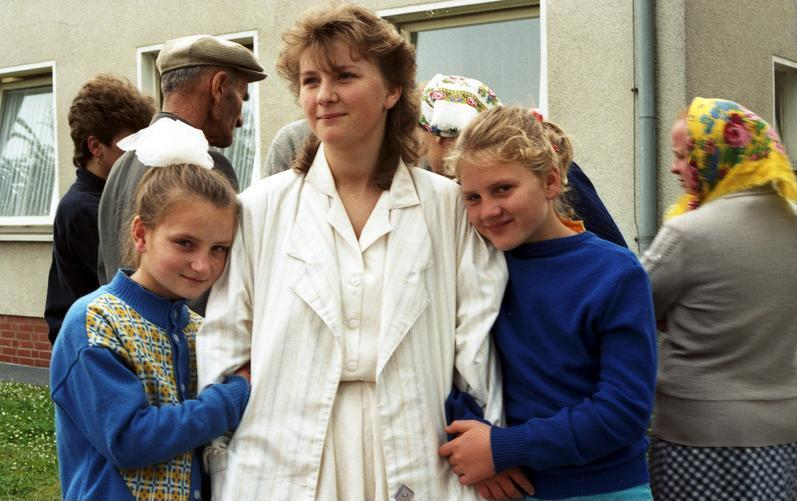
German repatriates from Kazakhstan arriving in Friedland Camp in 1988

The descendants of German emigrants who settled in Eastern Europe (Romania, Hungary, Ukraine, and especially Russia) before the 20th century were able to immigrate to the Federal Republic of Germany from the 1960s onwards, upon application (and by citing their German ethnicity and/or family reunification) , provided they were granted permission to leave their respective countries. Before the fall of the Berlin Wall in 1989, obtaining an exit permit from a socialist country of the Soviet Union was fraught with great difficulty, decades of waiting, and reprisals, even if German authorities signalled their willingness to accept them.

Many ethnic Germans had come to Germany during the Second World War or had served for Germany abroad. They were often defamed as "poached Germans" by "Reich Germans", primarily because their supposedly "strange", "foreign" language was deemed unnatural, preventing them from being considered "real Germans." Other ethnic Germans were deported to the Siberian or Asian territories of the Soviet Union immediately after the war—as reparations to compensate for the costs incurred by the USSR in fighting Germany—and forced to work in factories or mines. Even these ethnic Germans, as resettlers or late repatriates, were later insulted as "poached Germans" by some long-established residents of the Federal Republic of Germany after their resettlement.

The term Spätaussiedler (late repatriate) was originally an unofficial designation for repatriates who, from the end of the 1970s until 31 December 1992, had succeeded in leaving for the Federal Republic of Germany or had often been permitted to do so in exchange for German "compensation payments" to the countries of origin.

Population

Years	(Late) resettlers and their family members
1950–1959	438,225
1960–1969	221,516
1970–1979	355,381
1980–1989	984,087
1990*	397,073
1991	221,995
1992	230,565
1993	218,888
1994	222,591
1995	217,898
1996	177,751
1997	134,419
1998	103,080
1999	104,916
2000	95,615
2001	98.484
2002	91.418
2003	72,885
2004	59,093
2005	35,522
2006	7,747
2007	5,792
2008	4,362
2009	3,360
2010	2,350
2011	2,148
2012	1,817
2013	2,427
2014	5,649
2015	6,118
2016	6,588
2017	7,059
2018	7,126
2019	7,155
2020	4,309
2021	7,052
2022	7,010

*) 1990: West Germany.

Source for 1950–1989: bpb;

Source for 1990–2011: bpb;

Source for 1950–2022: BVA.

Between 1951 and 1987, approximately 1.4 million ethnic German repatriates immigrated to West Germany, predominantly from Poland and Romania. Their integration proceeded largely without problems. With the opening of the Eastern Bloc following Mikhail Gorbachev's rise, the situation changed drastically: from 1988 onward, the number of repatriates increased dramatically, reaching a peak of almost 400,000 in 1990. Since then, the influx of repatriates has steadily declined. While the proportion of people from Poland and Romania decreased rapidly due to democratization processes and the improvement in the minority situation, the proportion of ethnic Germans from Russia and Kazakhstan has risen sharply since the end of the Soviet Union in 1991 and the ease of emigration.

The emigration requests of Germans and ethnic Germans in Central, Eastern and Southeastern Europe were supported bilaterally, and from 1986 also within the framework of the Helsinki Accords by the Working Group on Resettlement in the Legal Department of the Federal Foreign Office in Bonn.

As part of family reunification, some Germans from the aforementioned countries also came to East Germany. However, their numbers were not officially recorded by the local authorities, as they were classified not as Germans, but as citizens of their country of origin, and thus as foreign immigrants or "aliens".

When classifying people as ethnic German resettlers, it was automatically assumed, for the sake of simplicity, that anyone who came to Germany as a German from a (formerly) communist country had been "expelled" from their homeland as an "ethnically persecuted person" (even if they wanted to leave the country themselves without pressure from the authorities or the majority of the population, or if entirely different factors than discrimination as a German were at play). However, during the deliberations on the War Consequences Settlement Act, which came into force on 1 January 1993, the majority in the Bundestag came to the conclusion that the political situation in Romania and Poland had normalized to such an extent that the German minorities there were no longer persecuted. Thus, only those members of the German minority who could individually prove that they had been persecuted and discriminated against because of their nationality would be entitled to recognition as expellees. With regard to ethnic Germans from the successor states of the Soviet Union, however, it was maintained even after 1992 that every ethnic German had been subjected to ethnic persecution in their region of origin and had been expelled from there.

After 1990, Germany experienced an increased influx of ethnic German repatriates from Eastern Europe. In recent years, this influx has slowed. Until 1995, more than 200,000 ethnic German repatriates still came to Germany annually, in accordance with a legally defined annual quota; the language tests introduced in 1996 limited this influx, so that the numbers fell below 100,000 annually until the new millennium. While more than 1.6 million people migrated to Germany again until 2012, since 2006 the number has been only a few thousand per year. According to the Federal Office for Migration and Refugees (BAMF), 7,500 ethnic German repatriates came to Germany in 2005, but only 1,817 in 2012.

The Federal Statistical Office determined, based on the Mikrozensus, that in 2011 approximately 3.2 million ethnic German resettlers and accompanying family members were living in Germany, meaning that 71% of the approximately 4.5 million ethnic German resettlers and ethnic German resettlers who immigrated between 1950 and 2011 were still living in German. The difference is mainly attributed to deaths and only to a small extent to emigration from Germany.

It was only in 2014 that the number rose noticeably again to 5,649 due to a change in the law. Also in 2014, 30,009 applications were received by the Federal Office of Administration (BVA), more than in the three previous years combined. According to historian Alfred Eisfeld, the reasons for this renewed increase included the removal of the ban on family reunification and the fact that many Germans living in Kazakhstan no longer saw a future for themselves there.

People who wish to resettle in Germany as late repatriates today and in the future must prove their claim to be of German ethnicity by demonstrating sufficient command of the German language.

The focus on the German language skills of those wishing to emigrate was justified in 2001 during the deliberations on the revision of Section 6 of the Federal Expellees Act (BVFG) in the German Bundestag as follows: "Late repatriates would hardly be perceived as (former) ethnic Germans if they could be recognized as such without German language skills; moreover, their integration would be further hampered. In particular, a lack of German language skills is increasingly proving to be a significant obstacle to the integration of ethnic German late repatriate families from Russia into Germany. This creates burdens on social welfare budgets (Sozialhaushalte), which will be particularly difficult to justify if recognition as late repatriates is to be possible despite a lack of German language skills".

According to censuses in the Soviet Union, the proportion of those who stated German as their mother tongue among those registered as "Germans" fell from 66.8 percent in 1970 to 48.7 percent in 1989. In a study by the Friedrich Ebert Foundation in 2003, 64 percent of ethnic German resettlers admitted to Germany stated that they had not spoken German at home in their country of origin.

Recent studies of sociolinguistics suggest that someone "who does not have native-level fluency in German […] will find it difficult to maintain their claimed German identity without question". However, there is also opposition to the idea that only those who have been taught German by their parents are ethnically German.

To encourage ethnic Germans, especially those living in Poland and Russia, to remain in their current areas of residence, the Federal Government of Germany has developed a system of assistance (Bleibehilfen) for remaining in the country, based on Section 96 of the Federal Expellees Act (BVFG).

=== Integration into society ===
Regarding the integration of ethnic German resettlers, the Schader Foundation states in a study published in 2007:

- The vast majority of ethnic Germans from the Russian Soviet Federative Socialist Republic who emigrated to Germany were socialized in a Soviet environment. Only the oldest generation still remembers the purely German marriages and neighbourhoods that were common before World War II, after which they were destroyed. Their culture and way of life were no longer even based on an outdated and stagnant image of Germany, but rather on contemporary cultural and consumer patterns of Soviet societies.
- The main reason for relocating to Germany after the collapse of the Soviet Union was the chance to secure a better future for themselves and their children in a wealthy country.
- Emigration to Germany was often achieved against the resistance of family members. Older children and teenagers, in particular, were unwilling to give up their old way of life and the peer groups within which they moved.
- The stigmatization of people of German descent as 'Germans' or even pejoratively as 'Nazis' in the Soviet Union transformed, after resettlement in West Germany, into stigmatization as 'Russians'. This verbal expression of exclusion was adopted, particularly by the younger generation, as a marker of their own identity formation and self-differentiation, and still causes considerable integration problems.
- The exclusion experienced in the host country, both externally imposed and self-imposed, which particularly affects many young male immigrants, is closely linked to the timing of their resettlement to Germany, before or after the mid-1990s. The early groups of immigrants still possessed knowledge of the German language and culture and encountered favourable labour market conditions in Germany; their structural integration was swift and successful. Among the later groups of immigrants, only a few individuals still had German language skills, and their cultural socialization was entirely Russian or Soviet. The deteriorating labour market situation in Germany and reduced funding, for example for language courses, significantly hampered their integration into the host country. For these individuals, the history of migration is therefore, in many cases, a history of social decline.

A major reason for this stigmatization is the belief held by many long-established Germans that one is only "German" if one has a sufficiently good command of the German language. According to a study presented at the 47th Congress of the German Society for Psychology in Bremen in 2010, 96.6 percent of all native Germans hold this view.

At a conference on "Migration and Integration" held by the Friedrich Ebert Foundation in March 2003, it was noted that ethnic German repatriates are disproportionately affected by and at risk of unemployment. "Although […] around two-thirds of ethnic German repatriates have several or even many years of professional experience, very few are able to apply their skills in Germany. Professional integration often fails due to a lack of German language skills and computer skills. Only about 21 percent of those surveyed rated their language skills as advanced or very good. 36 percent of the repatriates surveyed stated that they had already spoken German at home".

The theory that adolescents and young adults from immigrant backgrounds are more susceptible to drug use and crime is controversial.

The Landsmannschaft der Deutschen aus Russland (Association of Germans from Russia) emphasizes the opportunities that the immigration of ethnic Germans from Russia to Germany brings, "because they bring young, large families and hardworking people into a society that is increasingly facing the danger of an aging population, and because they certainly don't need to hide their abilities and their willingness to perform".

In 2006, the then Federal Minister of the Interior, Wolfgang Schäuble, commented on the situation, saying: "The noticeable increase in accompanying family members with insufficient language skills and the difficult situation on the labor market in Germany are causing us more problems today than in the past. The majority of resettlers are making efforts to integrate by learning German and taking jobs that are often far below their personal qualifications. […] Unfortunately, we have some problems with a portion of the younger male generation – although I suspect that the portrayals in the media are often exaggerated and one-sided. […] We must counteract this problem with all our strength and together, as best and wherever we can."

In Russia, the situation is viewed more skeptically: "Today, approximately 2.5 million citizens live in the Federal Republic of Germany who immigrated as ethnic German repatriates, late repatriates, or their family members from the states of the former Soviet Union. For many of them, the dream of acceptance and a better life has not been realized in Germany". In the context of this Russian criticism, the government of the Russian Federation adopted a state "Program for the Permanent Repatriation of Russian-Speaking Persons Living Abroad to the Territory of the Russian Federation" (short name: ‘Compatriots Program’) in June 2007. Its aim is to promote the return migration of 300,000 Russian-speaking people from the CIS, Israel, the US, and Germany (late repatriates, Jewish immigrants, and Russian nationals) (by 2009).

Of the ethnic German resettlers, 80 percent or more successfully completed the integration courses they attended (the average for all immigrant groups is approximately 70 percent). In 2007, an average of 23,542 ethnic German resettlers were registered as unemployed (in 1998, 116,871 ethnic German resettlers were registered as unemployed; in 1999, their number was 92,054). While 218,708 German immigrants came to Germany from the Russian Federation between 2000 and 2006, 13,661 returned to Russia during this period.

In numerous German states, special courses for resettlers have been established, although the target groups and admission requirements vary from state to state. These courses generally build upon foreign secondary school qualifications of at least ten years' duration and lead to the Allgemeinen Hochschulreife

or the entrance qualification (Fachhochschulreife) for universities of applied sciences within two years. Supplementary funding to BAföG (Federal Training Assistance Act) is provided, for example, by the Otto Benecke Foundation.

Eisfeld estimates that the integration of late repatriates in Germany has been "largely successful", although for many of those affected it meant a social decline, especially if they did not receive (Anerkennung ausländischer Berufsqualifikationen).

==== People from the former Soviet Union ====
Many Germans from the former USSR also brought non-German family members with them. While at the beginning of the immigration wave, up until the early 1990s, the majority of those in the families felt they belonged to German culture and spoke German, from the fourth phase onward, which continues to this day and was initially characterized by a stabilization and then a continuous limitation of the influx of ethnic Germans, the majority of those arriving have no knowledge of German or only limited knowledge of it.

In some German neighborhoods, Russian is now the predominant language (even among people of German descent). These areas are home to ethnic Germans from Russia, ethnic Russians, members of other ethnic groups from the former Soviet Union, and Jewish quota refugees (Kontingentflüchtlinge). Several independent Russian-language newspapers, such as the daily Rheinskaja Gazeta and the weekly Russkaja Germanija, are now published in Germany; they meet the continuing desire of many immigrants to cultivate the Russian language and culture in Germany.

A German-Russian macaronic language, sometimes spoken among these immigrant groups, is currently emerging. Generally, varying degrees of multilingualism are cultivated, as is the case with the Russian Mennonites who use German, Russian, and Plautdietsch (a German dialect spoken in Russian) in parallel.

A largely unnoticed but relatively large middle class of Germans, however, does not care to be considered "hyphenated Germans" and simply sees themselves as Germans in Germany. Some German students from Russia speak accent-free German at a level required for university studies, as they either came to Germany before starting school or were even born here.

Many people, when using the term "Germans from Russia", ignore those who are not only integrated but fully assimilated, and don't consider that they or their ancestors might have immigrated. However, many Germans from the former Soviet Union place great value on their German ancestry and perceive the label "Russian" as a grave insult.

Recently, some Germans from Russia have been cultivating and using their specific socialization experiences, or those of their ancestors from the former Soviet Union, even in Germany. This includes, on the one hand, their knowledge of Russian, which can constitute a valuable part of their human capital, and on the other hand, cultural traditions acquired in a Russian-dominated environment and knowledge of the country.

In March 2017, the Federal Agency for Civic Education (bpb) organized a conference on the topic of "Emigration, Settlement, Political Participation – Germans from Russia in Interaction with Russian-Speaking Groups in Germany". The Federal Agency thereby assumes that there are fundamental commonalities between the various groups of "post-Soviet migrants". The conference was convened in response to the accusation that many ethnic German repatriates are part of "Putin’s fifth column" in Germany, who are particularly easy to deploy in his "hybrid war" because of their preference for reporting in Russian.

It is little known that, according to the 2011 European Union census on the reference date of 9 May 2011, approximately 570,000 people living in the Federal Republic of Germany held both German and Russian citizenship. These people, who are not offended by being truthfully referred to as "Russians," were not only ethnic German repatriates or late repatriates. The first Russian law on citizenship was passed in November 1991 and stipulated that persons who had their permanent residence in the Russian Federation before the law came into force in February 1992 were automatically recognized as citizens of Russian Soviet Federative Socialist Republic (RSFSR). These persons lose their citizenship (other than through death) only by explicitly renouncing it, something many late repatriates failed to do after moving to Germany. Many considered renouncing their citizenship too expensive and appreciated being able to travel to Russia more easily with their Russian passport. In addition to the number of citizens of Germany and Russia, there are also people with dual citizenship who have entered Germany from another successor state of the Soviet Union. Russian Foreign Minister Sergey Lavrov stated that it was the duty of Russia's policy "to protect its citizens," including those abroad".

Waldemar Eisenbraun, chairman of the Landsmannschaft der Deutschen aus Russland e. V. (Association of Germans from Russia), claims that "the political preferences of Germans from Russia […] hardly differ from those of the majority of the population". For the Handelsblatt, however, it is clear that "[a]venerable […] ethnic Germans from Russia and the CDU/CSU were inextricably linked for decades." Before the refugee crisis, two out of three eligible voters of ethnic German resettlers and late resettlers voted for the CDU or the CSU. Afterwards, it was not the share of votes for Die Linke, the Greens, and the SPD, but rather that of the AfD that increased dramatically, especially among young Germans from Russia. Spiegel Online explains this widespread distrust of established parties by claiming that "one’s own conservative values are no longer in demand in Germany: the traditional family, the grounding in the Christian faith, the preservation of traditional customs." Many ethnic Germans from Russia also held the view that "refugees from the Arab world were received more kindly and receive public benefits that they had to fight hard for." Furthermore, "some internalized xenophobic and Islamophobic attitudes while still in the Soviet Union; they readily believe conspiracy theories propagated by Russian media". However, a study published in October 2016 by the Expert Council of German Foundations on Migration and Integration on the party preferences of migrants shows that (late) resettlers as a whole (i.e., not just ethnic Germans from Russia) have moved closer to the preferences of the population without a migration background. At that time, resettlers and late resettlers were even significantly overrepresented among voters of the Left Party, which casts doubt on the thesis that Germans from Russia are generally more "right-leaning".

According to Hartmut Koschyk, the Federal Government Commissioner for Matters Relating to Ethnic German Resettlers and National Minorities, the integration of ethnic Germans from Russia into German society has been successful. "Especially for ethnic Germans from Russia, who were often treated as foreigners in their ancestral homeland because of their German roots, but also did not believe they could feel at home in Germany because they were considered foreign due to their Russian accent or their Russian origin, the question of their own sense of belonging takes on a particular significance. For many of these late repatriates, the Christian faith is also of identity-forming importance. The secular state does not provide meaning to life; it does not satisfy the transcendental needs of human beings. It is the late repatriates who, due to their predominantly Christian roots and lived religiosity, also serve as a model for their compatriots born in Germany".

Ernst Strohmaier, managing director of the Landsmannschaft der Deutschen aus Russland e. V. (Association of Germans from Russia), confirms that most Germans from Russia are well integrated into German society. However, he criticizes the fact that work with at-risk groups among young Germans from Russia has been neglected since the 1990s. Without "catch-up integration," a parallel society could well emerge in which a minority of Germans from Russia merge with people of genuine Russian descent in Germany. The possibility of these Germans from Russia joining right-wing extremists supported by Russia and "Russian mafia groups" cannot be ruled out.

In light of the Russo-Ukrainian war since 24 February 2022, the question of the loyalty of people who, or whose ancestors, immigrated to Germany from the Soviet Union or one of its successor states, to the Putin regime in Russia arises once again. Jannis Panagiotidis of the University of Vienna, a specialist in post-Soviet migration in Germany, speaks in an interview of a "community" of Russian speakers and of "Germans of Russian descent". Only a minority remain "loyal to Putin," and these are mostly people who "did not speak German upon entering Germany and do not feel truly integrated into German society. They get their information almost exclusively from Russian state media and are particularly exposed to the Kremlin's anti-immigrant and nationalist propaganda." In 2016 (i.e., after Russia's annexation of Crimea), it was found that 17 percent of people from the former Soviet Union were "rather loyal to Russia." Younger people were more inclined than older people to reject authoritarian states in general, including Russia's political system. Panagiotidis also believes it is difficult to make a clear distinction within the community between Russian migrants and Germans from Russia (whom he calls "Russians in exile" and "Russian Germans"), "since in many families one part has a Russian-German background and the other a Russian or Ukrainian one". Panagiotidis assumes that, as a consequence of Russian aggression, the relationship of people with family ties to Russia in the Soviet Union will "cool further".

==== People from Poland ====
Most of the more than 1.4 million ethnic German repatriates who immigrated from Poland arrived between the 1980s and 1991, when immigration from Poland was severely restricted. Even before the fall of the Iron Curtain, the number of Polish citizens leaving West Germany on tourist visas and applying for ethnic German repatriation status upon arrival had increased significantly (1987: 48,419; 1988: 140,226; 1989: 250,340; 1990: 113,253; and 1991: 40,129). The ethnic German repatriates from Poland in the 1980s were mostly socialized in Poland. The proportion of migrants with only Polish language skills during this period is estimated at 80 to 95 percent.

The group of Germans from Poland includes:

- Originally ethnically Polish people who emigrated to the territory of today's Federal Republic of Germany before 1945 and were naturalized here, provided they were not already German citizens at the time of their resettlement (these people, however, did not belong to the late repatriates),
- Ethnic Germans who emigrated to the Federal Republic of Germany after 1945 from the German Reich within the borders of 31 December 1937 territories east of the Oder-Neisse line that belonged to the German Reich in 1937 (German nationals)
- ethnic Germans who immigrated after the Second World War from Danzig or from areas that already belonged to Poland before 1945 (ethnic Germans),
- ethnic Poles who were recognized as a national minority in the German Reich in 1937 and who possessed German citizenship, as well as the descendants of the aforementioned persons.

Ethnic Poles were therefore already considered Germans within the meaning of the Basic Law upon their resettlement in the Federal Republic of Germany, and thus as late repatriates and not as immigrants, if they or their ancestors possessed German citizenship before 1937. Since the concept of "German within the meaning of the Basic law", as formulated in 1949, is based on the borders of the German Reich of 1937, it is assumed that this citizenship theoretically never expired.

== Language use ==
Many statistics list "resettlers" as a category. The strikingly low numbers are explained by the fact that in the official statistics of the German Federal Government, "resettlers" are only listed as such until they have been granted German citizenship. However, in everyday language, a resettled person (who already possesses German citizenship) is often still referred to as a resettler.

=== Refugees and displaced persons ===
Germans who were expelled from the former German eastern territories that were subsequently under foreign administration after the Second World War (1945–1948) are referred to as expellees.

Refugees of Flucht (1944/45), expellees (or, in the terminology of the GDR, " resettlers" (Umsiedler) – 1945–48), and ethnic German repatriates (1957–1992) are all referred to as German Expellees. Until 1992, ethnic German repatriates were also included in the group of expellees. Ethnic German repatriates from the historical German eastern territories already possessed German citizenship, as either their ancestors or they themselves had been citizens of the German Reich within the borders of 31 December 1937.

=== Germans from Russia, Germans from Russia ===
The meaning of the term "Russian Germans," which formerly referred to resettlers and late resettlers from the successor states of the Soviet Union and those still living there, is increasingly narrowing to those Germans who reside permanently in the successor states of the Soviet Union, particularly in Russia, while those who resettled there now predominantly refer to themselves as "Germans from Russia." The self-designation of the Landsmannschaft der Deutschen aus Russland e. V. (Association of Germans from Russia) is particularly influential in shaping this linguistic landscape.

The increasing use of the term "German Russians" for ethnic German repatriates and late repatriates from the successor states of the Soviet Union as an external designation is misleading, unless it is assumed that the people in question are Russians who wish to become German. In fact, from an official German perspective, ethnic German repatriates and late repatriates were already considered German before their resettlement in Germany and must therefore be classified as German even if they converse among themselves in Russian and speak it better than German (→ Russian-speaking population groups in Germany ).

In a 2016 article published by Spiegel Online about "Russian-speaking citizens and Russians living in Germany," the terms "so-called Russian Germans," "German Russians," "Russian-speaking citizens," and "people of Russian descent" are used interchangeably, apparently referring to the same people. The headline even includes them among the "Russians". The article cites an English-language study, "Russians in Germany," published by a Russian institute presented as critical of the Kremlin, which also refers to Germans from Russia (78 percent of respondents were "German Resettlers," i.e., German "repatriates". The article notes that, according to the study, 44 percent of the reference group "consider themselves German".

=== Migrants ===
After Rainer Ohliger had already advocated in 2005 for a differentiated integration of expellees and late repatriates into the general migration history, Panagiotidis argues that all those who have moved from the successor states of the Soviet Union are "migrants" to whom the research methods that are common for other migrant groups (especially from the Mediterranean region) must be applied. According to Panagiotidis, both "unobtrusive integration [and] persistent segregation […] describe the reality of different milieus within the large group of ‘ethnic German repatriates from Russia.’ This large group is necessarily heterogeneous given its size, the diverse backgrounds of its members, and the variety of their socioeconomic circumstances. With this heterogeneity, which will only intensify in the now-adult second generation and the growing third, ethnic Germans from Russia are today first and foremost part of Germany’s diverse migration society (Migrationsgesellschaft). The use of the Russian language and the consumption of Russian food products are just as much a part of this as assimilation into the German middle class while simultaneously maintaining a more or less pronounced awareness of their own ‘other’ origins, or even ‘segmented integration’ in religiously defined communities. Just as with other migrant groups, it is essential to always consider this diversity of experiences and life plans among ethnic Germans from Russia in order to avoid inaccurate, homogenizing stereotypes." to avoid interpretations of their present. In general, Panagiotidis and others warn against "groupism", i.e., against the frequently encountered thought pattern: "A certain person (does not) belong to social group x and therefore (does not) exhibit the characteristic y".

The term "migrants" used to describe ethnic Germans from Russia is met with resistance from representatives of ethnic German resettler associations. Dietmar Schulmeister, state chairman of the Association of Germans from Russia in North Rhine-Westphalia, states: "Germans from Russia are not migrants". The Siebenbürgische Zeitung explains its rejection of the term "migrants" for ethnic German resettlers and late repatriates by arguing that the term almost inevitably carries the connotation of "Ausländer". The essential characteristic of a person of German ethnicity, however, is their "cultural self-understanding as German" already present in their country of origin. The process of moving across national borders is, in the case of ethnic German resettlers and late repatriates, more comparable to the return of ethnic Germans from abroad to Germany, which is also not considered "migration." The newspaper quotes a statement by Chancellor Angela Merkel: "Ethnic German resettlers and late repatriates are Germans and, as such, must be distinguished from foreign migrants".

== International regulations on civil rights for descendants of the nation's people ==
Laws governing the entry of people who, as descendants of their own nation's population (as ethnic minorities), live abroad and acquire, upon entry, the right to participate in the rights (civil rights) exclusively afforded to citizens of the receiving country, exist in many other countries. For example, Greece passed a law allowing people of Greek descent from the former Soviet Union to resettle in Greece. Since then, several hundred thousand former Soviet citizens of Greek descent, primarily from Georgia, Ukraine, and Kazakhstan, have emigrated to Greece. Another example is the Finnish-speaking inhabitants of Ingria in Russia. Similar laws also exist in Japan and Estonia.

Aliyah (the immigration of Jews to Israel) represents a special case, as in this instance the category of "religious affiliation" is inextricably linked to that of "ethnic affiliation." Jews originating from the former Soviet Union were considered an ethnic minority in their country of origin.

== Literature ==
- Ryszard Kaczmarek: Czy jestem Niemcem? Przesiedleńcy z Polski do RFN i NRD w latach 1950–1991. Wydawnictwo literackie, Krakau 2025 (polnisch).
- Ira Peter: Deutsch genug? Warum wir endlich über Russlanddeutsche sprechen müssen. Goldmann, München 2025, ISBN 978-3-442-31777-6.
- Sebastian Klappert: Vertriebenenrecht. Kommentar zum Bundesvertriebenengesetz. In: Decker/Bader/Kothe (Hrsg.): Migrations- und Integrationsrecht, 2021, ISBN 978-3-406-77516-1, S. 2708–2745.
- Victor Dönninghaus, Jannis Panagiotidis, Hans-Christian Petersen (Hrsg.): Jenseits der „Volksgruppe". Neue Perspektiven auf die Russlanddeutschen zwischen Russland, Deutschland und Amerika (= Schriften des Bundesinstituts für Kultur und Geschichte der Deutschen im östlichen Europa, Band 68). De Gruyter Oldenbourg, Berlin 2018, ISBN 978-3-11-050141-4.
- Katrin Zempel-Bley: Erst waren wir Faschisten, dann waren wir Russen. Wie das Anderssein Integration verhindert. In: kulturland oldenburg. Zeitschrift der Oldenburgischen Landschaft, Ausgabe 4/2015, S. 10–15 (online).
- Falk Blask, Belinda Bindig, Franck Gelhausen (Hrsg.): Ich packe meinen Koffer. Eine ethnologische Spurensuche rund um OstWest-Ausreisende und Spätaussiedelnde. Ringbuch Verlag, Berlin 2009, ISBN 978-3-941561-01-4.
- Ferdinand Stoll: Kasachstandeutsche. Migrationsstrategien Kasachstandeutscher im Übergang von ethnischer zu transnationaler Migration – aus der Sicht von Kasachstan. Kisslegg 2007, ISBN 978-3-00-023812-3.
- Christoph Pallaske: Migrationen aus Polen in die Bundesrepublik Deutschland in den 1980er und 1990er Jahren Migrationsverläufe und Eingliederungsprozesse in sozialgeschichtlicher Perspektive. Münster u.a. 2002. [Dissertation, Open Access]. Waxmann. 2002. ISBN 3-8309-1193-9.
- Wilfried Heller, Hans-Joachim Bürkner, Hans-Jürgen Hofmann: Migration, Segregation und Integration von Aussiedlern – Ursachen, Zusammenhänge und Probleme. In: Erlanger Forschungen, Reihe A, Geisteswissenschaften, Band 95, 2002, S. 79–108.
- Alfred Eisfeld: Die Russlanddeutschen. 2. Auflage, Langen Müller, München 1999, ISBN 978-3-7844-2382-1.
- Heinz Ingenhorst: Die Rußlanddeutschen – Aussiedler zwischen Tradition und Moderne. Campus, Frankfurt am Main / New York 1997, ISBN 978-3-593-35731-7.
- Walter Franz Schleser: Rückführung, Aussiedlung und Familienzusammenführung Deutscher aus Ost- und Südosteuropa. Sonderdruck aus Königsteiner Studien, Heft I und II 1984; DNB.

== Films ==
- Andrzej Klamt: Podzielona Klasa – Die geteilte Klasse – Der dt.-poln. Dokumentarfilm von Andrzej Klamt erzählt am Beispiel der Grundschulklasse des Filmemachers die Geschichte schlesischer Spätaussiedler in den 1970er Jahren. Klamt begibt sich auf die Suche nach seinen ehemaligen Klassenkameraden im polnischen Bytom (ehemals Beuthen), die zur Hälfte im kommunistischen Polen geblieben und zur anderen Hälfte nach Westdeutschland ausgewandert sind, und illustriert in Interviews und Filmausschnitten exemplarisch Schicksale und Empfindungen Hunderttausender deutscher Herkunft aus Mittel- und Osteuropa (weitere Infos).

== See also ==
- History of Germans in Russia, Ukraine, and the Soviet Union
- Volga Germans
- Russian Mennonites
- Kyrgyzstan Germans, Sibiriendeutsche
- Baltic Germans
- Black Sea Germans, Dobrujan Germans, Regat Germans, Bukovina Germans, Bessarabia Germans, Galician Germans, Germans in Bulgaria
- Transylvanian Saxons, Satu Mare Swabians, Banat Swabians, Danube Swabians
- Transylvanian Landlers
- Sudeten Germans of Austrian Silesia
- Germans of Yugoslavia
- Vertriebenen- und Aussiedlerseelsorge
- Zipser in Rumänien
- Plautdietsch-Freunde
- Integration of immigrants in Germany
- Demographic change in Germany
