= Russians in Germany =

Ethnic group

Total population
- 3,500,000 (estimate, 2018) Ethnic background: German Russians: 3,500,000–4,000,000: Ethnic Russians: 2,213,000 - Russian Jews: 118,000-225,000 - Russian citizens: 230,994 (2015)

Languages
- Russian, German, German-Russian macaronic, (Hebrew, Yiddish spoken by Russian Jews)

Religion
- Russian Orthodoxy, Atheism, Irreligion, Roman Catholic, Protestantism, Judaism

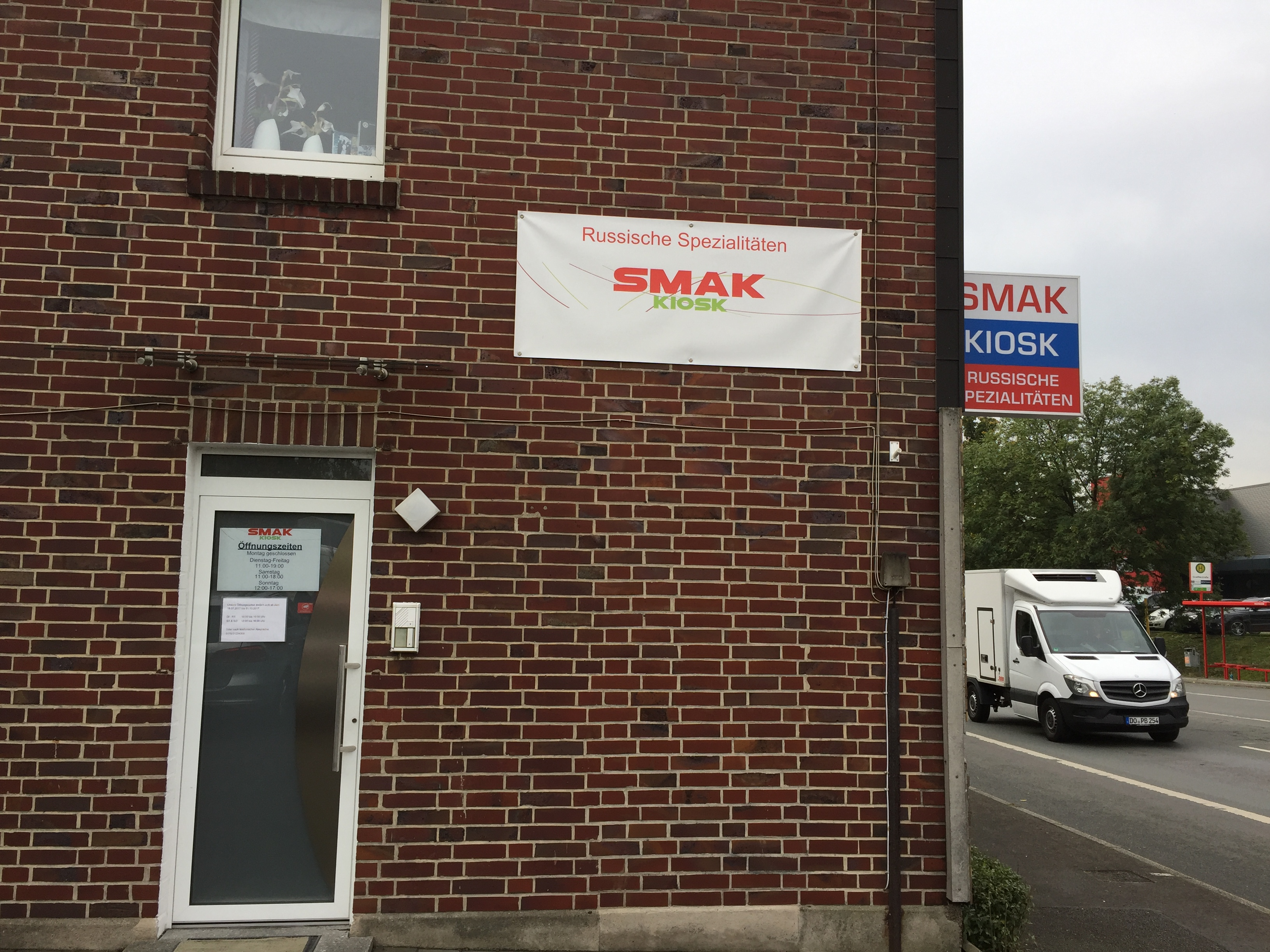
Russian vending kiosk in Waltrop

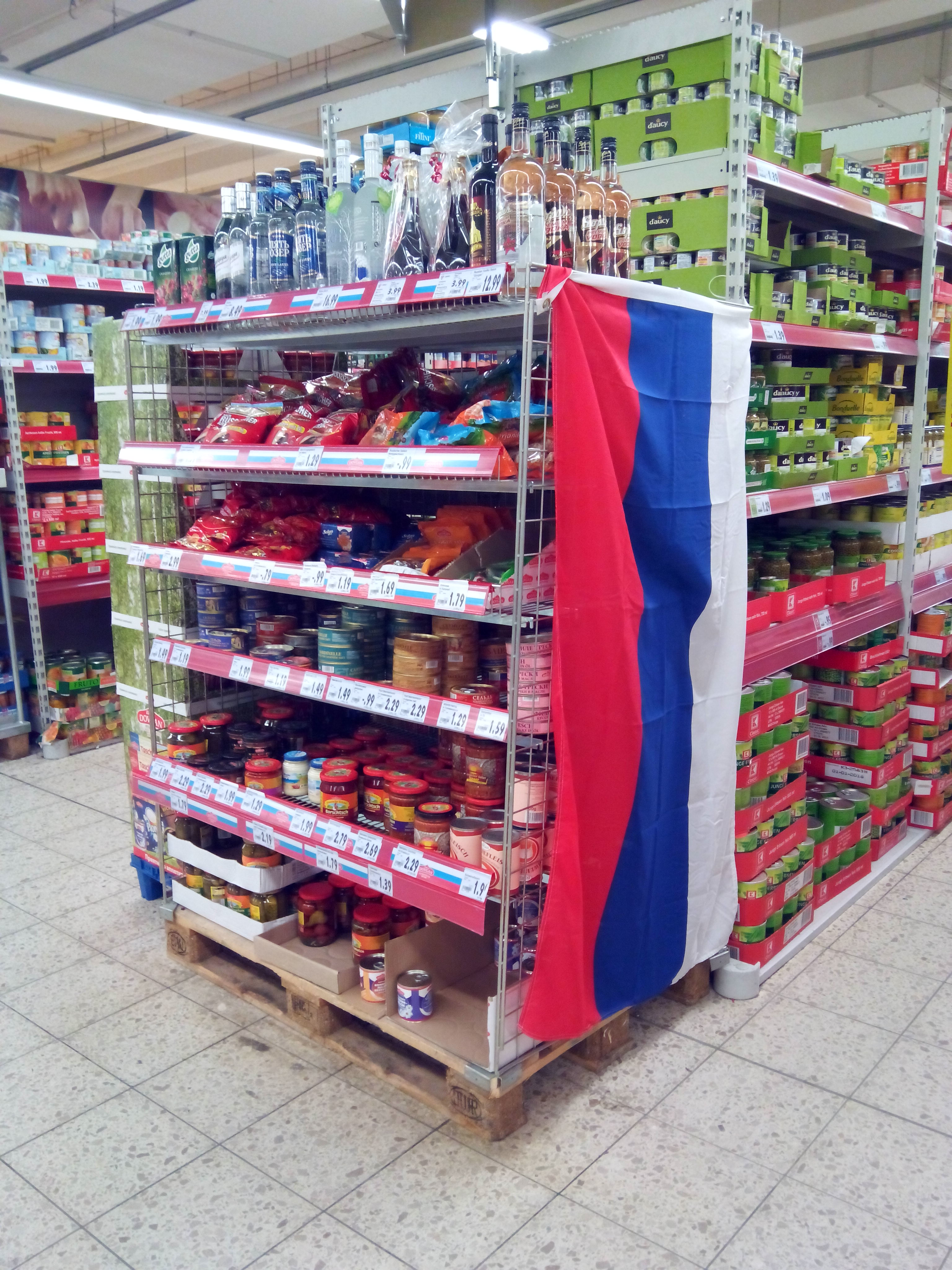
Russian food at a supermarket in Herford

Distribution of Russian citizens in districts of Germany in 2021

There is a significant Russians in Germany (German: Deutschrussen or Russischsprachige in Deutschland; Russian: русские в Германии). The dissolution of the Soviet Union in 1991 triggered mass immigration to the West, with Germany being the top destination, mostly for economic and ethnic reasons. Russians are the third largest migrant group in Germany.

== Soviet and post-Soviet emigration from Russia ==
German population data from 2012 records 1,213,000 Russian migrants residing in Germany—this includes current and former citizens of the Russian Federation as well as former citizens of the Soviet Union. The Russian Ministry of Foreign Affairs reports that about 3,500,000 speakers of Russian live in Germany, split largely into three ethnic groups:

1. ethnic Russians (Russen, Deutschlandrussen)
2. Russians descended from German migrants to the East (known as Aussiedler, Spätaussiedler and Russlanddeutsche (Russian Germans, Germans from Russia))
3. Russian Jews (Russische Juden, Jüdische Russen, Russen jüdischer Abstammung)

Immigration to Germany surged in the late 1980s and early 1990s. According to the Global Commission on International Migration research, "In the 1990s ethnic Germans and Jews comprised the largest components of emigration, and the most attractive destinations were Germany, Israel and the United States." Between 1992 and 2000 Germany is said to have received 550,000 emigrants from Russia, 60% of the total amount emigrating to the three main destinations.

Number of Russians in larger cities
#	City	People
1.	Berlin	26,640
2.	Munich	9,526
3.	Hamburg	9,375
4.	Leipzig	8,793
5.	Braunschweig	8,286
6.	Cologne	4,651
7.	Düsseldorf	4,430
8.	Bonn	3,933
9.	Nuremberg	3,617
10.	Bremen	3,420
11.	Frankfurt	3,176

== Ethnic background ==
=== "Aussiedler" from Russia ===
Earlier in history, particularly during the 17th century, Germans migrated to Russia in significant numbers. Article 116 of Germany's Basic Law was approved in 1949 and this provides individuals of German heritage with the right of return to Germany and the means to acquire German citizenship if they suffered persecution after the Second World War as a result of their German heritage. The 1950s saw a rise in the numbers of people with German ancestry applying to emigrate to Germany under the First Secretary of the Communist Party of the Soviet Union Nikita Khrushchev. According to historian John Glad, by 1957, over 100,000 applications a year to migrate to West Germany were being filed by petitioners, commonly known as "Aussiedler" (singular and plural) or transferred settlers. Several thousand returned in the 1970s, however, the flow of Aussiedler increased with the breakup of the Soviet Union. Between 1992 and 2007, a total of 1,797,084 ethnic Germans from the former USSR emigrated to Germany. Of this total, 923,902 were from Kazakhstan, 693,348 from Russia, 73,460 from Kyrgyzstan, 40,560 from Ukraine, 27,035 from Uzbekistan, and 14,578 from Tajikistan. It is recorded that roughly 3.6 million ethnic Germans moved to West Germany between 1950 and 1996. Annual numbers peaked in 1994, with 213,214 Aussiedler and then gradually began to decline. The number of non-German relatives who emigrated along with them is not known, but many, if not most, are probably counted as members of Germany's ethnic Russian community (see below). The number of Aussiedler fluctuates as many have retained property in the former Soviet republics, and some are presumed to have returned to live there.

=== Soviet Jews ===
The world's fourth largest Russian-Jewish community is in Germany.

After the Second World War Germany's Jewish population was 15,000, a small percentage of the country's pre-war Jewish population of 500,000. That number grew to 30,000 by the late 1980s. Then between 1991 and 2005, more than 200,000 Jews from the former Soviet Union moved to Germany. The Berman Jewish DataBank estimates that over 225,000 Jews from the republics of the former Soviet Union emigrated to Germany between 1989 and 2012. In the beginning of 2006, Germany tightened the immigration program and growth began to diminish. The German government replaced the special quota immigration law (Kontingentsflüchtlingsgesetz) with more restrictive rules (Zuwanderungsgesetz).

The Berman Jewish DataBank estimates "Germany's core Jewish population at 118,000 in 2013," of which all but about 5,000-6,000 are post-Soviet immigrants; the community numbers about 250,000 if non-Halachic-Jewish relatives are included." Sergio DellaPergola estimated with a core Russian-Jewish population of 119,000 and an enlarged population of 250,000 in 2002. A survey conducted in 2007 among approximately 215,000 enlarged Russian Jewish population (taking natural decrease into consideration) indicated that about 81% of the enlarged population was religiously Jewish or Atheist, while about 18.5% identified as Christian. That gives a core Russian Jewish population of 111,800 (religiously Jewish, 52%) or 174,150 (religiously Jewish or Atheist).

Most Russian Jews are Ashkenazi Jews and, alongside Russian, grow up speaking Yiddish, the traditional Judaeo-German language of Ashkenazi Jews. Their fluency in Yiddish enables them to pick up the German language easily once in Germany. This gives them an advantage over other Russian immigrants to Germany who in Russia had only spoken Russian, despite their ethnic German heritage.

Notable Russian Jews in Germany include Valery Belenky, Maxim Biller, Friedrich Gorenstein, Wladimir Kaminer, Lev Kopelev, Elena Kuschnerova, Alfred Schnittke, Vladimir Voinovich, and Lilya Zilberstein.

=== Other Russian speakers ===
Other Russian speakers in Germany fall into a few different categories. The German Statistisches Bundesamt (Federal Statistical Office) reported the following figures for Russian speakers from the year 2000: legal aliens (365,415), political asylees (20,000), students (7,431), family members of German citizens (10,000–15,000), special workers in fields of science and culture (5,000–10,000), and diplomatic corps (5,000). They are family members of returnees (Aussiedler and Soviet Jews), but have yet to receive German citizenship. Many Russian speakers moved to Germany during the existence of the former East Germany (the DDR), and remained after German reunification. This has led to a high concentration of Russian citizens in the new states of Germany.

== Integration into German society ==
Most Russian-Germans have assimilated and integrated quite well into German society. As with most other immigrant groups, there remain some contemporary issues. German authorities have been concerned that the high number of Russian immigrants self-segregating in certain neighborhoods hinders social integration. This has led to restrictions on immigration from Russia and the former Soviet Union. Other issues have included crime, drugs, poverty and unemployment.

The Aussiedler have raised many issues. Although they were expected to assimilate rapidly into German society, Aussiedler and their descendants are struggling with their identity, and most consider themselves Russian. In Russia, due to outside pressure, they had become assimilated into Russian society, in most cases speaking Russian as their first or only language, and this has made their return difficult.

A 2006 study by the German Youth Institute revealed that Russian-Germans face high levels of prejudice and intolerance in Germany, ranging from low job opportunities, to problems in the real estate market.

A 2020 survey found that Aussiedler generally feel more belonging to Germany, their state and even city than their country of origin.

== See also ==
- Germany–Russia relations
- Demographics of Germany
- Russian diaspora
- Russian Prussia
- Germans in Russia
- Russian mafia in Germany
- Ukrainians in Germany
