= Mekki =

Mekki may refer to:

- Adam Mekki (born 1991), English footballer
- Amin Mekki Medani, (born 1942-2018) Sudanese Human Rights Lawyer, President of the Confederation of Sudanese Civil Society, Vice President of Civil Society Initiative, and former President of the Sudan Human Rights Monitor (SHRM).
- Doha Mekki, American antitrust attorney and former Acting Assistant Attorney General
- Hatem El Mekki (1918–2003), Tunisian painter
- Tarak Mekki (born 1958), Tunisian businessman and political figure
- Yusif Kuwa Mekki, (1945–2001) was a Sudanese revolutionary, rebel commander and politician
