= German Expellees =

Germans expelled from USSR annexed territory (1944–1950)

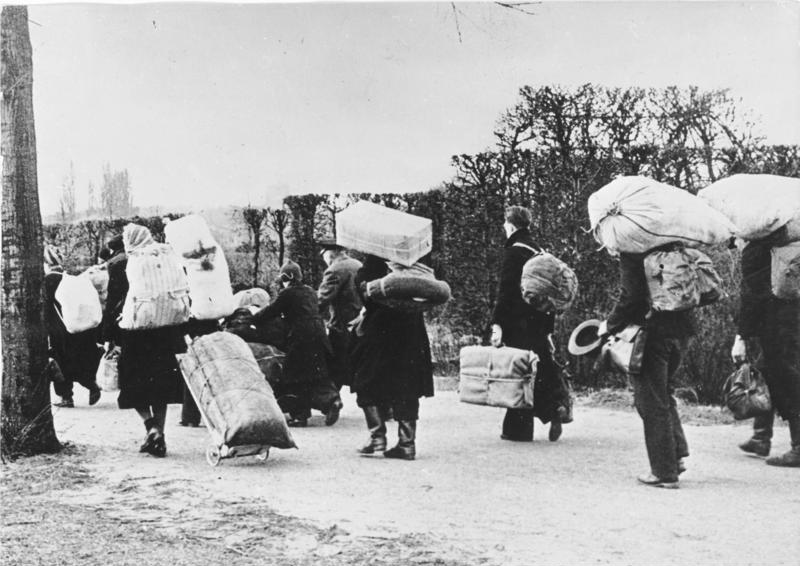
Germans leaving Silesia for Allied-occupied Germany in 1945. Courtesy of the German Federal Archives (Deutsches Bundesarchiv).

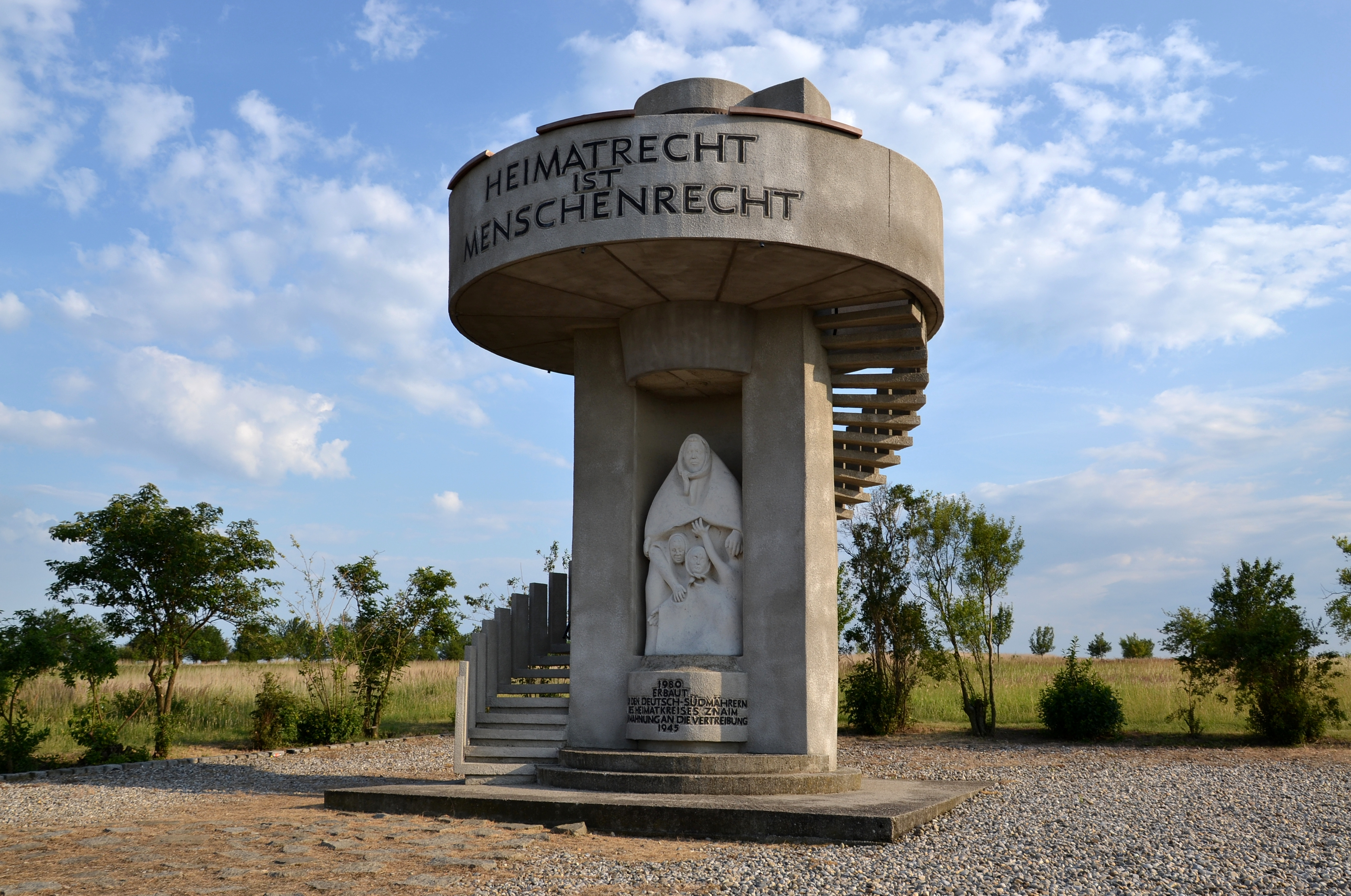
Memorial near the former Znaim to the Sudeten expellees of South Moravia (Kreis Znaim). The text translates as "Homeland rights are human rights."

The German Expellees or Heimatvertriebene (German: [ˈhaɪmaːt.fɐˌtʁiːbənə], "homeland expellees") are 12–16 million German citizens (regardless of ethnicity) and ethnic Germans (regardless of citizenship) who fled or were expelled after World War II from parts of Germany annexed by Poland and the Soviet Union and from other countries (the so-called einheitliches Vertreibungsgebiet, i.e. uniform territory of expulsion), who found refuge in both West and East Germany, and Austria.

Refugees who had fled voluntarily but were later refused permission to return are often not distinguished from those who were forcibly deported. By the definition of the West German Federal Expellee Law, enacted on 19 May 1953, refugees of German citizenship or German ethnicity, whose return to their home places was denied, were treated like expellees, thus the frequent general usage of the term expellees for refugees alike.

Distinguished are refugees and expellees who had neither German citizenship nor German ethnicity but as a matter of fact had fled or been expelled from their former domiciles and stranded in West Germany or West Berlin before 1951. They were taken care of – as part of the displaced persons – by international refugee organisations until 1951 and then by West German authorities granting them the extra status of "heimatloser Ausländer" with preferential naturalisation rules, distinct from other legal aliens or stateless people. Occupational functionaries and other German expatriates, who had moved to German-annexed or German-occupied foreign territory only due to the war were not considered expellees by law unless they showed circumstances (such as marrying a resident of the respective area) providing for the intention to settle abroad also for the time after the war. Besides the narrow legal definition for the Heimatvertriebene, there were also other groups accepted as Vertriebene (expellees) such as the Aussiedler. These comprised refugees and emigrants either originally of foreign citizenship but of German ethnicity, or who themselves or whose ancestors had involuntarily lost German citizenship, coming from the above-mentioned uniform territory of expulsion or from Albania, Bulgaria, China, Romania, the Soviet Union, or Yugoslavia, and arriving only after the end of general expulsions but not later as 31 December 1992.

In a document signed in 1950 the Heimatvertriebene organisations recognised the plight of the different groups of people living in today's Poland who were resettled there by force. The Heimatvertriebene are just one (but by far the largest) of the groups of millions of other people, from many countries, who all found refuge in today's Germany.

Some of the expellees are active in politics and belong to the political right wing. In West Germany in 1950, a special expellee party - All-German Bloc/League of Expellees and Deprived of Rights (GB/BHE) was founded, that was active in the 1950s. Many others do not belong to any organizations, but they continue to maintain what they call a lawful right to their homeland. The vast majority pledged to work peacefully towards that goal while rebuilding post-war Germany and Europe.

The expellees are still highly active in German politics, and are one of the major social groups of the nation, with around 2 million members. A president of the Federation of Expellees was a member of the Bundestag. Although expellees and their descendants were active in West German politics, the prevailing political climate within West Germany was that of atonement for Nazi actions. However, the CDU governments have shown considerable support for the expellees and German civilian victims.

== Expellee towns ==
As a result of the huge influx of expellees, there was a massive increase of population in some areas such as Mecklenburg (where population numbers doubled), and in some places the previous homogeneity of the population was broken by Protestant expellees moving to a purely Catholic area or vice versa. The population numbers of a number of small settlements in West Germany exploded permanently due to a refugee camp on their territory or nearby. Examples of this phenomenon include Neugablonz, a quarter of Kaufbeuren in Bavaria, founded by the expellees and named after Gablonz (Jablonec nad Nisou). Neugablonz nowadays makes up a third of the town's population. An extreme example of the population explosion is Neutraubling (also in Bavaria), which had 53 inhabitants in 1947, 1300 in 1951, and 3800 in 1960. Since the refugee camps were mostly located on the sites of former hidden ammunition factories, most of these Vertriebenenstädte are located in a (former) forest. See also Espelkamp.

== See also ==
- Aussiedler (de:Aussiedler)
- Flight and evacuation of German civilians during the end of World War II
- Flight and expulsion of Germans (1944–1950)
- Federation of Expellees
- Glossary of the Third Reich

== Gallery ==
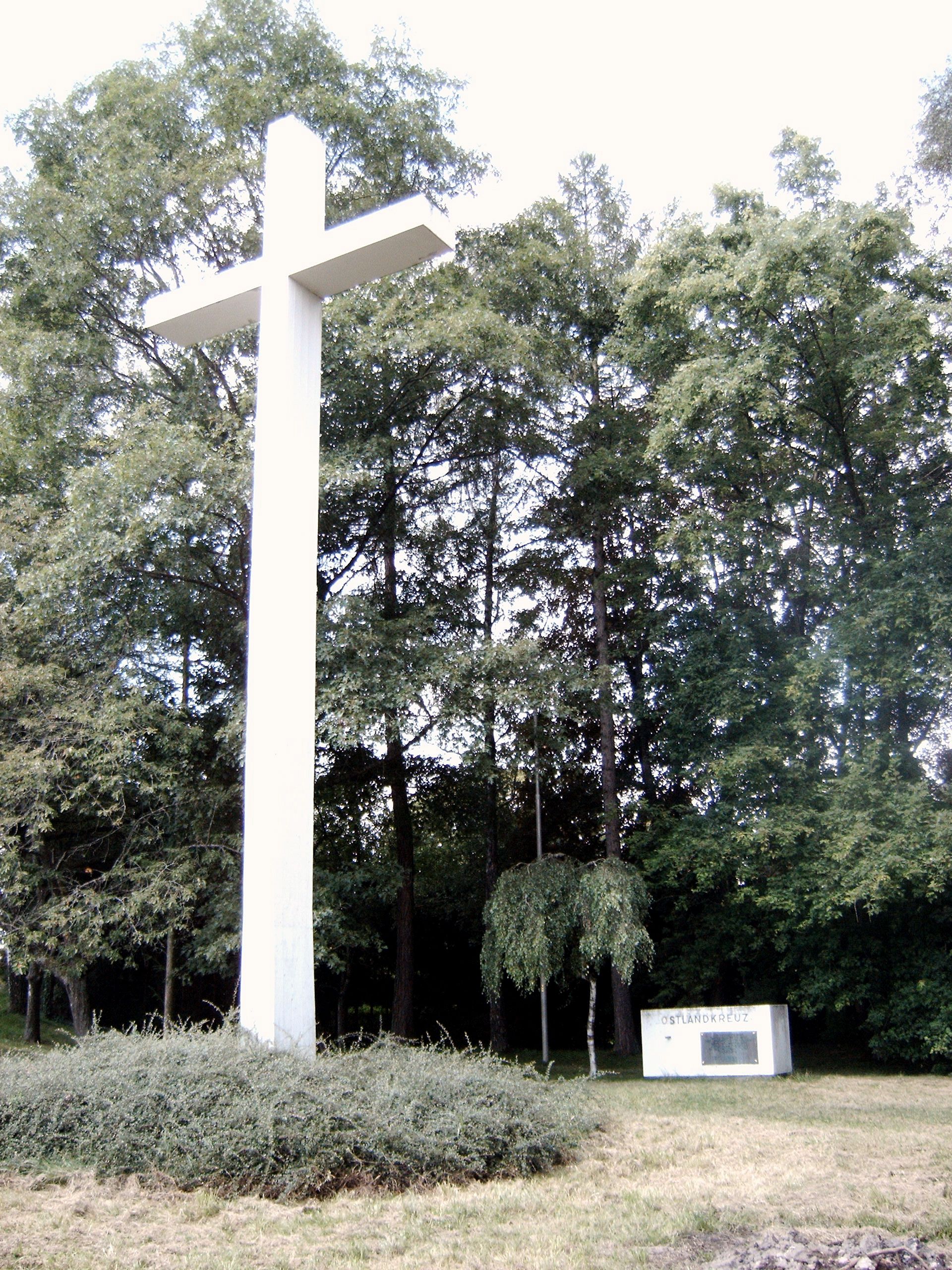
Ostlandkreuz between Schorndorf and Winterbach

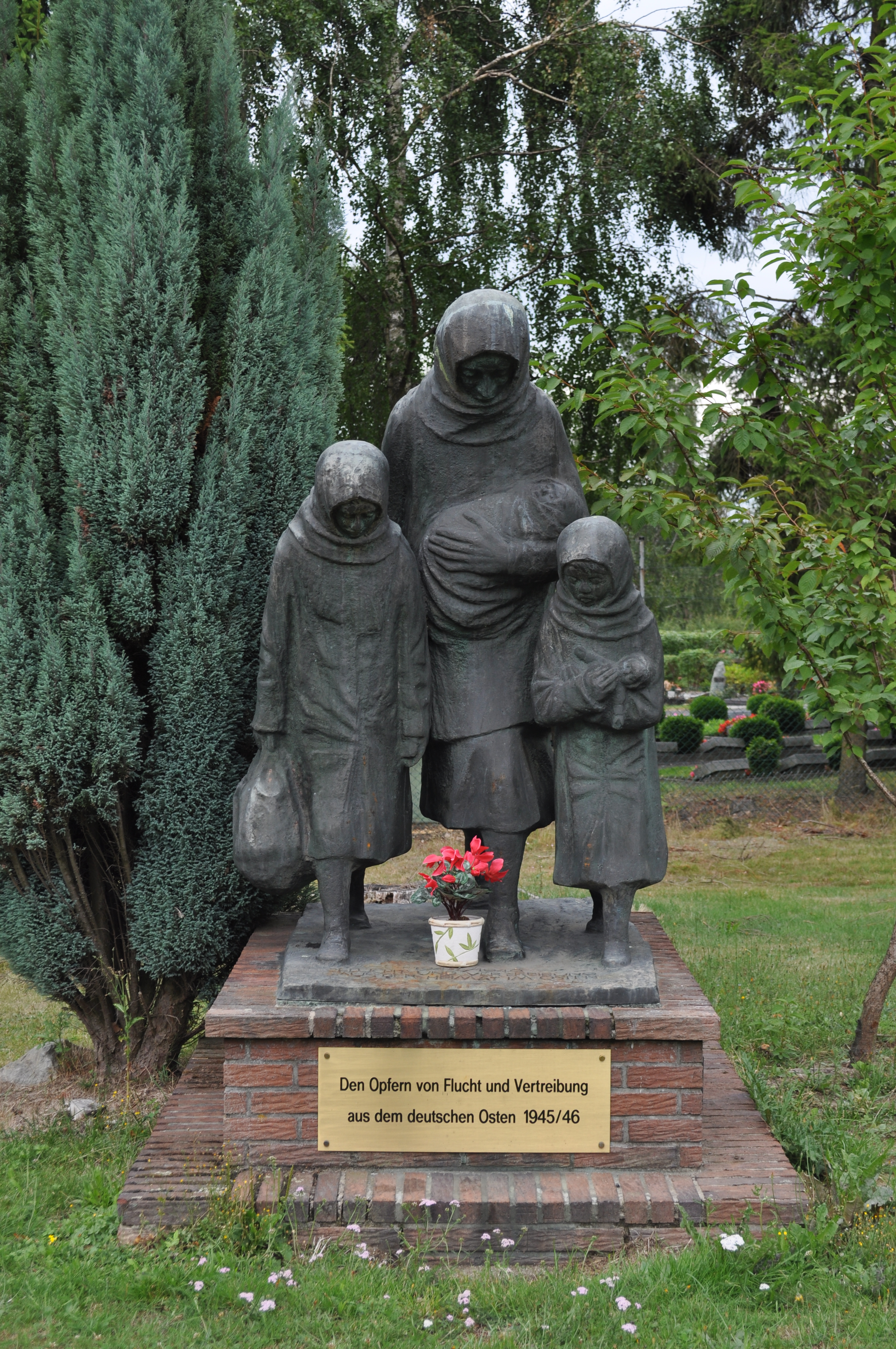
Memorial in Oberursel

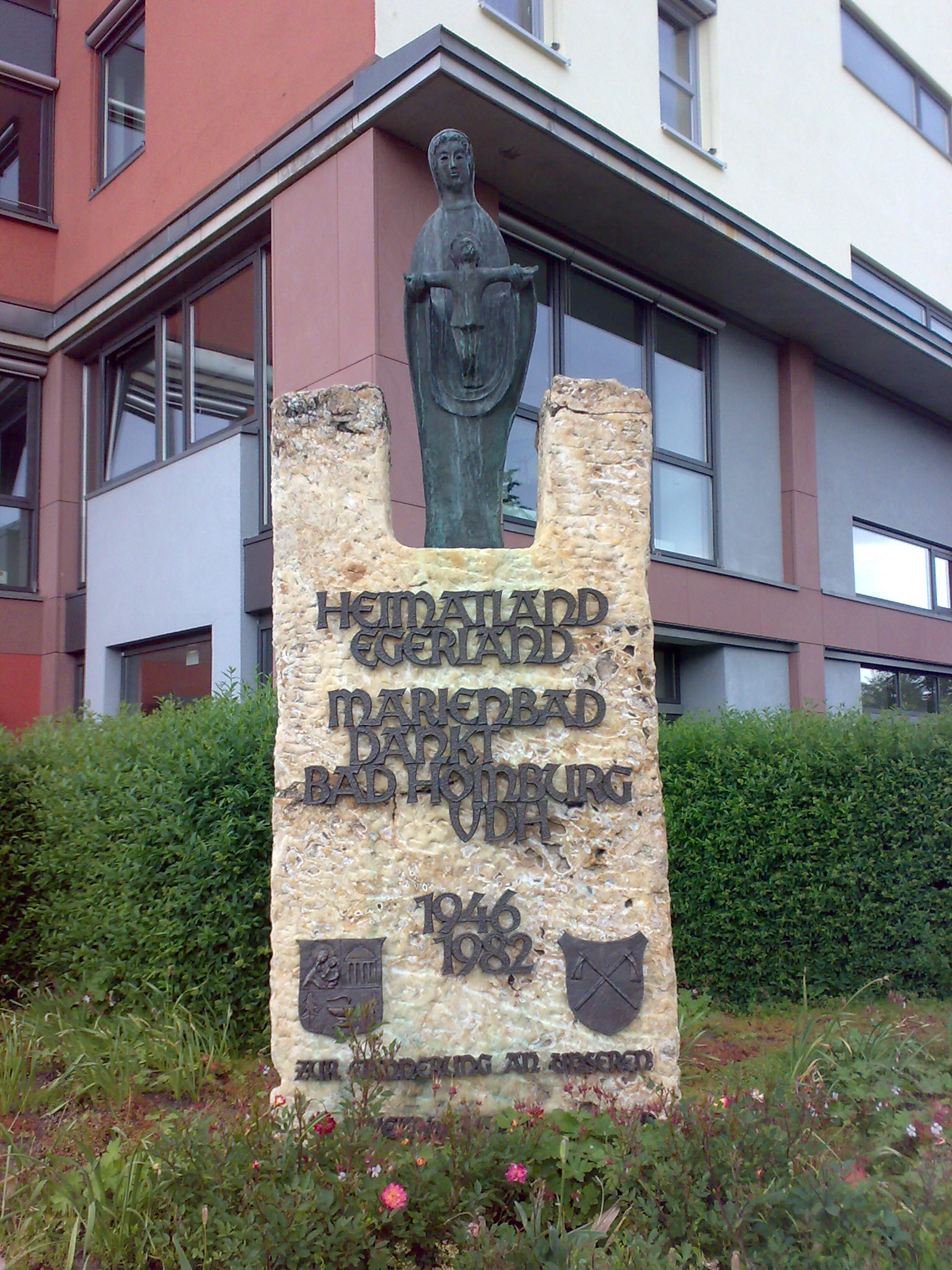
Memorial in Bad Homburg vor der Höhe
