= Panagiotidis =

Panagiotidis (Greek: Παναγιωτίδης) is a Greek surname. Notable people with the surname include:

- Aristotelis Panagiotidis (born 1997), Greek footballer
- Jannis Panagiotidis (born 1981), German historian
- Nikos Panagiotidis (born 1979), Swedish-Greek singer
