= Big Bertha (cow) =

Oldest cow ever

Big Bertha (17 March 1945 – 31 December 1993) was an Irish cow who held two Guinness World Records: she was the oldest cow recorded, dying just three months short of her 49th birthday, and she also held the record for lifetime breeding, having produced 39 calves. During her lifetime she helped raise £75,000 for cancer research and other charities.

== Life ==
Big Bertha was born in Ireland on 17 March 1945, St Patrick's Day. Her breed has been given as either Droimeann (a native Irish cattle breed), or Friesian. She was bought at a cattle fair by farmer Jerome O'Leary and lived at his farm near the market town of Sneem in County Kerry, southwest Ireland.

Big Bertha held two Guinness World Records: she was the oldest cow recorded, dying just three months short of her 49th birthday, and she also held the record for lifetime breeding, having produced 39 calves. However, by 2006, the categories had been dropped from the Guinness Book of World Records.

Due to her record-breaking status, Big Bertha became a local celebrity. Her appearances at cattle fairs helped raise £75,000 for cancer research and other charities, and she would lead the St Patrick's Day parade in Sneem to aid with fundraising. Before her appearances at the noisy parades, O'Leary would feed Big Bertha whiskey to steady her nerves. After her death on New Year's Eve 1993, a wake was held for her in a pub, the Blackwater Tavern at Raycoslough, Blackwater, in County Kerry. On Big Bertha's death, O'Leary still had several of her offspring in his herd, the oldest of whom was then 35.

Following her death, Big Bertha was stuffed, and now resides at a farm at Beaufort in County Kerry.
