= Federal Expellee Law =

1953 West German law on ethnic German refugees

The Federal Law on Refugees and Exiles (German: Gesetz über die Angelegenheiten der Vertriebenen und Flüchtlinge, lit. 'Law on the affairs of the expellees and refugees'; abbr. Bundesvertriebenengesetz, BVFG) is a federal law passed by the Federal Republic of Germany on 19 May 1953 to regulate the legal situation of ethnic German refugees and expellees who fled or were expelled after World War II from the former eastern territories of the German Reich and other areas of Central and Eastern Europe. The law was amended on 3 September 1971.

The major force behind the law was the All-German Bloc/League of Expellees and Deprived of Rights party, which had among its supporters – besides German citizens, who had fled or were expelled from formerly German territory annexed by Poland and the Soviet Union – many formerly non-citizens, who experienced by the end of World War II and the post-war years of ethnic cleansing, denaturalisation, robbing and humiliation (1945–1950) carried out by the governments of Czechoslovakia, Hungary, Poland, Romania, and Yugoslavia.

== Provisions ==
The law applies to refugees and exiles (also known as expellees), which it defines as a German citizen or an ethnic German who resided in the former eastern territories of the German Reich, "located temporarily under foreign administration", or in areas outside the German Reich as at 31 December 1937, who as a result of the events of World War II suffered expulsion, in particular by removing or escape. Those expellees who were not already German nationals became entitled to German citizenship. The law did not apply to German nationals, including expellees and refugees from other countries, who at the time the Federal Republic of Germany was founded in 1949, were entitled to German citizenship under the 1913 nationality law and under Article 116 (2) of the Basic Law (federal constitution), but rather to ethnic Germans who only later managed to escape persecuting states and were entitled to German citizenship under the 1913 law.

The law also contained a heredity clause entitling children of expellees to inherit German ethnicity and citizenship: "If one parent was a German citizen or ethnic German residing on December 31, 1937, or earlier, in the areas of exile..." Inheriting the status of "expelled" resulted in an increase in the number of persons covered by the Act. According to the statistical yearbook, in 1971 in West Germany there were 8.96 million "expellees" under the law who could apply for a document certifying this classification (German: Bundesvertriebenenausweis; i.e. Federal Expellee Card).

The law also recognises as refugees and expellees entitled to German citizenship refugees from Germany, who emigrated or were expelled after 30 January 1933 to flee factual or impending persecution on the grounds of their political opposition, their racial classification, their religion or philosophy of life (Weltanschauung).

The persons entitled to German citizenship also include (former) foreign citizens of states of the Eastern Bloc, who themselves – or whose ancestors – were persecuted or discriminated between 1945 and 1990 for their German or alleged German ethnicity by their respective governments. The argument goes that the Federal Republic of Germany had/has to administer to the needs of these foreigners, because their respective governments in charge of guaranteeing their equal treatment as citizens, severely neglected or contravened that obligation.

== See also ==
- German Law of Return
- German nationality law
- Aussiedler and Spätaussiedler
