= Western Germany =

Western Germany may refer to:

- Areas in the geographical west of Germany, such as the federal states of North Rhine-Westphalia, Rhineland-Palatinate and Saarland
- West Germany, the common name for the Federal Republic of Germany from 1949 to 1990, when the country was divided from East Germany
- The old states of Germany, a phrase denoting the existing states of West Germany prior to 1990, which continued in the reunified Federal Republic of Germany after 1990 – the ten "old states" were joined by the five "new states" in the east, plus the reunified Berlin

== See also ==
- West Central German, a dialect of the German language
- Allied-occupied Germany (1945–1949), the occupation zones after World War II that became West Germany
- Western German Football Association, the current regional association for North Rhine-Westphalia
  - Western German Cup (1949–1974), run by the regional association
- Western German football championship (1903–1933), held in western areas of the German Empire
