= German-Russian macaronic language =

The German-Russian pidgin is a macaronic language of mixed German and Russian that appears to have arisen in the early 1990s. It is sometimes known as Deutschrussisch in German or Nemrus in Russian. Some speakers of the mixed language refer to it as Quelia. It is spoken by some russophone immigrants in Germany from the former Soviet Union.

== Grammar ==
Russian acts as the linguistic substratum, supplying the syntactic structure into which German words are inserted. The German content varies from speaker to speaker, but can be as high as 50% of the vocabulary. The situation is somewhat akin to Spanglish in the United States.

Gender may be influenced by Russian genders, as in the case of most words ending in '-ung', which are always feminine in German, but usually masculine in the mixed language because Russian nouns ending in a hard consonant are always masculine. However, some words inherit their gender from the German noun, as in the feminine какая хорошая [kakaja xoroʂaja] from German feminine die Überraschung, meaning 'surprise'.

A mixed language makes greater use of the uncommon Russian auxiliary verbs иметь [imʲetʲ], meaning 'to have' and быть [bɨtʲ], meaning 'to be'. The corresponding verbs (haben and sein respectively) are very common in German.

German verbs are often treated in a sentence as though they were Russian verbs, being russified by replacing the German infinitive verb ending. -(e)n with the Russian -tʲ. For example, German spüren becomes шпюрить [ʂpʲuritʲ] - 'to feel', or spielen becomes шпилить, 'to play'.

The following features vary from speaker to speaker:

- Adopting the German terms for certain everyday items, particularly if the word has fewer syllables than the Russian equivalent.
- Adopting the German terms for the realities of immigrant life, such as Arbeitsamt ('labor office'), Sozial (a shortening of Sozialhilfe, meaning 'social assistance'), Termin (date), Vertrag (contract).
- Literal translation of Russian terms or phrases into German (calques).
- Using the German pronunciation of proper names rather than the 'Russified' pronunciation based on the Cyrillic rendering which may reproduce the now-dialectal 18th-century pronunciation, Yiddish or just transliterate from Latin script. For example, in Russian 'Einstein' is written 'Эйнште́йн', and pronounced [ɛjnʂˈtɛjn] (as in Yiddish). But in this mixed language would be pronounced [ˈajnʂtajn], the German pronunciation of Einstein. Also [lʲajpt͡sɪk] (Ляйпциг) for 'Leipzig' instead of the russified lʲɛjpt͡sɪk' (Лейпциг), and [frojd] for 'Freud' instead of [frɛjd] (as in many German dialects).
- There is at least one example of a neologism. Arbeits'слёзы, pronounced arbaytslyozy, could be a form of the German word Arbeitslosengeld (meaning 'unemployment pay'). The word has undergone an interesting phonetic and semantic shift. Casual or incomplete articulation of Arbeitslosengeld may be vocally realized as Arbeitslose, meaning 'an unemployed person', but the word takes on a new meaning because the Russian word слёзы (sljozy) means 'tears'. The resulting word in a mixed language, Arbeits'слёзы, means 'unemployment pay' but it might be better translated as 'unemployment pain'.
