= Tarak Mekki =

Tunisian businessman (1958–2012)

- Born: 27 June 1958; Tunis, Tunisia
- Died: 31 December 2012 (aged 54); Hammamet
- Occupation: Political figure

Tarak Mekki (طارق المكي 27 June 1958 – 31 December 2012) was a Tunisian businessman and political figure. He declared himself as an opponent to the president Zine El Abidine Ben Ali and a candidate to his succession. Mekki was one of the few political opponents calling for an immediate end to the Ben Ali regime, and his prosecution for corruption and torture.

Mekki was born in Tunis. he embraced many of Tunisia's first president Habib Bourguiba's foreign policies which called for a pragmatic solution to the Israeli-Palestinian conflict and closer ties with Western countries. He presented himself as moderate and quickly distanced himself from other political opponents including Islamists.

After 12 June 2007, Mekki posted his speeches online revealing the foundation of his presidential programme. He called for the birth of a "Second Tunisian republic" where rights would be guaranteed to all Tunisians. According to him, this was the only alternative to the then existing regime.

Mekki claimed that women had been wearing veils as a mean of silent political protests rather than true religious conviction. Mekki proposed to fight the "real" roots of Islamic terrorism and blamed President Ben Ali's policies for the rise of extremists. This could also just have been a ploy to gain support in the West, as Ben Ali had similarly proclaimed to be fighting terrorism.

Mekki's team produced a series of political comic sketches called "Mille et une nuits" (engl. "One Thousand and One Nights or Elf Leila w Leila") in which he ridiculed President Zine El-Abidine Ben Ali, his wife Leila Trabelsi-Ben Ali, and the Trabelsi family – the name of the sketches themselves a jab at the president's wife.

From 8 June 2008, his speeches were broadcast online on various websites including YouTube and Dailymotion as well as via satellite on Nilesat every Monday evening in Tunisia. Mekki died, aged 54, in Hammamet.
