= Jannis Panagiotidis =

German historian

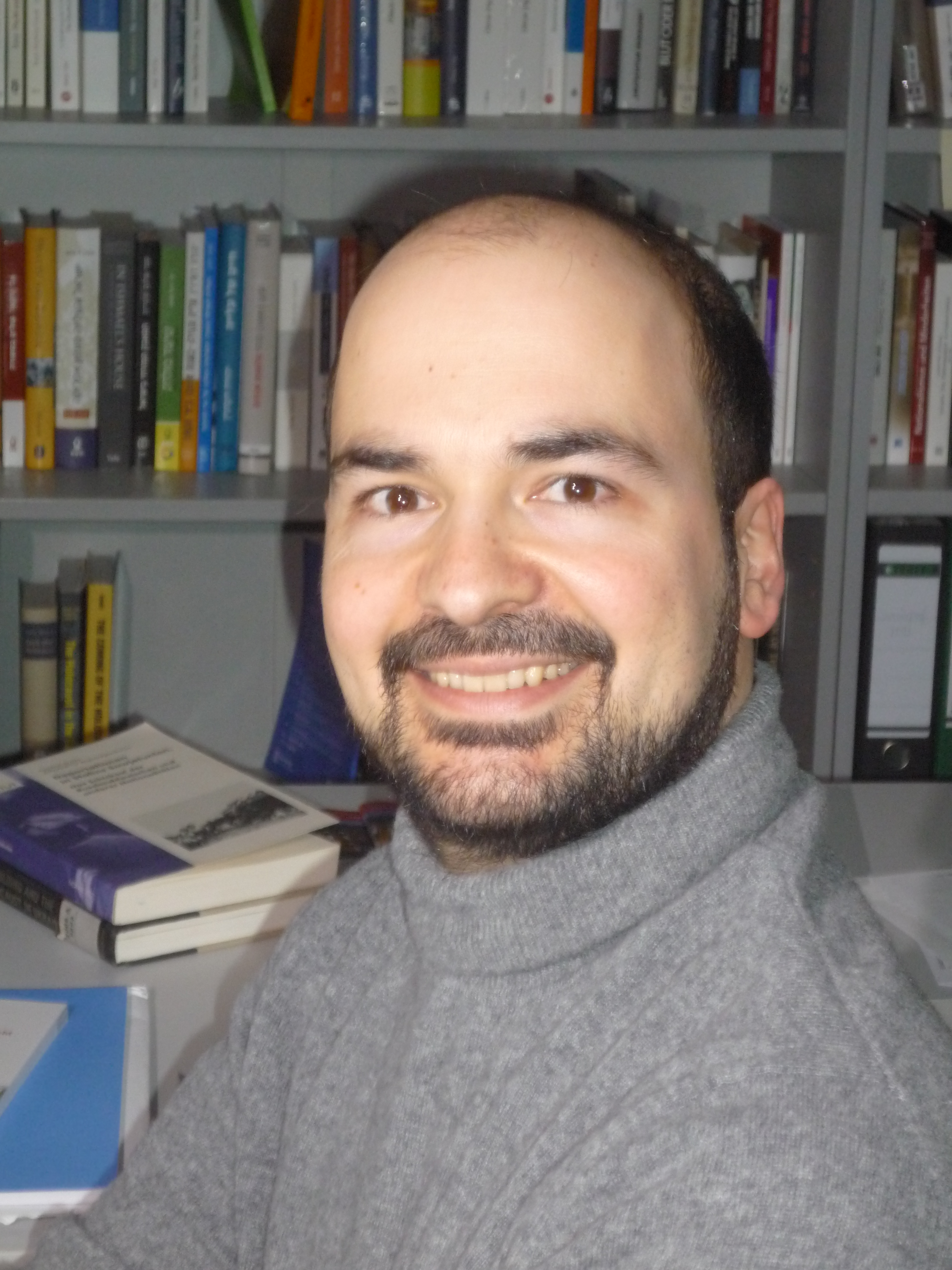
- Born: 6 March 1981 (age 45); Korbach, Germany

Academic background
- Education: European University Institute (PhD)

Academic work
- Discipline: Historian
- Institutions: Research Center for the History of Transformations (RECET), University of Vienna

Jannis Panagiotidis is a German historian specializing in migration studies and the history of Russia Germans. Since August 2020, he is the Scientific Director at the Research Center for the History of Transformations (RECET) at the University of Vienna.

== Early life and education ==
Jannis Panagiotidis studied Eastern European History and International Relations at the University of Tübingen and the University of Athens, receiving a PhD in 2012 from the European University Institute in Florence, Italy. His dissertation "Laws of Return? Co-Ethnic Immigration to West Germany and Israel (1948-1992)”, was supervised by the later holder of the Wittgenstein Award Philipp Ther.

== Academic career ==
He spent time as Manfred Lahnstein Fellow at the Bucerius Institute for Research of Contemporary German History and Society at the University of Haifa, Israel, as Junior Fellow at Imre-Kertész-Kolleg, University of Jena, and as DAAD Returning Scholar at Friedrich-Meinecke-Institut, Free University of Berlin.

In 2014, he was appointed Junior Professor for Migration and Integration of Russia Germans at the Institute for Migration Research and Intercultural Studies (IMIS), Osnabrück University. Since August 2020, he is the Scientific Director at the Research Center for the History of Transformations (RECET) at the University of Vienna, where he researches liberal global orders and freedom of movement.

He leads a project within the research network "Ambivalences of the Soviet" funded by the Volkswagen Foundation. He also co-edits the Journal of Migration Studies and the Journal for Culture and History of the Germans in Eastern Europe.

Pertti Ahonen described his first monograph "The Unchosen Ones: Diaspora, Nation, and Migration in Israel and Germany" as "essential reading for anyone interested in contemporary migration history". Peter Polak-Springer praised it as "a masterfully analyzed, well written, and pathbreaking contribution to global and comparative history of ethnic nationalism and return migration".

Panagiotidis's newest book "Postsowjetische Migration in Deutschland: Eine Einführung" (in German) has been described as a "pioneering contribution" (German original: "wegweisender Beitrag") in the understanding of the discrepancies between normative categories created by migration policies and the real-life self-identifications of migrants. Panagiotidis has also been praised for the unusual consideration he gives to own views and sensitivities of the migrant group(s) he writes about.

In December 2022, he was awarded a special distinction for his work in the field of Anti-Slavism studies by the Berlin Polish Social Council.

== Selected works ==
Monographs:

- Panagiotidis, Jannis; Petersen, Hans-Christian (2024). Antiosteuropäischer Rassismus in Deutschland: Geschichte und Gegenwart. Weinheim: Beltz Juventa. ISBN 978-3-7799-6823-8.
- Panagiotidis, Jannis (2021). Postsowjetische Migration in Deutschland: eine Einführung. Weinheim: Beltz Juventa. ISBN 9783779939139.
- Panagiotidis, Jannis (2019). The Unchosen Ones: Diaspora, Nation, and Migration in Israel and Germany. Bloomington: Indiana University Press. ISBN 9780253043610.

Other works (selection):

- Johnston, Rosamund T.; Panagiotidis, Jannis; Baran-Szołtys, Magdalena; Calori, Anna; Nguyen Vu, Thuy Linh; Peng, Sheng; Schacht, Anastassiya; Ther, Philipp (eds.) (2024). The Routledge Handbook of 1989 and the Great Transformation. London: Routledge. ISBN 9781032301082.
- Panagiotidis, Jannis; Petersen, Hans-Christian (eds.) (2025). Antiosteuropäischer Rassismus. Vermessungen eines Forschungsfeldes / Anti-East European Racism. Surveying a Field of Research. Thematic issue of Journal für Kultur und Geschichte der Deutschen im Östlichen Europa (JKGE), 6.
- Flack, Anna; Musekamp, Jan; Panagiotidis, Jannis; Petersen, Hans-Christian (eds.) (2024). Russian Germans on Four Continents: Histories of a Global Diaspora. Lanham: Lexington Books. ISBN 9781666911718.
- Panagiotidis, Jannis (2020). The power to expel vs. the rights of migrants: expulsion and freedom of movement in the Federal Republic of Germany, 1960s—1970s. In: Citizenship Studies 24, vol. 3, 301– 318. https://doi.org/10.1080/13621025.2020.1714876.
- Panagiotidis, Jannis; Wagner, Florian (eds.) (2023). Ausweisen – Rückführen – Abschieben. Thematic issue of Zeithistorische Forschungen 20/2023, 1.
- Panagiotidis, Jannis; Ens, Kornelius; Petersen, Hans-Christian (eds.) (2023). Diktatur – Mensch – System: Russlanddeutsche Erfahrungen und Erinnerungen. Paderborn: Brill Schöningh. ISBN 978-3-506-79176-4.
- Dönninghaus, Victor; Panagiotidis, Jannis; Petersen, Hans-Christian (2018). Jenseits der "Volksgruppe": Neue Perspektiven auf die Russlanddeutschen zwischen Russland, Deutschland und Amerika. Berlin: De Gruyter Oldenbourg. ISBN 9783110501414.
