= Russian Prussia =

Periods of Prussian history while under Russian control (1758-63, 1945-present)

Russian Prussia refers to two periods in the history of Prussia. Since 1991 Russian Prussia has been a synonym for Kaliningrad Oblast.

== 18th century ==
During the Seven Years' War parts of Prussia briefly came under Russian control and were governed by Russian governors. Imperial Russian troops occupied East Prussia at the beginning of 1758. On December 31, 1757, Empress Elizabeth I of Russia issued a ukase about the incorporation of Königsberg into Russia. On January 24, 1758, the leading burghers of Königsberg submitted to Elizabeth. Five Imperial Russian general-governors administered the city during the war from 1758–62; the Russian army did not abandon the town until 1763.

== After World War II ==
The Soviet leader Stalin decided to incorporate the northern part of East Prussia into the Soviet Union. Klaipėda Region became part of the Lithuanian SSR, while Kaliningrad Oblast was associated with the Russian Soviet Federative Socialist Republic. With the end of the Soviet Union in 1991 and the independence of Lithuania and Belarus Kaliningrad Oblast became an exclave of Russia.
