= Recession of 1958 =

Sharp worldwide economic downturn in 1958

The recession of 1958, also known as the Eisenhower Recession, was a sharp worldwide economic downturn in 1958. The effect of the recession spread beyond the United States to Europe and Canada, causing many businesses to shut down. Officially, recessionary circumstances lasted from the middle of 1957 to April 1958. Though it is generally regarded as a moderate recession, it was the most significant recession during the post–World War II economic expansion between 1945 and 1973.

== Causes ==
There were many major factors in the decline that exerted a growing downward pressure on production and employment, resulting in a general reduction of economic activity.

New car sales took a sharp dive as middle-class consumers decided to keep their cars for longer instead of upgrading after a few years. Auto sales fell 31% over 1957, making 1958 the worst auto year since World War II. In just three years, car sales fell from almost 8 million purchases in 1955 to 4.3 million purchases in 1958.

Housing construction slowed due to higher interest rates in 1955 and 1956. By 1957, new house construction had fallen to about 1.2 million units.

There was a gradual decrease in incoming business of capital goods industries, which resulted in the ending of an expansive boom. The initial trouble began in 1956 with a deceleration in business planning for replacement of equipment and expansion of manufacturing facilities, resulting in a drop in new orders for equipment. This created a widening gap between the supply and the use of industrial capacity. Federal Reserve economists believed that the Eisenhower administration had contributed to the recession by cutting back on United States Department of Defense purchases in 1957.

== Effects ==
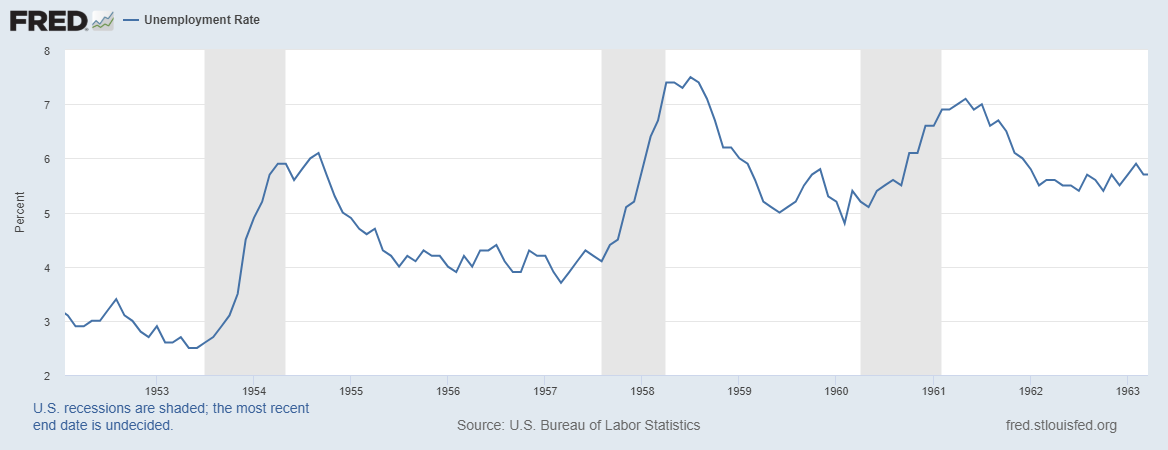
US unemployment rate, 1952–1963

Durable goods manufacturing fell, and lumber, mining, and textiles were three of the industries that were hit the hardest. Due to a severe drop in unfulfilled orders for durable goods and a decreasing demand for commodities and other materials, the recession of 1958 forced over five million people out of work.

In the United States, unemployment rose but there was little to no decline in personal income. Overall, employment decreased by 6.2%, resulting in 2 million job losses and 1.3 million people drawing unemployment insurance. Unemployment was highest in industrial areas in the Northeast and Midwest and in mining areas in Pennsylvania, West Virginia and the West. Michigan suffered the most of any state with an unemployment rate of 11%, as Detroit maintained a record high of 20%. In large part, this was a result of a 47% decline in automobile production. When unemployment rates rose beyond 5.1 million in January 1958, they were higher than at any point since 1941.

=== Price and costs ===
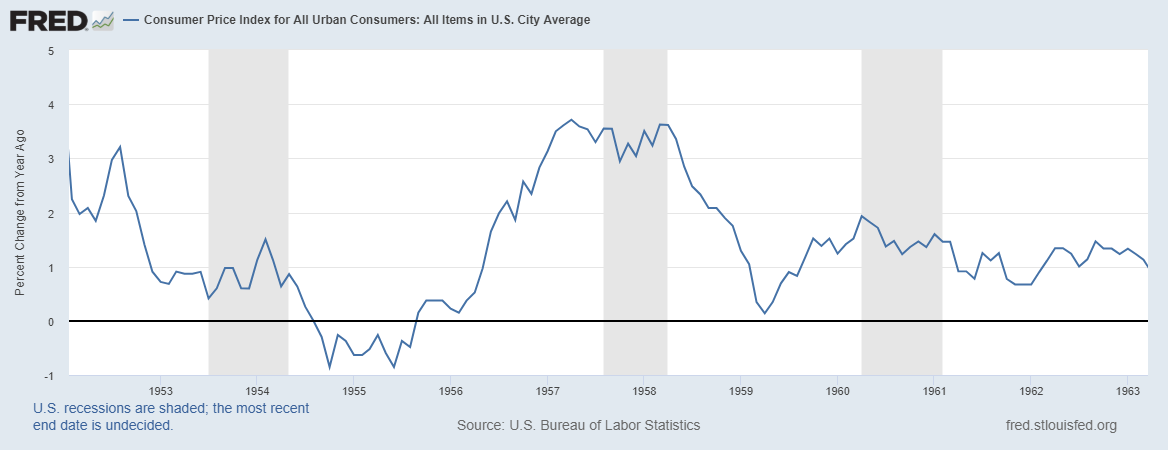
Percent annual change in the US Consumer Price Index, a measure of inflation, 1952–1963

The effect on prices and costs was an apparent paradox, as prices continued to rise while production and employment were declining. In past recessions, prices tended to fall during recessionary conditions, but this time they went up, apart from raw materials. The U.S. consumer prices rose 2.7% from 1957 to 1958, and after a pause, they continued to push up until November 1959. Wholesale prices rose 1.6% from 1957 to 1959. The continued upward creep of prices became a cause of concern among many well-known economists analyzing the economy, such as Arthur F. Burns.

== Government response ==
Government efforts to promote a prompt economic recovery played an important role in the moderation of the recession. President Dwight D. Eisenhower, Council of Economic Advisors Chairman Raymond J. Saulnier, Secretary of the Treasury Robert B. Anderson, and Senate Majority Leader Lyndon B. Johnson were some of the important figures playing major roles in this effort. Eisenhower's main focus was to stimulate recovery while keeping the government's financial “house in order”.

Construction projects already underway were accelerated, and those already funded were planned and begun immediately. The United States Department of Agriculture projects for water resource programs and rural electrification were pushed ahead. In order to encourage home building, the administration ended restrictions on no-down payment mortgage loans. Finally, in June 1958, the Congress enacted the legislation to authorize federal assistance to the states so that they could lengthen the period of unemployment benefits. Monetary policy also played a role in dealing with the recession. The Federal Reserve made moves once aware of the severity of the situation, lowering the discount rate to 1.75% until conditions began to improve.

By the end of the recession, the index of industrial production was 142% of the 1947 to 1949 average. Total employment had increased by about 1 million from its recession low while unemployment had been reduced by 1 million. Income and expenditures of individuals were at new high levels. Gross National Product, the broadest measure of the nation's output of goods and services, had risen to an annual rate of $453 billion.

In the United Kingdom, the quick economic recovery under Prime Minister Harold Macmillan allowed the Conservative Party to be reelected for a third term of government against Hugh Gaitskell's Labour Party in the 1959 general election. On the other hand, in the United States the Democratic Party won control of the United States Congress in the 1958 midterm elections in a landslide after the Republican Party was blamed for the economic crisis.
