= Horace Bookwalter Drury =

American economist

- Born: August 21, 1888; Dayton, Ohio, U.S.
- Died: November 8, 1968 (aged 80)

Academic background
- Education: Columbia University
- Doctoral advisor: Henry Rogers Seager

Academic work
- Discipline: Political Economy, and economic organization
- Institutions: Ohio State University, United States Shipping Board, Brookings Institution, National Recovery Administration
- Notable ideas: Scientific Management: A History and Criticism, 1915

Horace Bookwalter Drury (August 21, 1888 - November 8, 1968) was an American economist, lecturer at Ohio State University, and management author, particularly known for his early work on scientific management.

== Biography ==
Drury was born in Dayton, Ohio, in 1888, to Augustus Waldo Drury (1851-1935), a notable theologian and professor, and Sophia (Bookwalter) Drury. He obtained is AB in economics at Otterbein College, and his PhD from Columbia University in 1915 under Henry Rogers Seager.

After his graduation Drury became instructor of economics and sociology at Ohio State University. He came into prominence in the late 1910s after the publication of his PhD dissertation, Scientific Management: A History and Criticism in 1915, translated into German as Wissenschaftliche Betriebsführung : Eine geschichtliche und kritische Würdigung des Taylor-Systems. In 1918 he was lecturer in Industrial Organization at the University of California.

Since 1920, Drury was employed at the Division of Industrial Relations of the United States Shipping Board in Washington, D.C. After the US Shipping Board was abolished in 1934, Drury joined the Brookings Institution, where he was on the staff of the Research and Planning division. In 1934 to 1935 Drury was on the staff of the Division of Review of the National Recovery Administration (NRA) under Leon C. Marshall.

== Work ==
=== Scientific Management: A History and Criticism ===
Drury, in 1915, wrote The History of Management Thought as his PhD dissertation at Columbia under supervision of Henry Rogers Seager, and guided by Robert Thurston Kent, by then editor of Industrial Engineering journal. The dissertation was a survey and analysis of scientific management from a historical and economical point of view.

When Drury published his PhD thesis in 1915 the term "scientific management" had just come into being a few years earlier. The term didn't originate from Frederick Winslow Taylor or one of his associates. In 1911 Taylor had presented his work, system and associated to the general public in a series of four article in The American Magazine. under the title "The Gospel of Efficiency". Drury (1915) explained:

THE significance which has come to be associated with the words scientific management may be traced to an event which occurred in the latter part of 1910. In the early summer of that year, the railroads of the United States north of the Ohio and Potomac rivers and east of the Mississippi had filed with the Interstate Commerce Commission new freight tariffs, so framed as to involve a general and considerable advance in rates. The Interstate Commerce Commission had, on July 13, instituted an inquiry into the reasonableness of the proposed advances, and there had then followed in September, October, and November a series of hearings. The vast sums of money involved, and the fact that the impending decision might become an important precedent, led to a contest of extraordinary intensity on the part of both the railroads and their opponents, the shippers

And furthermore:

It happened that Louis D. Brandeis had assumed the leading position among the fifteen or twenty attorneys lined up against the proposed advances. The railroads, upon whom the law had placed the burden of proof, had maintained that the advances were necessitated by an increase in operating costs, due mainly to a recent rise in wages. Wages, they pleaded, make up nearly one-half of the total cost of railroad operation; and wages had been advanced in the spring of 1910 by from five to eight per cent. Therefore the railroads must receive greater revenue; or they would not have funds enough to make desired improvements, or the credit requisite for the successful flotation of their securities. In the face of these arguments, Mr. Brandeis dramatically took the aggressive, and striking out on a novel and unexpected tack, he declared that there was a means by which the railroads could raise wages, and at the same time instead of increasing costs actually reduce them. This system, which meant high wages and low labor-cost, he called scientific management

The series of Interstate Commerce Commission hearings mentioned attracted national and international press, and with in between 1910 and 1915 the term "scientific management" had come into prominence in the United States. Drury (1915) confirms:

It may be stated that, prior to November, 1910, there was nothing which was generally known by that title. The actual principles of the industrial system which Brandeis had in mind had indeed been in process of formation for about thirty years; but "scientific management, the name, had not yet become an all-embracing slogan ... the combination, "scientific management", had occurred fortuitously in the writings of Frederick W. Taylor ... [but] there were other real names for the system — names more precise and much more common. "Scientific management" had a definite meaning for few persons, if any.

=== October 1910 meeting to determine the name ===
In these 1910 hearings for the Interstate Commerce Commission the foreman of the attorneys of the railroads, Louis D. Brandeis, planned to explain the new management system of Frederick Winslow Taylor and associates to the commission and the general public. Taylor and associated would act as witnesses, and Brandeis wanted to get there story straight. Drury (1915) explained:

As a preliminary step along this line, Mr. Brandeis called together several of his prospective witnesses for the purpose of working out a plan of presentation. He desired that they should reach an agreement whereby the same things should always be called by the same names, and that — most important of all — a single term might be found which would apply to the system as a whole. This word or phrase should properly describe the system, and at the same time appeal to the imagination

About that meeting:

This meeting ... was attended by Louis D. Brandeis, Henry L. Gantt, Frank B. Gilbreth, Henry V. Sheel, and Robert T. Kent. We are told by Mr. Brandeis that among the names suggested were Taylor System, Functional Management, Shop Management, and Efficiency. ... After those present had considered the merits of about half a dozen different phrases, all agreed that, for the purpose of the hearings, the term scientific management should officially designate the system.

=== "The United States might save $1,000,000 a day" ===
The testimonies at the 1910 hearings for the Interstate Commerce Commission had some amazing results. As Drury (1915) explained:

The witnesses were introduced on the afternoon of November 21, and the hearing of their testimony, together with cross-examination, took up almost all of two days and a half. The witnesses testified that in their experience the application of scientific management — whether to the handling of pig iron, the shoveling of coal, bricklaying, or machinery manufacture — had increased the output per workman to at least two or three times its former volume.

And furthermore:

Especially startling was the statement of Harrington Emerson that the railroads of the United States might save $1,000,000 a day by paying greater attention to efficiency of operation. Early in January following Mr. Brandeis submitted a long brief, about half of which was devoted to the subject of scientific management. A few days later his final oral argument on this topic was delivered before the Commission.

This argument about the power of scientific management argument was "felt almost instantaneously by the whole country."

=== Study of industrial prices ===
In the 1930s, Drury conducted economic research with Edwin Griswold Nourse of the Institute of Economics and others. This resulted in the publication of two books America's Capacity to Produce in 1934, and Industrial Price Policies and Economic Progress in 1938. Vernon Arthur Mund (1960) mentioned about this work, that:

in a study of industrial prices, Dr. Edwin G. Nourse and H. B. Drury conclude that in important areas the pricing of our industrial products is no longer accomplished in the process of sale by "the unseen hand." No longer is it true that "the market is the birthplace of prices." Instead, "the office of the industrial executive has now become the center of significant action." Today, an executive "sets a price objective and directs a controlled productive mechanism toward attainment of that price level.

Drury and Nourse (1938) had explained, that:

If goods do not sell at this price, two courses are open. One is to intensify promotional effort. This in essence means stimulating demand, a procedure which itself adds further to costs and works only within the limits set by consumers' purchasing power. The other is to curtail supply. Since labor and raw material account for most of the cost in the majority of finished products, a large part of the expense incurred in carrying on the given industry can be avoided through the power to restrict volume which lies in the hands of the typical modern corporate producer. By holding his frontier of operations back to the point at which unit profits can be assured because no business is accepted which will not pay its own way, corporate management has a considerable power to protect itself.

== Reception ==
A 1924 article in The Personnel Journal acknowledge the early accomplishments of Drury's The History of Management Thought. The article explained:

Horace B. Drury's book when it appeared first, in 1915, was an [sic?] unique document. Up to that time most of the published comment on the Taylor System and its derivatives had been uncritical and deeply partisan. Advocacy of the system was in the hands chiefly of those in position to profit from it, — the management engineers themselves, or industrial leaders such as Henry R. Towne, James M. Dodge, and Brig. Gen. Crozier of the Ordinance Department. Nearly everything written from their angle was oversanguine of the benefits of the movements, — how much so, it is amusing now to recall. Their zeal was appropriate, one must admit, when one considers the attacks they had to meet and the fact that enthusiasm is a virtue in pioneers

In his The History of Management Thought, Claude S. George (1972) gave a critical review of Drury's Scientific Management; a History and Criticism, and compared this work with Robert F. Hoxie's Scientific Management and Labor, also published in 1915. George explained:

Drury was an instructor of economics and sociology at Ohio State University ... [when] he wrote a History and Criticism of Scientific Management.

The first part of his book dealt with the evolution and history of scientific management, while the second half, like Hoxie's, was a critical review of it. He approached his subject in the same manner as Hoxie, criticizing scientific management and its harmful effects on labor. On the whole, however, and in contrast to Hoxie, his criticism was favorable toward scientific management. He believed that there was a large amount of good in the system and that it was still in its formative period. Disagreeing with Hoxie on one major point, Drury though that scientific management represented a shift of managerial thought from machines to men. He saw scientific management as a study of man, of his nature, and of his ideals. He felt that scientific management was based upon the principle that cheerful workmen were more profitable than sullen ones and that the individual was a more satisfactory unity of study and administration than groups. Drury, along with Hoxie, was one of the first to publish criticism of a system that was hailed by many to be of prime value to society. And, interesting to note, both of these criticism came from men in the academic rather than in the business sector.

Recently, in 2016, Morgen Witzel also acknowledged, that Horace B. Drury thesis is among the seminal works on scientific management. He stated:

There is a considerable literature on the scientific management movement, beginning with contemporary works such as C. Bertrand Thompson, Scientific Management, 1914, Horace B. Drury, Scientific Management, 1915, and Hoxie, Scientific Management and Labor, 1915. H.G.T. Cannons, Bibliography of Industrial Efficiency and Factory Management, 1920, lists a large number of related publications. Among later works, Urwick and Brech's three-volume work The Making of Scientific Management, 1947, is a detailed account of the multinational development of scientific management.

== Selected publications ==
- Drury, Horace Bookwalter (1915). Scientific Management – A History and Criticism (PhD thesis). Columbia University. LCCN 15015230. OCLC 2008454.
  - 1st ed. – via Internet Archive
  - 1st ed. – via Google Books
  - 1st ed. – via HathiTrust
  - 1st ed. – via HathiTrust
- Drury, Horace Bookwalter (1915). "Scientific Management – A History and Criticism". Studies in History, Economics and Public Law. 65 (2): 275–496. ISSN 0044-2550.
  - 1st ed. – via HathiTrust
  - 2nd ed., revised – via Google Books
  - 2nd ed., revised – via Google Books
  - 2nd ed., revised – via Internet Archive
  - 3rd ed., revised & enlarged – via Internet Archive
  - Re-print of 3rd ed., revised & enlarged. 1st AMS ed. via – Google Books
- Nourse, Edwin Griswold; Frederick Gale Tryon; Frederick Bookwalter Drury; Maurice Leven; Harold Glenn Moulton; Cleona Lewis; et al. (1934). "America's Capacity to Produce". The Distribution of Income in Relation to Economic Progress. Brookings Institution – via Internet Archive.
  - LCCN 34-20234, LCCN 39-15233, LCCN 37-12115, LCCN 79-27946
  - 1935 re-print: Pittsburgh: The Eddy Press Corporation; OCLC 28907896 (all editions)
  - 1980 re-print; Greenwood Press), LCCN 35-9440
- Nourse, Edwin Griswold; Drury, Horace Bookwalter (1938). Industrial Price Policies and Economic Progress. Institute of economics of the Brookings institution ;Publication no.76. Brookings Institution. LCCN 38018513. OCLC 270824 – via HathiTrust.
Articles, a selection
- Drury, Horace Bookwalter. The Annals. American Academy of Political and Social Science. ISSN 0002-7162, ISSN 1552-3349; OCLC 1479265 (all editions).
  - —— (May 1916). "Democracy as a Factor in Industrial Efficiency". The Annals of the American Academy of Political and Social Science. 65: 15–27. doi:10.1177/000271621606500104. JSTOR 1013556. OCLC 5546428335 – via Internet Archive..
  - —— (January 1924). "Wages in the Coal Industry as Compared With Wages in Other Industries With Special Reference to the Anthracite Situation". The Annals of the American Academy of Political and Social Science. 111: 314–343. doi:10.1177/000271622411100135 – via Google Books..
  - —— (July 1930). "World Peace and the Rivalry of Merchant Marines". The Annals of the American Academy of Political and Social Science. 150: 33–39. doi:10.1177/000271623015000106 – via Internet Archive..
- —— (January 1917). "Scientific Management and Progress". Congress of Engineering, October 26–28, 1916: Bulletin No. 16.; College of Engineering. Vol. 21, no. 12. The Ohio State University. pp. 134–153 – via Google Books.
- —— (November 1916). "Scientific Management and Progress". Bulletin of the Taylor Society. Vol. 2, no. 4. pp. 1–10 – via Google Books.
- —— (March 1936). Production and Capacity Control in the Ice Industry (Report). Vol. Work Materials No. 64. Office of the National Recovery Administration, Division of Review, Trade Practices Studies Section. LCCN unk82091176. OCLC 180193333. 9827 – via Internet Archive.
- —— (May 1, 1935). "Administration and Effects of Production and Capacity Control Provisions in NRA Codes". Special Research and Planning Reports and Memoranda. NRA Division of Research and Planning. pp. 118, 120–122.
  - Access guides:
    - "Guide to Federal Records: Records of the National Recovery Administration (Record Group 9). 1927–37. Overview of Records Locations". National Archives and Records Administration.
    - "National Archives at Atlanta: Record Groups 4–49". National Archives and Records Administration. 15 August 2016.
    - "Records of the National Recovery Administration (Record Group 9)". Guide to the National Archives of the United States. National Archives and Records Service. 1974. p. 627. ISBN 9780911333237 – via Google Books.
    - Calkin, Homer Leonard; Fishbein, Meyer Harry, eds. (1954). "Production". Special List of Documents in the Records of the National Recovery Administration. National Archives and Records Service. Special list No. 12.

== Bibliography ==
=== References ===
- Clara Elizabeth Fanning; Margaret Jackson, eds. (February 1916). "Drury, Horace Bookwalter; Scientific Management". Book Review Digest. Vol. XI, no. 12. p. 134 – via Google Books.
- "(n.a.)". Boston Evening Transcript. Vol. 87, no. 1. January 1, 1916. p. 10. OCLC 227519958.
- Fisher, Boyd (June 1924). "Book Reviews: Scientific Management; by Horace Bookwalter Drury. New York: Longmans, Green and Company, 1922". Journal of Personnel Research. 3 (2): 63–64. ISSN 0886-750X. LCCN sf85001101. OCLC 1605910 – via HathiTrust.
- George, Claude Swanson Jr (1972). The History of Management Thought. Prentice-Hall, Inc. p. 124. ISBN 978-0-1339-0187-0. LCCN 70038415. OCLC 363432 – via Internet Archive.
- March, James G.; Simon, Herbert Alexander (1963) [1958]. Organizations. John Wiley and Sons. ISBN 978-0-4715-6793-6. LCCN 58013464. OCLC 1329335 – via Internet Archive.
- "Marshall, Leon C.". Presidential Executive Orders Numbered 1–8030, 1862–1938. Vol. 2: Index. Books, Inc. 1944. p. 327 – via HathiTrust.
- McCartin, Joseph A. (1997). Labor's Great War: The Struggle for Industrial Democracy and the Origins of Modern American Labor Relations, 1912–1921. University of North Carolina Press. p. 52. ISBN 978-0-8078-2372-9. LCCN 97009364. OCLC 36573696 – via Google Books.
- "Correspondence: United States Shipping Board". Journal of Proceedings of the National Marine Engineers' Beneficial Association: Minutes of the 45th Annual Convention, January 19–24, 1920. Vol. 16. National Marine Engineers' Beneficial Association of the United States. 1920. p. 993 – via HathiTrust.
- Mund, Herbert Arthur (1949). "Prevalence of Monopoly Power". Government and Business (3rd ed.). Harper. p. 522. LCCN 50003947. OCLC 1027935 – via Internet Archive.
- Nelson, Daniel Melvin (1980). Frederick W. Taylor and the Rise of Scientific Management. University of Wisconsin Press. ISBN 978-0-2990-8160-7. LCCN 79005411. OCLC 6087867 – via Google Books.
- "National Recovery Administration (NRA) and the New Deal: A Resource Guide: NRA Work Materials". Library of Congress.
- Sinclair, Upton; Taylor, Frederick Winslow (June 1911). "The Gospel of Efficiency: The Principles of Scientific Management: A criticism". The American Magazine. Vol. 72, no. 2. pp. 243–245 – via Google Books.
- "Drury, Horace Bookwalter". Who's who in the Nation's Capital. Who's Who in the Nation's Capital 1921–1922. Consolidated Pub. Co. 1921. p. 114. LCCN 21014804. OCLC 04660484 – via Google Books.
  - Williamson, Stanley H., ed. (1926). "Drury, Horace Bookwalter". Who's who in the nation's capital. Who's Who in the Nation's Capital 1926–1927. Ransdell Incorporated. p. 189 – via HathiTrust.
- Witzel, Morgen (2016) [2012]. A History of Management Thought (2nd ed.). Rougledge. p. 239 (footnote 3). ISBN 978-1-1389-1162-8. LCCN 2016027655. OCLC 957455124 – via Google Books.
