= Edith Rogers =

Edith Rogers may refer to:

- Edith Rogers (Alberta politician), Canadian member of the Legislative Assembly of Alberta, 1935–1940
- Edith Rogers (Manitoba politician), Canadian member of the Legislative Assembly of Manitoba, 1920–1932
- Edith Nourse Rogers (1881–1960), American politician

== See also ==
- Edie Rodgers (born 1934), member of the South Carolina Senate
