= Nancy Teeters =

U.S. economist, central banker, and corporate executive (1930–2014)

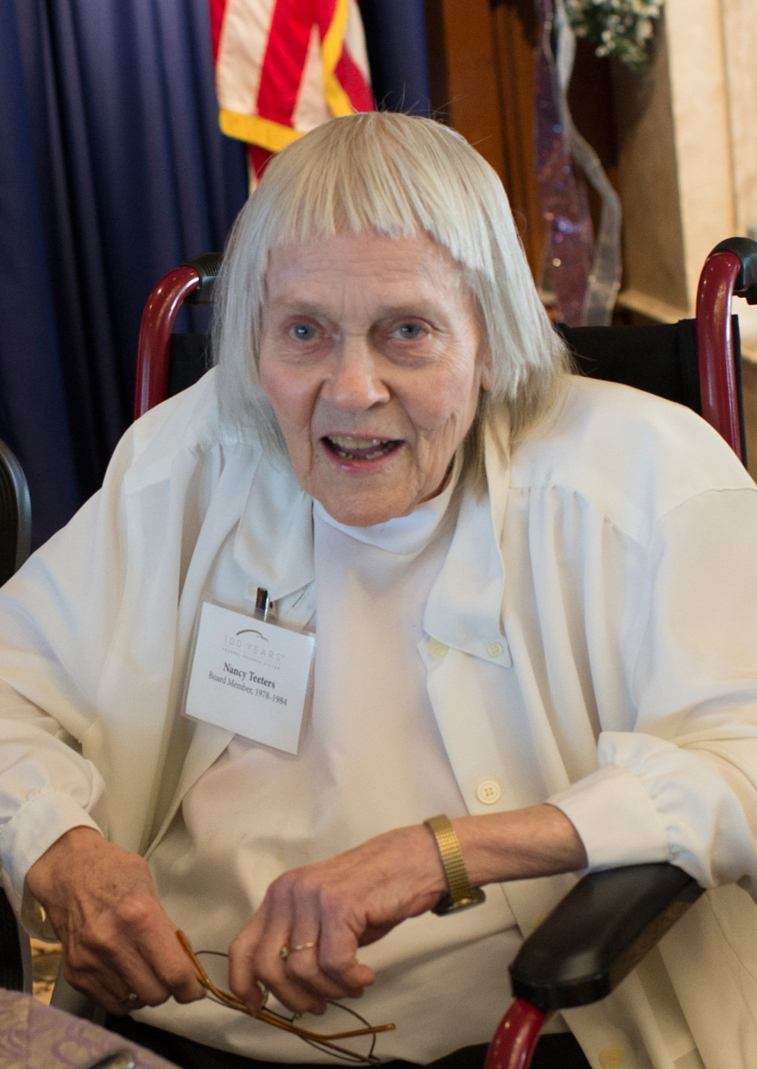

Member of the Federal Reserve Board of Governors
- In office September 18, 1978 – June 27, 1984
- President: Jimmy Carter; Ronald Reagan
- Preceded by: Arthur F. Burns
- Succeeded by: Martha Seger

Personal details
- Born: July 29, 1930 Marion, Indiana, U.S.
- Died: November 17, 2014 (aged 84) Stamford, Connecticut, U.S.
- Party: Democratic
- Spouse: Robert Teeters
- Education: Oberlin College (BA); University of Michigan, Ann Arbor (MA)

Nancy Hays Teeters (July 29, 1930 – November 17, 2014) was an American economist and corporate executive who served as a member of the Federal Reserve Board of Governors from 1978 to 1984. A member of the Democratic Party, Teeters was the first woman to sit on the Board. She was nominated by President Jimmy Carter to fill out the remainder of the term of Arthur F. Burns, a former chairman of the Fed. Teeters was known for her public statements in which she dissented from the mainstream opinion of the Board and Chairman Paul Volcker.

== Early life and education ==
Teeters was the youngest of three children born to Edgar Hayes, a box salesman, and Mabel, a homemaker. She received a bachelor's degree from Oberlin College in 1952 and a master's degree from the University of Michigan in 1954, both in economics.

== Career ==
In 1957, Teeters joined the Federal Reserve as a staff economist in the Division of Research and Statistics. From 1962 to 1963, she worked as an economist on the staff of the Council of Economic Advisers, then led by Chair Walter Heller. She returned to the Fed for three years and also spent time with the Bureau of the Budget (predecessor of the Office of Management and Budget, the Brookings Institution, and the Congressional Research Service prior to her appointment to the Board of Governors of the Federal Reserve.

After leaving the Fed, she joined IBM as director of economics, and was elected an IBM vice president and chief economist in 1986; the second woman to hold the post. Teeters served in that capacity until her retirement in 1990. She died on November 17, 2014, at the age of 84.

Government offices
| Preceded by Arthur F. Burns | Member of the Federal Reserve Board of Governors; 1978–1984 | Succeeded by Martha Seger |
