= Edwin Griswold Nourse =

American economist

Edwin Nourse
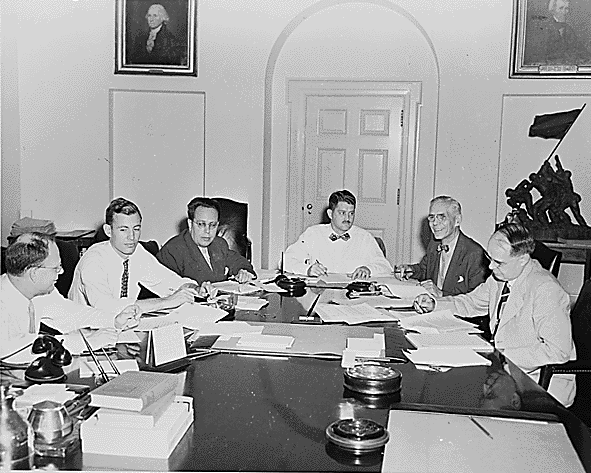
- Nourse (second from right) at the White House in July 1949

1st Chair of the Council of Economic Advisers
- In office August 9, 1946 – November 1, 1949
- President: Harry S. Truman
- Preceded by: Position established
- Succeeded by: Leon Keyserling

Personal details
- Born: Edwin Griswold Nourse; May 20, 1883 Lockport, New York, U.S.
- Died: April 7, 1974 (aged 90) Bethesda, Maryland, U.S.
- Party: Democratic
- Education: Illinois Institute of Technology (attended); Cornell University (BA); University of Chicago (MA, PhD)

Edwin Griswold Nourse (May 20, 1883 – April 7, 1974) was an American economist who served as the first chairman of the Council of Economic Advisers from 1946 to 1949.

== Early life and education ==
Nourse was born in Lockport, New York, Nourse moved to a western suburb of Chicago at the age of four months, and considered himself a Midwesterner. His father worked in the city as a supervisor of public school music. His sister, Alice Tisdale Hobart, went on to become a bestselling novelist. In high school Nourse enjoyed English and history, and after spending a year at the Louis Institute, went on to Cornell University with an interest in civil engineering. In 1903, he was caught in a wave of typhoid fever that hit campus; upon his return he decided to simply get his A.B., but also took several classes at the College of Agriculture.

== Career ==
Following college, Nourse taught for two years in high school, spent a year on graduate studies, and then taught at the Wharton School, where he conceived of agricultural economics. From there he transited through the University of South Dakota, the University of Arkansas, Iowa State College, and on to the University of Chicago, where he received his Ph.D. in 1915 for the dissertation "The Chicago Produce Market: A Study of Market Mechanism as a Factor in Price Determination". He continued to study and write about agricultural cooperation:

It is ridiculous to assert that agriculture is too tough a nut for the corporation to crack in this day of consolidation of railroads, factories, bakeries, milk distribution, cleaning and pressing, and even beauty parlors.

Nourse was a friend of Harold Moulton, the first president of the Brookings Institution, and in 1923 he convinced Nourse to come work on the agriculture side of the Institute of Economics. He remained there until 1946, moving from the head of the agriculture division to director of Institute of Economics in 1929 and then vice president in 1942.

Two years later in July he met President Harry S. Truman for the first time by way of Charles Griffith Ross to speak about becoming member of the newly created Council of Economic Advisors; Nourse subsequently resigned from Brookings to become its first chairman, with Leon Keyserling as his vice-chairman and John D. Clark as a member.

Nourse was an elected member of the American Academy of Arts and Sciences and the American Philosophical Society.

== Selected publications ==
- Nourse, E. G., Tryon, F. G., Drury, H. B., Leven, M., Moulton, H. G., & Lewis, C. America's capacity to produce. 1934.
- Nourse, Edwin Griswold, and Horace Bookwalter Drury. Industrial price policies and economic progress. 1938.

Political offices
New office	Chair of the Council of Economic Advisers; 1946–1949	Succeeded by Leon Keyserling
