= Elizabeth Ashburn Duke =

American Federal Reserve Governor

Betsy Duke
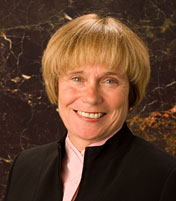

Member of the Federal Reserve Board of Governors
- In office August 5, 2008 – August 31, 2013
- President: George W. Bush; Barack Obama
- Preceded by: Susan Bies
- Succeeded by: Lael Brainard

Personal details
- Born: Elizabeth Ashburn Duke; July 23, 1952 (age 74) Portsmouth, Virginia, U.S.
- Party: Independent
- Education: North Carolina State University; University of North Carolina, Chapel Hill (BFA); Old Dominion University (MBA)

Betsy Duke (born Elizabeth Ashburn Duke; July 23, 1952) is an American bank executive who served as a member of the Federal Reserve Board of Governors from 2008 to 2013. Duke was confirmed by the Senate to fill an unexpired term ending January 31, 2012. She was the seventh woman to be appointed to the board. In July 2013, she announced her resignation from the board.

On January 1, 2018, she became the Chair of the Board of Directors of Wells Fargo, having served as Vice-Chair from October 12, 2016.

== Early life and education ==
Elizabeth Ashburn Duke was born in Portsmouth, Virginia, and grew up in Virginia Beach, Virginia. She first studied physics at North Carolina State University before transferring to the University of North Carolina at Chapel Hill, where she graduated with a bachelor of fine arts in drama in 1974. She later graduated with an M.B.A. from Old Dominion University. After graduating, she worked as a part-time teller at First and Merchants National Bank in Virginia Beach because she "needed a job."

== Professional career ==
In 1977, Duke became the vice president and chief financial officer of the Bank of Virginia Beach. While working full-time, she attended Old Dominion University part-time and received her MBA in 1983. She transferred to the Bank of Tidewater in 1985 as vice president and chief financial officer. She became its president in 1987 and chief executive officer in 1991. She was selected as a director of the Federal Reserve Bank of Richmond in 1998. In 1999, she was elected president of the Virginia Bankers Association.

Duke remained as president and CEO of Bank of Tidewater until it was acquired by SouthTrust in 2001. SouthTrust made her executive vice president of community bank development. When Wachovia acquired SouthTrust in 2004, Duke remained an executive VP, but in charge of the merger project office.

She was elected chairman of the American Bankers Association for the 2004-05 year. In 2005, she became senior executive vice president and chief operating officer of TowneBank. She was nominated to the Board of Governors of the Federal Reserve by President George W. Bush on May 15, 2007. On July 11, 2013, Duke announced her resignation from the Board of Governors of the Federal Reserve effective August 31, 2013.

Duke was elected Vice Chair of Wells Fargo's Board of Directors in October 2016. On August 15, 2017, Duke was elected to succeed Wells Fargo current chairman, Stephen Sanger, on January 1, 2018, making the former Federal Reserve governor the first woman to hold the top board role at one of the nation's largest banks.

=== Wells Fargo's scandal and resignation ===
Duke, then the chairwoman of Wells Fargo's board, resigned on Sunday March 8, 2020, under pressure from lawmakers and following a critical House Financial Services Committee report. James H. Quigley, another director, also stepped down. The report accused both of complacency in addressing the bank's deceptive sales practices, which included opening fake accounts and charging unnecessary fees. These practices resulted in billions in fines and ongoing federal restrictions. This later became known as the Wells Fargo cross-selling scandal.

The report highlighted Duke's reluctance to engage with regulators and Quigley's involvement in seeking leniency from the Consumer Financial Protection Bureau. The resignations, prompted by criticism from lawmakers like Representative Maxine Waters, wereseen as steps toward reforming the bank's troubled culture.

Wells Fargo, embroiled in scandals since 2016, has faced leadership turnover, regulatory scrutiny, and substantial fines, including a $3 billion settlement in February 2020.

== Honors and activities ==
- Member of the executive advisory council, Old Dominion University Business School.
- Member of Virginia Council on Economic Education 2005-2006 Board of Directors
- Commended as an exceptional role model for women in the banking industry by the Virginia General Assembly in 2005.
- Honored as one of eight women in the Library of Virginia's 2014 "Virginia Women in History"

Government offices
Preceded by Susan Bies	Member of the Federal Reserve Board of Governors; 2008–2013	Succeeded by Lael Brainard
