= Catherine Ceips =

American politician

Catherine C. Ceips

Member of the South Carolina Senate from the 46th district
- In office 2007–2009
- Preceded by: Scott Richardson
- Succeeded by: Tom Davis

Member of the South Carolina House of Representatives from the 124th district
- In office 2003–2007
- Preceded by: Edie Rodgers
- Succeeded by: Shannon Erickson

Personal details
- Born: February 16, 1955 (age 71) Berkeley County, South Carolina
- Party: Republican
- Spouse: Wallace B. Scarborough
- Profession: small business owner

Catherine C. Ceips (born February 16, 1955) is a former Republican member of the South Carolina Senate, representing the 46th District from the time of a special election in 2007 until the end of the term January 14, 2009. Previously she was a member of the South Carolina House of Representatives from 2003 through 2006.

== Early life and education ==
She was born in Berkeley County, South Carolina and graduated from the University of South Carolina with a B.S. in 1976. She married Richard N. Ceips on May 17, 1986. Dr. Ceips died in 2006. She began dating Wallace Scarborough in 2008. In December 2009 she married former South Carolina lawmaker Wallace Scarborough. She is a Lutheran.

== Career ==
Her work history includes Fed. Rep. Field Dir., Congressman Joe Wilson; Fed. Rep. Field Dir., Congressman Floyd Spence; Comm. Serv. Dir., Med. Univ. of S.C.; Teacher, Beaufort and Berkeley Co. Schools; business owner.

She previously served in House 2003-06; elected in Special Election June 19, 2007, to fulfill the unexpired term of Republican Scott Richardson, who had resigned. She was defeated 56% to 44% in the June 10, 2008, primary election for the District 46 seat by Tom Davis, who went on to win the general election over Democrat Kent Fletcher.

Ceips stated that the encouragement to run for Republican Edie Rodgers' seat came from people she had helped through the congressional office.

== Memberships ==
She is a member of the Sea Island Ophthalmology; Beaufort County Republican Women's Club; Beaufort County GOP; Beaufort Historic Foundation; and the Open Land Trust. She supported Beaufort Little Theatre and other theatre groups.
