= Harriet Keyserling =

American politician

Member of the South Carolina House of Representatives from the 124th district
- In office 1977–1991
- Succeeded by: Billy Keyserling

Personal details
- Born: April 4, 1922 New York
- Died: December 10, 2010 (aged 88) Beaufort, South Carolina
- Party: Democratic
- Relations: Leon Keyserling Mary Dublin Keyserling
- Children: Four, including Billy Keyserling
- Education: Barnard College

Harriet Hirschfield Keyserling (born April 4, 1922 - December 10, 2010) was an American politician. She was a former member of the South Carolina House of Representatives from the 124th District, and was a member of the Democratic party.

== Early life and education ==
Keyserling was born in New York. She graduated from Barnard College in 1943.

== Political career ==
=== South Carolina House of Representatives ===
Keyserling served in the South Carolina House of Representatives from 1977 until 1991, succeeded by her son Billy Keyserling.

Keyserling's main contributions were advocating for state funding for the arts and a focus on nuclear waste and energy issues.

=== Beaufort County Council ===
Keyserling served as an At-Large member of Beaufort County Council from 1975 to 1977. She was the first woman elected to the council.

== Written works ==
Keyserling, Harriet. Against the Tide: One Woman's Political Struggle. University of South Carolina Press, 2004. Foreword by Dick Riley.

== Honors and recognitions ==
- The S.C. Arts Commission Elizabeth Verner O'Neill Award
- Order of the Palmetto
- Greenville News Legislator of the Year
- Honored by the American Civil Liberties Union, the SC Nature Conservancy, SC libraries, and the SC Women's Commission.

== Legacy ==
- Harriet Keyserling Conservation Advocacy Award, Conservation Voters of South Carolina, honoring her work on conservation issues at the State House. Keyserling was the first recipient in 2009.
- Harriet and Herbert Keyserling Fund with the Coastal Community Foundation.
- Harriet Keyserling Service Award, Beaufort County Democratic Party

== Personal life ==
Keyserling married Benjamin Herbert Keyserling in 1944, and had four children: Judith (d. 2012), William 'Billy', Paul and Beth.

Keyserling died in 2010 from renal failure after a medical procedure. Speakers at her celebration of life in 2011 included scholar Martin Perlmutter, author Pat Conroy, Charles 'Bud' Ferillo and Clinton administration appointee and South Carolina Governor Dick Riley.
