= Susan Bies =

American politician

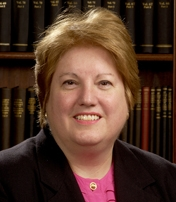

Member of the Federal Reserve Board of Governors
- In office December 7, 2001 – March 30, 2007
- President: George W. Bush
- Preceded by: Susan M. Phillips
- Succeeded by: Elizabeth Ashburn Duke

Personal details
- Born: May 5, 1947 (age 78) Buffalo, New York, U.S.
- Education: Buffalo State College (BA); Northwestern University (MA, PhD)

Susan Schmidt Bies (born May 5, 1947) is an American economist and corporate executive who served as a member of the Federal Reserve Board of Governors from 2001 to 2007.

Bies was born in Buffalo, New York, and received a B.S. in education from Buffalo State College in 1967 and an M.A. (1968) and a Ph.D. (1972), both in economics, from Northwestern University.

== Federal Reserve ==
Bies took office on December 7, 2001, as a full term member of the board of governors of the Federal Reserve System, term to end January 31, 2012. She submitted her resignation from the board on February 9, 2007, and left the Fed effective March 30, 2007. A Federal Reserve Press Notice stated she planned to spend more time with her family.

== Prior professional career ==
Before becoming a member of the board, Bies was executive vice president for risk management and auditor at First Tennessee National Corporation (now listed as First Horizon National Corporation) in Memphis, Tennessee (1995–2001). From 1979 to 1995, she served in various other positions at First Tennessee, including executive vice president and chief financial officer, senior vice president and chief financial officer, senior vice president and treasurer, vice president for corporate development, tactical planning manager, and economist.

Before joining First Tennessee, Bies was associate professor of economics, Rhodes College, Memphis, Tennessee (1977–79); assistant professor of economics, Wayne State University, Detroit, Michigan (1972–77); and chief regional and banking structure economist at the Federal Reserve Bank of St. Louis (1970–72).

Bies has served as a fellow at the Federal Reserve Bank of Chicago (1969–70) and as a fellow at the Northwestern University Center for Urban Affairs (1968–69).

Bies has been active in leadership positions for various organizations, including the Emerging Issues Task Force of the Financial Accounting Standards Board, the Committee on Corporate Reporting of the Financial Executives Institute, the End Users of Derivatives Association, the American Bankers Association, and the Bank Administration Institute. She has also served with numerous other business, professional, academic, civic, and charitable organizations including the American Economic Association, Institute of Management Accountants, International Women's Forum, Economic Association of Memphis, University of Memphis, Memphis Area Chamber of Commerce, Memphis Youth Initiative, and Memphis Partners.

== Comment on subprime mortgage crisis ==
In December 2008, Bies said she thought that regulators had been caught by surprise by the rapid growth in volume of so-called subprime and adjustable-rate mortgages in the mid-2000s subprime mortgage crisis, and that she regretted there was not quicker action taken to protect borrowers. "When you get into people whose mortgage payments are taking half of their cash flow, they are in over their heads, and these loans should not have been sold to this customer base," she said, quoted in The New York Times. "This makes me sick when I see this happening."

== Joins Bank of America board ==
In June 2009, as part of a government-encouraged restructuring of the board after the 2008 financial crisis, Bies was named to the board of directors of Bank of America.

== Personal life ==
As of 2007, Bies is married and has two adult sons.

Government offices
Preceded by Susan M. Phillips	Member of the Federal Reserve Board of Governors; 2001–2007	Succeeded by Elizabeth Ashburn Duke
