= Mary Dublin Keyserling =

American economist

Personal details
- Born: May 25, 1911 New York City, New York, U.S.
- Died: June 11, 1997 (aged 86) Washington, D.C., U.S.
- Spouse: Leon Keyserling
- Relations: Harriet Keyserling, sister-in-law; Billy Keyserling, nephew
- Education: Barnard College

Mary Dublin Keyserling (1911–1997) was a liberal economist and federal employee noted for her sometimes contrarian views on issues faced by working women. Her time as an economist is largely linked to her time as a federal employee by her career and positions in the United States government. During her career as head of the United States Women's Bureau, Keyserling and her husband Leon Keyserling faced loyalty allegations during the Red Scare that impacted their governmental careers.

== Early years ==
Mary Dublin Keyserling was born in New York City, New York on May 25, 1911, to a Jewish family. Both of her parents, Augusta Salik, her mother, and Louis I. Dublin, her father, were immigrants to the United States. Mary Dublin Keyserling was influenced by various social reforms that took place in the United States since young age due to her parents' positive interactions and open minds with many of these social reforms, such as women gaining more rights, that took place during the United States Progressive Era.

== Career ==
=== Economist ===
Mary Dublin Keyserling was a Keynesian economist. She first went to school at Barnard College to study economics and graduated in 1930 as president of her senior class. She then pursued graduate studies at the Graduate Institute of International and Development Studies in Geneva, the London School of Economics, and ultimately at Columbia University to gain a doctoral degree that she did not finish. While in college, Mary Dublin Keyserling was taught by economist Wesley Clair Mitchell. During a fellowship while still at Barnard, Keyserling, studied with Economist John Maynard Keynes. It was at Columbia University did she meet and marry Leon Keyserling, then an economics instructor, in 1940. She worked for the United States government as an economist under the presidential administrations of Franklin D. Roosevelt, Harry Truman, and Lyndon B. Johnson.

=== Government employee ===
Keyserling began to work for the United States' Government in 1930 after graduating from college. Her first government job was as a researcher in the Committee on the Costs of Medical Care. Within a year, Keyserling worked in the State Charities Aid Association of New York City as an administrator. Between 1940 and 1953 Keyserling served on various positions in the American Government.

- 1940–194, Consumers Division
- 1941–1942 in the House Committee on National Defense Migration
- 1942–1943, Chief of the Office of Civilian Defense's Research and Statistics Division
- 1943–1945, Director of the Foreign Economic Administration's Liberated Areas Division
- 1946–1953, Director of the Department of Commerce's International Economic Analysis Division, Office of International Trade.
- 1964–1968, Director of the Women's Bureau.

In 1953, following her loyalty trial, Keyserling retired from her governmental position in the Commerce Department. She later returned to working for the government at a later date, as shown in her accepting the position of head of the Women's Bureau in 1964. Keyserling was the head of the Women's Bureau from 1964 to 1968. However, she was an associate director on the Council on Economic Progress before selected by President Johnson to be the head of the Women's Bureau in 1964. While in office she used the emphasis on improving the purchasing power of workers from the War on Poverty to justify legislation concerning a minimum wage and maximum hours for workers.

== Red Scare ==
Keyserling was one of the many women working in the United States government that was challenged over her loyalty from 1930s to 1950s. In 1952 and 1953, Keyserling was put on a loyalty trial due to possible Communist leanings. It has been speculated that she was accused due to her husband Leon Keyserling. Another factor was that as a Keynesian economist her ideals went against one of the Red Scare's goals, the goal of rolling back the gains of the New Deal. The accusation that started the trail was made on February 9, 1952, by Joseph McCarthy. McCarthy stated that Keyserlying was a former member of ten Communist groups. Two months later, McCarthy stated that Keyserling had joined the communist party. It was later alleged the Keyserling perjured herself when denying being a part of communist activities. Prior to McCarthy stating she was a communist in 1952, Keyserling swore under oath that she was not a communist before the Dies Committee in 1942. When Keyserling swore that oath she was found to not have any evidence of being a communist. Also, previously in 1948 Keyserling faced loyalty hearings concerning Communist ties and activities. The majority of, these activities were connected to her brother in law George Marshall. Due to these allegations, Keyserling had to take a leave of absence from her job in the United States' Commerce Department until being found innocent of being a communist. In 1952, Keyserling was found to be guilty by the Commerce Department loyalty board. This decision was later overturned in 1953 on January 5. The information that led to her being found guilty was gained under the 1939 Hatch Act, which allowed for the FBI to collect information about Keyserling when she became a federal employee in 1940. Keyserling, when she was younger, was a part of circles the included communists. However, she did not interact with these groups while she worked for the government.

== Women's advocacy ==
Keyserling was a key figure in the moderate or conservative portion of the feminist movement. Throughout her lifetime she was the president of the Women's National Democratic Club, a part of the Committee for Protective Labor Legislation of the President's Commission on the Status of Women, and the head of the Women's Bureau. Starting in the early 1930s, Keyserling was a part of a network of female experts and activists who tried to resolve social inequalities in gender, class, and race. Keyserling believed sex discrimination to be more serious than race discrimination. She advocated for women and their rights while heading the Women's Bureau. During her time as the Director of the Women's Bureau of the U.S. Department of Labor, she served as an invited speaker at the 1966 Biennial Convention of the National Association of Colored Women's Clubs.

While head of the Women's Bureau she fought for women to be included in the War on Poverty Program. The War on Poverty Program was being created to help combat poverty in the United States by giving those eligible job training and further work opportunities backed by the United States Government. Many of these work opportunities were jobs paid for by the American Government. Before intervening in the War on Poverty Program, women were excluded from the program. Keyserling was of the opinion, that women being excluded from the workplace had a negative impact on the economy. Women would not have been eligible under the original wording of the document outlining the War on Poverty Program to have been a part of the program. While head of the Women's Bureau, Keyserling's actions led to the War Poverty Program including women. Being included in the War on Poverty Program gave women the same benefits as men concerning jobs and job training men gained from the program. She also worked with already formed Business and Professional Women's Clubs while head of the Women's Bureau to create and implement other such clubs in every state. By 1967 all fifty states had a Business and Professional Women's Club. Keyserling oftentimes had to go to individual states to help the programs to be implemented. State governors, such as in Texas, were educated on women's clubs, leading to organizations getting recognized in their state. Keyserling became an honorary member of Zeta Phi Beta sorority in 1970. In the last few decades of her life, she was a part of Radcliffe's Women in the Federal Government Oral History Project. After becoming a feminist in the 1930s, Keyserling remained one until her death on June 11, 1997.
