= Martha Seger =

U.S. economist, central banker, and corporate executive (1932–2021)

Member of the Federal Reserve Board of Governors
- In office July 2, 1984 – March 3, 1991
- President: Ronald Reagan
- Preceded by: Nancy Teeters
- Succeeded by: Susan M. Phillips

Personal details
- Born: February 17, 1932 Adrian, Michigan
- Died: June 30, 2021 (aged 89)
- Education: University of Michigan; Bachelor's degree MBA; PhD

Martha Romayne Seger (February 17, 1932 – June 30, 2021) was an American economist, business administrator, and member of the Federal Reserve Board of Governors. In 1976, she was named by Businessweek Magazine as one the top corporate women in the United States. She was the first woman to start at the beginning of the term for the Federal Reserve governor position and complete the term, with having served from 1984 to 1991.

== Early life ==
Martha Seger was born in Adrian, Michigan in 1932. She earned a bachelor's degree, master's degree in business administration and a doctorate in finance and business economics from the University of Michigan. She was a member of both the international collegiate honor society Phi Kappa Phi and the international business society Beta Gamma Sigma.

== Career ==
From 1964 to 1967, Seger was a financial economist for the Federal Reserve Board of Governors in Washington, D.C.. In 1967, she was chief economist at Detroit Bank and Trust. In 1974, she became vice president for economics and investments at the Bank of the Commonwealth based in Detroit, which had been struggling financially as a financial institution starting two years earlier. She helped the company become financially healthier. The Bank of the Commonwealth merged with Comerica in 1984.

In 1980, Seger was an associate professor of economics and finance at Oakland University and was appointed to the position of Michigan's commissioner of financial institutions by Governor William Milliken. She had served in that position from 1981 to 1982. She later became a professor at Central Michigan University. While she was a distinguished visiting Professor of Finance at Central Michigan University, President Reagan had announced on May 31, 1984 her nomination to the Board of Governors of the Federal Reserve System.

Seger served as Federal Reserve governor from July 2, 1984, to March 3, 1991. While on the Board, Seger chaired its Consumer and Community Affairs Committee. She also represented the Board on the National Women's Business Council and chaired the Neighborhood Reinvestment Corporation. She started during the time of the presidency of Ronald Reagan. Prior to Seger being appointed, Reagan said about a proposed significant tax cut where the tax rate would lower from 70% to 50% for those in the highest tax brackets, "We presented a complete program of reduction in tax rates. Again, our purpose was to provide incentive for the individual, incentives for business to encourage production and hiring of the unemployed, and to free up money for investment." In 1985, Seger said, "As long as I can remember I've believed in incentives. When you have a minority interest in your paycheck, I just can't believe you put forth the same effort as you would if you had, say, at least a 60 percent claim on it."

After serving at the Federal Reserve, Seger was a John M. Olin Distinguished Fellow in the Eller Center for the Study of the Private Market Economy at the University of Arizona from 1991 to 1993. From 1994 to 2001, she was the principal and an economic consultant at the financial and economic consulting firm of M.R. Seger & Associates. Seger held director positions at Commonwealth General Corporation (formerly known as Providian Corporation), Comerica and Comerica Bank-Detroit, The Bramwell Funds, The Amerisure Companies, Xerox Corporation, Kroger Company, Johnson Controls Incorporated, Amoco Corporation, Massey Energy Company, Fluor Corporation, BP plc and Tucson Electric Power Company.

Seger was on the Board of Scholars of the Mackinac Center for Public Policy, as well as was a board member of the National Chamber Foundation and the Institute for Research on the Economies of Taxation.
