= Billy Keyserling =

American politician

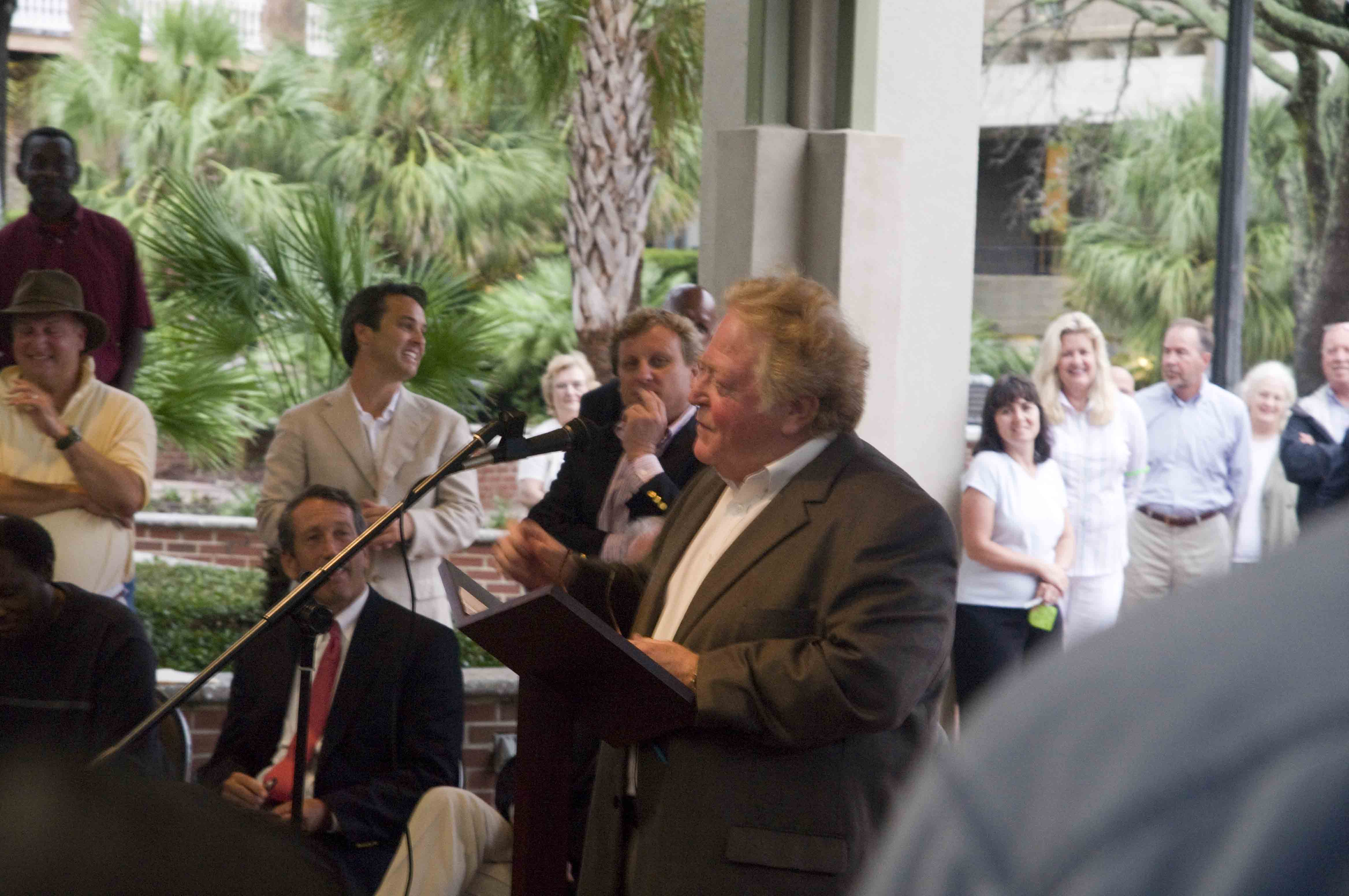
- Keyserling, with Mark Sanford (seated) at ceremony awarding Joe Frazier the Order of the Palmetto, 2010

Member of the South Carolina House of Representatives from the 124th district
- In office 1991–1995
- Preceded by: Harriet Keyserling
- Succeeded by: Edie Rodgers

Personal details
- Born: June 29, 1948 (age 78) Beaufort, South Carolina, U.S.
- Party: Democratic
- Relations: Leon Keyserling Mary Dublin Keyserling
- Parent: Harriet Keyserling

William D. 'Billy' Keyserling (born June 29, 1948) is an American politician. He is a former member of the South Carolina House of Representatives from the 124th District, and is a member of the Democratic party.

== Early life and education ==
Keyserling was born in Beaufort, South Carolina. He graduated from Brandeis University in 1971 and Boston University in 1974.

== Political career ==
=== Mayor of Beaufort ===
Keyserling was elected Mayor of Beaufort in 2008, serving twelve years and three terms. One of his achievements was helping to establish the Reconstruction Era National Historical Park in the city. In 2020, Keyserling announced his decision not to run for re-election.

=== Beaufort City Council ===
Keyserling served sixteen years on Beaufort City Council, with twelve as Mayor.

=== South Carolina House of Representatives ===
Keyserling served two terms in the South Carolina House of Representatives from 1991 until 1995, succeeding his mother, Harriet Keyserling.

== Civic organizations ==
Organizations Keyserling was involved in included:

- Beaufort Marine Institute
- Mainstreet Beaufort, USA
- Greater Beaufort Chamber of Commerce
- Beaufort Council Navy League
- Beaufort Little Theatre Arts Council

== Honors and recognitions ==
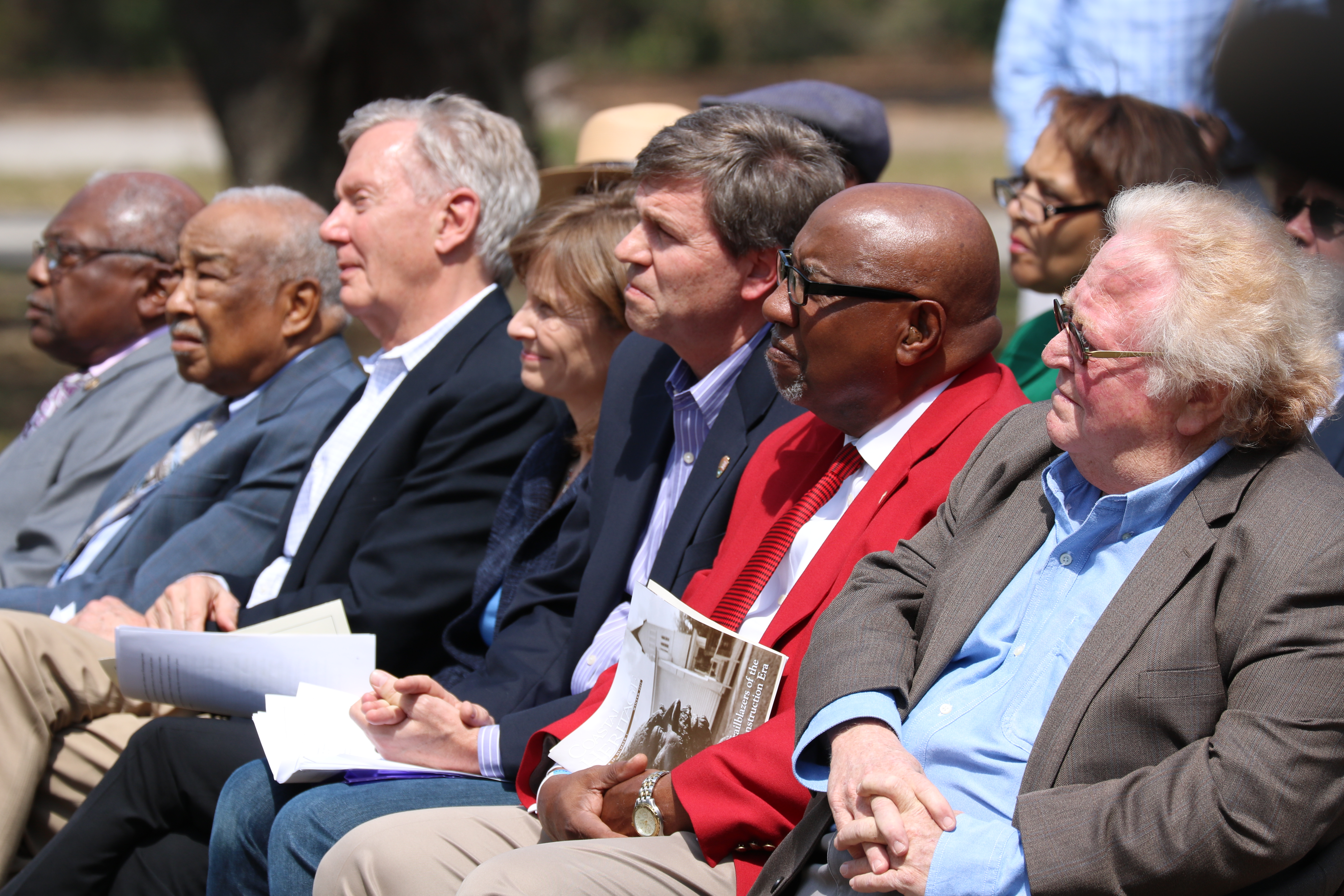
Keyserling (far right), Congressman Jim Clyburn (far left) and other elected officials look on during dedication of Reconstruction Era National Historic Park,2017.

In June 2025, Keyserling was presented with the Order of the Palmetto by South Carolina State House Representative Shannon Erickson
