= Susan M. Phillips =

American economist and government official (born 1944)

Susan Phillips
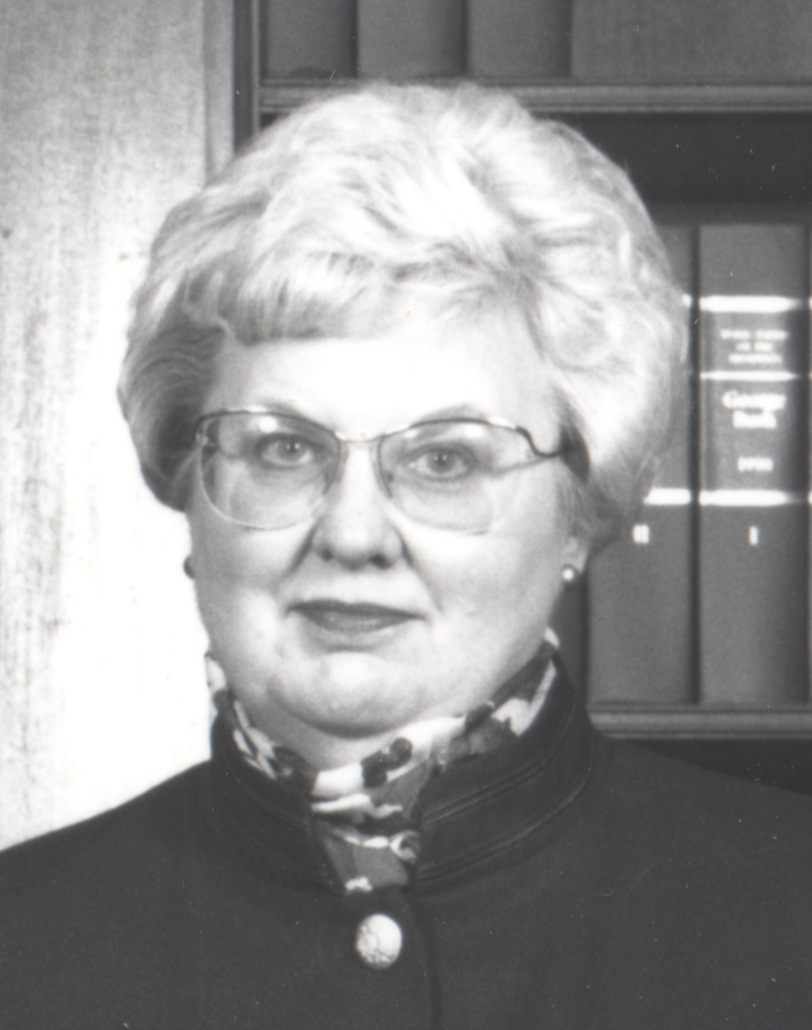

Member of the Federal Reserve Board of Governors
- In office December 2, 1991 – June 30, 1998
- President: George H. W. Bush
- Preceded by: Martha Seger
- Succeeded by: Susan Bies

Personal details
- Born: January 23, 1944 (age 81) Richmond, Virginia, U.S.
- Education: Agnes Scott College (BA); Louisiana State University, Baton Rouge (MS, PhD)

Susan Meredith Phillips (born January 23, 1944) is an American economist who served as a member of the Federal Reserve Board of Governors from 1991 to 1998. She was the third woman to sit on the Board. After leaving the Fed, Phillips served as dean of the George Washington University School of Business from 1998 to 2010.

== Early life and education ==
Susan Phillips was born January 23, 1944, in Richmond, Virginia. As part of a military family she spent time in Florida, Georgia, Louisiana and lived abroad in Germany and The United Kingdom. She earned a bachelor's degree in mathematics from Agnes Scott College in 1967. At Louisiana State University she studied to receive a master's degree in finance and insurance in 1971, and a PhD in finance and economics in 1973.

== Academic career ==
After a brief period as an assistant professor at Louisiana State, Phillips became an assistant professor of business administration at the University of Iowa from 1974 to 1976. After working as an economic policy fellow at the Brookings Institution in 1976 and 1977 she returned to the University of Iowa in 1978 as an associate professor.

Phillips went on to lead the University of Iowa's finances. Serving first as acting Associate Vice President for Finance and University Services in 1979, she was confirmed as an Associate Vice President of Finance and University Services in 1980. Her tenure at the University of Iowa was interrupted by her departure to work at the Commodity Futures Trading Commission in 1981, but she returned as Vice President in 1987 where she continued to work until appointed to the Federal Reserve.

== Government service ==
Phillips was appointed a commissioner on the Commodity Futures Trading Commission in 1981. When elevated commission's chair in 1983, she became the first woman to lead a US financial regulatory agency. She resigned in 1987 to return to the University of Iowa.

In September 1991, Phillips was appointed by President George H. W. Bush to serve the remainder of Martha R. Seger's term as a governor of the Federal Reserve Board. With her swearing in on December 2, 1991, she became the third woman to hold that post. Phillips' appointment, along with that of Lawrence Lindsey, was initially seen as key to building support in the Federal Open Market Committee for lower interest rates. Later installment of Janet Yellen as governor makes the first time that two women have sat on the Federal Reserve Board. Her term expired on January 31, 1998, but she continued to serve on the board until June 30, 1998, since no successor had been appointed.

== George Washington University ==
After leaving the Federal Reserve in 1998 Susan Phillips became Dean of the George Washington University School of Business in Washington, D.C. While dean, she oversaw fundraising and construction efforts as the school rose in rank.

== Retirement ==
Phillips retired from George Washington University in June 2010, intending to return to Fort Walton Beach, Florida, where she grew up.

Government offices
Preceded by Martha Seger	Member of the Federal Reserve Board of Governors; 1991–1998	Succeeded by Susan Bies
