= Leon Keyserling =

American economist

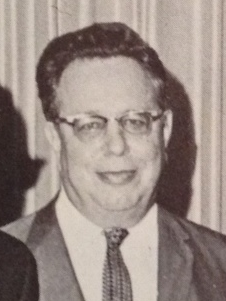
- Keyserling 1949

2nd Chair of the Council of Economic Advisers
- In office November 2, 1949 – January 20, 1953; Acting: November 2, 1949 – May 10, 1950
- President: Harry S. Truman
- Preceded by: Edwin Griswold Nourse
- Succeeded by: Arthur F. Burns

Personal details
- Born: January 11, 1908 Charleston, South Carolina, U.S.
- Died: August 9, 1987 (aged 79) Washington, D.C., U.S.
- Party: Democratic
- Spouse: Mary Dublin
- Relatives: Billy Keyserling (nephew); Harriet Keyserling (sister-in-law)
- Education: Columbia University (BA); Harvard University (JD)

Leon Hirsch Keyserling (January 11, 1908 – August 9, 1987) was an American economist and lawyer who was chairman of the Council of Economic Advisers from 1950 to 1953. During his tenure, he advised President Harry S. Truman on the economic issues and helped draft major pieces of Fair Deal legislation.

== Early life ==
Keyserling was born in 1908 in Charleston, South Carolina and grew up on Saint Helena Island. He earned an A.B. from Columbia University in 1928 and a Juris Doctor degree from Harvard Law School in 1931. He returned to Columbia as a graduate student in the Department of Economics from 1931 to 1933, where he also taught for a short time. While there, Keyserling studied under Rexford Tugwell, but never finished his dissertation.

Keyserling's wife, Mary Dublin Keyserling, was also an economist.

== Government career ==
In 1933 Keyserling became an attorney for the newly constituted Agricultural Adjustment Administration, a New Deal agency that distributed subsidies to reduce crop area. From 1933 to 1946 he was a consultant economist to the Senate on a variety of social, economic, industrial, and financial issues, during which time he also was a legislative assistant to Democratic New York Senator Robert F. Wagner (1933–37) and held several positions, including general counsel, in the US Housing Authority (later, the Federal Public Housing Authority in the National Housing Agency) (1937–46). It was during his time with Wagner that Keyserling was participating in drafting various New Deal initiatives, including the National Industrial Recovery Act, the Social Security Act, and the National Labor Relations Act.

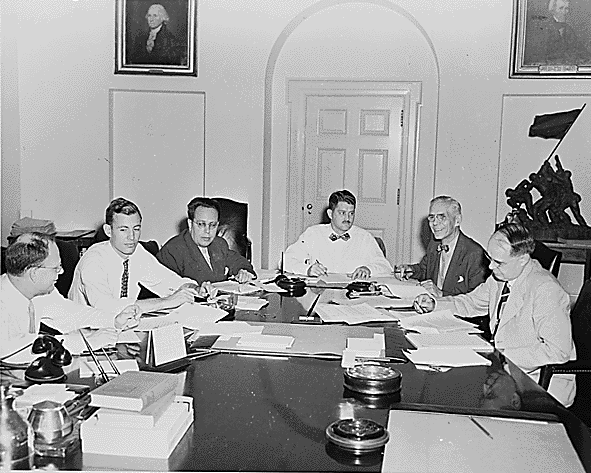
Photograph of members of the1949 Council of Economic Advisers and White House staff members working on the President's Midyear Economic Report in the Cabinet Room: (from left to right) Charles S. Murphy, Administrative Assistant to the President; David E. Bell, Special Assistant in the White House Office; Keyserling; Vice Chairman of the Council of Economic Advisers; Robert Turner, consultant on the White House staff; Edwin Griswold Nourse, Chairman of the Council of Economic Advisers; and John Davidson Clark, member of the Council of Economic Advisers

In 1946 Keyserling became the Vice Chairman of the newly created Council of Economic Advisers. He became its Acting Chairman in 1949 and the chairman in 1950. In 1952 Keyserling and his wife were attacked by Joseph McCarthy as part of the Second Red Scare as "belonging to Communist front groups." Keyserling left as chairman in 1953.

During his time at the CEA, Keyserling strongly promoted the pursuit of sustained economic growth and full employment. He also introduced the reporting of the Gross National Product in real as well as nominal dollars

== Later life ==
Following his time advising President Truman, Keyserling consulted with Congress on a variety of economic issues and also practiced law. In 1954 he founded the Conference on Economic Progress (CEP), and was its president until 1987. His wife had left the Department of Commerce in 1953 and joined him in consulting as well as the founding of the CEP, where she was associate director from its inception to 1963.

In 1969 Keyserling was president of the National Committee for Labor in Israel, a US organization that worked with the Israeli Histadrut.

He died on August 9, 1987, at Washington, D.C.'s George Washington University Hospital.

== Writings ==
Based on Leon H. Keyserling Papers in the Harry S. Truman Presidential Library and Museum.

- Redirecting Education (with Rexford Tugwell) (1934)
- Toward Full Employment and Full Production (1954)
- Consumption-Key to Full Prosperity (1957)
- The Federal Budget and the General Welfare (1959)
- The Peace by Investment Corporation (with Benjamin Javitts) (1962)
- Taxes and the Public Interest (1963)
- Progress or Poverty (1964)
- The Move Toward Railroad Mergers (1965)
- A Freedom Budget for All Americans (1966)
- The Scarcity School of Economics (1973)
- Liberal and Conservative National Economic Policies and Their Consequences, 1919-79 (1979)
- The Current Significance of the New Deal (1984)

Political offices
Preceded by Edwin Nourse	Chair of the Council of Economic Advisers; 1949–1953; Acting: 1949–1950	Succeeded by Arthur Burns
