= John H. Hamlin =

- Born: June 21, 1909; Wilkinsburg, Pennsylvania, USA
- Died: April 1981 (aged 71)
- Education: Stanford University (A.B., 1929)
- Occupations: Intelligence Officer, Executive Secretary, Director for Small Business, Executive Assistant to the President
- Years active: 1940s–1950s
- Known for: Service in WWII, Executive role under President Dwight D. Eisenhower
- Title: Executive Assistant to the President

John H. Hamlin (June 21, 1909 – April 1981) graduated from Stanford University with an A.B. in 1929. He was born in Wilkinsburg, Pennsylvania.

Hamlin had a multifaceted career. During World War II, Hamlin was an intelligence officer in the Navy and retired as a Lieutenant Commander in 1945. From 1946 to 1951, Hamlin served as Executive Secretary to the Republican State Central Committee of California.

In 1954, Hamlin was appointed the Director for Small Business for the Department of Defense. Two years later in his role as the executive Assistant to the President (under President Dwight D. Eisenhower), Hamlin fulfilled a political function. His duties were to keep various segments of the Executive Branch and the Republican National Committee aware of each other's activities. He compiled background reports on the large agencies, current administration problems, pronouncements and goals. These reports were actually in-depth analyses of what the different agencies were doing and what they were spending. Eventually these background reports became progress reports designed to alert the White House Staff and other members of the Eisenhower "team" to developments in different agencies which might warrant study or action, especially if they had economic implications. These reports could be used by Republican members to analyze what the Administration was doing and to provide speech materials.

In addition to the progress reports, Hamlin also compiled a number of studies on the activities of government agencies and departments for the consideration of the Committee on Government Activities Affecting Prices and Costs. The purpose of the Committee on Government Activities Affecting Prices and Costs created by Executive Order 10802, January 23, 1959, was to provide a central mechanism in the Federal Government to follow the current activities of the Federal agencies to see whether they were being conducted, insofar as possible, in line with the need for reasonable stability of prices and costs, and to ensure that the Federal Government was not contributing to the nation's inflationary problems by the way in which it conducted its business. The Chairman of the President's Council of Economic Advisers, Raymond J. Saulnier, was designated as the Chairman of the Committee on Government Activities Affecting Prices and Costs.
