= Tom Davis (South Carolina politician) =

American politician

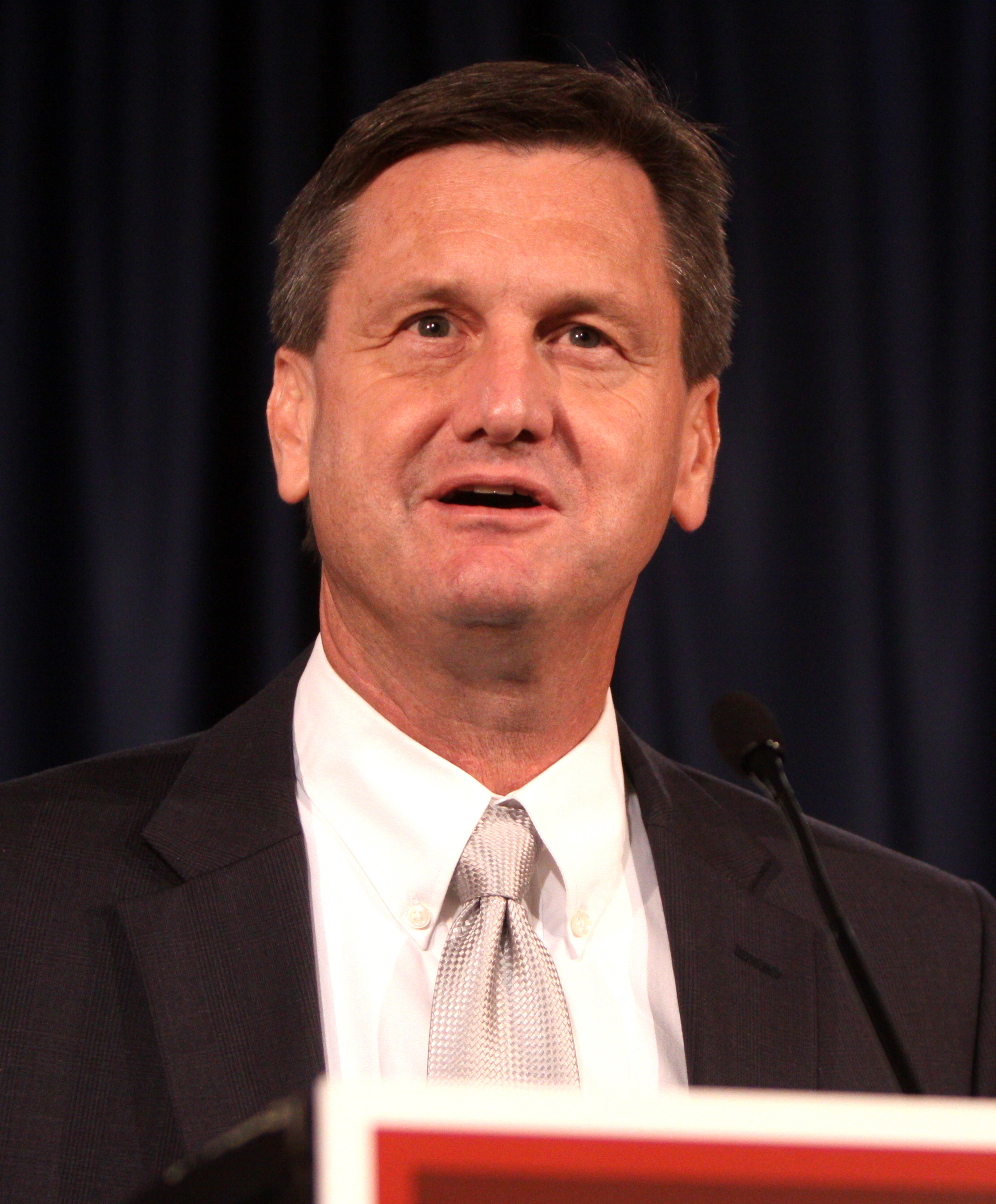

Member of the South Carolina Senate from the 46th district
- Incumbent
- Assumed office January 14, 2009
- Preceded by: Catherine C. Ceips

Personal details
- Born: May 31, 1960 (age 66) New Brunswick, New Jersey
- Party: South Carolina Republican Party
- Spouse: Reid Davis
- Education: Furman University (BA); University of Maryland (JD)
- Profession: Attorney

Thomas C. Davis (born May 31, 1960) is a Republican member of the South Carolina Senate since January 14, 2009. His district (the 46th) includes part of Beaufort County.

== Education and law career ==
Davis graduated magna cum laude in 1982 from Furman University, where he was inducted into Phi Beta Kappa. He was a member of the Order of the Coif with highest honors at the University of Maryland School of Law, whence he graduated in 1985.

He has worked at the Harvey & Battey law firm in Beaufort, South Carolina, since 1985 and is the managing partner of its Real Estate Department.

== Political activity ==
Davis has been involved in local and state government for many years.

=== Local government ===
Davis' activities in the Beaufort area have included service on a four-county council of governments, the county planning board, the Historic Beaufort Foundation, and the local water & sewer authority.

=== State of South Carolina ===
==== Executive ====
Davis served as Chief of Staff to Governor Mark Sanford and as co-campaign-manager in both of Sanford's elections to the office of governor. He led the initiative by Sanford's office to pass South Carolina's charter school reform bill in the legislature. He has also been a member of the South Carolina State Ports Authority board and successfully led South Carolina's negotiations to build a deep water port with Georgia on his state's side of the Savannah River in Jasper County.

==== Legislative ====
In the June 10, 2008 Republican primary election for the District 46 Senate seat, Davis defeated the incumbent senator Catherine Ceips, 56% to 44%, then went on to defeat Democrat Kent Fletcher in the general election November 4, 2008, winning 65% of the vote. Davis is currently assigned to the Agriculture and Natural Resources, Banking and Insurance, Education, Judiciary, and Rules Committees of the Senate.

==== South Carolina 2018 gubernatorial election ====
Despite rumors Davis was considering a bid for governor in 2018, Davis decided against running, deciding to stay in the state Senate. After incumbent governor Henry McMaster was unable to win the Republican nomination in the June 12 primary, Davis endorsed McMaster's challenger John Warren, who is running as an outsider candidate with business and military experience, despite not having any political experience.

In 2024, Davis was among the state legislators appointed to serve on the Robert Smalls Monument Commission.

=== National politics ===
In January 2012, Davis endorsed U.S. Rep. Ron Paul for the Republican nomination for U.S. president.

Davis was elected as a South Carolina Republican delegate to the 2012 Republican National Convention.

Davis endorsed Nikki Haley in February 2023 ahead of the 2024 Republican primary.

== Personal life ==
Davis has three daughters with his wife, Reid.
