= Walter Heller =

American economist (1915–1987)

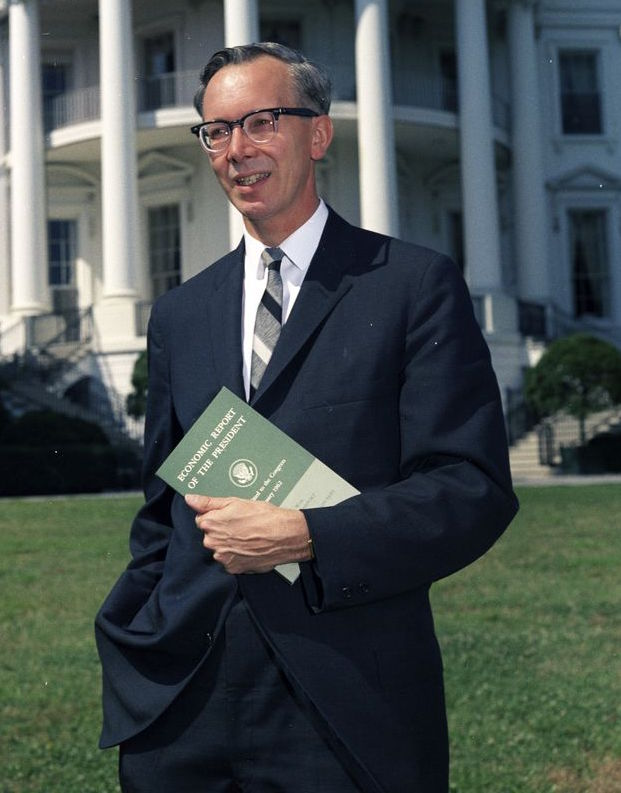
- Heller in 1962

5th Chair of the Council of Economic Advisers
- In office January 29, 1961 – November 15, 1964
- President: John F. Kennedy; Lyndon Johnson
- Preceded by: Raymond Saulnier
- Succeeded by: Gardner Ackley

Personal details
- Born: Walter Wolfgang Heller; August 27, 1915 Buffalo, New York, U.S.
- Died: June 15, 1987 (aged 71) Silverdale, Washington, U.S.
- Party: Democratic
- Education: Oberlin College (BA); University of Wisconsin, Madison (MA, PhD)

Walter Wolfgang Heller (27 August 1915 – 15 June 1987) was a leading American economist of the 1960s, and an influential adviser to President John F. Kennedy as chairman of the Council of Economic Advisers, 1961–1964.

== Life and career ==
Heller was born in Buffalo, New York, to German immigrants, Gertrude (Warmburg) and Ernst Heller, a civil engineer. After attending Shorewood High School in Shorewood, Wisconsin, he entered Oberlin College in 1931, graduating with a B.A. degree in 1935. Heller received his master's degree and doctorate degrees in economics from the University of Wisconsin.

As a Keynesian, he promoted cuts in the marginal federal income tax rates. This tax cut, which was passed by President Lyndon B. Johnson and Congress after Kennedy's death, was credited for boosting the U.S. economy. Heller developed the first "voluntary" wage-price guidelines. When the steel industry failed to follow them, it was publicly attacked by Kennedy and quickly complied. Heller was one of the first to emphasize that tax deductions and tax preferences narrowed the income tax base, thus requiring, for a given amount of revenue, higher marginal tax rates. The historic tax cut and its positive effect on the economy has often been cited as motivation for more recent tax cuts by Republicans.

The day after Kennedy was assassinated, Heller met with President Johnson in the Oval Office. To get the country going again, Heller suggested a major initiative he called the "War on Poverty", which Johnson adopted enthusiastically. Later, when Johnson insisted on escalating the Vietnam War without raising taxes, setting the stage for an inflationary spiral, Heller resigned.

In the early phases of his career, Heller contributed to the creation of the Marshall Plan of 1947, and was instrumental in re-establishing the German currency following World War II, which helped usher an economic boom in West Germany.

Heller was critical of Milton Friedman's followers and labelled them cultish: "Some of them are Friedmanly, some Friedmanian, some Friedmanesque, some Friedmanic and some Friedmaniacs."

Heller joined the University of Minnesota faculty as an associate professor of economics in 1945, left for a few years to serve in government, and returned in the 1960s, eventually serving as chair of the Department of Economics. He built it into a top-ranked department with spectacular hires, including future Nobel Prize winners Leonid Hurwicz (2007), Edward C. Prescott (2004), Thomas J. Sargent (2011) and Christopher A. Sims (2011).

Heller was elected to the American Academy of Arts and Sciences in 1962 and the American Philosophical Society in 1975.

Heller died in Silverdale, Washington on June 15, 1987, at the age of 71. In 1999, the University of Minnesota renamed the Management and Economics Tower, located on the West Bank of their Minneapolis campus, Walter W. Heller Hall in honor of the late Walter Heller. The building houses student advising services in addition to providing classroom space.

In 2010, the University of Minnesota Department of Economics announced the creation of the Heller-Hurwicz Economics Institute, honoring the legacies of Walter Heller and fellow Minnesota faculty member Leonid Hurwicz.

== Primary sources ==
- Heller, Walter. Monetary vs. Fiscal Policy (a dialogue with Milton Friedman). 1969.
- Heller, Walter. New Dimensions of Political Economy. 1966.

Political offices
| Preceded by Raymond Saulnier | Chair of the Council of Economic Advisers; 1961–1964 | Succeeded by Gardner Ackley |
