= Edie Rodgers =

American politician (born 1934)

Member of the South Carolina House of Representatives from the 124th district
- Preceded by: Billy Keyserling
- Succeeded by: Catherine C. Ceips

Personal details
- Born: Edith Martin; February 4, 1934 (age 92) Gaffney, South Carolina, U.S.
- Party: Republican
- Education: Bolen's Business College

Edith Martin 'Edie' Rodgers (born February 4, 1934) is an American politician. She is a former member of the South Carolina House of Representatives from the 124th District, and is a member of the Republican party.

== Early life and education ==
Rodgers was born in Gaffney, South Carolina and educated at Bolen's Business College in Augusta, Georgia.

== Political career ==
=== South Carolina House of Representatives ===
Rodgers served in the South Carolina House of Representatives from 1997 until 2002, when she decided not to seek re-election. She had previously served on Beaufort County Council from 1989 to 1993. Rodgers earned the nicknames "steel magnolia" and "Martha Stewart" of the House.

During her service as President of the Beaufort Area Republican Club, Rodgers hosted Vice President George H. W. Bush, a candidate in the 1988 United States Presidential Election, in an engagement with reporters at her home.

Rodgers, now in her 90's, occasionally provides public comment on political policy.

== Civic organizations ==
Rodgers help to found the Beaufort Museum, serving as its first President. She served on the Historic Beaufort Foundation Board. Rodgers was also a charter member of the Lady's Island Garden Club.

== Honors and recognitions ==
In 2024, Rodgers received the Lifetime of Leadership Civitas Award from the Beaufort Chamber of Commerce.
