= Arthur F. Burns =

American economist and diplomat (1904–1987)

Arthur Burns
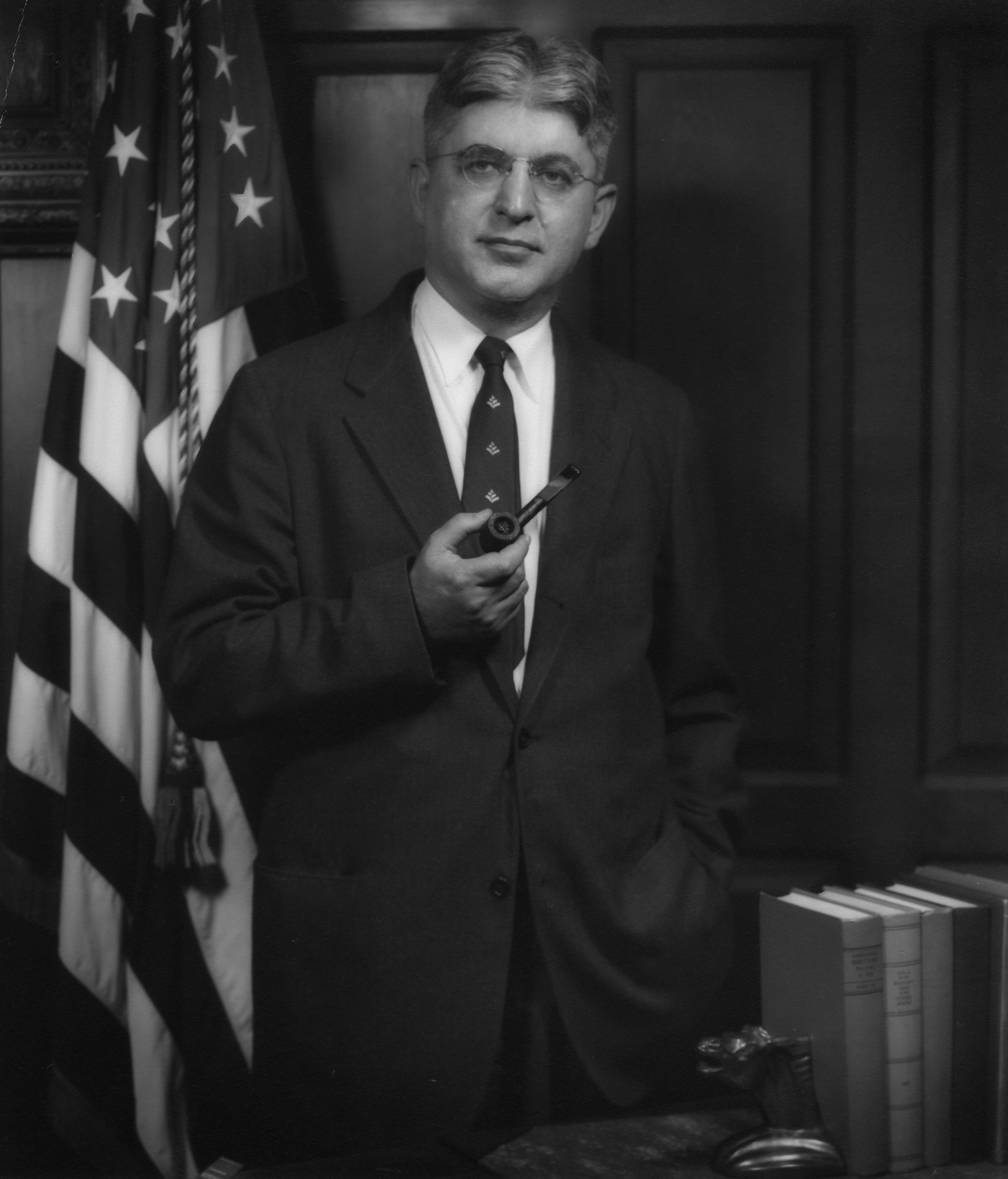

United States Ambassador to West Germany
- In office June 30, 1981 – May 16, 1985
- President: Ronald Reagan
- Preceded by: Walter J. Stoessel Jr.
- Succeeded by: Richard Burt

10th Chairman of the Federal Reserve
- In office February 1, 1970 – January 31, 1978
- President: Richard Nixon; Gerald Ford; Jimmy Carter
- Deputy: James Robertson; George W. Mitchell; Stephen Gardner
- Preceded by: William McChesney Martin
- Succeeded by: G. William Miller

Member of the Federal Reserve Board of Governors
- In office January 31, 1970 – March 31, 1978
- President: Richard Nixon; Gerald Ford; Jimmy Carter
- Preceded by: William McChesney Martin
- Succeeded by: Nancy Teeters

Counselor to the President
- In office January 20, 1969 – November 5, 1969
- President: Richard Nixon
- Preceded by: Position established
- Succeeded by: Bryce Harlow; Daniel Patrick Moynihan

3rd Chairman of the Council of Economic Advisers
- In office March 19, 1953 – December 1, 1956
- President: Dwight D. Eisenhower
- Preceded by: Leon Keyserling
- Succeeded by: Raymond J. Saulnier

Personal details
- Born: Arthur Frank Burns; April 27, 1904 Stanislau, Austria-Hungary (now Ivano-Frankivsk, Ukraine)
- Died: June 26, 1987 (aged 83) Baltimore, Maryland, U.S.
- Party: Democratic
- Spouse: Helen Bernstein
- Education: Columbia University (BA, MA, PhD)

Arthur Frank Burns (April 27, 1904 – June 26, 1987) was an American economist and diplomat who served as the 10th chairman of the Federal Reserve from 1970 to 1978. He previously chaired the Council of Economic Advisers under President Dwight D. Eisenhower from 1953 to 1956 and served as the first Counselor to the President under Richard Nixon from January to November 1969. He also taught and researched at Rutgers University, Columbia University, and the National Bureau of Economic Research.

President Nixon nominated him to succeed William McChesney Martin as Chairman of the Federal Reserve and later renominated him for another term. Burns was succeeded by G. William Miller when his second term expired, and then President Ronald Reagan chose him to serve as Ambassador to West Germany in 1981, where he remained in office until 1985.

== Early life and education ==
Burns was born in Stanislau (now Ivano-Frankivsk), Austrian Poland (Galicia), a province of the Austro-Hungarian Empire, in 1904 to Polish-Jewish parents, Sarah Juran and Nathan Burnseig, who worked as a house painter. He showed aptitude early in his childhood, when he translated the Talmud into Polish and Russian by age six and debated socialism at age nine. In 1914, he immigrated to Bayonne, New Jersey, with his parents. He graduated from Bayonne High School.

At age 17, Burns enrolled in Columbia University on a scholarship offered by the university secretary. He worked in jobs ranging from postal clerk to shoe salesman during his time at Columbia as a student before earning his B.A. and M.A. in 1925, graduating Phi Beta Kappa.

== Academic career ==
=== Rutgers University ===
After college, he began teaching economics at Rutgers University in 1927, a role that he continued until 1944. Burns through his lectures became one of two professors, the other being Homer Jones, credited by Milton Friedman as a key influence for his decision to become an economist. Burns had convinced Friedman, Rutgers class of 1932, that modern economics could help end the Great Depression.

In 1930, he married Helen Bernstein, a teacher.

Burns pursued graduate studies at Columbia while continuing his lectures at Rutgers. As a doctoral student, he became a protege of Wesley Clair Mitchell, a founder and the chief economics researcher of the National Bureau of Economic Research. In 1933, Burns joined the NBER under Mitchell's guidance and began a lifelong study of business cycles. He received his Ph.D. in economics from Columbia a year later.

In 1943 he was elected as a Fellow of the American Statistical Association. In 1944, he left Rutgers and assumed the role of director of research at the NBER in 1945 following Mitchell's retirement.

=== Columbia University ===
In 1945, Burns became a professor at Columbia University. In 1959, he received the John Bates Clark endowed chair. At Columbia, he blocked the acceptance of Murray Rothbard's thesis on the Panic of 1819, despite having known Rothbard since the latter was a child.

During his time at Columbia, Burns was elected a member of both the American Academy of Arts and Sciences and the American Philosophical Society.

=== National Bureau of Economic Research ===
Beginning in 1933, the academic part of Burns's career focused on the measurement of business cycles, including questions such as the duration of economic expansions, and what economic variables rise during expansions and fall during recessions. In 1934, Burns wrote Production Trends in the United States Since 1870 his first major publication in the field.

Often, he collaborated with Wesley Clair Mitchell, whose research directorate role he assumed from 1945 to 1953. In 1946, Burns and Mitchell published Measuring Business Cycles, which presented the characteristic NBER methods of analyzing business cycles. During his tenure, Burns began the academic tradition of determining recessions, a role continued by the NBER's business cycle dating committee. Today, the NBER is still considered authoritative in dating recessions.

In the late 1940s, Burns asked Milton Friedman, then a professor at the University of Chicago, to join the NBER as a researcher of the role of money in the business cycle. Burns's detailed macroeconomic analysis influenced Milton Friedman and Anna Schwartz's classic work A Monetary History of the United States, 1867–1960.

== Public service ==
=== Counselor to the President ===
Burns was appointed as Counselor to the President when Richard Nixon took office in 1969. The newly created position held cabinet rank and was meant as a placeholder until Burns could be appointed as Chairman of the Federal Reserve. Burns advised Nixon on economic policy during his brief time in the White House.

As expected, Burns was appointed to replace the outgoing William McChesney Martin as Fed Chairman in November 1969 and resigned his post in the Nixon administration.

=== Federal Reserve Chairman ===
Burns served as Fed Chairman from February 1970 until the end of January 1978. He has a reputation of having been overly influenced by political pressure in his monetary policy decisions during his time as Chairman and for supporting the policy, widely accepted in political and economic circles at the time, that Fed action should try to maintain an unemployment rate of around 4 percent.

While Vice President Richard Nixon was running for President in 1959–1960, the Fed, under Truman-appointed chairman William McChesney Martin, Jr., was undertaking monetary tightening, increasing the cost of borrowing and reflected in a recession by April 1960. In his book Six Crises, Nixon later blamed his defeat in 1960 in part on Fed policy and the resulting tight credit conditions and slow growth.

Later, when Burns resisted, negative press about him was planted in newspapers and, under the threat of legislation to dilute the Fed's influence, Burns and other Governors succumbed. Burns's relationship with Nixon was often rocky. Reflecting in his diary about a 1971 meeting attended by himself, Nixon, Treasury Secretary John Connally, the Chairman of the Council of Economic Advisors, and the Director of the Bureau of the Budget, Burns wrote:

The President looked wild; talked like a desperate man; fulminated with hatred against the press; took some of us to task – apparently meaning me or [chairman of the Council of Economic Advisors, Paul] McCraken or both – for not putting a gay and optimistic face on every piece of economic news, however discouraging; propounded the theory that confidence can be best generated by appearing confident and coloring, if need be, the news.

There was significant inflation during this period, which Nixon attempted to manage through wage and price controls while the Fed under Burns increased the money supply. Although Burns opposed Nixon's decision to close the "gold window," he "'assured the President that I would support his new program fully,' notwithstanding his reservations about the gold suspension." After the 1972 election, due in part to oil shocks from the 1973 oil crisis, price controls began to fail and by 1974, the inflation rate was 12.3 percent.

Burns thought the country was not willing to accept rates of unemployment in the range of six percent as a means of quelling inflation. From the Board of Governors meeting minutes of November 1970, Burns believed that:

...prospects were dim for any easing of the cost-push inflation generated by union demands. However, the Federal Reserve could not do anything about those influences except to impose monetary restraint, and he did not believe the country was willing to accept for any long period an unemployment rate in the area of 6 percent. Therefore, he believed that the Federal Reserve should not take on the responsibility for attempting to accomplish by itself, under its existing powers, a reduction in the rate of inflation to, say, 2 percent... he did not believe that the Federal Reserve should be expected to cope with inflation single-handedly. The only effective answer, in his opinion, lay in some form of incomes policy.

During Burns's tenure, the rate of change of the consumer price index rose from 6%/year in early 1970 to over 12%/year in late 1974 after the Arab Oil embargo, and eventually falling to under 7%/year from 1976 to the end of his tenure in January, 1978, with an annual average rate of consumer price inflation of approximately 9% during his term. Negative economic events included multiple oil shocks (1973 and 1979) and heavy government deficits arising in part from the Vietnam War and Great Society government programs.

At the Watergate break-in of 1972, the burglars were found carrying $6300 of sequentially numbered $100 bills. The Fed lied to reporter Bob Woodward as to the source of the bills. Burns stonewalled Congressional investigations about them and issued a directive to all Fed offices prohibiting any discussion of the subject.

In 1976, Burns received the U.S. Senator John Heinz Award for Greatest Public Service by an Elected or Appointed Official, an award given out annually by Jefferson Awards.

=== American Enterprise Institute ===
William Baroody, then president of the American Enterprise Institute, brought Burns to the economics think tank in 1978 after Burns left his position at the Federal Reserve. From the AEI, Burns continued to influence public policy.

=== Ambassador to West Germany ===
Arthur Burns was appointed United States Ambassador to West Germany by President Ronald Reagan. He served in Bonn from June 1981 to May 1985.

=== Death ===
He died on June 26, 1987 from complications of cardiac bypass surgery, at Johns Hopkins Hospital in Baltimore, Maryland.

== Criticism ==
Conservative economist Bruce Bartlett gives Burns poor marks for his tenure as Fed chairman because the inflationary forces that began in 1970 took more than a decade to resolve.

The only disagreement among economists is whether Burns fully understood the mistakes he was making, or was so wedded to incorrect Keynesian theories that he didn't realize what he was doing. The only alternative is that he was under irresistible political pressure from Nixon and had no choice. Neither explanation is very favorable to Burns. Economists now recognize the Nixon era as Exhibit A in how the adoption of bad economic policies in pursuit of short-term political gain eventually turns out to be bad politics as well.

In more recent years, the famous quote, "The ultimate purpose of an economy is to produce more consumer goods," has erroneously been attributed to Burns in popular culture. However, there is no evidence that Burns uttered this statement; to the contrary, both his speeches and his policies record his advocacy for thrift and fiscal responsibility.

== Selected works ==
- Burns, Arthur Frank; Mitchell, Wesley C., Measuring Business Cycles, National Bureau of Economic Research (Studies in Business Cycles), 1946
- Burns, Arthur Frank, Wesley Clair Mitchell: The Economic Scientist. New York: National Bureau of Economic Research, 1952
- Burns, Arthur Frank, The Frontiers of Economic Knowledge: Essays, Princeton University Press, 1954. Reprinted from a National Bureau of Economic Research publication.
- Burns, Arthur Frank, Prosperity Without Inflation, Buffalo, Smith, Keynes & Marshall; distributed by Doubleday, Garden City, N.Y., 1958
- Burns, Arthur Frank, et al., The Anguish of Central Banking, Per Jacobsson Foundation, 1979

== See also ==
- Economic Cycle Research Institute

== Sources ==
- Abrams, Burton A. (Fall 2006). "How Richard Nixon Pressured Arthur Burns: Evidence from the Nixon Tapes". Journal of Economic Perspectives. 20 (4). American Economic Association: 177–188. doi:10.1257/jep.20.4.177.
- Burns, Arthur F. Inside the Nixon Administration: The Secret Diary of Arthur Burns, 1969–1974 (University Press of Kansas, 2010); reviewed by Doug French, "Burns Diary Exposes the Myth of Fed Independence," Mises Institute.
- Burns, Arthur F. Reflections of an Economic Policy Maker: Speeches and Congressional Statements: 1969–1978 (AEI Studies no. 217; Washington: American Enterprise Inst., 1978); reviewed by Paul W. McCracken, "Reflections of an Economic Policy Maker: a Review Article" in Journal of Economic Literature 1980 18(2): 579–585. ISSN 0022-0515 Fulltext online at Jstor and Ebsco.
- Burns, Arthur F. "Progress Towards Economic Stability." American Economic Review 1960 50(1): 1–19. ISSN 0002-8282 Fulltext in Jstor and Ebsco. Abstract: Views economic growth, 1929–59; discusses corporate growth, government subsidies, increased consumer expenditures, rise in personal income, industrialization, and overall improvement in economic organization.
- Engelbourg, Saul. "The Council of Economic Advisers and the Recession of 1953–1954." Business History Review 1980 54(2): 192–214. ISSN 0007-6805 Fulltext in Jstor. Abstract: The 1953–54 recession was the first in which a Council of Economic Advisers (CEA) appointed by a Republican president, Dwight D. Eisenhower, recommended policy actions. Despite traditional Republican Party rhetoric, the CEA supported an activist contracyclical approach that helped to establish Keynesianism as a bipartisan economic policy for the nation. Especially important in formulating the CEA response to the recession – accelerating public works programs, easing credit, and reducing taxes – were Arthur F. Burns and Neil H. Jacoby.
- Hetzel, Robert L. (Winter 1998). "Arthur Burns and Inflation". Economic Quarterly. 84 (1). Federal Reserve Bank of Richmond: 21–44.
- Meltzer, Allan H. (2009). A History of the Federal Reserve – Volume 2, Book 1: 1951–1969. Chicago: University of Chicago Press. pp. 486–682. ISBN 978-0226520025.
- Meltzer, Allan H. (2009). A History of the Federal Reserve – Volume 2, Book 2: 1970–1986. Chicago: University of Chicago Press. pp. 683–1005. ISBN 978-0226213514.
- Throckmorton, H. Bruce. "The Moral Suasion of Arthur F. Burns: 1970–1977." Essays in Economic and Business History 1991 9: 111–121. ISSN 0896-226X. Abstract: Reviews key words in Arthur F. Burns's testimony on various occasions before the Joint Economic Committee of Congress while he served as chairman of the Board of Governors of the Federal Reserve System, 1970–78. Correlates the key words with rates of inflation and interest rates to determine if there is a relationship between key words of testimony and selected economic variables.
- Wells, Wyatt C. (1994). Economist in an Uncertain World: Arthur F. Burns and the Federal Reserve, 1970–1978. New York: Columbia University Press. ISBN 978-0231084963.

== Notes ==
Political offices
Preceded by Leon Keyserling	Chairman of the Council of Economic Advisers; 1953–1956	Succeeded by Raymond Saulnier
New office	Counselor to the President; 1969	Succeeded by Bryce Harlow
New office	Counselor to the President; 1969	Succeeded by Pat Moynihan
Government offices
Preceded by William McChesney Martin	Member of the Federal Reserve Board of Governors; 1970–1978	Succeeded by Nancy Teeters
Preceded by William McChesney Martin	Chairman of the Federal Reserve; 1970–1978	Succeeded by G. William Miller
Diplomatic posts
Preceded by Walter Stoessel	United States Ambassador to Germany; 1981–1985	Succeeded by Richard Burt
