= Raymond J. Saulnier =

American economist

Raymond Saulnier

4th Chair of the Council of Economic Advisers
- In office December 3, 1956 – January 20, 1961
- President: Dwight Eisenhower
- Preceded by: Arthur Burns
- Succeeded by: Walter Heller

Personal details
- Born: September 20, 1908 Hamilton, Massachusetts, U.S.
- Died: April 30, 2009 (aged 100) Chestertown, Maryland, U.S.
- Party: Republican
- Education: Middlebury College (BA); Tufts University (MA); Columbia University (PhD)

Raymond Joseph Saulnier (September 20, 1908 – April 30, 2009) was an American economist who served as the chairman of the Council of Economic Advisers from 1956 to 1961 under President Dwight D. Eisenhower.

== Education ==
Saulnier graduated Middlebury College, 1929 where he was President of the Class. He studied at Braker Teaching Fellowship at Tufts College (later Tufts University) where he earned an MA in economics in 1931. He earned his Ph.D. from Columbia University in 1938.

== Career ==
Saulnier was Director of the Financial Research Program at the National Bureau of Economic Research from 1946 to 1961. He initiated the use of economic indicators developed at the National Bureau within the White House and government in general. In 1959 while at the CEA, he provided the Economic Brief (with CEA staff member Irving Siegel and the Justice Department) that went to the Supreme Court making the economic case for terminating, by Taft-Hartley injunction, the industry-wide steel strike that was having a significant negative effect on the US economy. He was professor at Columbia University/Barnard from 1944 to 1973.

Saulnier was preceded by Arthur Burns as Chairman of the CEA (also of Columbia University) during Eisenhower's first term and Leon Keyserling, chairman during most of President Truman's term. Through his writings and personal letters to economists such as Herb Stein (Chairman of the CEA 1972–74) he argued for an independent, non-political CEA to advise the President and act as a resource outside of the politics of the Treasury Department.

== Personal ==
He married Estelle Sydney on March 17, 1934. He was the father of Mark Saulnier (December 31, 1934) and Alice Saulnier (June 8, 1938). He was a board member of several industrial and financial companies including New York Bank for Savings, American Stock Exchange, Missouri Pacific Railroad, American Potash and Chemical, Howmet Corporation, and Houdaille Industries. He was a consultant to Marine Midland Bank of New York and Harold Geneen, Chairman of International Telephone & Telegraph (ITT). He was a member of the Board of Trustees (Finance Committee), Middlebury College 1956–1973, as well as a member of the Century Club. Until his death, he resided in Chestertown, Maryland.

== See also ==
- John H. Hamlin

== Bibliography ==
Books

- Contemporary Monetary Theory, Columbia University, 1938.
- Constructive years: the U.S. economy under Eisenhower. University Press of America. October 1991. ISBN 978-0-8191-8367-5.
- A Selection of Papers: Personal, Political, and Professional, privately published 2007.

Articles

- "The Strategy of Economic Policy", Fordham University Press, 1962.
- "Three Budget Concepts: Which is Best?"'in Financial Policies in Transition, The M.L. Seidman Town Hall Lectures at Memphis State University 1968.
- "Do Deficits Matter?" in The Conservative Papers: 1964.
- "A Monetary and Fiscal Strategy for the 1970s"' in Republican Papers, 1968.
- Primary responsibility for the Economic Reports to the President 1957–1961, sent to Congress in January.
- 'An Economist's-Eye View of the World' from Fortune Magazine, May 1962.
- "Notes on the Economy", one- or two-page summaries of the economy and the outlook for financial markets, distributed to friends and colleagues several times (or more) during the year until November 2002.

Political offices
| Preceded by Arthur Burns | Chair of the Council of Economic Advisers; 1956–1961 | Succeeded by Walter Heller |
