= Robert Thurston Kent =

American mechanical engineer

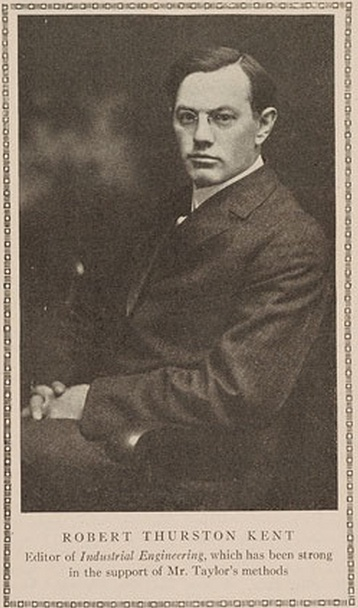
Robert Thurston Kent in The American Magazine, May 1911

Robert Thurston Kent (July 17, 1880 – March 23, 1947) was an American mechanical engineer, editor of Industrial Engineering and consultant, known as one of the foremen of scientific management.

== Biography ==
=== Youth and education ===
Born in Jersey City, New Jersey, Kent was one of the sons of William and Marion Weild (Smith) Kent. His father, William Kent (1851–1918) was a notable consulting engineer, college dean and author, and his younger brother Edward Raylor Kent would become a notable business executive.

Kent attended the Passaic High School graduating in 1896. In 1896 he started as machinist apprentice at Cooke Locomotive and Machine Works in Paterson, New Jersey and attended the Stevens Prep. School, where he graduated in 1898. In 1901 he obtained his MEng in mechanical engineering from the Stevens Institute of Technology.

=== Early career ===
After graduation Kent had started his career as Robins Conveying Belt Company in Passaic, New Jersey in 1902, moved to the Link Belt Corporation in Philadelphia in 1903, and was associate editor for the Electrical Review in New York in 1904. From 1905 to 1909 he was Engineering Editor at the Iron Trade Review in Cleveland, and from 1910 to 1915 at the Industrial Engineering journal in New York.

Back in industry Kent was construction engineer in New York from 1910 to 1917, and chief engineer at Meyer Morrison & Co. in New York from 1918 to 1920. From 1921 to 1923 he wrote Kent's mechanical engineers' handbook, and was superintendent at Prison Industries in the State of New York from 1924 to 1926. In the year 1927 to 1928 Kent served as general manager at the Bridgeport Brass Company in Connecticut 1927–1928, and from 1928 to 1934 he was director engineering and vice president of the Divine Brothers Company in Utica, New York.

=== Later career ===
In 1934 he started his private practice as construction engineer, yet got a new appointment in construction engineering at Montclair in New Jersey from 1934 to 1938. From 1938 to 1940 he was general manager at Wm. Sellers & Company in Philadelphia.

Just before the US got into World War II Kent was principal production engineer at the United States Army Ordnance Department for a year. In 1942 he joined Stevenson, Jordan & Harrison, New York City, where he worked in construction engineering. Kent was elected fellow of the American Society of Mechanical Engineers.

== Selected publications ==
- Gilbreth, Frank Bunker, and Robert Thurston Kent. Motion study. London: Constable, 1911.
- Kent, William, and Robert Thurston Kent. The Mechanical Engineers' Pocket-book. 1936.
- Kent, William, and Robert Thurston Kent. Kent's mechanical engineers' handbook: design, shop practice. Vol. 1. J. Wiley, 1936.

Articles, a selection

- Kent, Robert Thurston. "Micro-Motion Study in Industry." Iron Age 91 (1913): 34–37.
- Kent, Robert Thurston. "Possible Economies in Shop Transportation." Iron Age 92 (1913): 280–82.
- Kent, Robert Thurston. "The Utilization of Time-Study Data." American Machinist 42 (1915): 965–968.

Patents

- Robert, Thurston Kent. "Buffing wheel and method of making the same." U.S. Patent No. 2,024,691. 17 Dec. 1935.
