= Index of international trade articles =

This is a list of international trade topics.

- Absolute advantage
- Agreement on Trade-Related Aspects of Intellectual Property Rights (TRIPS)
- Asia-Pacific Economic Cooperation (APEC)
- Autarky
- Balance of trade
- Barter
- Bilateral Investment Treaty (BIT)
- Bimetallism
- Branch plant economy
- Bretton Woods conference
- Bretton Woods system
- British timber trade
- Cash crop
- Central European Free Trade Agreement (CEFTA)
- Comparative advantage
- Cost, Insurance and Freight (CIF)
- Council of Arab Economic Unity
- Currency
- Customs broking
- Customs union
- David Ricardo
- Doha Development Round (Of World Trade Organization)
- Dominican Republic – Central America Free Trade Agreement (DR-CAFTA)
- Enabling clause
- Enhanced Integrated Framework for Trade-Related Assistance for the Least Developed Countries
- European Union (EU)
- Export documents

- ATA Carnet
- ATR.1 certificate
- Certificate of origin
- EUR.1 movement certificate
- Form A
- Form B
- TIR Carnet

- European Free Trade Association (EFTA)
- Exchange rate
- Factor price equalization
- Fair trade
- Foreign direct investment (FDI)
- Foreign exchange option
- Foreign Sales Corporations (FSCs)
- Forfaiting
- Free Trade Area of the Americas (FTAA)
- Free On Board (FOB)
- Free trade
- Free trade area
- Free trade zone (FTZ)
- General Agreement on Tariffs and Trade (GATT)
- Generalized System of Preferences (GSP)
- Genetically modified food controversies
- Geographical pricing
- Giant sucking sound (a colorful phrase by Ross Perot)
- Global financial system (GFS)
- Globalization
- Gold standard
- Gravity model of trade
- Gresham's law
- Heckscher-Ohlin model (H-O model)
- Horizontal integration
- Import
- Import substitution industrialization (ISI)
- International Chamber of Commerce (ICC)
- International factor movements
- International law
- International Monetary Market (IMM)
- International Monetary Fund (IMF)
- International Trade Organization (ITO)
- Internationalization
- Internationalization and localization (G11n)
- ISO 4217 (international standard for currency codes)
- Leontief paradox
- Linder hypothesis
- List of tariffs and trade legislation
- Maquiladora
- Mercantilism
- Merchant bank
- Money market
- Most favoured nation (MFN)
- Nearshoring
- New Trade Theory (NTT)
- North American Free Trade Agreement (NAFTA)
- Offshore outsourcing
- Offshoring
- Organisation for Economic Co-operation and Development (OECD)
- Organization of the Petroleum Exporting Countries (OPEC)
- Outsourcing
- Purchasing power parity (PPP)
- Rules of origin
- Safeguard
- South Asia Free Trade Agreement (SAFTA)
- Special drawing rights (SDRs)
- Special Economic Zone (SEZ)
- Tariff
- Tax, tariff and trade
- Terms of trade (TOT)
- Tobin tax
- Trade
- Trade barrier
- Trade bloc
- Trade facilitation
- Trade Facilitation and Development
- Trade finance
- Trade pact
- Trade sanctions
- Trade war
- Transfer pricing
- Transfer problem
- United Nations Monetary and Financial Conference
- Uruguay Round (Of General Agreement on Tariffs and Trade)
- Wage insurance
- World Intellectual Property Organization (WIPO)
- World Intellectual Property Organization Copyright Treaty (WIPO Copyright Treaty)
- World Trade Organization (WTO)

== See also ==
- Outline of business management
- Outline of economics
- Outline of finance
- Outline of marketing
- Outline of production
- Index of accounting articles
- Outline of commercial law
- List of business theorists
- List of economists
