= Internationalization =

Increasing links to international markets

Internationalization or internationalisation is the process of increasing involvement of enterprises in international markets, although there is no agreed definition of internationalization. Internationalization is a crucial strategy not only for companies that seek horizontal integration globally but also for countries that addresses the sustainability of its development in different manufacturing as well as service sectors especially in higher education which is a very important context that needs internationalization to bridge the gap between different cultures and countries. There are several internationalization theories which try to explain why there are international activities.

== Entrepreneurs and enterprises ==
Those entrepreneurs who are interested in the field of internationalization of business need to possess the ability to think globally and have an understanding of international cultures. By appreciating and understanding different beliefs, values, behaviors and business strategies of a variety of companies within other countries, entrepreneurs will be able to internationalize successfully. Entrepreneurs must also have an ongoing concern for innovation, maintaining a high level of quality, be committed to corporate social responsibility, and continue to strive to provide the best business strategies and either goods or services possible while adapting to different countries and cultures.

== Trade theories ==
=== Absolute cost advantage (Adam Smith, 1776) ===
Adam Smith claimed that a country should specialise in, and export, commodities in which it had an absolute advantage. An absolute advantage existed when the country could produce a commodity with less costs per unit produced than could its trading partner. By the same reasoning, it should import commodities in which it had an absolute disadvantage.

While there are possible gains from trade with absolute advantage, comparative advantage extends the range of possible mutually beneficial exchanges. In other words, it is not necessary to have an absolute advantage to gain from trade, only a comparative advantage.

=== Comparative cost advantage (David Ricardo, 1817) ===
David Ricardo argued that a country does not need to have an absolute advantage in the production of any commodity for international trade between it and another country to be mutually beneficial. Absolute advantage meant greater efficiency in production, or the use of less labor factor in production. Two countries could both benefit from trade if each had a relative advantage in production. Relative advantage simply meant that the ratio of the labor embodied in the two commodities differed between two countries, such that each country would have at least one commodity where the relative amount of labor embodied would be less than that of the other country.

=== Gravity model of trade (Walter Isard, 1954) ===
The gravity model of trade in international economics, similar to other gravity models in social science, predicts bilateral trade flows based on the economic sizes of (often using GDP measurements) and distance between two units. The basic theoretical model for trade between two countries takes the form of:

$$F_{ij} = G \frac{M_i M_j}{D_{ij}}$$

with:

$F \,$: Trade flow

$i, j \,$: Country i and j

$M \,$: Economic mass, for example GDP

$D \,$: Distance

$G \,$: Constant

The model has also been used in international relations to evaluate the impact of treaties and alliances on trade, and it has been used to test the effectiveness of trade agreements and organizations such as the North American Free Trade Agreement (NAFTA) and the World Trade Organization (WTO).

=== Heckscher–Ohlin model (Eli Heckscher, 1966 & Bertil Ohlin, 1952) ===
The Heckscher–Ohlin model (H–O model), also known as the factors proportions development, is a general equilibrium mathematical model of international trade, developed by Eli Heckscher and Bertil Ohlin at the Stockholm School of Economics. It builds on David Ricardo's theory of comparative advantage by predicting patterns of commerce and production based on the factor endowments of a trading region. The model essentially says that countries will export products that utilize their abundant and cheap factor(s) of production and import products that utilize the countries' scarce factor(s).

The results of this work have been the formulation of certain named conclusions arising from the assumptions inherent in the model. These are known as:

- Heckscher–Ohlin theorem
- Rybczynski theorem
- Stolper–Samuelson theorem
- Factor-Price Equalization theorem

=== Leontief paradox (Wassily Leontief, 1954) ===
Wassily Leontief's paradox in economics is that the country with the world's highest capital-per worker has a lower capital:labour ratio in exports than in imports.

This econometric find was the result of Professor Wassily W. Leontief's attempt to test the Heckscher-Ohlin theory empirically. In 1954, Leontief found that the U.S. (the most capital-abundant country in the world by any criteria) exported labor-intensive commodities and imported capital-intensive commodities, in contradiction with Heckscher-Ohlin theory.

=== Linder hypothesis (Staffan Burenstam Linder, 1961) ===
The Linder hypothesis (demand-structure hypothesis) is a conjecture in economics about international trade patterns. The hypothesis is that the more similar are the demand structures of countries the more they will trade with one another. Further, international trade will still occur between two countries having identical preferences and factor endowments (relying on specialization to create a comparative advantage in the production of differentiated goods between the two nations).

=== Location theory ===
Location theory is concerned with the geographic location of economic activity; it has become an integral part of economic geography, regional science, and spatial economics. Location theory addresses the questions of what economic activities are located where and why. Location theory rests—like microeconomic theory generally—on the assumption that agents act in their own self-interest. Thus firms choose locations that maximize their profits and individuals choose locations, that maximize their utility.

=== Market imperfection theory (Stephen Hymer, 1976 & Charles P. Kindleberger, 1969 & Richard E. Caves, 1971) ===
In economics, a market failure is a situation wherein the allocation of production or use of goods and services by the free market is not efficient. Market failures can be viewed as scenarios where individuals' pursuit of pure self-interest leads to results that can be improved upon from the societal point of view. The first known use of the term by economists was in 1958, but the concept has been traced back to the Victorian philosopher Henry Sidgwick.

Market imperfection can be defined as anything that interferes with trade. This includes two dimensions of imperfections. First, imperfections cause a rational market participant to deviate from holding the market portfolio. Second, imperfections cause a rational market participant to deviate from his preferred risk level. Market imperfections generate costs which interfere with trades that rational individuals make (or would make in the absence of the imperfection).

The idea that multinational corporations (MNEs) owe their existence to market imperfections was first put forward by Stephen Hymer, Charles P. Kindleberger and Caves. The market imperfections they had in mind were, however, structural imperfections in markets for final products.

According to Hymer, market imperfections are structural, arising from structural deviations from perfect competition in the final product market due to exclusive and permanent control of proprietary technology, privileged access to inputs, scale economies, control of distribution systems, and product differentiation, but in their absence markets are perfectly efficient.

By contrast, the insight of transaction costs theories of the MNEs, simultaneously and independently developed in the 1970s by McManus (1972), Buckley and Casson (1976), Brown (1976) and Hennart (1977, 1982), is that market imperfections are inherent attributes of markets, and MNEs are institutions to bypass these imperfections. Markets experience natural imperfections, i.e. imperfections that are because the implicit neoclassical assumptions of perfect knowledge and perfect enforcement are not realized.

=== New Trade Theory ===
New Trade Theory (NTT) is the economic critique of international free trade from the perspective of increasing returns to scale and the network effect. Some economists have asked whether it might be effective for a nation to shelter infant industries until they had grown to a sufficient size large enough to compete internationally.

New Trade theorists challenge the assumption of diminishing returns to scale, and some argue that using protectionist measures to build up a huge industrial base in certain industries will then allow those sectors to dominate the world market (via a network effect).

=== Specific factors model ===
In this model, labour mobility between industries is possible while capital is immobile between industries in the short-run. Thus, this model can be interpreted as a 'short run' version of the Heckscher-Ohlin model.

== Traditional approaches ==
The Porter diamond

=== Diamond model (Michael Porter) ===
The diamond model is an economical model developed by Michael Porter in his book The Competitive Advantage of Nations, where he published his theory of why particular industries become competitive in particular locations.

The diamond model consists of six factors:

- Factor conditions
- Demand conditions
- Related and supporting industries
- Firm strategy, structure and rivalry
- Government
- Chance

The Porter thesis is that these factors interact with each other to create conditions where innovation and improved competitiveness occurs.

=== Diffusion of innovations (Rogers, 1962) ===
Diffusion of innovation is a theory of how, why, and at what rate new ideas and technology spread through cultures. Everett Rogers introduced it in his 1962 book, Diffusion of Innovations, writing that "Diffusion is the process by which an innovation is communicated through certain channels over time among the members of a social system."

=== Eclectic paradigm (John H. Dunning) ===
The eclectic paradigm is a theory in economics and is also known as the OLI-Model. It is a further development of the theory of internalization and published by John H. Dunning in 1993. The theory of internalization itself is based on the transaction cost theory. This theory says that transactions are made within an institution if the transaction costs on the free market are higher than the internal costs. This process is called internalization.

For Dunning, not only the structure of organization is important. He added three additional factors to the theory:

1. Ownership advantages (trademark, production technique, entrepreneurial skills, returns to scale)
2. Locational advantages (existence of raw materials, low wages, special taxes or tariffs)
3. Internalisation advantages (advantages by producing through a partnership arrangement such as licensing or a joint venture)

=== Foreign direct investment theory ===
Foreign direct investment (FDI) in its classic form is defined as a company from one country making a physical investment into building a factory in another country. It is the establishment of an enterprise by a foreigner. Its definition can be extended to include investments made to acquire lasting interest in enterprises operating outside of the economy of the investor. The FDI relationship consists of a parent enterprise and a foreign affiliate which together form a multinational corporation (MNC). In order to qualify as FDI the investment must afford the parent enterprise control over its foreign affiliate. The International Monetary Fund (IMF) defines control in this case as owning 10% or more of the ordinary shares or voting power of an incorporated firm or its equivalent for an unincorporated firm; lower ownership shares are known as portfolio investment.

=== Monopolistic advantage theory (Stephen Hymer) ===
The monopolistic advantage theory is an approach in international business which explains why firms can compete in foreign settings against indigenous competitors and is frequently associated with the seminal contribution of Stephen Hymer.

Prior to Stephen Hymer’s doctoral thesis, The International Operations of National Firms: A Study of foreign direct Investment, theories did not adequately explain why firms engaged in foreign operations. Hymer started his research by analyzing the motivations behind foreign investment of US corporations in other countries. Neoclassical theories, dominant at the time, explained foreign direct investments as capital movements across borders based on perceived benefits from interest rates in other markets, there was no need to separate them from any other kind of investment. (Ietto-Guilles, 2012)

He effectively differentiated Foreign Direct Investment and portfolio investments by including the notion of control of foreign firms to FDI Theory, which implies control of the operation; whilst portfolio foreign investment confers a share of ownership but not control. Stephen Hymer focused on and considered FDI and MNE as part of the theory of the firm. (Hymer, 1976: 21)

He also dismissed the assumption that FDIs are motivated by the search of low costs in foreign countries, by emphasizing the fact that local firms are not able to compete effectively against foreign firms, even though they have to face foreign barriers (cultural, political, lingual etc.) to market entry. He suggested that firms invest in foreign countries in order to maximize their specific firm advantages in imperfect markets, that is, markets where the flow of information is uneven and allows companies to benefit from a competitive advantage over the local competition.

Stephen Hymer also suggested a second determinant for firms engaging in foreign operations, removal of conflicts. When a rival company is operating in a foreign market or is willing to enter one, a conflict situation arises. Through FDI, a multinational can share or take complete control of foreign production, effectively removing conflict. This will lead to the increase of market power for the specific firm, increasing imperfections in the market as a whole. (Ietto-Guilles, 2012)

A final determinant for multinationals making direct investments is the distribution of risk through diversification. By choosing different markets and production locations, the risk inherent to foreign operations are spread and reduced.

All of these motivations for FDI are built on market imperfections and conflict. A firm engaging in direct investment could then reduce competition, eliminate the conflicts and exploit the firm specific advantages making them capable of succeeding in a foreign market.

Stephen Hymer can be considered the father of international business because he effectively studied multinationals from a different perspective than the existing literature, by approaching multinationals as national companies with international operations, regarded as expansions from home operations. He analyzed the activities of the MNEs and their impact on the economy, gave an explanation for the large flow of foreign investments by US corporations at a time where they were incomplete, and envisioned the ethical conflicts that could arise from the increase in power of MNEs.

=== Non-availability approach (Irving B. Kravis, 1956) ===
The non-availability explains international trade by the fact that each country imports the goods that are not available at home. This unavailability may be due to lack of natural resources (oil, gold, etc.: this is absolute unavailability) or to the fact that the goods cannot be produced domestically, or could only be produced at prohibitive costs (for technological or other reasons): this is relative unavailability. On the other hand, each country exports the goods that are available at home.

=== Technology gap theory of trade (Michael Posner) ===
The technology gap theory describes an advantage enjoyed by the country that introduces new goods in a market. As a consequence of research activity and entrepreneurship, new goods are produced and the innovating country enjoys a monopoly until the other countries learn to produce these goods: in the meantime they have to import them. Thus, international trade is created for the time necessary to imitate the new goods (imitation lag).

=== Uppsala model ===
The Uppsala model is a theory that explains how firms gradually intensify their activities in foreign markets. It is similar to the POM model. The key features of both models are the following: firms first gain experience from the domestic market before they move to foreign markets; firms start their foreign operations from culturally and/or geographically close countries and move gradually to culturally and geographically more distant countries; firms start their foreign operations by using traditional exports and gradually move to using more intensive and demanding operation modes (sales subsidiaries etc.) both at the company and target country level.

=== Updated Uppsala model ===
The Updated Uppsala model is a further progression of the original Uppsala model. Like the Uppsala model, the Updated Uppsala model is a theory that explains firm internationalization as a process of gradual commitment. However, instead of an increased commitment to other markets, the theory posits that firms commit to business networks. Firms thereby utilize the established relationships with other firms to internationalize within their network, e.g. by localizing production at a foreign production site of the client.

=== Learning portal model ===
The Learning portal model is a new theory that was originally developed to explain the emergence and catch-up of multinational firms from the emerging markets. The theory explains that latecomer firms (from both, advanced and emerging markets) can use springboarding strategies to leapfrog certain technological development stages and accelerate their catch‐up with incumbent leading firms in their industry. To do so, the catching-up firms establish learning portals in knowledge hubs to acquire knowledge and assets, which they exploit to compete in global markets.

== Further theories ==
=== Contingency theory ===
Contingency theory refers to any of a number of management theories. Several contingency approaches were developed concurrently in the late 1960s. They suggested that previous theories such as Weber's bureaucracy and Frederick Winslow Taylor's scientific management had failed because they neglected that management style and organizational structure were influenced by various aspects of the environment: the contingency factors. There could not be "one best way" for leadership or organization.

=== Contract theory ===
In economics, contract theory studies how economic actors can and do construct contractual arrangements, generally in the presence of asymmetric information. Contract theory is closely connected to the field of law and economics. One prominent field of application is managerial compensation.

=== Economy of scale ===
Economies of scale, in microeconomics, are the cost advantages that a business obtains due to expansion. They are factors that cause a producer’s average cost per unit to fall as output rises. Diseconomies of scale are the opposite. Economies of scale may be utilized by any size firm expanding its scale of operation.

=== Product life-cycle theory ===
As first articulated by Raymond Vernon in 1966, a product goes through a life cycle consisting of four stages: "new product," "growth product," "maturity product," and "obsolescence product." The conditions in which a product is sold change over time and must be managed as it moves through this succession of stages. This is called product life cycle management.

=== Transaction cost theory ===
The theory of the firm consists of a number of economic theories which describe the nature of the firm, company, or corporation, including its existence, its behaviour, and its relationship with the market.

Ronald Coase set out his transaction cost theory of the firm in 1937, making it one of the first (neo-classical) attempts to define the firm theoretically in relation to the market. Coase sets out to define a firm in a manner which is both realistic and compatible with the idea of substitution at the margin, so instruments of conventional economic analysis apply. He notes that a firm’s interactions with the market may not be under its control (for instance because of sales taxes), but its internal allocation of resources are: “Within a firm ... market transactions are eliminated and in place of the complicated market structure with exchange transactions is substituted the entrepreneur ... who directs production.” He asks why alternative methods of production (such as the price mechanism and economic planning), could not either achieve all production, so that either firms use internal prices for all their production, or one big firm runs the entire economy. More recent work has added managerial cognition into the transaction cost theory framework to internationalization—for example, a 2025 study of Chinese SMEs found that top managers’ global mindset significantly influences their choice of export channel in conjunction with TCE considerations.

=== Theory of the growth of the firm (Edith Penrose, 1959) ===
While at Johns Hopkins, Penrose participated in a research project on the growth of firms. She came to the conclusion that the existing theory of the firm was inadequate to explain how firms grow. Her insight was to realise that the 'Firm' in theory is not the same thing as 'flesh and blood' organizations that businessmen call firms. This insight eventually led to the publication of her second book, The Theory of the Growth of the Firm in 1959.

== See also ==
- Division of labour
- Globalization
- International marketing
- International trade
- Internationalization and localization
- List of economic communities
- List of free trade agreements
- Mercantilism
- Cultural homogenization
