= International trade theory =

Subfield of economics focusing on trade between nations

International trade theory is a sub-field of economics which analyzes the patterns of international trade, its origins, and its welfare implications. International trade policy has been highly controversial since the 18th century. International trade theory and economics itself have developed as means to evaluate the effects of trade policies.

== Adam Smith's model ==
Adam Smith describes trade taking place as a result of countries having absolute advantage in production of particular goods, relative to each other. Within Adam Smith's framework, absolute advantage refers to the instance where one country can produce a unit of a good with less labor than another country.

In Book IV of his major work the Wealth of Nations, Adam Smith, discussing gains from trade, provides a literary model for absolute advantage based upon the example of growing grapes from Scotland. He makes the argument that while it is possible to grow grapes and produce wine in Scotland, the investment in the factors of production would cost thirty times more than the cost of purchasing an equal quantity from a foreign country. The minimization of aggregate real costs and efficient resource allocation through trade without strong consideration for comparative costs form the basis of Adam Smith's model of absolute advantage in international trade.

== Ricardian model ==
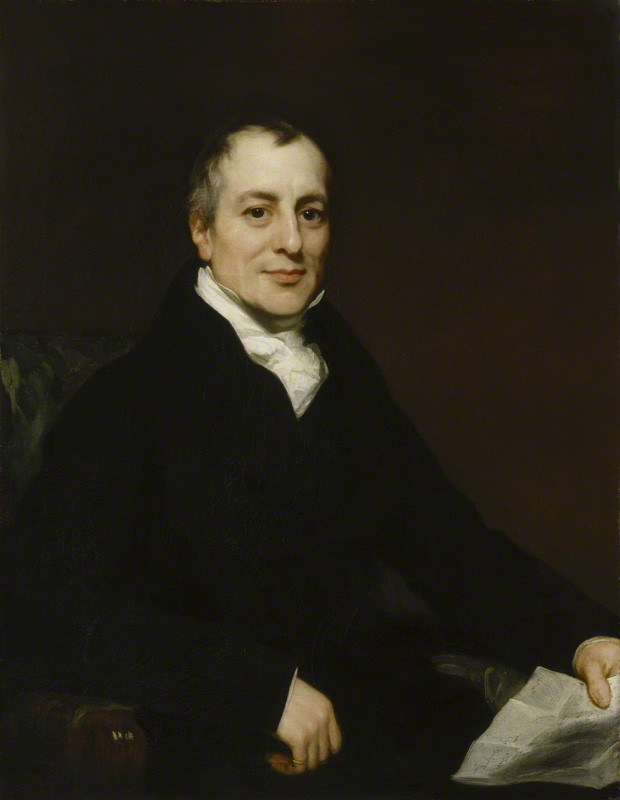
The law of comparative advantage was first proposed by David Ricardo.

The Ricardian theory of comparative advantage became a basic constituent of neoclassical trade theory. Any undergraduate course in trade theory includes a presentation of Ricardo's example of a two-commodity, two-country model. For the modern development, see Ricardian trade theory extensions

The Ricardian model focuses on comparative advantage, which arises due to differences in technology or natural resources. The Ricardian model does not directly consider factor endowments, such as the relative amounts of labor and capital within a country.

=== New interpretation ===
The Ricardian model is often presented as being based on the following assumptions:

- Labor is the only primary input to production.
- The relative ratios of labor at which the production of one good can be traded off for another, differ between countries.

This is incomplete, because the Ricardian model can be extended to the situation where many goods can be inputs for a production. See Ricardian trade theory extensions below. Relative ratio of labor input coefficients has a valid meaning only for simple cases such as two-country, many commodity case or many-country, two-commodity case without no intermediate goods.

As for the meanings of four magic numbers, a new interpretation became popular in the 21st century. In 2002, Roy Ruffin pointed the possibility of new reading of Ricardo's explanations. Andrea Maneschi made a detailed account in 2004. Now the new interpretation has become almost as established as Ricardo's text, not only for the first third of Chapter 7 but for all descriptions throughout his book concerning international trade.

== Specific factors model ==
The specific factors model is an extension of the Ricardian model. It was due to Jacob Viner's interest in explaining the migration of workers from the rural to urban areas after the Industrial revolution.

In this model labor mobility among industries is possible while capital is assumed to be immobile in the short run. Thus, this model can be interpreted as a short-run version of the Heckscher-Ohlin model. The "specific factors" name refers to the assumption that in the short run, specific factors of production such as physical capital are not easily transferable between industries. The theory suggests that if there is an increase in the price of a good, the owners of the factor of production specific to that good will profit in real terms.

== Heckscher–Ohlin model ==
In the early 1900s, a theory of international trade was developed by two Swedish economists, Eli Heckscher and Bertil Ohlin. This theory has subsequently become known as the Heckscher–Ohlin model (H–O model). The results of the H–O model are that the pattern of international trade is determined by differences in factor endowments. It predicts that countries will export those goods that make intensive use of locally abundant factors and will import goods that make intensive use of factors that are locally scarce.

The H–O model makes the following core assumptions:

- Labor and capital flow freely between sectors equalising factor prices across sectors within a country.
- The amount of labor and capital in two countries differ (difference in endowments)
- Technology is the same among countries (a long-term assumption)
- Tastes are the same upon countries

=== Stolper-Samuelson theorem ===
According to the Stolper-Samuelson theorem, the export of a product which is a relatively cheap, abundant resource makes this resource more scarce in the domestic market. Thus, the increased demand for the abundant resource leads to an increase in its price and an increase in its income. Simultaneously, the income of the resource used intensively in the import-competing product decreases as its demand falls.

Simply put, this theorem indicates that an increase in the price of a product rises the income earned by resources that are used intensively in its production. Conversely, a decrease in the price of a product reduces the income of the resources that it uses intensively. The abundant resource that have comparative advantage realizes an increase in income, and the scarce resource realizes a decrease in its income regardless of industry. This trade theory concludes that some people will suffer losses from free trade even in the long-term.

Later generalized by economist Ronald Jones, the Magnification Effect describes how, when countries engage in free trade, the real return of a country's relatively abundant factor increases, while the return on its relatively scarce factor decreases. In a capital-abundant country, capital owners are likely to see increased purchasing power, while workers may experience a decline in wages and living standards. The effect is reversed in labor-abundant countries. As trade liberalization causes prices to shift—typically lowering import prices and increasing export demand—resources move toward export-driven industries. This shift intensifies demand for the abundant factor (e.g., capital), increasing its return, while oversupplying the scarce factor (e.g., labor), which leads to lower real wages, reduced purchasing power for workers, and long-term inequality between factor groups.

=== Empirical Evidence for the Heckscher–Ohlin model ===
In 1953, Wassily Leontief published a study in which he tested the validity of the Heckscher-Ohlin theory. The study showed that the United States was more abundant in capital compared to other countries, therefore the United States would export capital-intensive goods and import labor-intensive goods. Leontief found out that the United States' exports were less capital intensive than its imports. The result became known as Leontief's paradox.

After the appearance of Leontief's paradox, many researchers tried to save the Heckscher-Ohlin theory, either by new methods of measurement, or by new interpretations.

== New trade theory ==
New trade theory tries to explain empirical elements of trade that comparative advantage-based models above have difficulty with. These include the fact that most trade is between countries with similar factor endowment and productivity levels, and the large amount of multinational production (i.e., foreign direct investment) that exists. New trade theories are often based on assumptions such as monopolistic competition and increasing returns to scale. One result of these theories is the home-market effect, which asserts that, if an industry tends to cluster in one location because of returns to scale and if that industry faces high transportation costs, the industry will be located in the country with most of its demand, in order to minimize cost.

== "New" new trade theory ==
New trade theory is a theory of international trade inaugurated by Marc Melitz in 2003. It discovered that efficiency of firms in a country changes much and those firms engaged in international trade have higher productivity than firms which produce only for domestic market. As it is fitted to big data age, the research produced many follows and the trend is now called New new trade theory in comparison to Paul Krugman's new trade theory.

== Gravity model ==
The Gravity model of trade presents a more empirical analysis of trading patterns. The gravity model, in its basic form, predicts trade based on the distance between countries and the interaction of the countries' economic sizes. The model mimics the Newtonian law of gravity which also considers distance and physical size between two objects. The model has been shown to have significant empirical validity.

== Ricardian trade theory extensions ==
According to Eaton and Kortum, in the 21 century, "the Ricardian framework has experienced a revival. Much work in international trade during the last decade has returned to the assumption that countries gain from trade because they have access to different technologies. ... This line of thought has brought Ricardo's theory of comparative advantage back to center stage." The Ricardian trade theory was expanded and generalized multiple times: notably to treat many-country many-product situations and to include intermediate input trade, and choice of production techniques. In Ricardian framework, capital goods (comprising fixed capital) are treated as goods which are produced and consumed in the production.

Another attempt to restore comparative advantage to the center of the stage is the "basic laws of trade". Comparative advantage is the first law in the basic laws of trade. At the international level, the basic laws require real exchange rates for tradables only (RER-T). The basic laws state that if the actual exchange rate is the same as the RER-T, then trade between countries tends to be relatively balanced and gains of trade are optimal for all participating countries.

=== Many countries, many goods ===
There were three waves of expansions and generalizations.

First phase: Major general results were obtained by McKenzie and Jones. McKenzie was more interested in the patterns of trade specialisiations (including incomplete specializations), whereas Jones was more interested in the patterns of complete specialization, in which the prices moves freely within a certain limited range. The formula he found is often cited as Jones' inequality or Jones' criterion.

Second phase: Ricardo's idea was even expanded to the case of continuum of goods by Dornbusch, Fischer, and Samuelson (1977). This model is restricted to the two country case. It is employed for example by Matsuyama and others. These theories use a special property that is applicable only for the two-country case. They normally assume fixed expenditure coefficients. Eaton and Kortum (2002) inherited Ricardian model with a continuum of goods from Dorbusch, Fischer, and Samuelson (1977). It has succeeded to incorporate trade of intermediate products. Countries have different access to technology. The bundle of inputs is assumed as the same across commodities within a country. This means that all industries of a country consume the same bundle of inputs and there is no distinction between petrol-consuming and iron-consuming industries. This is the major reason why Eaton and Kortum (2002) cannot be used as framework for analyzing global value chains. The paper has gotten a big success as giving theoretical foundation for gravity model.

Third phase: Shiozawa succeeded to construct a Ricardian theory with many-country, many-commodity model which permits choice of production techniques and trade of input goods. All countries have their own set of production techniques. The major difference with the Heckscher-Ohlin (H-O) model is that the Ricardian model assumes different technologies. Wages determined in this model are different according to the productivity of countries. The model is therefore more suitable than H-O models in analyzing relations between developing and developed countries. Shiozawa's theory is now extended as "the new theory of international values."

=== Traded intermediate goods ===
Ricardian trade theory ordinarily assumes that the labor is the unique input. This has been thought to be a significant deficiency for Ricardian trade theory since intermediate goods comprise a major part of world international trade.

McKenzie and Jones emphasized the necessity to expand the Ricardian theory to the cases of traded inputs. McKenzie (1954, p. 179) pointed that "A moment's consideration will convince one that Lancashire would be unlikely to produce cotton cloth if the cotton had to be grown in England." Paul Samuelson coined a term Sraffa bonus to name the gains from trade of inputs.

John S. Chipman observed in his survey that McKenzie stumbled upon the questions of intermediate products and postulated that "introduction of trade in intermediate product necessitates a fundamental alteration in classical analysis". It took many years until Shiozawa succeeded in removing this deficiency. The new theory of international values is now the unique theory that can deal with input trade in a general form.

Based on an idea of Takahiro Fujimoto, who is a specialist in automobile industry and a philosopher of the international competitiveness, Fujimoto and Shiozawa developed a discussion in which how the factories of the same multi-national firms compete between them across borders. International intra-firm competition reflects a really new aspect of international competition in the age of so-called global competition.

=== Global value chains ===
Revolutionary change in communication and information techniques and drastic downs of transport costs have enabled an historic breakup of production process. Networks of fragmented productions across countries are now called global value chains. The emergence of global production has changed the way we understand the trade and international economy. Still the core of international trade theory continues to be dominated by theories which assume trade of complete goods. As Grossman and Rossi-Hansberg put it, it needs a new paradigm to better understand the implication of these trends. Extended Ricardian trade model provides a new theory that can treat trade of input goods and the emergence of global value chains. Based on the new theory of trade, which he names theory of international values, Shiozawa explained why and how global value chains rapidly spread all over the world at the end of the 20th century.

=== Unemployment in international trade situations ===
Unemployment is closely related to international trade. Four generations of trade theories assumed full employment as one of initial conditions and could not treat unemployment. Shiozawa, based on his discovery of a new definition of regular international value, succeeded to construct a new theory that permits unemployment.

== Effects on democracy ==
International trade can increase economic inequality in a country while strengthening democratic and rule of law institutions in underdeveloped democracies. International trade between democracies can prevent democratic backsliding and international trade between democracies and autocracies can stabilize autocracies. International organizations can apply democracy promotion to international trade agreements.

== See also ==
- Economic liberalization
- Great Trade Collapse
- Fair trade
- Triangular trade
- Canton System
- Preferential trading area
- Trade justice
