= Jeffrey H. Bergstrand =

American economist

Academic background
- Education: Northwestern University (BA); University of Wisconsin–Madison (MA, PhD)

Academic work
- Discipline: International economics
- Institutions: University of Notre Dame
- Awards: Bhagwati Award (Journal of International Economics, 2003)

Jeffrey H. Bergstrand is an American economist. He is professor emeritus of finance at the University of Notre Dame. He previously worked as an economist at the Federal Reserve Bank of Boston. His research has addressed international trade, in particular the gravity model of trade, the measured effects of free trade agreements, and the knowledge-and-physical-capital model of multinational firms, foreign direct investment, and foreign affiliate sales.

In 1985 and 1989 he published general-equilibrium derivations of the gravity equation in The Review of Economics and Statistics. With Scott Baier he later estimated the ex post effects of free trade agreements on members' trade. A 2016 United States International Trade Commission review called their 2007 Journal of International Economics paper "the most seminal paper in the recent period" on average agreement effects.

In a 2007 Journal of International Economics paper, he and Peter Egger developed a general-equilibrium model of bilateral trade flows, foreign direct investment, and foreign affiliate sales. It addressed a puzzle in the knowledge-capital model in which a pair of similarly sized countries with large bilateral foreign direct investment would have zero bilateral trade.

== Education and career ==
He received a B.A. in economics and political science from Northwestern University in 1974 and an M.A. (1979) and Ph.D. (1981) in economics from the University of Wisconsin–Madison.

He was an economist at the Federal Reserve Bank of Boston from 1981 to 1986 and joined the Notre Dame faculty in 1986. He retired in 2024 as professor emeritus of finance, concurrent professor emeritus of economics, and concurrent professor emeritus of global affairs. He was co-editor of the Review of International Economics from 1996 to 2003.

== Research ==
=== Gravity equation ===
The 1985 paper derives a gravity equation from a general-equilibrium model with nationally differentiated products and argues that the usual log-linear specification leaves out price terms when goods are not perfect substitutes. The 1989 paper puts the same apparatus in a two-factor, two-industry setting so that it can accommodate both Heckscher–Ohlin trade and monopolistic competition models of intra-industry trade.

Anderson and van Wincoop (2003) cite Bergstrand (1985, 1989) for the multilateral resistance term, then distinguish their own contribution as a workable cross-section treatment of bilateral barriers.

In 2018 the Review of Economics and Statistics printed a list of its most-cited papers from 1919 to 2017. Notre Dame reported that the 1985 article stood eighth on that list and first among papers of the 1980s.

=== Free trade agreements ===
Baier and Bergstrand (2007) treat membership in a free trade agreement as endogenous. Cross-section gravity estimates of the trade effect are, on their account, biased by that selection. With pair-fixed-effects panels they estimate that an agreement roughly doubles members' bilateral trade after about ten years.

The Commission's 2016 report on U.S. agreements implemented under trade-promotion authority called that paper "the most seminal paper in the recent period" on average agreement effects. It restated the contrast the authors drew: about 14 percent in a conventional gravity specification, about 98 percent with pair fixed effects, and 114 percent once phase-in is allowed. Peter Herman's 2023 Commission staff paper, Gravity Estimation: Best Practices and Useful Approaches, returns to the same 2007 article for the argument that agreements are not formed at random and that pair fixed effects are the practical response to the resulting omitted-variable bias.

In an earlier joint paper, "Economic Determinants of Free Trade Agreements" (2004), the authors provided a general-equilibrium model of the endogenous selection of country pairs into free trade agreements on the basis of economic characteristics, with empirical estimates of the probability that a pair forms an agreement.

An even earlier joint paper, "The Growth of World Trade: Tariffs, Transport Costs, and Income Similarity" (2001), split postwar OECD trade growth among income growth, tariff cuts, transport costs, and income convergence. The Journal of International Economics gave it the Bhagwati Award for 2001-2002.

=== Multinational firms and foreign direct investment ===
In a 2007 article, Bergstrand and Peter Egger extended the knowledge-capital model of multinational firms associated with James Markusen by adding physical capital and a third country. The authors argued that the extension gave general-equilibrium foundations for gravity equations of trade, foreign direct investment, and foreign affiliate sales, and removed the earlier model's prediction that two identical countries with large bilateral investment would have no intra-industry trade in the good. In a 2013 paper they applied the framework to why country pairs sign bilateral investment treaties.

The United States International Trade Commission's Multinational Revenue, Employment, and Investment Database, released in 2023, was developed by Commission staff in conjunction with Bergstrand and Jordi Paniagua.

== Selected publications ==
- Bergstrand, Jeffrey H. (1985). "The Gravity Equation in International Trade: Some Microeconomic Foundations and Empirical Evidence". The Review of Economics and Statistics. 67 (3): 474–481. doi:10.2307/1925976. JSTOR 1925976.
- Bergstrand, Jeffrey H. (1989). "The Generalized Gravity Equation, Monopolistic Competition, and the Factor-Proportions Theory in International Trade". The Review of Economics and Statistics. 71 (1): 143–153. doi:10.2307/1928061. JSTOR 1928061.
- Baier, Scott L.; Bergstrand, Jeffrey H. (2001). "The Growth of World Trade: Tariffs, Transport Costs, and Income Similarity". Journal of International Economics. 53 (1): 1–27. doi:10.1016/S0022-1996(00)00060-X.
- Baier, Scott L.; Bergstrand, Jeffrey H. (2004). "Economic determinants of free trade agreements". Journal of International Economics. 64 (1): 29–63. doi:10.1016/S0022-1996(03)00079-5.
- Baier, Scott L.; Bergstrand, Jeffrey H. (2007). "Do Free Trade Agreements Actually Increase Members' International Trade?". Journal of International Economics. 71 (1): 72–95. doi:10.1016/j.jinteco.2006.02.005. hdl:10419/101013.
- Bergstrand, Jeffrey H.; Egger, Peter (2007). "A knowledge-and-physical-capital model of international trade flows, foreign direct investment, and multinational enterprises". Journal of International Economics. 73 (2): 278–308. doi:10.1016/j.jinteco.2007.03.004.
- Bergstrand, Jeffrey H.; Egger, Peter (2013). "What determines BITs?". Journal of International Economics. 90 (1): 107–122. doi:10.1016/j.jinteco.2012.11.004.
