= Gravity model of trade =

Bilateral trade flow model

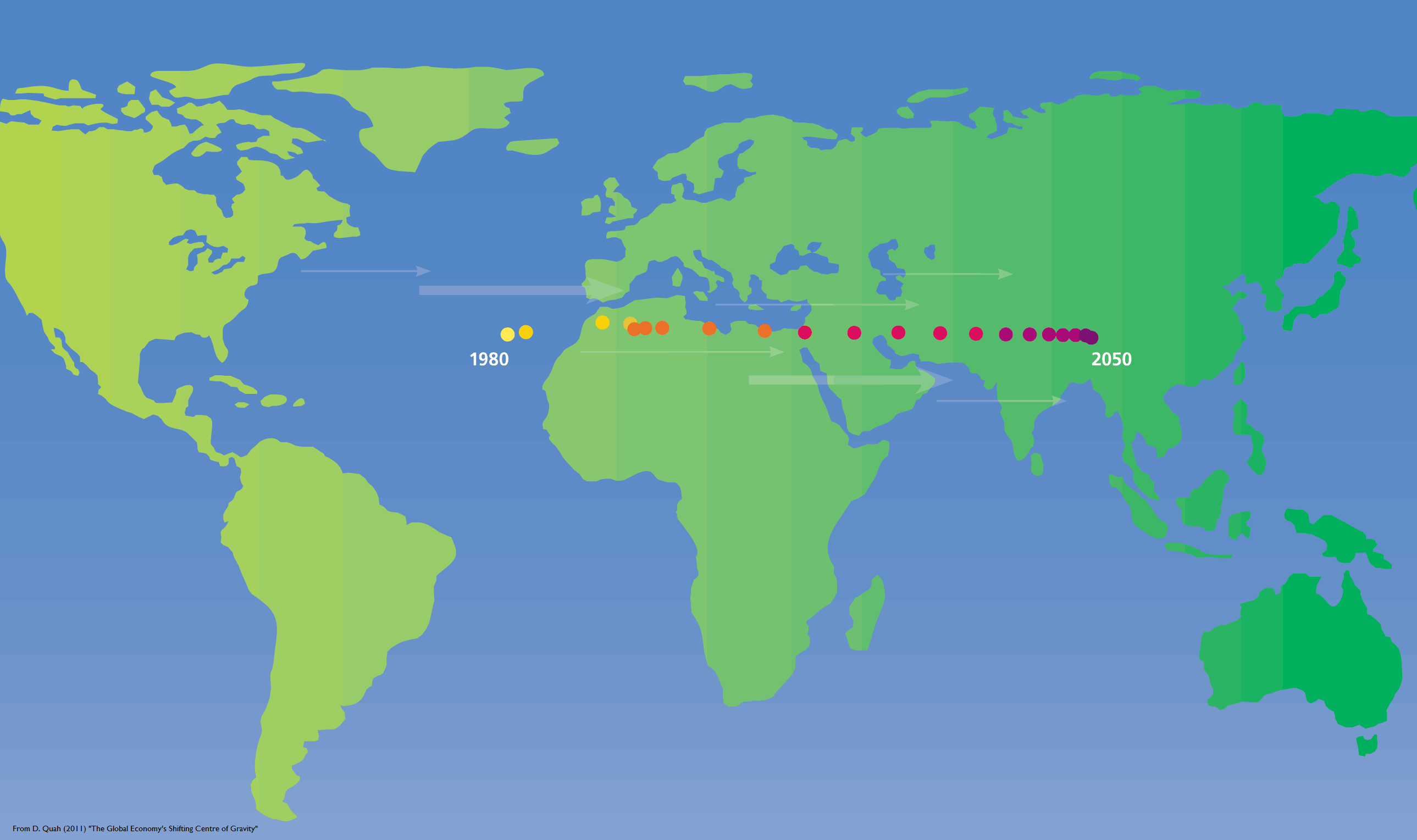
Shift of the world's economic center of gravity since 1980 and projected until 2050

The gravity model of trade in international economics is a model that, in its traditional form, predicts bilateral trade flows based on the economic sizes and distance between two units. Research shows that there is "overwhelming evidence that trade tends to fall with distance."

The model was first introduced by Walter Isard in 1954, who elaborated the concept of "income potential" within the framework of international economics, building upon John Quincy Stewart's earlier idea of demographic gravitation, which had been introduced in 1941. Similarly, Stewart's work on population potential from 1947 had a significant impact on Chauncy Harris, who, in 1954, proposed the economic concept of market potential.

The basic model for trade between two countries (i and j) takes the form of

$$F_{ij} = G \cdot \frac{M_i M_j}{D_{ij}}.$$

In this formula G is a constant, F stands for trade flow, D stands for the distance and M stands for the economic dimensions of the countries that are being measured. The equation can be changed into a linear form for the purpose of econometric analyses by employing logarithms. The model has been used by economists to analyse the determinants of bilateral trade flows such as common borders, common languages, common legal systems, common currencies, common colonial legacies, and it has been used to test the effectiveness of trade agreements and organizations such as the North American Free Trade Agreement (NAFTA) and the World Trade Organization (WTO) (Head and Mayer 2014). The model has also been used in international relations to evaluate the impact of treaties and alliances on trade (Head and Mayer).

The model has also been applied to other bilateral flow data (also known as "dyadic" data) such as migration, traffic, remittances and foreign direct investment.

== Theoretical justifications and research ==
The model has been an empirical success in that it accurately predicts trade flows between countries for many goods and services, but for a long time some scholars believed that there was no theoretical justification for the gravity equation. However, a gravity relationship can arise in almost any trade model that includes trade costs that increase with distance.

The gravity model estimates the pattern of international trade. While the model's basic form consists of factors that have more to do with geography and spatiality, the gravity model has been used to test hypotheses rooted in purer economic theories of trade as well. One such theory predicts that trade will be based on relative factor abundances. One of the common relative factor abundance models is the Heckscher–Ohlin model. Those countries with a relative abundance of one factor would be expected to produce goods that require a relatively large amount of that factor in their production. While a generally accepted theory of trade, many economists in the Chicago School believed that the Heckscher–Ohlin model alone was sufficient to describe all trade, while Bertil Ohlin himself argued that in fact the world is more complicated. Investigations into real-world trading patterns have produced a number of results that do not match the expectations of comparative advantage theories. Notably, a study by Wassily Leontief found that the United States, the most capital-endowed country in the world, actually exports more in labor-intensive industries. Comparative advantage in factor endowments would suggest the opposite would occur. Other theories of trade and explanations for this relationship were proposed in order to explain the discrepancy between Leontief's empirical findings and economic theory. The problem has become known as the Leontief paradox.

An alternative theory, first proposed by Staffan Linder, predicts that patterns of trade will be determined by the aggregated preferences for goods within countries. Those countries with similar preferences would be expected to develop similar industries. With continued similar demand, these countries would continue to trade back and forth in differentiated but similar goods since both demand and produce similar products. For instance, both Germany and the United States are industrialized countries with a high preference for automobiles. Both countries have automobile industries, and both trade cars. The empirical validity of the Linder hypothesis is somewhat unclear. Several studies have found a significant impact of the Linder effect, but others have had weaker results. Studies that do not support Linder have only counted countries that actually trade; they do not input zero values for the dyads where trade could happen but does not. This has been cited as a possible explanation for their findings. Also, Linder never presented a formal model for his theory, so different studies have tested his hypothesis in different ways.

Elhanan Helpman and Paul Krugman asserted that the theory behind comparative advantage does not predict the relationships in the gravity model. Using the gravity model, countries with similar levels of income have been shown to trade more. Helpman and Krugman see this as evidence that these countries are trading in differentiated goods because of their similarities. This casts some doubt about the impact Heckscher–Ohlin has on the real world. Jeffrey Frankel sees the Helpman–Krugman setup here as distinct from Linder's proposal. However, he does say Helpman–Krugman is different from the usual interpretation of Linder, but, since Linder made no clear model, the association between the two should not be completely discounted. Alan Deardorff adds the possibility, that, while not immediately apparent, the basic gravity model can be derived from Heckscher–Ohlin as well as the Linder and Helpman–Krugman hypotheses. Deardorff concludes that, considering how many models can be tied to the gravity model equation, it is not useful for evaluating the empirical validity of theories.

Bridging economic theory with empirical tests, James Anderson and Jeffrey H. Bergstrand develop econometric models, grounded in the theories of differentiated goods, which measure the gains from trade liberalizations and the magnitude of the border barriers on trade (see Home bias in trade puzzle). A recent synthesis of empirical research using the gravity equations, however, shows that the effect of border barriers on trade is relatively modest.

Adding to the problem of bridging economic theory with empirical results, some economists have pointed to the possibility of intra-industry trade not as the result of differentiated goods, but because of "reciprocal dumping". In these models, the countries involved are said to have imperfect competition and segmented markets in homogeneous goods, which leads to intra-industry trade as firms in imperfect competition seek to expand their markets to other countries and trade goods that are not differentiated yet for which they do not have a comparative advantage, since there is no specialization. This model of trade is consistent with the gravity model as it would predict that trade depends on country size.

The reciprocal dumping model has held up to some empirical testing, suggesting that the specialization and differentiated goods models for the gravity equation might not fully explain the gravity equation. Feenstra, Markusen, and Rose (2001) provided evidence for reciprocal dumping by assessing the home market effect in separate gravity equations for differentiated and homogeneous goods. The home market effect showed a relationship in the gravity estimation for differentiated goods, but showed the inverse relationship for homogeneous goods. The authors show that this result matches the theoretical predictions of reciprocal dumping playing a role in homogeneous markets.

Past research using the gravity model has also sought to evaluate the impact of various variables in addition to the basic gravity equation. Among these, price level and exchange rate variables have been shown to have a relationship in the gravity model that accounts for a significant amount of the variance not explained by the basic gravity equation. According to empirical results on price level, the effect of price level varies according to the relationship being examined. For instance, if exports are being examined, a relatively high price level on the part of the importer would be expected to increase trade with that country. A non-linear system of equations are used by Anderson and van Wincoop (2003) to account for the endogenous change in these price terms from trade liberalization. A more simple method is to use a first order log-linearization of this system of equations (Baier and Bergstrand (2009)), or exporter-country-year and importer-country-year dummy variables. For counterfactual analysis, however, one would still need to account for the change in world prices.

== Econometric estimation of gravity equations ==
Since the gravity model for trade does not hold exactly, in econometric applications it is customary to specify

$$F_{ij} = G \frac{ M_i^{\beta_1} M_j^{\beta_2} }{ D_{ij}^{\beta_3}} \eta_{ij}$$

where $F_{ij}$ represents volume of trade from country $i$ to country $j$, $M_i$ and $M_j$ typically represent the GDPs for countries $i$ and $j$, $D_{ij}$ denotes the distance between the two countries, and $\eta$ represents an error term with expectation equal to 1.

The traditional approach to estimating this equation consists in taking logs of both sides, leading to a log-log model of the form (note: constant G becomes part of $\beta_0$):

$$\ln (F_{ij}) = \beta_0 + \beta_1 \ln (M_i) + \beta_2 \ln (M_j) - \beta_3 \ln (D_{ij}) + \varepsilon_{ij}.$$

However, this approach has two major problems. First, it obviously cannot be used when there are observations for which $F_{ij}$ is equal to zero. Second, Santos Silva and Tenreyro (2006) argued that estimating the log-linearized equation by least squares (OLS) can lead to significant biases if the researcher believes the true model to be nonlinear in its parameters. As an alternative, these authors have suggested that the model should be estimated in its multiplicative form, i.e.,

$$F_{ij} = \exp [ \beta_0 + \beta_1 \ln (M_i) + \beta_2 \ln (M_j) - \beta_3 \ln (D_{ij})] \eta_{ij},$$

using a Poisson pseudo-maximum likelihood (PPML) estimator based on the Poisson regression model usually used for count data. As shown by Santos Silva and Tenreyro (2006), PPML estimates of common gravity variables can be different from their OLS counterparts. In particular, they found that the trade-reducing effects of distance were smaller and that the effects of colonial ties were statistically insignificant.

Though PPML does allow the inclusion of observations where $F_{ij}=0$, it is not necessarily a perfect solution to the "zeroes" problem. Martin and Pham (2008) argued that using PPML on gravity severely biases estimates when zero trade flows are frequent and reflect non-random selection. However, their results were challenged by Santos Silva and Tenreyro (2011), who argued that the simulation results of Martin and Pham (2008) are based on misspecified models and showed that the PPML estimator performs well even when the proportions of zeros is very large. The latter argument assumes that the number of trading firms can be generated via a count data model, with zero trade flows in the data reflecting the probability that no firms engage in trade. This idea was formalized further by Eaton, Kortum, and Sotelo (2012), who advocated for using the bilateral expenditure share as the dependent variable in place of the level of bilateral trade flows.

In applied work, the gravity model is often extended by including variables to account for language relationships, tariffs, contiguity, access to sea, colonial history, and exchange rate regimes. Yet the estimation of structural gravity, based on Anderson and van Wincoop (2003), requires the inclusion of importer and exporter fixed effects, thus limiting the gravity analysis to bilateral trade costs (Baldwin and Taglioni 2007). Aside from OLS and PPML, other methods for gravity estimation include Gamma pseudo-maximum likelihood and the "tetrads" method of Head, Mayer, and Ries (2010). The latter involves first transforming the dependent variable in order to cancel out any country-specific factors. This provides another way of focusing only on bilateral trade costs.

== See also ==
- Gravity model of migration
- Internationalization
- Radiation law for human mobility
