= Ricardo–Viner model =

Economic model in international trade theory

The Ricardo–Viner model, also known as the specific factors model, is an extension of the Ricardo model used in international trade theory. It was due to Jacob Viner's interest in explaining the migration of workers from the rural to urban areas after the Industrial Revolution. Unlike the Ricardian model, the specific factors model allows for the existence of factors of production besides labor. In other words, labor is mobile, while the two other factors of production are immobile (sector specific) as opposed to the Ricardian model where labor is immobile internationally, but mobile between two sectors of an economy.

== Assumptions of the model ==
The economy in this model consists of two countries, two goods and three factors of production. The two countries can only trade goods, not factors of production.

Here only the mobile production factor (labor) can be used in the production of both goods and can therefore move between sectors. In the use of labor, there will normally be diminishing returns to scale; holding all the other factors of production constant, an increase in labor will mean less of the other factor per worker and in turn each additional worker will add less production than the last. Additionally, the specific factors model demonstrates that trade generally benefits the factors of production specific to the export sector of a country while hurting the factor specific to the import-competing sector as the relative prices of the factors adjust to the country's budget constraint.

However, when the Ricardian–Viner model is treated as dynamic, the sector-specific factors of production can become mobile over time. Under these circumstances, the Ricardian–Viner model exhibits a Heckscher–Ohlin equilibrium in the long run similar to that of the Stolper–Samuelson theorem. In this sense, the model can be seen as a short-run version of the Heckscher–Ohlin model of comparative advantage.
