= Marginal intra-industry trade =

Marginal Intra-Industry Trade, a concept originating in international economics, refers to the degree to which the change in a country's exports over a certain period of time are essentially of the same products as its change in imports over the same period. The concept is therefore closely related to that of intra-industry trade, that being the export and import of the same items, but concerns changes in exports and imports between two points in time as opposed to their values at a given point in time. The concept is thought to be useful for ascertaining the amount of adjustment costs associated with changing trade flows or the degree to which changes in trade might be responsible for changes in the distribution of income. Several formulas have been proposed to quantify this concept but the most widely used is that of Shelburne (1993).

MIIT=1-(|ΔX-ΔM|/(|ΔX|+ |ΔM|))

where ΔX represents the change in exports between two points in time and ΔM represents the change in imports over the same period of time. The absolute values are needed because these changes in trade flows can sometimes be negative. Thus when exports and imports of a good change by the same amount the index would be one while if exports increase while imports do not (or vice versa) then the index would be zero. Generally adjustment costs or distribution effects are thought to be small if the MIIT index is high. The choice of the time period to use in making this calculation is somewhat arbitrary but can nevertheless significantly affect the results. The index is usually calculated as a sum of the different changes in imports and exports in the different sub-sectors (i). Thus more formally the index is:

MIIT=1-Σ_{i}(|ΔX_{i}-ΔM_{i}|)/(|ΔX_{i}|+ |ΔM|_{i})

Brülhart (1994) has further analyzed the properties of this index and popularized its use.
