= Linder hypothesis =

The Linder hypothesis is an economics conjecture about international trade patterns: The more similar the demand structures of countries, the more they will trade with one another. Further, international trade will still occur between two countries having identical preferences and factor endowments (relying on specialization to create a comparative advantage in the production of differentiated goods between the two nations).

== Development of the theory ==
The hypothesis was proposed by economist Staffan Burenstam Linder in 1961 as a possible resolution to the Leontief paradox, which questioned the empirical validity of the Heckscher–Ohlin theory (H–O). H–O predicts that patterns of international trade will be determined by the relative factor-endowments of different nations. Those with relatively high levels of capital in relation to labor would be expected to produce capital-intensive goods while those with an abundance of labor relative to (immobile) capital would be expected to produce labor-intensive goods. H-O and other theories of factor-endowment based trade had dominated the field of international economics until Leontief performed a study empirically rejecting H-O. In fact, Leontief found that the United States (then the most capital abundant nation) exported primarily labor-intensive goods. Linder proposed an alternative theory of trade that was consistent with Leontief's findings. The Linder hypothesis presents a demand based theory of trade in contrast to the usual supply based theories involving factor endowments. Linder hypothesized that nations with similar demands would develop similar industries. These nations would then trade with each other in similar, but differentiated goods.

== Empirical tests ==
Examinations of the Linder hypothesis have observed a "Linder effect" consistent with the hypothesis. Econometric tests of the hypothesis usually proxy the demand structure in a country from its per capita income: It is convenient to assume that the closer are the income levels per consumer the closer are the consumer preferences. (That is, the proportionate demand for each good becomes more similar, for example following Engel's law on food and non-food spending.) Econometric test of the hypothesis has been difficult because countries with similar levels of per capita income are generally located close to each other geographically, and distance is a very important factor in explaining the intensity of trade between two countries. Generally, a Linder effect has been found to be more significant for trade in manufactures than for non-manufactures, and within manufactures the effect is more significant for trade in capital goods than in consumer goods and more significant for differentiated products than for standardized products.

== See also ==
- Gravity model of trade
- Stockholm School of Economics
