= Rybczynski theorem =

International trade theorem

The Rybczynski theorem was developed in 1955 by the Polish-born English economist Tadeusz Rybczynski (1923–1998). It states that at constant relative goods prices, a rise in the endowment of one factor will lead to a more than proportional expansion of the output in the sector which uses that factor intensively, and an absolute decline of the output of the other good.

In the context of the Heckscher–Ohlin model of international trade, regions opened to trade often take the relative prices of goods as given. When there is a change in relative factor supply, the Rybczynski theorem explains the output changes and how factors are reallocated between the two sectors. In essence, both factors will move towards the sector that uses the factor that sees an increase in the relative supply more intensively, leading to a rise in output in this sector and an absolute decrease in output in the other sector.

Eventually, across both countries, market forces would return the system toward equality of production in regard to input prices such as wages (the state of factor price equalization).

== Relationship between endowments and outputs ==
The Rybczynski theorem displays how changes in an endowment affects the outputs of the goods when full employment is sustained. The theorem is useful in analyzing the effects of capital investment, immigration and emigration within the context of a Heckscher-Ohlin model. Consider the diagram below, depicting a labour constraint in red and a capital constraint in blue. Suppose production occurs initially on the production possibility frontier (PPF) at point A.

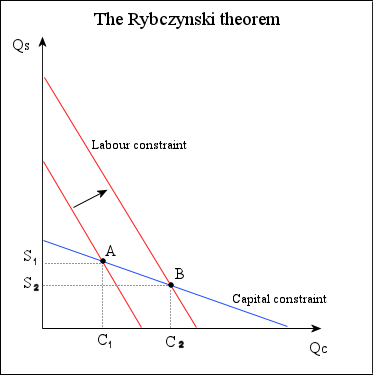

Suppose there is an increase in the labour endowment. This will cause an outward shift in the labour constraint. The PPF and thus production will shift to point B. Production of clothing, the labour-intensive good, will rise from C_{1} to C_{2}. Production of cars, the capital-intensive good, will fall from S_{1} to S_{2}.

If the endowment of capital rose the capital constraint would shift out causing an increase in car production and a decrease in clothing production. Since the labour constraint is steeper than the capital constraint, cars are capital-intensive and clothing is labor-intensive.

In general, an increase in a country's endowment of a factor will cause an increase in output of the good which uses that factor intensively, and a decrease in the output of the other good.

== See also ==
- Leontief paradox
- Dutch disease
