= Transfer problem =

Possibility that a debtor country might gain by making payments to its creditor countries

The transfer problem in international trade refers to the possibility that a debtor country might end up better off after making payments to its creditor countries. It was a subject of debate between John Maynard Keynes and Bertil Ohlin in the 1920s, regarding the issue of the ability of German reparation payment after World War I. In general terms, it refers to the effect of transfer of income on the donor's terms of trade. The reversal of capital flows force countries to go from a current account deficit to a current account surplus.

== See also ==
- Balance of trade
- Index of international trade articles
- Transfer pricing
