= Donald R. Davis (economist) =

American economist

Academic background
- Education: Columbia University (M.A., Ph.D.); University of California, Berkeley (B.A.)

Academic work
- Discipline: International trade, Urban economics
- Institutions: Columbia University
- Website: Information at IDEAS / RePEc

Donald R. Davis is an American economist. He is the Ragnar Nurkse Professor of Economics at Columbia University.

== Biography ==
Davis received his B.A. from the University of California, Berkeley and Ph.D. from Columbia University. He taught at Harvard University before joining Columbia's faculty in 1999 and was appointed chair of the economics department in 2001.

Davis' research focuses on testing international trade theories and his theoretical contributions include improving the Heckscher–Ohlin model by relaxing assumptions underlying factor price equalization to generate high predictive success using the model to forecast international trade. His research scholarship has focused on economic geography and the inequality within cities.
