= International factor movements =

International movement of people, resources and means of production

In international economics, international factor movements are movements of labor, capital, and other factors of production between countries. International factor movements occur in three ways: immigration/emigration, capital transfers through international borrowing and lending, and foreign direct investment. International factor movements also raise political and social issues not present in trade in goods and services. Nations frequently restrict immigration, capital flows, and foreign direct investment.

== Substitutability of factors and commodities ==
Trade in goods and services can to some extent be considered a substitute for factor movements. In the absence of trade barriers, even when factors are not mobile, there is a tendency toward factor price equalization. In the absence of barriers to factor mobility, commodity prices will move toward equalization, even if commodities may not freely move. However, complete substitution between factors of production and commodities is only theoretical, and will only be fully realized under the economic model called the Heckscher–Ohlin model, or the 2×2×2 model, wherein there are two-countries, two-commodities, and two factors of production. While the assumptions of that model are unlikely to hold true in reality, the model is still informative as to how prices of factors and commodities react as trade barriers are erected or removed.

== International labor mobility ==
International labor migration is a key feature of our international economy. For example, many industries in the United States are heavily dependent on legal and illegal labor from Mexico and the Caribbean. Middle Eastern economic development has been fueled by laborers from South Asian countries, and several European countries have had formal guest-worker programs in place for years. The United Nations estimated that more than 175 million people, roughly 3 percent of the world’s population, live in a country other than where they were born.

International labor mobility is a politically contentious subject, particularly when considering the illegal movements of people across international borders to seek work. For example, a number of European countries saw the rise in the 1990s of a number of anti-immigrant political parties such as the National Front in France, the National Alliance in Italy, and the Republikaner in Germany. The subject is equally contentious among academics who have espoused numerous theories for the effects of immigration, both illegal and legal, on foreign and domestic economies. Traditional international economic theory maintains that reducing barriers to labor mobility results in the equalization of wages across countries.

This can be demonstrated easily with a graphical model. First, the wage rate in a particular country can be shown graphical by looking at the marginal product of labor (MPL). The MPL curve demonstrates the real wage rate at any given level of employment in an economy.

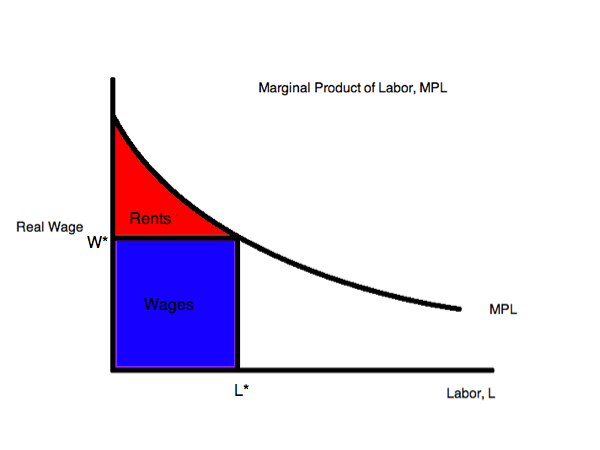

Now, consider a model where there are two countries: Home and Foreign. Each country is represented by a MPL curve. Initially, Home's labor force is at point C and Foreign's labor force is at point B. In the absence of labor mobility, these points would stay the same. However, when you allow labor to move between countries, assuming the costs of movement are zero, the real wage converges on point A, and workers in Home move to Foreign where they will earn a higher wage.

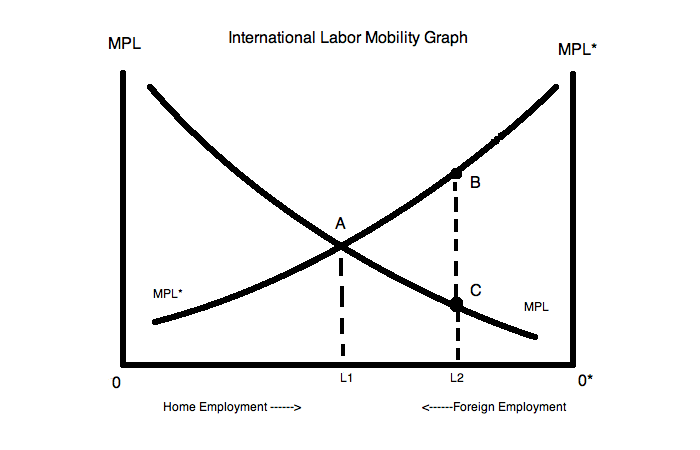

=== Substitutability and complementarity of foreign and domestic labor ===
Some have argued that guest workers, including perhaps illegal workers in some instances, help insulate domestic populations from economic fluctuations. In times of economic prosperity more guest workers may be needed. While during economic downturns guest workers may be required to return to their country of origin. However, it is often simultaneously argued that cheaper foreign labor may be necessary for the preservation of import-competing industries. Looking at those two arguments together presents a contradiction between these two alleged benefits. When migrant workers are sent home during economic downturns and native workers take their place, the assumption is that the two types of labor are substitutes, but if cheap labor is necessary to make domestic industries competitive, this requires migrant labor to be complementary. Different types of labor (e.g., skilled and unskilled) may be complements and substitutes at the same time. For example, skilled laborers may need unskilled laborers to work in the factories skilled laborers design, but at the same time an influx of unskilled labor may make capital intensive production less economically attractive than labor-intensive production, reducing the competitiveness of skilled laborers that design high-tech goods. However, the same type of labor, cannot be both a complement and substitute. For example, foreign unskilled workers will either be a substitute or complement to domestic unskilled workers; they cannot be both. The economic well being of domestic workers will tend to rise if complementary foreign labor enters the market, but their economic well being, a function of their wage, will fall if substitute foreign labor enters the market.

A number of scholars who study the effects of international labor mobility have argued that complementary immigration, which deviates from the outcome predicted by the above model, is a common phenomena. Illegal immigration in the United States provides one useful example of this critique. The above model would predict that illegal immigration in the United States would cause the wages of domestic unskilled workers to fall. Illegal immigrants would move to the United States seeking higher wages than in their home countries. The influx of foreign laborers willing to work for wages below the pre-immigration market price in the United States would cause wages for U.S. domestic unskilled workers to fall and cause U.S. domestic unskilled workers to lose their jobs to the new foreign workers.

However, there is both theoretical and empirical evidence that this may not always be the case. The idea behind this critique is that immigrant unskilled labor differs in certain fundamental qualities from the domestic unskilled labor force. The central difference may be immigrants willingness to work in particular occupations that are shunned by domestic unskilled workers. The occupations that foreign unskilled workers fall into may in some cases actually be complements to the occupations of domestic unskilled workers, and, therefore, the work of the foreign unskilled workers could raise the marginal productivity of domestic laborers, rather than reduce their wages and employment rates as the traditional model predicts.

A great deal of empirical research has been done to assess the impact of certain groups of foreign workers. Most of these empirical studies attempt to measure the impact of immigration by looking at a cross-section of cities or regions in a country and using variations in immigrant or foreign worker density to determine how immigrants effect a particular variable of interest. Wages of domestic and foreign workers are obviously a common variable of interest. There are problems with this approach, however. In open economies with free trade, factor price equalization is likely to occur, so even if immigrants affect native national wages, the uneven distribution of immigrants across the nation may not result in long run cross-sectional wage differences. In the short run though, wage differences could indeed be present. Another issue is that immigrants may selectively move to cities that are experiencing high growth and an increase in wages. It has been suggested, however, that this issue can be resolved if wage data is examined over a period of time. In Friedburg and Hunt's survey of empirical immigration studies in 1995, they authors found that while some cross-sectional studies showed a slight decrease in domestic worker wages as a result of immigration, the effect was only slight, and not particularly detrimental. Pischke and Velling came to similar conclusions in a cross-sectional German immigration study.

Studies have also been done using "natural experiments" and time series data, which had findings similar to the cross-sectional studies. However, George Borjas, of Harvard University, and several other economists have used time series studies and looked at wage inequality data and found that immigration does have a significant effect on domestic laborers. There are several factors, however, that might lead to the overestimation of the effects of immigration using the wage inequality methodology. The primary problem in past studies was the limitations on available data. The wage inequality studies may therefore represent an upper boundary for what the real effect of immigration is on domestic wages.

== International borrowing and lending ==
International borrowing and lending is another type of international factor movement; however, the "factor" being moved here is not physical, as it is with labor mobility. Instead, it is a financial transaction. It is also known as portfolio investment. International lending takes place through both private, commercial banks and through international, public banks, like multilateral development banks. It can be classified as a type of intertemporal trade, i.e., the exchange of resources over time. Intertemporal trade represents a tradeoff of goods today for goods tomorrow, and it can be contrasted with intratemporal trade, an exchange of goods taking place immediately. Intertemporal trade is measured by the current account of the balance of payments.

According to the time value of money, the present value of money is not equal to its future value (e.g., $1000 today is worth more than $1000 a year from now). Those wishing to borrow money from a lender must provide a measure of compensation above the value of the principal being borrowed. This compensation usually happens in the form of an interest rate payment. People do not all have the same demand for present and future consumption, so if borrowing and lending are allowed the "price of future consumption", i.e., the interest rate, will emerge. For the purposes of international economics, countries can be thought of in the same way as people. If a country has a relatively high interest rate, that would mean it has a comparative advantage in future consumption—an intertemporal comparative advantage. Countries that borrow from the international market are, therefore, those that have highly productive current investment opportunities. Countries that lend are in the opposite situation.

== Foreign direct investment ==
Foreign Direct Investment (FDI) is the ownership of assets in a country by foreigners where the ownership is intended to provide control over those assets. The foreign owner is often a firm. FDI is one way in which factors of production, specifically capital, move internationally. It is distinct from international borrowing and lending of capital because the intent of FDI is not simply to transfer resources; FDI is also intended to establish control.

Two aspects of the above definition are often debated due to their inherent ambiguity. First, if a firm acquires an ownership interest in another firm, how do we determine the "nationality" of either the acquiring or acquired firms? Many companies operate in multiple countries, making it difficult to assign them a nationality. For example, Honda has factories in multiple countries, including the United States, but the firm began in Japan. How, therefore, should we assign a nationality to Honda? Should it be on the basis of where the company was founded, where it primarily produces, or some other metric? Assigning a nationality is particularly problematic for firms founded countries with very small domestic markets and for companies that specifically focus on selling goods on the international market.

The second problem with FDI's definition is the meaning of "control." The U.S. Department of Commerce has defined FDI as when a single foreign investor acquires an ownership interest of 10% or more in a U.S. firm. The number 10%, however, is somewhat arbitrary, and it is easy to see how the Commerce Department's definition might not capture all instances of actual foreign control. For example, a group of investors in a foreign country could buy 9% of a U.S. firm and still use that ownership to exercise some measure of control. Alternatively, a foreign investor that purchases 10% of a U.S. firm may have no intention of exercising control over the company.

One important question economists have preoccupied themselves with regarding FDI is why ownership of domestic resources could be more profitable for foreign firms than for domestic firms. This questions rests on the assumption that, all things being equal, domestic firms should have an advantage over foreign firms in production in their own country. There are many explanations for why foreign firms acquire control over businesses in other countries. The foreign firm may simply have greater knowledge and expertise regarding productions methods, which gives it an advantage over domestic firms. The acquisition of a foreign firm could be based on a global business strategy. Finally, foreign firms might use a different discount rate or return on investment, which are essentially "cost of capital" considerations, when evaluating investment opportunities. However, Krugman and Graham, through a survey of the relevant literature, concluded that industrial organization considerations are more likely than cost of capital concerns to be the driving force for FDI.

== Multinational enterprises ==
Multinational enterprises (MNEs) manage production or deliver services in more than one country. According to the United Nations Conference on Trade and Development's World Investment Report from 2007, as of 2005 there were over 77,000 parent company MNEs and 770,000 foreign affiliates. From an international economics viewpoint, there are two central questions about why MNEs exist. The first question is why goods and services are produced in multiple countries, instead of a single country. The second central question regarding MNEs is why certain firms decide to produce multiple products—why they internalize other areas of production. The first question can be answered rather simply. Different countries have different resources that companies may need for production. Also, transport costs and barriers to trade often mean the MNEs are necessary to access a particular market. The short answer to the second question it that firms internalize because it is more profitable for them to do so, but the exact reasons behind why it is more profitable to internalize are a more difficult issue. One possible reason for internalization is to insulate MNEs from opportunistic business partners through vertical integration. Technology transfer (here defined as any kind of useful economic knowledge) is also posited as a reason for internalization. A detailed discussion of these issues, however, is outside the scope of this article.
