= Tadeusz Rybczynski =

Polish-English economist

Tadeusz Mieczysław Rybczyński (also Rybczynski; 1923–1998) was a Polish-English economist who is known for the development of the Rybczynski theorem (1955).

He studied at the London School of Economics. Soon after discovering his famous theorem, he joined Lazard and spent the rest of his career there as an investment banker.
