= Heckscher–Ohlin model =

Economic model for international trade

Basic situation: Two otherwise identical countries (A and B) have different initial factor endowments. Autarky equilibrium ($A^A, A^B$): no trade, individual production equals consumption. Trade equilibrium: both countries consume the same ($C^A = C^B$), especially beyond their own Production–possibility frontier; production and consumption points are divergent.

The Heckscher–Ohlin model (/hɛkʃr ʊˈliːn/, H–O model) is a general equilibrium mathematical model of international trade, developed by Eli Heckscher and Bertil Ohlin at the Stockholm School of Economics. It builds on David Ricardo's theory of comparative advantage by predicting patterns of commerce and production based on the resources of a trading region. The model essentially says that countries export the products which use their relatively abundant and cheap factors of production, and import the products which use the countries' relatively scarce factors.

== Features of the model ==
Relative endowments of the factors of production (land, labor, and capital) determine a country's comparative advantage. Countries have comparative advantages in those goods for which the required factors of production are relatively abundant locally. This is because the profitability of goods is determined by input costs. Goods that require locally abundant inputs are cheaper to produce than those goods that require locally scarce inputs.

For example, a country where capital and land are abundant but labor is scarce has a comparative advantage in goods that require lots of capital and land, but little labor — such as grains. If capital and land are abundant, their prices are low. As they are the main factors in the production of grain, the price of grain is also low—and thus attractive for both local consumption and export. Labor-intensive goods, on the other hand, are very expensive to produce since labor is scarce and its price is high. Therefore, the country is better off importing those goods.

The comparative advantage is due to the fact that nations have various factors of production, the endowment of factors is the number of resources such as land, labor, and capital that a country has. Countries are endowed with multiple factors which explains the difference in the costs of a particular factor when a cheaper factor is more abundant. The theory predicts that nations will export the goods that make the most of the factors that are abundant in their soil and will import those that are made with scarce factors. Thus, this theory aims to explain the scheme of international trade that we observe in the world economy. Ohlin and Heckscher's theory advocates that the pattern of international trade is determined by differences in factor endowments rather than by differences in productivity. The endowments are relative and not absolute. One nation may have more land and workers than another but be relatively abundant in one of two factors. For example; The United States is a leading exporter of agricultural products, which reflects its great abundance of arable land, and on the other hand, China excels in the export of goods made with cheap labor such as textiles or shoes. This demonstrates why the United States has been a large importer of these Chinese products since it does not abound in cheap labor.

== Theoretical development ==
While still building on traditional models such as the Ricardian framework, the mid 1900s bring forth innovation in international trade theory with the introduction of the Heckscher-Ohlin (H-O) model, developed by Swedish economists Eli Heckscher and Bertil Ohlin from the Stockholm School of Economics. The H-O model advances international trade theory by introducing the concept of factor endowments within a country as well as the underlying causes for differences in comparative costs between countries, while assuming countries will have identical production technologies. The H-O framework finds that countries have differing comparative costs even though they have the same production technologies due to differences in factors of production, such as the geographical abundance of natural resources or population size. Furthermore, what the H-O model concludes is that traded commodities are essentially bundles of factors (land, labor, and capital) and therefore the international trade of commodities is indirect factor arbitrage (Leamer 1995).The H-O model more accurately describes international trade patterns in modern times (post WWII) due to the increased ability of transferring knowledge/ production technologies between countries, mainly focusing on factorial differences such as labor force and resource allocation as to why countries trade with each other. The Ricardian model of comparative advantage has trade ultimately motivated by differences in labour productivity using different "technologies". Heckscher and Ohlin did not require production technology to vary between countries, so (in the interests of simplicity) the "H–O model has identical production technology everywhere". Ricardo considered a single factor of production (labour) and would not have been able to produce comparative advantage without technological differences between countries (all nations would become autarkic at various stages of growth, with no reason to trade with each other). The H–O model removed technology variations but introduced variable capital endowments, recreating endogenously the inter-country variation of labour productivity that Ricardo had imposed exogenously. With international variations in the capital endowment like infrastructure and goods requiring different factor "proportions", Ricardo's comparative advantage emerges as a profit-maximizing solution of capitalist's choices from within the model's equations. The decision that capital owners are faced with is between investments in differing production technologies; the H–O model assumes capital is privately held.

=== Original publication ===
Bertil Ohlin first explained the theory in a book published in 1933. Ohlin wrote the book alone, but he credited Heckscher as co-developer of the model because of his earlier work on the problem, and because many of the ideas in the final model came from Ohlin's doctoral thesis, supervised by Heckscher.

Interregional and International Trade itself was verbose, rather than being pared down to the mathematical, and appealed because of its new insights.

=== 2×2×2 model ===
The original H–O model assumed that the only difference between countries was the relative abundances of labour and capital. The original Heckscher–Ohlin model contained two countries, and had two commodities that could be produced. Since there are two (homogeneous) factors of production this model is sometimes called the "2×2×2 model".

The model has "variable factor proportions" between countries—highly developed countries have a comparatively high capital-to-labor ratio compared to developing countries. This makes the developed country capital-abundant relative to the developing country, and the developing nation labor-abundant in relation to the developed country.

With this single difference, Ohlin was able to discuss the new mechanism of comparative advantage, using just two goods and two technologies to produce them. One technology would be a capital-intensive industry, the other a labor-intensive business—see "assumptions" below.

=== Extensions ===
The model has been extended since the 1930s by many economists. These developments did not change the fundamental role of variable factor proportions in driving international trade, but added to the model various real-world considerations (such as tariffs) in the hopes of increasing the model's predictive power, or as a mathematical way of discussing macroeconomic policy options.

Notable contributions came from Paul Samuelson, Ronald Jones, and Jaroslav Vanek, so that variations of the model are sometimes called the Heckscher–Ohlin–Samuelson model (HOS) or the Heckscher–Ohlin–Vanek model in the neo-classical economics.

== Theoretical assumptions ==
The original, 2×2×2 model was derived with restrictive assumptions, partly for the sake of mathematical simplicity. Some of these have been relaxed for the sake of development. These assumptions and developments are listed here.

=== Both countries have identical production technology ===
This assumption means that producing the same output of either commodity could be done with the same level of capital and labour in either country. Actually, it would be inefficient to use the same balance in either country (because of the relative availability of either input factor) but, in principle this would be possible. Another way of saying this is that the per-capita productivity is the same in both countries in the same technology with identical amounts of capital.

Countries have natural advantages in the production of various commodities in relation to one another, so this is an "unrealistic" simplification designed to highlight the effect of variable factors. This meant that the original H–O model produced an alternative explanation for free trade to Ricardo's, rather than a complementary one; in reality, both effects may occur due to differences in technology and factor abundances.

In addition to natural advantages in the production of one sort of output over another (wine vs. rice, say) the infrastructure, education, culture, and "know-how" of countries differ so dramatically that the idea of identical technologies is a theoretical notion. Ohlin said that the H–O model was a long-run model, and that the conditions of industrial production are "everywhere the same" in the long run.

=== Production output is assumed to exhibit constant returns to scale ===
In a simple model, both countries produce two commodities. Each commodity in turn is made using two factors of production. The production of each commodity requires input from both factors of production—capital (K) and labor (L). The technologies of each commodity is assumed to exhibit constant returns to scale (CRS). CRS technologies implies that when inputs of both capital and labor is multiplied by a factor of k, the output also multiplies by a factor of k. For example, if both capital and labor inputs are doubled, output of the commodities is doubled. In other terms the production function of both commodities is "homogeneous of degree 1".

The assumption of constant returns to scale CRS is useful because it exhibits a diminishing returns in a factor. Under constant returns to scale, doubling both capital and labor leads to a doubling of the output. Since outputs are increasing in both factors of production, doubling capital while holding labor constant leads to less than doubling of an output. Diminishing returns to capital and diminishing returns to labor are crucial to the Stolper–Samuelson theorem.

=== The technologies used to produce the two commodities differ ===
The CRS production functions must differ to make trade worthwhile in this model. For instance if the functions are Cobb–Douglas technologies the parameters applied to the inputs must vary. An example would be:

Arable industry: $A = {{K}^{1/3}}{{L}^{2/3}}$
Fishing industry: $F = {{K}^{1/2}} {{L}^{1/2}}$

where A is the output in arable production, F is the output in fish production, and K, L are capital and labor in both cases.

In this example, the marginal return to an extra unit of capital is higher in the fishing industry, assuming units of fish (F) and arable output (A) have equal value. The more capital-abundant country may gain by developing its fishing fleet at the expense of its arable farms. Conversely, the workers available in the relatively labor-abundant country can be employed relatively more efficiently in arable farming.

=== Factor mobility within countries ===
Within countries, capital and labor can be reinvested and reemployed to produce different outputs. Similar to Ricardo's comparative advantage argument, this is assumed to happen without cost. If the two production technologies are the arable industry and the fishing industry it is assumed that farmers can shift to work as fishermen with no cost and vice versa.

It is further assumed that capital can shift easily into either technology, so that the industrial mix can change without adjustment costs between the two types of production. For instance, if the two industries are farming and fishing it is assumed that farms can be sold to pay for the construction of fishing boats with no transaction costs.

The theory by Avsar has offered much criticism to this.

=== Factor immobility between countries ===
The basic Heckscher–Ohlin model depends upon the relative availability of capital and labor differing internationally, but if capital can be freely invested anywhere, competition (for investment) makes relative abundances identical throughout the world. Essentially, free trade in capital provides a single worldwide investment pool.

Differences in labour abundance would not produce a difference in relative factor abundance (in relation to mobile capital) because the labour/capital ratio would be identical everywhere. (A large country would receive twice as much investment as a small one, for instance, maximizing capitalist's return on investment).

As capital controls are reduced, the modern world has begun to look a lot less like the world modelled by Heckscher and Ohlin. It has been argued that capital mobility undermines the case for free trade itself, see: Capital mobility and comparative advantage Free trade critique.

Capital is mobile when:

- There are limited exchange controls
- Foreign direct investment (FDI) is permitted between countries, or foreigners are permitted to invest in the commercial operations of a country through a stock or corporate bond market

Like capital, labor movements are not permitted in the Heckscher–Ohlin world, since this would drive an equalization of relative abundances of the two production factors, just as in the case of capital immobility. This condition is more defensible as a description of the modern world than the assumption that capital is confined to a single country.

=== Commodity prices are the same everywhere ===
The 2x2x2 model originally placed no barriers to trade, had no tariffs, and no exchange controls (capital was immobile, but repatriation of foreign sales was costless). It was also free of transportation costs between the countries, or any other savings that would favor procuring a local supply.

If the two countries have separate currencies, this does not affect the model in any way—purchasing power parity applies. Since there are no transaction costs or currency issues the law of one price applies to both commodities, and consumers in either country pay exactly the same price for either good.

In Ohlin's day this assumption was a fairly neutral simplification, but economic changes and econometric research since the 1950s have shown that the local prices of goods tend to correlate with incomes when both are converted at money prices (though this is less true with traded commodities). See: Penn effect.

=== Perfect internal competition ===
Neither labor nor capital has the power to affect prices or factor rates by constraining supply; a state of perfect competition exists.

== Conclusions ==
The results of this work has been the formulation of certain named conclusions arising from the assumptions inherent in the model.

=== Heckscher–Ohlin theorem ===
Exports of a capital-abundant country come from capital-intensive industries, and labour-abundant countries import such goods, exporting labour-intensive goods in return. Competitive pressures within the H–O model produce this prediction fairly straightforwardly. Conveniently, this is an easily testable hypothesis.

=== Rybczynski theorem ===
When the amount of one factor of production increases, the production of the good that uses that particular production factor intensively increases relative to the increase in the factor of production, as the H–O model assumes perfect competition where price is equal to the costs of factors of production. This theorem is useful in explaining the effects of immigration, emigration, and foreign capital investment. However, Rybczynski suggests that a fixed quantity of the two factors of production are required. This could be expanded to consider factor substitution, in which case the increase in production is more than proportional.

=== Stolper–Samuelson theorem ===
Relative changes in output goods prices drive the relative prices of the factors used to produce them. If the world price of capital-intensive goods increases, it increases the relative rental rate and decreases the relative wage rate (the return on capital as against the return to labor). Also, if the price of labor-intensive goods increases, it increases the relative wage rate and decreases the relative rental rate.

=== Factor–price equalization theorem ===
Free and competitive trade makes factor prices converge along with traded goods prices. The FPE theorem is the most significant conclusion of the H–O model, but also has found the least agreement with the economic evidence. Neither the rental return to capital, nor the wage rates seem to consistently converge between trading partners at different levels of development.

=== Implications of factor-proportion changes ===
The Stolper–Samuelson theorem concerns nominal rents and wages. The Magnification effect on prices considers the effect of output-goods price-changes on the real return to capital and labor. This is done by dividing the nominal rates with a price index, but took thirty years to develop completely because of the theoretical complexity involved.

- The Magnification effect shows that trade liberalization actually makes the locally-scarce factor of production worse off (because increased trade makes the price index fall by less than the drop in returns to the scarce-factor induced by the Stolper–Samuelson theorem).
- The Magnification effect on production quantity-shifts induced by endowment changes (via the Rybczynski theorem) predicts a larger proportionate shift in output-quantity than in the corresponding endowment factor shift that induced it. This has implications to both labor and capital:
  - Assuming fixed capital, population growth dilutes the scarcity of labor in relation to capital. If the population growth outpaces the growth in capital by 10% this may translate into a 20% shift in the balance of employment to the labor-intensive industries.
  - In the modern world, money is much more mobile than labor, so import of capital to a country almost certainly shifts the relative factor-abundances in favor of capital. The magnification effect says that a 10% increase in national capital may lead to a redistribution of labor amounting to a fifth of the entire economy (towards capital-intensive, high-tech production). Notably, employment patterns in very poor countries can be dramatically affected by a small amount of FDI, in this model. (See also: Dutch disease.)

== Econometric testing of H–O model theorems ==
Heckscher and Ohlin considered the Factor-Price Equalization theorem an econometric success because the large volume of international trade in the late 19th and early 20th centuries coincided with the convergence of commodity and factor prices worldwide.

Modern econometric estimates have shown the model to perform poorly, however, and adjustments have been suggested, most importantly the assumption that technology is not the same everywhere. This change would mean abandoning the pure H–O model.

=== Leontief paradox ===
In 1954 an econometric test by Wassily W. Leontief of the H–O model found that the United States, despite having a relative abundance of capital, tended to export labor-intensive goods and import capital-intensive goods. This problem became known as the Leontief paradox. Alternative trade models and various explanations for the paradox have emerged as a result of the paradox. One such trade model, the Linder hypothesis, suggests that goods are traded based on similar demand rather than differences in supply side factors (i.e., H–O's factor endowments).

=== The Vanek formula ===
Various attempts in the 1960s and 1970s have been made to "solve" the Leontief paradox and save the Heckscher–Ohlin model from failing. From the 1980s a new series of statistical tests had been tried. The new tests depended on Vanek's formula. It takes a simple form

$$\mathbf{F_C} = \mathbf{V_C} - s_C\mathbf{V}$$

where $\mathbf{F_C}$ is the net trade of factor service vector for country $c$, $\mathbf{V_C}$ the factor endowment vector for country $c$, and $s_C$ the country $c$'s share of the world consumption and $\mathbf{V}$ the world total endowment vector of factors. For many countries and many factors, it is possible to estimate the left hand sides and right hand sides independently. To put it another way, the left hand side tells the direction of factor service trade. Thus it is possible to ask how this system of equations holds. The results obtained by Bowen, Leamer and Sveiskaus (1987) were disastrous. They examined the cases of 12 factors and 27 countries for the year 1967. They found that the two sides of the equations had the same sign only for 61% of 324 cases. For the year 1983, the result was more disastrous. Both sides had the same sign only for 148 cases out of 297 cases (or the rate of correct predictions was 49.8%). The results of Bowen, Leamer, and Sveiskaus (1987) mean that the Heckscher–Ohlin–Vanek (HOV) theory has no predictive power concerning the direction of trade.

This setback prompted a further refinement of the theory, which dispensed with the classic assumption of factor price equalization (FPE). The revised version, often referred to as the 'HOV theorem without FPE', represents a weaker form of the original Heckscher-Ohlin-Vanek theory. This concept proposes that countries tend to concentrate their exports in the goods that most intensively use their abundant resources. As a result, each country's exports align with its factor endowment, leading to a situation where countries specialize in distinct 'cones of production' based on their relative factor abundances. Under this framework, goods within the same industry but produced in different countries are not perfect substitutes, as earlier versions of the Heckscher-Ohlin theory suggested. Instead, these goods are viewed as 'varieties' that differ in terms of the factors of production used, particularly in their factor intensities.

The 'HOV theorem without FPE' opened the door to new avenues of empirical testing. This theory gained increased attention as more detailed cross-country data became available, such as those from the OECD Input-Output Database or the World Input-Output Database. These new datasets revealed that the failure of factor price equalization is a crucial aspect to understanding international trade patterns. This observation led to an expectation that the updated version of the HOV theorem would offer a better fit with the empirical data. Indeed, subsequent research confirmed this expectation. Since the pioneering work of Davis and Weinstein, a number of studies have provided empirical support for the 'HOV theorem without FPE'. This marked a significant departure from the largely unsuccessful empirical tests of the previous decades.

However, despite these advances, challenges remain in testing the theorem by means of Vanek's formula. When the factor content of trade is measured using efficiency units and more disaggregated data, the correlation between the capital and skill content of trade and countries' relative abundance of capital and skilled labour is weaker than expected. This discrepancy arises because factor efficiency varies across countries. Less efficient factors are used more intensively (in natural units), making countries appear to both export those factors and be abundant in them. This creates spurious correlations that reflect productivity differences—not real specialization in goods. Also, variation in capital and skill intensity is greater across non-traded goods than across traded goods. As a result, the HOV model fits the data better at more aggregated industry levels, where capital and skilled labour from non-traded sectors are inadvertently misattributed to traded goods, leading to false positive tests.

== General Price-Trade Equilibrium ==
Paul Samuelson (1949) initialed the study of trade equilibrium in Heckscher-Ohlin model. He verbally stated an idea that, assuming the borders between the two countries were redrawn and thereby production and factors "redistributed" across the borders in the two economies, the main variables would remain unchanged. Avinash Dixit and Victor D. Norman (1980, chp.4) proposed the integrated world equilibrium (IWE) diagram to illustrate the equilibrium with mobile factors: world prices will remain unchanged when factor endowments are redistributed within the factor price equalization (FPE) set. Much literature confirmed this result fully. Elhanan Helpman and Paul Krugman (1985, p. 23-24) further used equal-trade-volume lines to illustrate trade equilibrium and the trade basics in the IWE diagram. Guo (2023) introduced a Dixit-Norman constant and used the equal trade volume line to obtain the general trade equilibrium by

$$\frac{wage (w^*)}{rental (r^*)} = \frac{World \ Capital (K^W)}{World \ Labor (L^W)}.$$

The factor-price equalization theorem about the relationship between factor prices and factor supplies is empty. This is an important supplement to show the supply-demand relationship between factor prices and factor supplies. The equilibrium links Heckscher-Ohlin theorem with factor price equalization theorem.

== Criticism ==
The critical assumption of the Heckscher–Ohlin model is that the two countries are identical, except for the difference in resource endowments. This also implies that the aggregate preferences are the same. The relative abundance in capital leads the capital-abundant country to produce the capital-intensive good cheaper than the labor-abundant country, and vice versa.

Initially, when the countries are not trading: The price of the capital-intensive good in the capital-abundant country will be bid down relative to the price of the good in the other country, the price of the labor-intensive good in the labor-abundant country will be bid down relative to the price of the good in the other country. Once trade is allowed, profit-seeking firms move their products to the markets that have (temporary) higher prices.

As a result: the capital-abundant country will export the capital-intensive good, the labor-abundant country will export the labor-intensive good.

=== Predictive power ===
The original Heckscher–Ohlin model and extended model such as the Vanek model performs poorly, as shown in the section "Econometric testing of H–O model theorems". Daniel Trefler and Susan Chun Zhu summarizes their paper that "It is hard to believe that factor endowments theory [editor's note: in other words, Heckscher–Ohlin–Vanek Model] could offer an adequate explanation of international trade patterns".

A common understanding exists that in the national level HOV model fits well. In fact, Davis and others found that HOV model fitted extremely well with the regional data of Japan. Even when the HOV formula fits well, it does not mean that Heckscher–Ohlin theory is valid. Indeed, Heckscher–Ohlin theory claims that the state of factor endowments of each country (or each region) determines the production of each country (respectively of each region) but Bernstein and Weinstein found that the factor endowments have little predictive power. The factor-endowments-driven model (FED model) has errors much greater than the HOV model.

Unemployment is the vital question in any trade conflict. Heckscher–Ohlin theory excludes unemployment by the very formulation of the model, in which all factors (including labour) are employed in the production.

=== Leontief paradox ===
The Leontief paradox, presented by Wassily Leontief in 1953, found that the U.S. (the most capital-abundant country in the world by any criterion) exported labor-intensive commodities and imported capital-intensive commodities, contrary to the Heckscher–Ohlin theory.

However, if labor is separated into two distinct factors, skilled labor and unskilled labor, the Heckscher–Ohlin theorem is more accurate. The U.S. tends to export skilled-labor-intensive goods, and tends to import unskilled-labor-intensive goods.

=== Factor equalization theorem ===
The factor equalization theorem (FET) applies only to the most advanced countries. The average wage in Japan was once as big as 70 times the wage in Vietnam. These wage discrepancies are not normally in the scope of the H–O model analysis.

Heckscher–Ohlin theory is badly adapted to the analyze south–north trade problems. The assumptions of H–O are unrealistic with respect to north–south trade. Income differences between North and South is the concern that third world cares most. The factor price equalization theorem has not shown a sign of realization, even for a long time lag of a half century.

=== Identical production function ===
The standard Heckscher–Ohlin model assumes that the production functions are identical for all countries concerned. This means that all countries are in the same level of production and have the same technology, yet this is highly unrealistic. Technological gap between developed and developing countries is the main concern for the development of poor countries. The standard Heckscher–Ohlin model ignores all these vital factors when one wants to consider development of less developed countries in the international context. Even between developed countries, technology differs from industry to industry and firm to firm base. Indeed, this is the very basis of the competition between firms, inside the country and across the country. See the New Trade Theory in this article below.

=== Capital as endowment ===
In the modern production system, machines and apparatuses play an important role. What is referred to as capital is nothing other than these machines and apparatuses, together with materials and intermediate products consumed in the production process. Capital is the most important of factors, or one should say as important as labor. By the help of machines and apparatuses, the human being got a tremendous production capability. These machines, apparatuses and tools are classified as capital, or more precisely as durable capital, for one uses these items for many years. Their quantity is not changed at once. But the capital is not an endowment given by the nature. It is composed of goods manufactured in the production and often imported from foreign countries. In this sense, capital is internationally mobile and the result of past economic activity. The concept of capital as natural endowment distorts the real role of capital. Capital is a production power accumulated by the past investment.

=== Homogeneous capital ===
Capital goods take different forms. It may take the form of a machine-tool such as lathe or a conveyor belt. Capital goods can be highly specialised and have no use beyond the precise operation they are intended for. Despite this, capital in the Heckscher–Ohlin model is assumed to be homogeneous and transferable to any form if necessary. This assumption not only conflicts with the observable diversity and specificity of the capital stock, but also contains a further flaw, namely in how the amount of capital is measured. Usually, this would be done through the price system, which depends on the profit rate. However, In the Heckscher–Ohlin model, the rate of profit is determined according to how abundant capital is. If capital is scarce, it has a high rate of profit. If it is abundant, the profit rate is low. Therefore, before the profit rate is determined, the amount of capital is not measured - but we need to know the amount of capital to know the rate of profit! This logical difficulty was the subject of the so-called Cambridge Capital Controversies, which ultimately concluded that the concept of homogeneous capital was untenable. This is a serious blow to Heckscher-Ohlin theory, which has not been able to refute this theoretical flaw at the heart of the model.

Usually by a system of prices. But prices depend on profit rate.

=== No room for firms ===
Standard Heckscher–Ohlin theory assumes the same production function for all countries. This implies that all firms are identical. The theoretical consequence is that there is no room for firms in the H–O model. By contrast, the New Trade Theory emphasizes that firms are heterogeneous.

=== Political background ===
From the middle of the 19th century to 1930s, giant flows of immigration took place from Europe to North America. It is estimated that more than 60 million people crossed the Atlantic Ocean. Some politicians worried about negative consequences of immigration, such as cultural conflicts. For those politicians, the Heckscher-Ohlin theory of Trade provided a good reason "in support of both restrictions on labor migration and free trade in goods".

== Alternatives theories of trade ==
=== New Trade Theory ===
New Trade Theory analyses individual enterprises and plants in an international competitive situation. The classical trade theory—i.e., the Heckscher–Ohlin model—has no enterprises in mind. The new trade theory treats enterprises in an industry as identical entities. "New" New Trade Theory (NNTT) gives focus on the diversity of enterprises. It is a fact that some enterprises engage in export and some do not. Some enterprises invest directly in the foreign country in order to produce and sell in that country. Some other enterprises engage only in export. Why does this kind of differences occur? New Trade Theory tries to find out the reasons of these well observed facts.

New Trade theorists challenge the assumption of diminishing returns to scale, and some argue that using protectionist measures to build up a huge industrial base in certain industries would then allow those sectors to dominate the world market via a network effect.

See also Intra-industry trade.

=== Gravity model of trade ===
The gravity model of international trade predicts bilateral trade flows based on the economic sizes of two nations, and the distance between them.

=== Ricardo–Sraffa trade theory ===
Ricardian theory is now extended in a general form to include not only labor, but also inputs of materials and intermediate goods. In this sense, it is much more general and plausible than the Heckscher–Ohlin model and escapes the logical problems such as capital as endowments, which is, in reality, produced goods.

As the theory permits different production processes to coexist in an industry of a country, the Ricardo–Sraffa theory can give a theoretical basis for the New Trade Theory.

== See also ==
- A rising tide lifts all boats
- Balassa–Samuelson effect – an international trade model with traded and non-traded economic sectors
- Beggar thy neighbour
- Comparative advantage – an international trade model with varying technology between countries
- Free trade
- Gravity model of trade
- International factor movements
- Intra-industry trade
- List of international trade topics
- Linder hypothesis
- Stolper–Samuelson theorem
