= Heckscher–Ohlin theorem =

Macroeconomic trade theorem

Basic situation: Two identical countries (A and B) have different initial factor endowments. Autarky equilibrium ($A^A, A^B$): no trade, individual production equals consumption. Trade equilibrium: both countries consume the same ($C^A = C^B$), especially beyond their own Production–possibility frontier; production and consumption points are divergent.

The Heckscher–Ohlin theorem is one of the four critical theorems of the Heckscher–Ohlin model, developed by Swedish economist Eli Heckscher and Bertil Ohlin (his student). In the two-factor case, it states: "A capital-abundant country will export the capital-intensive good, while the labor-abundant country will export the labor-intensive good."

The critical assumption of the Heckscher–Ohlin model is that the two countries are identical, except for the difference in resource endowments. This also implies that the aggregate preferences are the same. The relative abundance in capital will cause the capital-abundant country to produce the capital-intensive good cheaper than the labor-abundant country and vice versa.

Initially, when the countries are not trading:

- the price of the capital-intensive good in the capital-abundant country will be bid down relative to the price of the good in the other country,
- the price of the labor-intensive good in the labor-abundant country will be bid down relative to the price of the good in the other country.

Once trade is allowed, profit-seeking firms will move their products to the markets that have (temporary) higher price. As a result:

- the capital-abundant country will export the capital-intensive good,
- the labor-abundant country will export the labor-intensive good.

The Leontief paradox, presented by Wassily Leontief in 1951, found that the U.S. (the most capital-abundant country in the world by any criterion) exported labor-intensive commodities and imported capital-intensive commodities, in apparent contradiction with the Heckscher–Ohlin theorem. However, if labor is separated into two distinct factors, skilled labor and unskilled labor, the Heckscher–Ohlin theorem is more accurate. The U.S. tends to export skilled-labor-intensive goods, and tends to import unskilled-labor-intensive goods.

== Related theorems ==
- Factor price equalization – The relative prices for two identical factors of production will eventually be equalized across countries because of international trade.
- Stolper–Samuelson theorem – A rise in the relative price of a good will lead to a rise in the return to that factor which is used most intensively in the production of the good, and conversely, to a fall in the return to the other factor.
- Rybczynski theorem – When only one of two factors of production is increased there is a relative increase in the production of the good using more of that factor. This leads to a corresponding decline in that good's relative price as well as a decline in the production of the good that uses the other factor more intensively.

== Literature ==
- Appleyard, Field, & Cobb. (2006). International Economics (5th ed.). McGraw–Hill Irwin. ISBN 0-07-287737-5.
- Case, Karl E. & Fair, Ray C. (1999). Principles of Economics (5th ed.). Prentice-Hall. ISBN 0-13-961905-4.
