= Stolper–Samuelson theorem =

Macroeconomic trade theorem

The Stolper–Samuelson theorem is a theorem in Heckscher–Ohlin trade theory. It describes the relationship between relative prices of output and relative factor returns—specifically, real wages and real returns to capital.

The theorem states that—under specific economic assumptions (constant returns to scale, perfect competition, equality of the number of factors to the number of products)—a rise in the relative price of a good will lead to a rise in the real return to that factor which is used most intensively in the production of the good, and conversely, to a fall in the real return to the other factor.

== History ==
It was derived in 1941 from within the framework of the Heckscher–Ohlin model by Wolfgang Stolper and Paul Samuelson, but has subsequently been derived in less restricted models. As a term, it is applied to all cases where the effect is seen. Ronald W. Jones and José Scheinkman show that under very general conditions the factor returns change with output prices as predicted by the theorem. If considering the change in real returns under increased international trade a robust finding of the theorem is that returns to the scarce factor will go down, ceteris paribus. An additional robust corollary of the theorem is that a compensation to the scarce factor exists which will overcome this effect and make increased trade Pareto optimal. The original Heckscher–Ohlin model was a two-factor model with a labor market specified by a single number. Therefore, the early versions of the theorem could make no predictions about the effect on the unskilled labor force in a high-income country under trade liberalization. However, more sophisticated models with multiple classes of worker productivity have been shown to produce the Stolper–Samuelson effect within each class of labor: Unskilled workers producing traded goods in a high-skill country will be worse off as international trade increases, because, relative to the world market in the good they produce, an unskilled first world production-line worker is a less abundant factor of production than capital.

The Stolper–Samuelson theorem is closely linked to the factor price equalization theorem, which states that, regardless of international factor mobility, factor prices will tend to equalize across countries that do not differ in technology.

== Derivation ==
Considering a two-good economy that produces only wheat and cloth, with labor and land being the only factors of production, wheat a land-intensive industry and cloth a labor-intensive one, and assuming that the price of each product equals its marginal cost, the theorem can be derived.

The price of cloth should be:

(1) $P(C)= ar + bw, \,$

with P(C) standing for the price of cloth, r standing for rent paid to landowners, w for wage levels and a and b respectively standing for the amount of land and labor used, and do not change with the prices of goods.

Similarly, the price of wheat would be:

(2) $P(W) = cr + dw \,$

with P(W) standing for the price of wheat, r and w for rent and wages, and c and d for the respective amount of land and labor used, and also considered to be constant.

If, then, cloth experiences a rise in its price, at least one of its factors must also become more expensive, for equation 1 to hold true, since the relative amounts of labor and land are not affected by changing prices. It can be assumed that it would be labor—the factor that is intensively used in the production of cloth—that would rise.

When wages rise, rent must fall, in order for equation 2 to hold true. But a fall in rent also affects equation 1. For it to still hold true, then, the rise in wages must be more than proportional to the rise in cloth prices.

A rise in the price of a product, then, will more than proportionally raise the return to the most intensively used factor, and decrease the return to the less intensively used factor.

== Criticism ==
The validity of the Heckscher–Ohlin model has been questioned since the classical Leontief paradox. Indeed, Feenstra called the Heckscher–Ohlin model "hopelessly inadequate as an explanation for historical and modern trade patterns". As for the Stolper–Samuelson theorem itself, Davis and Mishra recently stated, "It is time to declare Stolper–Samuelson dead". They argue that the Stolper–Samuelson theorem is "dead" because following trade liberalization in some developing countries (particularly in Latin America), wage inequality rose, and, under the assumption that these countries are labor-abundant, the SS theorem predicts that wage inequality should have fallen. Aside from the declining trend in wage inequality in Latin America that has followed trade liberalization in the longer run (see Lopez-Calva and Lustig), an alternative view would be to recognize that technically the SS theorem predicts a relationship between output prices and relative wages.

Papers that compare output prices with changes in relative wages find moderate-to-strong support for the Stolper–Samuelson theorem for Chile, Mexico, and Brazil.

== See also ==
- Wage insurance
- Heckscher–Ohlin model
