= Wage insurance =

Proposed insurance to cover salary losses

Wage insurance is a form of proposed insurance that would provide workers with compensation if they are forced to move to a job with a lower salary. The idea is usually proposed as a response to outsourcing and the effects of globalization, although it could equally be proposed as a response to job displacement due to increasingly productive technology (e.g. factories, or computers). Economic consensus generally holds that in both cases—the integration of the global economy through free trade, on one hand, and greater technological efficiencies, on the other—the changes will have a net benefit across the world. However, economic theory also indicates that, while people over the aggregate will be better off, many individuals will not be able to keep their current job at their current wages. Those individuals may be able to retrain and move to more highly paid wages, and the reduced cost of goods (which is likely to result from either case under consideration) may offset at least some of the wage loss. These compensating effects are likely to take several years to come about, however, and some people might never be fully compensated by normal market mechanisms. Wage insurance would offer compensation in these situations.

== History ==
The idea of wage insurance has been tested as early as 1995 in Canada's Earnings Supplement Project.

Robert Litan and Lori Kletzer proposed the idea for wage insurance in United States in the 2001 paper A Prescription to Relieve Worker Anxiety.

In 2003, Kletzer issued another paper called Trade-related Job Loss and Wage Insurance: A Synthetic Review.

In 2007, the Council on Foreign Relations published The Case for Wage Insurance. In the document Robert LaLonde argues that the United States' Trade Adjustment Assistance should be modified to include a form a wage insurance.

The basic concept became the United States Department of Labor's Alternative Trade Adjustment Assistance for Older Workers (ATAA). The ATAA complements the Trade Adjustment Assistance program, which does not offer a wage subsidy or wage insurance. The TAA focuses on retraining workers while the ATAA includes a wage subsidy for workers who are considered too old to undergo retraining. The ATAA program includes a wage subsidy for laid off workers over the age of 50 who held a job with wages less than $50,000 a year, and who start a new job within 26 weeks of being laid off. The program gives a wage subsidy of half the difference between the worker's old and new wages with a maximum subsidy of $10,000. The subsidy can last for up to two years.

Writing in 2016, Kletzer noted that Barack Obama mentioned wage insurance at a public address. In the article he recommends three to five years as the minimum time period of a worker's previous job to qualify, and that insurance wouldn't be paid until the worker found a new job; hence the insurance would work against the disincentive of losing unemployment benefits.

== Economic theory ==
Economic trade theory assumes that countries will specialize and produce the goods they are relatively good at producing. This means a country that once had an equal balance between automobile and textile manufacture will concentrate all of its resources in automobile production if it trades with a country that is relatively better at textile production. While both countries will be better off overall, individual workers can still be hurt. A worker with years of experience in car manufacturing will find his skills are worthless if his country moves to specialize in textiles. The former automobile producer will have to enter the textile manufacturing industry as a low skilled worker. His wages will likely drop since he no longer has valued skills. Wage insurance would alleviate some of the consequences workers in such situations face. The worker's insurance policy would pay him a portion of the difference between his wages as a skilled automobile manufacturer to an entry level textile worker.
