= Elhanan Helpman =

Israeli economist

Elhanan Helpman אלחנן הלפמן
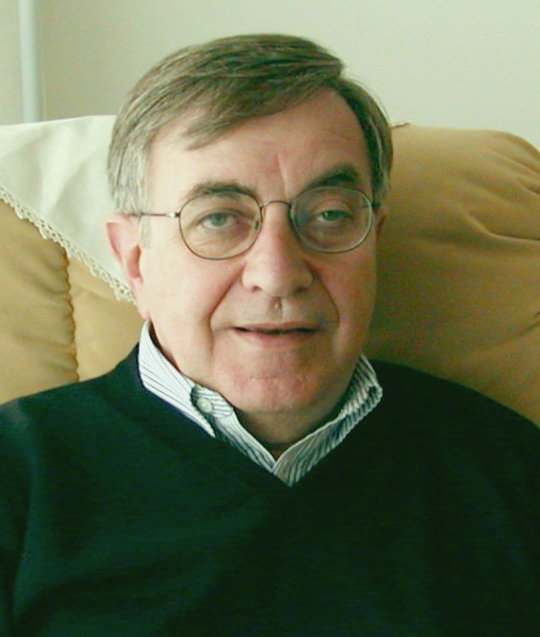
- Born: March 30, 1946 (age 80); Jalal-Abad, Kirghiz SSR, Soviet Union

Academic background
- Education: Tel Aviv University (BA, MA); Harvard University (PhD)
- Doctoral advisor: Richard E. Caves; Hendrik S. Houthakker
- Influences: Eitan Berglas; Menahem Yaari

Academic work
- Discipline: International trade Economic growth Political economy
- Institutions: Harvard University; Tel Aviv University
- Notable ideas: new trade theory, new growth theory, special interest politics, trade and market structure
- Awards: Israel Prize; BBVA Foundation Frontiers of Knowledge Award; EMET Prize; Erwin Plein Nemmers Prize in Economics; Onassis Prize
- Website: Information at IDEAS / RePEc

Elhanan Helpman (Hebrew: אלחנן הלפמן; born March 30, 1946) is an Israeli economist who is currently the Galen L. Stone Professor of International Trade at Harvard University. He is also a professor emeritus at the Eitan Berglas School of Economics at Tel Aviv University. Helpman is among the thirty most cited economists in the world according to IDEAS/RePEc.

== Biography ==
Helpman was born in Jalal-Abad, Kyrgyz SSR, in 1946 and immigrated with his family to Israel. He had planned to study engineering, but soon changed his mind. Helpman recounts the story of a friend who studied economics, and often carried Samuelson's thick textbook to evening classes. When Helpman casually picked up the book to read, he simply could not stop. It was then he realized he would become an economist. His voracious reading across multiple fields would characterize his approach to knowledge, allowing him to research in many different fields.

He graduated from Tel Aviv University twice, first with a B.A. in economics and statistics (1969) and then as a member of the first graduating class in the economics M.A. program (1971). Just three years later he completed his Ph.D. in economics at Harvard. Returning immediately to Tel Aviv University, he was a lecturer and later a university professor (1974–2004). In 1997, having already made landmark contributions in three separate areas of economics, he agreed to return to Harvard University.

He is married to Ruth Helpman, and has two daughters. A man of many interests, he is particularly passion about opera.

== Career ==
Helpman's contributions include studies of the balance of payments, exchange-rate regimes, stabilization programs and foreign debt. Most important, however, are his studies of international trade, economic growth and political economy. He is a cofounder of the "new trade theory'' and the "new growth theory,'' which emphasize the roles of economies of scale and imperfect competition. Much of his work in trade, growth, and political economy is summarized in eight books: Market Structure and Foreign Trade (with Paul Krugman), Trade Policy and Market Structure (with Paul Krugman), Innovation and Growth in the Global Economy (with Gene Grossman), Special Interest Politics (with Gene Grossman), Interest Groups and Trade Policy (with Gene Grossman), The Mystery of Economic Growth, Understanding Global Trade, Globalization and Inequality.

Helpman has also studied the Israeli economy and has been an active participant in Israeli policy debates. He was a member of the advisory board of the Bank of Israel, the Council for National Planning, and the National Council for Research and Development. In addition, he was a member of the board of directors of Bank Hapoalim.

Helpman has served on the editorial boards of several scientific journals, and served as Co-Editor of the Journal of International Economics and the Quarterly Journal of Economics and as Editor of the European Economic Review. He is a Fellow of the Econometric Society and was a member of its council. He delivered major invited lectures, such as the Frank Graham Memorial Lecture at Princeton University, the Schumpeter Lecture of the European Economic Association, of which he is also a fellow, the Walras-Bowley and Frisch Lectures of the Econometric Society and the Ohlin Lectures at the Stockholm School of Economics. He is a member of the Israeli Academy of Sciences and Humanities, a Foreign Honorary Member of the American Academy of Arts and Sciences, a Corresponding Fellow of the British Academy, a member of the European Academy of Sciences and Arts and a Distinguished Fellow of the American Economic Association. He was President of the Israeli Economic Association and President of the Econometric Society. He was awarded Honorary Doctorates by the Catholic University of Louvain and the University of Warsaw. From 2004 to 2014 he was director of the Program on Institutions, Organizations and Growth at the Canadian Institute for Advanced Research (CIFAR). He received the Mahalanobis Memorial Medal, the Bernhard Harms Prize, the Rothschild Prize, the EMET Prize, the Nemmers Prize, the Onassis Prize, the BBVA Foundation Frontiers of Knowledge Award, the Jean-Jacques Laffont Prize, and the Israel Prize.

== Books for a General Audience ==
- Helpman, Elhanan (2011-08-29). Understanding Global Trade. Harvard University Press. doi:10.4159/harvard.9780674061019. ISBN 978-0-674-06101-9. (Translated into Japanese, Chinese, Korean, Italian and Spanish.)
- Helpman, Elhanan (2004-09-30). The Mystery of Economic Growth. Harvard University Press. ISBN 978-0-674-01572-2. (Translated into Swedish, Chinese, Hebrew, Spanish, Italian and Japanese.)

== See also ==
- List of Israel Prize recipients
