= New trade theory =

Economic theory of international trade

New trade theory (NTT) is a collection of economic models in international trade theory which focuses on the role of increasing returns to scale and network effects, which were originally developed in the late 1970s and early 1980s. The main motivation for the development of NTT was that, contrary to what traditional trade models (or "old trade theory") would suggest, the majority of the world trade takes place between countries that are similar in terms of development, structure, and factor endowments.

Traditional trade models relied on productivity differences (Ricardian model of comparative advantage) or factor endowment differences (Heckscher–Ohlin model) to explain international trade. New trade theorists relaxed the assumption of constant returns to scale, and showed that increasing returns can drive trade flows between similar countries, without differences in productivity or factor endowments. With increasing returns to scale, countries that are identical still have an incentive to trade with each other. Industries in specific countries concentrate on specific niche products, gaining economies of scale in those niches. Countries then trade these niche products to each other – each specializing in a particular industry or niche product. Trade allows the countries to benefit from larger economies of scale.

Some have used NTT to argue that using protectionist measures to build up a large industrial base in certain promising industries will then allow those industries to dominate the world market. Less quantitative forms of a similar "infant industry" argument against free trade have been advanced by previous trade theorists.

== Development ==
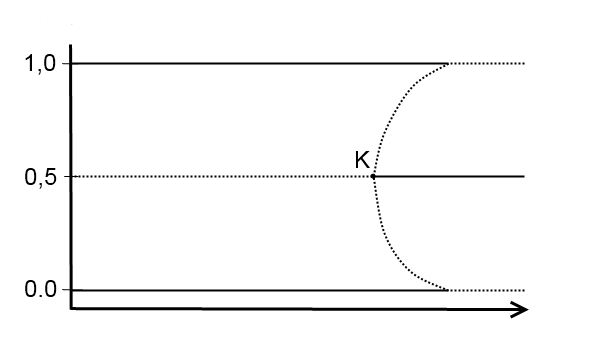
Graph illustrating Krugman's 'core-periphery' model. The horizontal axis represents costs of trade, while the vertical axis represents the share of either region in manufacturing. Solid lines denote stable equilibria, dashed lines denote unstable equilibria.

Although aspects of trade with increasing returns had been worked out earlier, especially in work by Avinash Dixit, new trade theory is associated with Paul Krugman's work in the late 1970s, developing into what is known as the Dixit-Stiglitz-Krugman trade model and the Helpman–Krugman model. Krugman states that he originally learned about the effects of monopolistic competition on trade from Robert Solow, but that theories of International economics a generation earlier had completely ignored returns to scale. In 1996 he wrote, "The idea that trade might reflect an overlay of increasing-returns specialization on comparative advantage was not there at all: instead, the ruling idea was that increasing returns would simply alter the pattern of comparative advantage."

=== "New" new trade theory ===
Marc Melitz and Pol Antràs started a new trend in the study of international trade. While new trade theory put emphasis on the growing trend of intermediate goods, this new trend emphasizes firm level differences in the same industry of the same country and this new trend is frequently called 'new' new trade theory (NNTT). NNTT stresses the importance of firms rather than sectors in understanding the challenges and the opportunities countries face in the age of globalization.

As international trade is increasingly liberalized, industries of comparative advantage are expected to expand, while those of comparative disadvantage are expected to shrink, leading to an uneven spatial distribution of the corresponding economic activities. Within the very same industry, some firms are not able to cope with international competition while others thrive. The resulting intra-industry reallocations of market shares and productive resources are much more pronounced than inter-industry reallocations driven by comparative advantage.

=== Trade in intermediate products ===
A new conspicuous phenomenon in the recent world trade is the rise of trade in intermediate goods and services. A study of the Organization for Economic Cooperation and Development (OECD) has found that "intermediate inputs represent 56% of goods trade and 73% of services trade." This is a result of fragmentation of production and the increasing importance of outsourcing, which were in turn a result of rapid decrease of trade costs (including transportation costs, transaction costs and tariffs) and revolutionary development of information and communications technologies. Trade in intermediate products are related to many phenomena such as offshoring, vertical specialization, global sourcing, the Second Unbundling, trade in value added, trade in tasks, global supply chains, global value chains, and global optimal procurement. In short it is one of motive powers of internationalization and globalization.

Traditional trade theories including Heckscher–Ohlin–Samuelson theory and the new trade theory à la Krugman exclude trade of intermediates products by assumption and cannot explain fragmentation of production across countries. Fragmentation was first studied by Ronald Jones and Henryk Kierzowski (1990). They explained the fragmentation by the decrease of service link costs. Yoshinori Shiozawa (2017, Section 13) presented a new explanation by the decrease of trade costs. The service link explains how fragmentation occurs but does not explain how a pattern of specialization emerges. Trade cost explanation is naturally incorporated in Shiozawa's theory of international trade and can be used in the account of global value chain emergence, because it is a general framework which permits trade of intermediate goods and services.

=== Theoretical foundations ===
New trade theory and "new" new trade theory (NNTT) need their own trade theory. New trade theories are often based on assumptions such as monopolistic competition and increasing returns to scale. One of the typical explanations, given by Paul Krugman, depends on the assumption that all firms are symmetrical, meaning that they all have the same production coefficients. This is too strict as an assumption and deprived general applicability of Krugman's explanation. Shiozawa, based on a much more general model, succeeded in giving a new explanation on why the traded volume increases for intermediates goods when the transport cost decreases.

"New" new trade theory (NNTT) also needs a new theoretical foundation. Melitz and his followers concentrate on empirical aspects and pay little interest to theoretical aspects of NNTT. Shiozawa's new construction, or Ricardo-Sraffa trade theory, enables Ricardian trade theory to include choice of techniques. Thus the theory can treat a situation where there are many firms with different production processes. Based on this new theory, Fujimoto and Shiozawa analyze how different production sites, either of competing firms or of the same firms locating in the different countries, compete.

== Econometric testing ==
The econometric evidence for NTT was mixed, and highly technical. Due to the timescales required, and the particular nature of production in each 'monopolizable' sector, statistical judgements were hard to make. In many ways, the available data have been too limited to produce a reliable test of the hypothesis, which doesn't require arbitrary judgements from the researchers.

Japan is cited as evidence of the benefits of "intelligent" protectionism, but Richard Beason argues the empirical support post-war Japan offers for beneficial protectionism is unusual, and that the NTT argument is based on a selective sample of historical cases. Although many examples (like Japanese cars) can be cited where a 'protected' industry subsequently grew to world status, regressions on the outcomes of such "industrial policies" (which include failures) have been less conclusive; some findings suggest that sectors targeted by Japanese industrial policy had decreasing returns to scale and did not experience productivity gains.

== Implications ==
The value of protecting "infant industries" has been defended at least since the 18th century; for example, Alexander Hamilton proposed in 1791 that this be the basis for US trade policy. What was "new" in new trade theory was the use of mathematical economics to model the increasing returns to scale, and especially the use of the network effect to argue that the formation of important industries was path dependent in a way which industrial planning and judicious tariffs might control.

The models developed predicted the national specialization-by-industry observed in the industrial world (movies in Hollywood, watches in Switzerland, etc.). The model also showed how path-dependent industrial concentrations can sometimes lead to monopolistic competition or even situations of oligopoly.

Some economists, such as Ha-Joon Chang, had argued that protectionist policies had facilitated the development of the Japanese auto industries in the 1950s, when quotas and regulations prevented import competition. Japanese companies were encouraged to import foreign production technology but were required to produce 90% of parts domestically within five years. Japanese consumers suffered in the short term by being unable to buy superior vehicles produced by the world market, but eventually gained by having a local industry that could out-compete their international rivals.

== See also ==
- General equilibrium
- Endogenous growth theory was developed at a similar time to NTT, and is linked through the idea that industrial and trade policy can affect over-all productivity growth.
- Home-market effect
- Dixit–Stiglitz model
