= Leontief paradox =

Econometric finding

In economics, the Leontief's paradox is that a country with a higher capital per worker has a lower capital/labor ratio in exports than in imports.

This econometric finding was the result of Wassily W. Leontief's attempt to test the Heckscher–Ohlin theory ("H–O theory") empirically. In 1953, Leontief found that the United States—the most capital-abundant country in the world—exported commodities that were more labor-intensive than capital-intensive, contrary to H–O theory. Leontief inferred from this result that the U.S. should adapt its competitive policy to match its economic realities.

== Measurements ==
- In 1971 Robert Baldwin showed that U.S. imports were 27% more capital-intensive than U.S. exports in the 1962 trade data, using a measure similar to Leontief's.
- In 1980 Edward Leamer questioned Leontief's original methodology for comparing factor contents of an equal dollar value of imports and exports (i.e. on real exchange rate grounds). However, he acknowledged that the U.S. paradox still appears in Baldwin's data for 1962 when using a corrected method comparing factor contents of net exports and domestic consumption.
- A 1999 survey of the econometric literature by Elhanan Helpman concluded that the paradox persists, but some studies in non-US trade were instead consistent with the H–O theory.
- In 2005 Kwok & Yu used an updated methodology to argue for a lower or zero paradox in U.S. trade statistics, though the paradox is still derived in other developed nations.

== Responses to the paradox ==
For many economists, Leontief's paradox undermined the validity of the Heckscher–Ohlin theorem (H–O) theory, which predicted that trade patterns would be based on countries' comparative advantage in certain factors of production (such as capital and labor). Many economists have dismissed the H–O theory in favor of a more Ricardian model where technological differences determine comparative advantage. These economists argue that the United States has an advantage in highly paid labor more so than capital. This can be seen as viewing "capital" more broadly, to include human capital. Using this definition, the exports of the United States are very (human) capital-intensive, and not particularly intensive in (low paying) labor.

Some explanations for the paradox dismiss the importance of comparative advantage as a determinant of trade. For instance, the Linder hypothesis states that demand plays a more important role than comparative advantage as a determinant of trade—with the hypothesis that countries which share similar demands will be more likely to trade. For instance, both the United States and Germany are developed countries with a significant demand for cars, so both have large automotive industries. Rather than one country dominating the industry with a comparative advantage, both countries trade different brands of cars between them. Similarly, new trade theory argues that comparative advantages can develop separately from factor endowment variation (e.g., in industrial increasing returns to scale).

The biggest criticism of the results of the Leontief test is that the observation has no conceptual background. Wassily Leontief (1953) attempted to explain his test verbally augmenting the idea of using the equivalent- worker-unit. Daniel Trefler (1993) creatively extended Leontief’s idea to a factor-specific model to measure the trade pattern by effective endowments. Fisher and Marshall (2011) suggested the virtual endowments of the general technological differences to test trade patterns. Guo (2024) illustrated that introducing technology differences with different factor prices will naturally introduce the trade pattern that the Leontief test explored. The analysis and prediction of trade patterns through effective endowments and virtual endowments logically covered both the Heckscher-Ohlin trade pattern and the Leontief (paradox) trade pattern. Both are trade consequences, and both gain from trade. It shows that comparative advantage works when countries have different productivities.

== See also ==
- Gravity model of trade
- List of paradoxes
