= Factor endowment =

A factor endowment, in economics, is commonly understood to be the amount of land, labor, capital, and entrepreneurship that a country possesses and can exploit for the production of capital and goods. Countries with a large endowment of resources tend to be more prosperous than those with a small endowment if all other things are equal. This concept of the relationship between a nation's factor endowment and its economic productivity underpins much of basic macroeconomics, such as the comparative advantage, international trade theory, and the Solow-Swan model.

Some argue that the development of sound institutions to access and equitably distribute these resources is necessary in order for a country to obtain the greatest benefit from its factor endowment.

== See also ==
- Environmental determinism
- Resource curse
