= Factor price equalization =

Factor price equalization is an economic theory, by Paul A. Samuelson (1948), which states that the prices of identical factors of production, such as the wage rate or the rent of capital, will be equalized across countries as a result of international trade in commodities. The theorem assumes that there are two goods and two factors of production, for example capital and labour. Other key assumptions of the theorem are that each country faces the same commodity prices, because of free trade in commodities, uses the same technology for production, and produces both goods. Crucially these assumptions result in factor prices being equalized across countries without the need for factor mobility, such as migration of labor or capital flows.

A simple summary of this theory is when the prices of the output goods are equalized between countries as they move to free trade, then the prices of the factors (capital and labor) will also be equalized between countries.

Whichever factor receives the lowest price before two countries integrate economically and effectively become one market will therefore tend to become more expensive relative to other factors in the economy, while those with the highest price will tend to become cheaper.

In a perfectly competitive market, the return to a factor of production depends upon the value of its marginal productivity. The marginal productivity of a factor, like labor, in turn depends upon the amount of labor being used as well as the amount of capital. As the amount of labor rises in an industry, labor's marginal productivity falls. As the amount of capital rises, labor's marginal productivity rises. Finally, the value of productivity depends upon the output price commanded by the good in the market.

An often-cited example of factor price equalization is wages. When two countries enter a free trade agreement, wages for identical jobs in both countries tend to approach each other.

The result was first proven mathematically as an outcome of the Heckscher–Ohlin model assumptions.

Simply stated the theorem says that when the prices of the output goods are equalized between countries as they move to free trade, then the prices of the input factors (capital and labor) will also be equalized between countries.

This theory was independently discovered by Abba Lerner in 1933 but was published much later in 1952. The "Lerner Diagram" remains a key analytical tool in teaching international trade theory.

== Application ==
Joseph Stiglitz applied factor price equalization to a dynamic economy to study the long term supply responses of capital from the classical perspective. He showed that the high interest economy is eager to trade with the low interest rate economy, and consequently it has a lower long term consumption in free trade than pre-trade. He also demonstrated that in the long run tariff or export subsidy may increase the consumption per capita in those countries, providing a simple explanation for the results.

== See also ==
- List of international trade topics
