= Intangible asset finance =

Intangible asset finance (IP finance) is the branch of finance that uses intangible assets such as intellectual property (legal intangible) and reputation (competitive intangible) to gain access to credit. Like other areas of finance, intangible asset finance is concerned with the interdependence of value, risk, and time.

== Basic principles ==
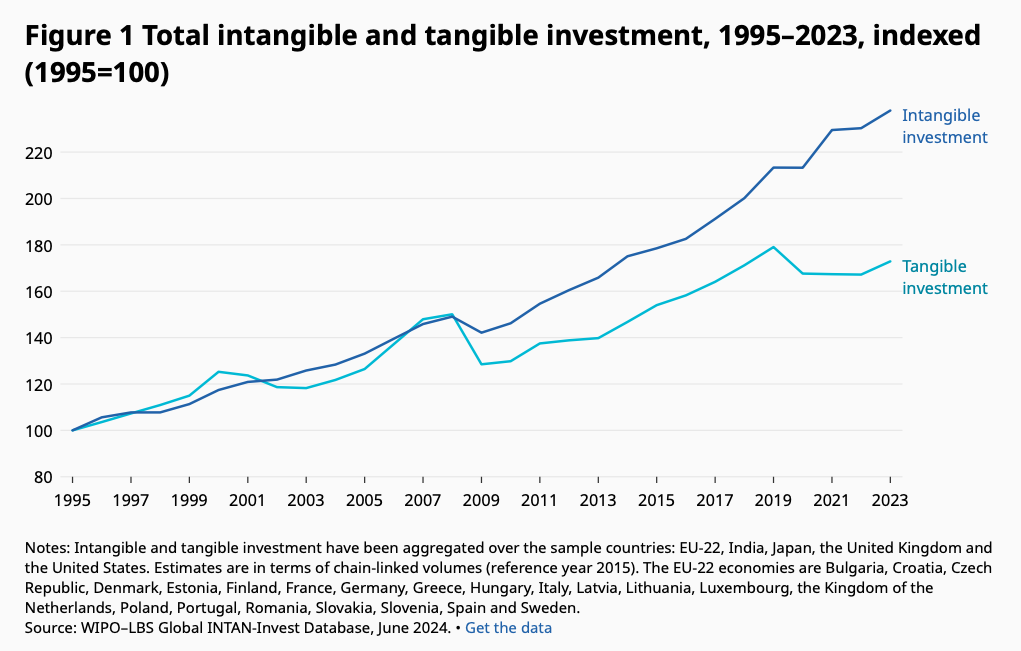
Total intangible and tangible investment 1995-2023

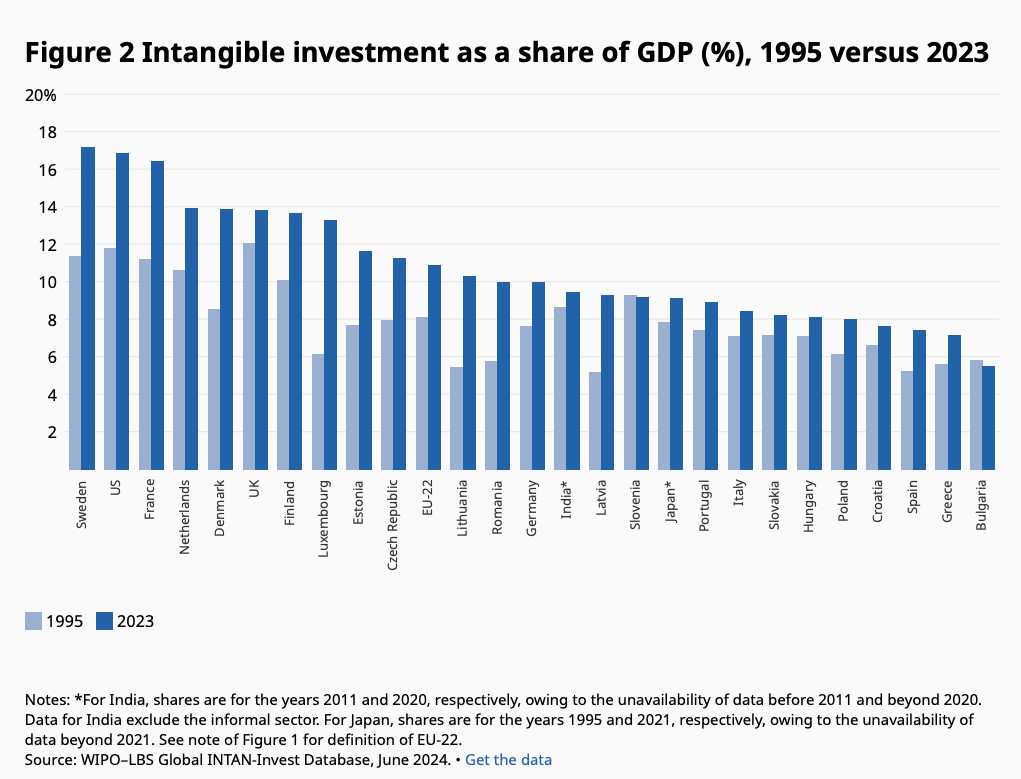
Intangible investment as a share of GDP, 1995 versus 2023. Multiple economies

Business can benefit from unlocking value from their intangible assets, with intellectual property and other intangibles adding at least double the value to products as tangible capital.

In 2003, one estimate put the economic equilibrium of intangible assets in the U.S. economy at $5 trillion, which represented over one-third or more of the value of U.S. domestic corporations in the first quarter of 2001.

Among companies in the S&P 500, intangibles including intellectual property account for 90% of the total market value.

Intangible assets include business processes, intellectual property (IP) such as patents, trademarks, reputations for ethics and integrity, quality, safety, sustainability, security, and resilience. Today, these intangibles drive cash flow and are the primary sources of risk. Intangible asset information, management, risk forecasting and risk transfer are growing services as the economic base divests itself of physical assets. Rights to tangible and intangible assets are intangible, and can be traded globally.

Policymakers have explored a variety of measures around IP-backed financing including the creation of dedicated funds; education programs to develop standards, raise awareness and promote good practice; as well as, in some cases, subsidized interest rates for loans based on IP as collateral. It is still a relatively new policy area with both firms and governments are experimenting with how they can support IP-rich businesses to grow.

== Business models using IP-backed financing ==
A number of intangible asset business models have evolved over the years.

- Patent licensing & enforcement companies ("P-LECs"): These are firms that acquire patents for the sole purpose of securing licenses and/or damages awards from infringing parties. Another name for a P-LEC is "patent troll," although this is viewed as a pejorative reference. Recently, hedge funds have raised capital for the specific purpose of investing in patent litigation.
- Royalty stream securitizers: These are firms that are engaged in the buying and selling of what are essentially specialized asset-backed securities. The assets that are securitized are typically intellectual properties, such as patents, that have been bearing royalties for a period of time. Royalty Pharma is a well known firm that uses this business model, and which has done by far the largest and most high-profile deals in this space. Royalty Pharma handled what many consider to be the first pharmaceutical patent-backed securitization to be rated by Standard and Poors, which involved a patent on the HIV drug Zerit. The other parties involved in the Zerit transaction were Yale (the owner of the patent) and Bristol Myers Squibb.
- Reinsurers: These are firms that use the techniques of reinsurance to mitigate intangible asset risks. In the same way that some firms issue cat bonds to mitigate the risks associated with extreme weather, earthquakes, or other natural disasters, firms exposed to substantial intangible risk can issue "intangible asset risk-linked securities" that transfer intangible risk to hedge funds and other players in the capital markets with a sufficient appetite for risk.
- Market makers: Firms that are working to provide more liquidity to the market for intellectual property. Early market makers offered on-line intellectual property exchanges where buyers and sellers could exchange rights in licensed intellectual property, usually patents. On April 22, 2008, Ocean Tomo reported that it had transacted approximately $70 million in its IP auctions across Europe and the United States. Between 2009 and 2015, The Intellectual Property Exchange International (IPXI), headquartered in Chicago, operated as the world's first stock exchange with an intellectual property focus. In 2017, Ocean Tomo launched its Bid to Ask market.
- Investment Research Firms: Companies that provide specific advice to investors on intellectual property issues. Recently, hedge fund managers have been hiring patent attorneys to follow and handicap outcomes in high-stakes patent cases.

== Government, societies, think tanks, and other non-profits ==
The World Intellectual Property Organization (WIPO) is a self-funding agency of the United Nations, with 193 member states. Its stated mission is to lead the development of a balanced and effective international IP system that enables innovation and creativity throughout the world. In June 2021, WIPO released its Medium Term Strategic Plan (MTSP), which included working with its partners to catalyze international discussions on the important questions of intellectual property valuation and finance. The organization is launching a new report series, studying country experiences with IP-backed financing. The series was formally launched in 2022. It includes China, Jamaica, Japan, Singapour, Switzerland, and the United Kingdom. In November 2022, WIPO held a High-level conversation on Unlocking Intangible Asset Finance, announcing its action plan on the topic. In November 2023, WIPO held their second IP Finance Dialogue.

The United Nations Commission on International Trade Law (UNCITRAL) plays a key role in developing progressive harmonization and modernization of international trade law. UNCITRAL does so by promoting the use and adoption of legislative and non-legislative instruments in a number of strategical areas of commercial law . The UNCITRAL Legislative Guide on Secured Transactions promotes low-cost credit by enhancing the availability of secured credit. In line with this objective, the Supplement on Security Rights in Intellectual Property is intended to make credit more available and at a lower cost for Intellectual property rights owner.

The Organisation for Economic Co-operation and Development (OECD), is an international organization that works in establishing evidence-based international standards and finding solutions to a range of social, economic and environmental challenges. In addition to other topics, the organization explores the role of intellectual property rights, studies the economic impact of IP regimes globally. In 2019, it produced a paper on the use intangibles to strengthen SME access to finance.

The International Financial Reporting Standards Foundation (IFRS) is a nonprofit accounting organization, which promotes the development of financial reporting standards. Its International Accounting Standards (IAS 38) set out the criteria for recognizing and measuring intangible assets: "An intangible asset is an identifiable non-monetary asset without physical substance. Such an asset is identifiable when it is separable, or when it arises from contractual or other legal rights."

== Challenges ==
The ecosystem for Intangible asset finance still faces a number of obstacles, making it difficult to scale. These transactions require more effort and take longer than more common financing deals. That is primarily due to the following factors:

- Valuing intangible is hard. Difficulties may include discrepancies between accounting values and market values, limited disclosure restricting the amount of readily available information and the lack of a common valuation framework
- Lack of familiarity with intellectual property as an asset class among lenders. Identifying the relevant intangibles, performing due diligence on them, setting up the contracts to establish rights etc. takes time
- Regulators do not encourage the use of intangibles as collateral
- High transaction costs. Complexities associated with valuation, due diligence and the administrative effort to register the resulting security interest increase translation costs
- Lack of confidence in IP valuation methodologies
- Intangible can be hard to liquidate. Before doing a deal, financiers need to feel confident they can recover their investment. But there is no liquid secondary market in which intangibles can be monetized. As a consequence, the amount paid out in the event of default is typically lower than the assessed value

== Measuring intangible investments ==
Measuring intangible investments may have the following benefits

- Up-to-date statistics on investment in intangible assets, especially with an improved coverage of emerging economies, can be used to inform pro-growth national policies.
- The data can help researchers and entrepreneurs alike understand the links between intangible assets and economic performance, not only across countries but also within companies and sectors.
- Better metrics are also crucial for improving innovation finance, including intellectual property-backed innovation finance.

The measurement of intangible assets poses several challenges. First the “non-physical” nature of intangible assets makes them intrinsically hard to measure and report. Moreover, many intangible asset types, such as brands or design, are still not recognized as investment under national accounting frameworks. The existing data also suffers from gaps in coverage and time lags, especially outside high-income economies.

The combined efforts of multiple international projects established a first harmonized database of intangible capital at the business sector level, INTAN-Invest, which proposes harmonized cross-country data on intangible investment by industry covering 15 EU countries and the United States from 1995 on. McKinsey reported that the share of total investment of intangibles as defined by the INTAN-Invest database increased by 29 percent between 1995 and 2020.

Global INTAN-Invest, launched in 2024, is a database expanding on INTAN-Invest and building on EUKLEMS & INTANProd. It features cross-country quarterly and annual measures of intangible assets for high-income but also emerging economies (contrariwise to the INTAN-Invest).

== Significant transactions ==
- 1997: David Bowie securitizes the future royalty revenues earned from his pre-1990 music catalogue by issuing Bowie Bonds.
- 2000: BioPharma Royalty Trust completes the $115 million securitization of a single Yale patent with claims covering Stavudine, which is a reverse transcriptase inhibitor and the active ingredient in the drug Zerit. This was the first publicly rated patent securitization in the U.S. At the time of the deal, Bristol Myers Squibb had the exclusive rights to distribute Zerit in the U.S. Not long after closing slow sales of Zerit along with an accounting scandal at Bristol Myers Squibb triggered the accelerated and premature amortization of the transaction. Many observers believe that this deal was ultimately unsuccessful because of a lack of diversification as it involved a single patent and a single licensee.
- 2005: UCC Capital Corporation securitization of BCBG Max Azria's royalty receivables generated from worldwide intellectual property rights worth $53 million. This transaction is recognized as the first "whole company securitization" involving primarily intangible assets. UCC Capital Corporation was founded by Robert W. D'Loren, and was acquired by NexCen Brands, Inc. in 2006. NexCen sold substantially all of its assets to Levine Leichtman Capital Partners in 2010.
- 2005: Ocean Tomo holds its first live IP auction. Although proceeds from the first auction were unremarkable, the relative success of the Ocean Tomo auctions that followed showed that the live auction is a reasonably viable business model for monetizing intellectual property.
- 2006: Marvel Entertainment's film rights securitization in conjunction with Ambac Financial Group to provide a triple-A financial guarantee on a credit facility for Marvel backed by a slate of 10 films to be produced by Marvel Studios and intellectual property related to some of Marvel's most popular comic book characters.
- 2012: Alcatel-Lucent secures €1.6 billion in a loan secured by its intellectual property portfolio and other assets.
- 2020: Aon launched an intellectual property capital market solution designed to help companies protect and maximize the value of its intangible assets. Its first deal involved an agriculture technology firm, Indigo, which gained access to $100 million through IP collaterals.
- 2020: American Airlines secured a $1.2 billion investment by Goldman Sachs Merchant Bank in the form of two senior secured note transactions to be collateralized by intellectual property and other assets.
- 2020: IP Finance Transactions of South Korea Surpass KRW 2 Trillion.
- 2021: BDC Capital provided $2.6 million in growth capital to Novarc Technologies in IP Backed-Financing Fund's first deal.
- 2021: extrinsic biosciences secures $49 million in non-dilutive growth capital from Jefferies Funding LLC in deal supported key Collateral Protection Insurance.
- 2022: Agriculture commerce bank of Zhangjiagang, based in China's Suzhou province issued a 500,000 digital yuan loan supported by intellectual property.
- 2022: BDC Capital announced the addition of eight portfolio companies to its IP-Backed financing fund.
- 2022: Chinese municipal bank issues first digital yuan loan holding IP as collateral.
- 2024: Natwest Group launches IP-based lending product.

== See also ==
- Funding
- Patent valuation
- Intellectual property analytics
