= James Markusen =

American economist, academic, and author (born 1948)

James R. Markusen
- Born: April 26, 1948 (age 78); Minneapolis, Minnesota
- Occupations: Economist, academic and author

Academic background
- Education: B.A., Economics; PHD, Economics
- Alma mater: Boston College
- Thesis: Cooperative and Non-cooperative Control of International Common Property Resources (1975)

James R. Markusen is an American economist, academic, and author. He is Distinguished Professor (emeritus) at the University of Colorado, Boulder.

Markusen is known for his works using analytical theory, numerical simulation, and empirical estimation. Among his authored works are publications in the American Economic Review, the Quarterly Journal of Economics, and the Journal of International Economics, as well as books such as Multinational Firms and the Theory of International Trade.

Markusen is a Research Associate at the National Bureau of Economic Research, a Research Fellow at the Centre for Economic Policy Research, London, and an affiliate at CESifo, Munich. He has served as the co-editor of Journal of International Economics.

== Education ==
Markusen completed his B.A. in Economics in 1970 from Boston College. Later in 1973, he obtained a PHD in Economics under the supervision of James E. Anderson and John G. Riley from the same institution.

== Career ==
Markusen began his academic career in 1972 by joining the University of Western Ontario as a professor of economics and served until 1990. In 1990, he joined the University of Colorado, where he held multiple appointments including serving as a university Distinguished Professor, Stanford Calderwood Professor of Economics from 2000 to 2003 and continues to hold the position of Distinguished Professor emeritus at the same institution. From 2008 to 2010, he served as a professor of economics at University College Dublin. In 2017, he became an Adjunct Professor at Shandong University, a position he held until 2020.

Between 1999 and 2004, he worked as a research associate at the Centre for Economics and Business Research, Copenhagen. Concurrently, he served as an Economic Policy Panelist at the Centre for Economic Policy Research London in 2000 and 2001. Since 1996, he has been a Research Fellow at the Centre for Economic Policy Research, London, and also held the position of research associate at the Institute for International Integration Studies at Trinity College Dublin since from 2003 to 2004. Additionally, he has been a research associate at the National Bureau of Economic Research since 1990.

== Research ==
Markusen's research has focused on analytical theory, empirical estimation, and numerical simulation. He has authored publications spanning the areas of multinationals, international trade, modeling and simulation, and microeconomics including books, book chapters, and articles in peer-reviewed journals.

=== International trade and economics ===
Markusen's international trade and economics research has contributed to the identification of factors that influence trade patterns. His early research investigated how multinational firms can strategically manage their valuable knowledge capital when expanding abroad, considering options like exporting, licensing, and subsidiary acquisition, while analyzing the factors influencing these choices and their impact on international specialization patterns. Focusing his research efforts on the complex decision-making process of whether and how various issues should be combined in international trade negotiations, he along with Ignatius J. Horstmann proposed a formal framework using a two-issue bargaining model, highlighting the potential benefits and trade-offs of both separate negotiations and linked negotiations. His 2007 synthetic analysis with Anthony J. Venables explored how countries' participation in the global economy, considering factors like trade costs and trade fragmentation, impacts their production specialization, trade volume, and welfare levels, revealing that while fragmentation generally increases trade and welfare, some countries may experience negative effects. In related research, he used gains-from-trade theory to analyze the effects of trade expansion through fragmentation and offshoring of new goods and intermediates and highlighted how changing trade dynamics in fragmented economies can affect the conditions under which countries benefit from liberalization. More recently in 2014, his study proposed an alternative approach to international trade analysis by examining the relationship between the characteristics of goods and services in production and consumer preferences and established a strong correlation between skilled-labor intensity and income elasticity.

=== Multinational firms and International trade ===
Markusen in his research has extensively explored the role of multinationals in the international economy. Beginning with a 1984 article, Markusen changed the focus of multinational-firm research from a macroeconomic capital market orientation to one emphasizing location and production, thereby integrating multinationals with microeconomic trade theory. His early and subsequent work advanced the view that multinationals are primarily "horizontal" firms in which affiliates roughly replicate the firms' core activities abroad to serve local markets, rather than "vertical" firms in which affiliates are links in production chains.

In his 1995 study, Markusen examined real-world data concerning multinational corporations and developed a theory on the idea of knowledge capital as a transferable element to distant production units, elucidating the reasons that drive international production. In related research, he suggested that firms can geographically separate knowledge-based activities from production, resulting in vertical and horizontal multinational corporations, with skilled-labor intensity driving the former and joint-input characteristics driving the latter. While examining the different theories of multinational firms, he developed his hybrid Knowledge Capital Model, which combined elements of both vertical and horizontal models, and provided a representation of the determinants of foreign direct investment. In his assessment of a firm's mode of operation, his work concluded that the choice between direct market entry and using a local agent depends on factors like market size and the potential for asset dissipation through agent opportunistic behavior, lower profits, with direct investment being favored in larger markets with lower downside profit-risk.

Focusing on the role of multinational firms in international economics, Markusen's book titled Multinational Firms and the Theory of International Trade provided insights into the interplay among scale economies, expenses related to trade, factor endowments, and instances of imperfect competition. A. Kokko, while reviewing the book commended Markusen's efforts in presenting a consistent general-equilibrium-theory of Multinational Firms and said "Markusen has succeeded on all three counts, although it may be somewhat of an exaggeration to say that it has been done easily: it has taken some 20 years and plenty of innovative methodology to reach a stage where the work can be summarized in one book." Concentrating his research efforts on investment liberalization and its impact on the location of firms, his study bridged the gap between the industrial organization approach and general-equilibrium trade theory, providing an understanding of international trade. Furthermore, his work highlighted the limitations of existing research in the field of multinational enterprises and emphasized the need for more formal and comprehensive theoretical frameworks that can effectively link assumptions with conclusions. Moreover, in his 2021 book titled Broadening Trade Theory: Incorporating Market Realities Into Traditional Models, he provided a view of trade theory by exploring the roles of multinational firms, demand-side dynamics, and various policy implications that have been less explored in mainstream trade economics.

=== Modeling and simulation ===
Markusen's modeling and simulation research has resulted in the development of new theories and models of international trade. In his early research, he developed a theoretical model for multinational enterprises based on shared input efficiencies, and analyzed the trade-offs between technical efficiency gains and increased market power, along with broader welfare implications for different countries. Later in 1995, he presented a model that challenged some prevailing assumptions from the 'new trade theory' and offered an alternative perspective on the dynamics of international economic relationships. In 2000, he along with Anthony J. Venables developed a model of international trade with positive trade costs and endogenous multinational firms, showing how trade costs impact trade patterns, and incentivize factor mobility and agglomeration. His 2001 study with Mattias Ganslandt introduced modeling approaches for representing international trade standards and technical regulations and advocated for their incorporation into an applied general-equilibrium framework using authentic data. Focusing his research efforts on modeling the offshoring of white-collar services, his work proposed using existing trade theory as a foundation, while adapting and combining relevant concepts into simple models, to analyze the offshoring of white-collar services and its effects in response to technological and institutional changes. Moreover, in 2009, he analyzed the interaction between optimal trade policy and firm pricing using a generalized model incorporating product differentiation and revealed that when similarity exists in substitution elasticities at national and sub-national levels, the capacity of small economies to enhance terms of trade via trade imbalances is constrained.

=== Regional economics ===
Markusen's regional economics research has investigated how factors such as infrastructure and education, impact economic development across different regions. In collaboration with Nancy Olewiler and others, he presented a two-region economic model in which a polluting firm's market presence and environmental policies were influenced by the level of disutility from pollution, leading to either competition through higher environmental standards or through undercutting pollution tax rates between regions. In his analysis of domestic-content rules in regional trade agreements, his study suggested that domestic-content rules in regional trade agreements, especially in industries with foreign multinationals heavily reliant on imported inputs, can lead to anti-competitive effects, potentially decreasing industry output and shifting economic rents to domestic firms. While examining the impact of Free Trade Area of the Americas (FTAA) on investment strategies of multinational firms outside the region, his work highlighted that while FTAA integration offers opportunities for third-country firms, the competitive advantages enjoyed by insider firms from the Americas could potentially lead to less substantial benefits for the former. More recently in 2022, he investigated changes in employment concentration and specialization across industries and occupations in United States regions and proposed a model where regional specialization is influenced by function-specific productivity differences. The research also demonstrated that decreasing costs of sourcing functions from different regions leads to reduced sector concentration and regional specialization but increased function concentration and specialization.

=== Microeconomics ===
Markusen's microeconomics research has identified microeconomic factors driving external economies, analyzed their impact on production and welfare using a general-equilibrium model, and explored how resulting industry production functions relate to established trade and growth theories. Moreover, he developed a unified model to analyze the impact of foreign-owned firms on domestic wages and suggested that being employed by a highly productive company, whether from one's own country or from abroad, leads to favorable outcomes for personal productivity.

== Awards and honors ==
- 1997 – Boulder Faculty Assembly Research Excellence Award, University of Colorado
- 2001 – Jagdish Bhagwati Award, Journal of International Economics
- 2003 – Stanford Calderwood Teaching Excellence Award, Calderwood Charitable Foundation
- 2019 – Doctor of Philosophy, Tuebingen University

== Bibliography ==
=== Books ===
- Speculation and Monopoly in Urban Development (1997) ISBN 9780802033482
- Multinational Firms and the Theory of International Trade (2002) ISBN 9780262134163
- Broadening Trade Theory: incorporating market realities into traditional models (2021) ISBN 9789811222955

=== Selected articles ===
- Markusen, J. R. (1984). "Multinationals, multi-plant economies, and the gains from trade". Journal of international economics, 16(3–4), 205–226.
- Markusen, J. R. (1995). "The boundaries of multinational enterprises and the theory of international trade". Journal of Economic perspectives, 9(2), 169–189.
- Markusen, J. R., & Venables, A. J. (1998). "Multinational firms and the new trade theory". Journal of international economics, 46(2), 183–203.
- Markusen, J. R., & Venables, A. J. (1999). "Foreign direct investment as a catalyst for industrial development". European economic review, 43(2), 335–356.
- Markusen, J. R., & Venables, A. J. (2000). "The theory of endowment, intra-industry and multi-national trade". Journal of international economics, 52(2), 209–234.
- Carr, D. L., Markusen, J. R., & Maskus, K. E. (2001). "Estimating the knowledge-capital model of the multinational enterprise". American Economic Review, 91(3), 693–708.
- Feenstra, R. C., Markusen, J. R., & Rose, A. K. (2001). "Using the gravity equation to differentiate among alternative theories of trade". Canadian Journal of Economics, 34(2), 430–447.
- Ekholm, K., Forslid, R., & Markusen, J. R. (2007), "Export platform foreign direct investment". Journal of the European Economics Association, 5, 776–795.
- Caron, J., Fally, T., Markusen, J. R. (2014), "International trade puzzles: a solution linking production and preferences". Quarterly Journal of Economics, 129, 1501–1552.
