= Absolute advantage =

Economic concept

In economics, the principle of absolute advantage is the ability of a party (an individual, or firm, or country) to produce a goods or service more efficiently than its competitors. The Scottish economist Adam Smith first described the principle of absolute advantage in the context of international trade in 1776, using labor as the only input. Since absolute advantage is determined by a simple comparison of labor productiveness, it is possible for a party to have no absolute advantage in anything.

== Origin of the theory ==
The concept of absolute advantage is generally attributed to the Scottish economist Adam Smith in his 1776 publication The Wealth of Nations, in which he countered mercantilist ideas. Smith argued that it was impossible for all nations to become rich simultaneously by following mercantilism because the export of one nation is another nation's import and instead stated that all nations would gain simultaneously if they practiced free trade and specialized in accordance with their absolute advantage. Smith also stated that the wealth of nations depends upon the goods and services available to their citizens, rather than their gold reserves.

Because Smith only focused on comparing labor productivities to determine absolute advantage, he did not develop the concept of comparative advantage. While there are possible gains from trade with absolute advantage, the gains may not be mutually beneficial. Comparative advantage focuses on the range of possible mutually beneficial exchanges.

== Examples ==
=== Example 1 ===
Figure 1
Hours of work necessary to produce one unit
Country	Cloth	Wine
UK	80	100
Portugal	120	90

Figure 2
Hours of work to commit after the specialization
Country	Cloth	Wine
UK	80 + 100	0
Portugal	0	90 + 120

According to Figure 1, the UK commits 80 hours of labor to produce one unit of cloth, which is fewer than Portugal's hours of work necessary to produce one unit of cloth. The UK is able to produce one unit of cloth with fewer hours of labor, therefore the UK has an absolute advantage in the production of cloth. On the other hand, Portugal commits 90 hours to produce one unit of wine, which is fewer than the UK's hours of work necessary to produce one unit of wine. Therefore, Portugal has an absolute advantage in the production of wine.

If the two countries specialize in producing the good for which they have the absolute advantage, and if they exchange part of the good with each other, both of the two countries can end up with more of each good than they would have in the absence of trade. In the absence of trade, each country produces one unit of cloth and one unit of wine, i.e. a combined total production of 2 units of cloth and 2 units of wine. Here, if The UK commits all of its labor (80+100) for the production of cloth for which The UK has the absolute advantage, The UK produces (80+100)÷80=2.25 units of cloth. On the other hand, if Portugal commits all of its labor (90+120) for the production of wine, Portugal produces (90+120)÷90=2.33... units of wine. The combined total production in this case is 2.25 units of cloth and 2.33 units of wine which is greater than the total production of each good had there been no specialization. Assuming free trade this will lead to cheaper prices for both goods for both countries.

=== Example 2 ===
You and your friends decided to help with fundraising for a local charity group by printing T-shirts and making birdhouses.

- Scenario 1: One of your friends, Gina, can print 5 T-shirts or build 3 birdhouses an hour. Your other friend, Mike, can print 3 T-shirts an hour or build 2 birdhouses an hour. Because your friend Gina is more productive at printing T-shirts and building birdhouses compared to Mike, she has an absolute advantage in both printing T-shirts and building birdhouses.
- Scenario 2: Suppose Gina was not as agile with the hammer and could only make 1 birdhouse an hour, but she took a screen printing class and could print 10 T-shirts an hour. Mike on the other hand takes woodworking and so he can build 5 birdhouses an hour, but he does not know the first thing about making T-shirts so he can only print 2 T-shirts an hour. While Gina would have the absolute advantage in printing shirts, Mike would have an absolute advantage in building birdhouses.

== See also ==
- Comparative advantage
- Economies of scale
- Gains from trade
- Global labor arbitrage
- Heckscher–Ohlin model
- Intra-industry trade
- New trade theory
- On the Principles of Political Economy and Taxation, by David Ricardo
- Real wages
- Relative price
- Revealed comparative advantage
- Ricardian model
- Supply and demand
- Trade
