= Contingent value rights =

Buyer's rights in corporate finance

In corporate finance, Contingent Value Rights (CVR) are rights granted by an acquirer to a company’s shareholders, facilitating the transaction where some uncertainty is inherent. CVRs may be separately tradeable securities; they are occasionally acquired (or shorted) by specialized hedge funds.

== Forms ==
These rights typically take either of two forms: (1) Event-driven CVRs compensate the owners for yet to eventuate positive developments in their business - hence protecting the acquirer against the valuation risk inherent in overpaying. (2) Price-protection CVRs are granted when payment is share based - protecting the acquired company, by providing a hedge against downside price risk in the acquirer's equity.

In the first case, CVRs are granted in scenarios in which the acquiring company does not wish to pay for a product that might not work, has a limited market, or might need significant investment; whereas on the other side, the acquired company “wants to get full value for its assets”. The CVR then “helps bridge this negotiation”. Under these rights, shareholders will receive additional cash, securities, or benefits if a specific and named event occurs - one where the value of the firm significantly increases - within a specified timeframe. CVRs are common in the biotech and pharmaceutical industries (see Valuation (finance) § Valuation of intangible assets); they are also often granted to shareholders in companies facing significant, value accretive restructuring. For an example see Media General / Nexstar Media Group.

In the second case, protection against price risk is facilitated by specifying that payment will be made at an averaged, as opposed to final, share price; a floor may also be set.

== Valuation ==
Under both, the CVR is in function, a form of option.

The first case: analogous to a call option, the payout to the CVR holder will be triggered by the event occurring, and will be zero otherwise. To determine the value of these rights, analysts will apply a modified option pricing model based on the probability of the event, the time horizon specified, and the corresponding payout rules; see Contingent claim valuation, Real options valuation, and Mergers and acquisitions § Business valuation.

The second: the CVR takes the form of a modified Asian option.

== See also ==
- Strip financing
- Hold-up problem
- Earnout
- Special situation
