= Local Economic Assessment Package =

US government software

LEAP Model
- Developer: Economic Development Research Group
- Operating system: Web-based, independent of user operating system
- Type: Economic evaluation
- Website: LEAP Model

The Local Economic Assessment Package (also known as “EDR-LEAP” or “LEAP Model”) is a web-based, interactive database and software tool used by local and regional agencies in the US to improve strategies for economic development. It provides local economic performance measures, and benchmarks for comparison of economic development factors against competing regions. It works by incorporating elements of economic base analysis as well as gap analysis and business cluster analysis to identify needs for improvement and paths for economic growth.

The LEAP Model was originally developed for the Appalachian Regional Commission. Its theory and applications are discussed in peer-reviewed journal articles.
