= Strip financing =

Investment practice

Strip financing is the repackaging of different types of obligations—debt, preferred stock, common stock etc.—into one security. The idea is to ease conflicts of interest and agency costs between the holders of the initial components, bond and stockholders.

In deals that are strip financed, returns to investors are generally derived from their equity positions (seen through how investors from time to time take losses on the debt components of the strip). Therefore, in a situation where a company is acquired through a strip-financed deal, and that company begins to default on loans, investors are more willing to renegotiate lending terms, thus avoiding the hold-up problem often seen in prior to and during bankruptcy. Also, repackaging can raise a securities' liquidity. One popular form developed in Canada was the Income Trust, which combined income from a high yield bond with a stock dividend. Beginning in 2003 this concept was expanded to the U.S. when "Income Deposit Securities" (also known as Enhanced Income Securities) were first offered on the American Stock Exchange (AMEX). These consist of a high yield bond and a class of common stock committed to pay a high dividend from free cash flows combined as a single unit.

== See also ==
- Securitization
- Contingent value rights
- Earnout
