= Trade gains =

Trade gains may refer to:

- Gains from trade, the net benefits to economic agents from voluntary exchange in economics
- Capital gain, the profit realized from the sale or trading of a capital asset or security
