= Patent valuation =

Intellectual property assets such as patents are the core of many organizations and transactions related to technology. Licenses and assignments of intellectual property rights are common operations in the technology markets, as well as the use of these types of assets as loan security. These uses give rise to the growing importance of financial valuation of intellectual property, since knowing the economic value of patents is a critical factor in order to define their trading conditions.

== Cases of application ==
Valuation of patent rights is one of the main activities related to intellectual property management within an organization or company. Indeed, knowing the economic value and importance of the intellectual property rights assists in the strategic decisions to be taken on the company's assets, but also facilitates the commercialization and transactions concerning intellectual property rights.

There are several business situations where valuation is required:

=== Valuation of a company for the purposes of a merger, acquisition, joint venture or bankruptcy ===
Most of the technological companies are highly based on intangible assets and investment in knowledge, research and innovation. According to studies, expenditures on knowledge, through investments in R&D or software, have grown at a higher rate than expenditures in tangible assets. This change in investments has consequently been reflected by a heavy importance of intangible assets and patents in companies. Therefore, to know the value of companies it is essential to know the value of their intellectual property.

=== Negotiations to sell or license intellectual property rights ===
As in other business transactions, organizations negotiating agreements to sell or license intellectual property and patent rights commonly have to agree on a price. Knowing the value of the intellectual property rights is essential to reach such an agreement, but also to make sure the parties are engaging in a good deal.

=== Support in situations of patent conflict or dispute ===
In scenarios of patent conflict, such as patent infringement proceedings or alternative dispute resolution mechanisms, quantification of damages is often a necessary step of the process. The correct valuation of the intellectual property right at stake is therefore essential to guarantee a fair recovery of the damages.

=== Fund raising through bank loans or venture capital ===
Valuation of the intellectual property to be used as security for bank loans or to attract venture capital and investors is essential. Several studies reveal that, in particular, owning patents and a proper intellectual property management play a crucial role in the decision of venture capitalists.

== Methods ==
Different approaches of patent valuation are used by companies and organizations. Generally, these approaches are divided in two categories: the quantitative and qualitative valuation. While the quantitative approach relies on numerical and measurable data with the purpose to calculate the economic value of the intellectual property, the qualitative approach is focused on the analysis of the characteristics and potential uses of the intellectual property, such as the legal, technological, marketing or strategic aspects of the patented technologies. Qualitative valuation deals also with assessing the risks and opportunities associated to the intellectual property of the company.

=== Quantitative approach ===
Several methodologies are used on the quantitative approach, but generally they can be grouped in four methods:

- Cost-based method
- Market-based method
- Income-based method
- Option-based method

==== Cost-based method ====
This method is based on the principle that there is a direct relation between the costs expended in the development of the intellectual property and its economic value. Two different techniques are mainly used to measure costs:

1. Reproduction cost method: Estimations are performed by gathering all costs associated with the purchase or development of a replica of the patent under valuation.
2. Replacement cost method: Estimations are performed on the basis of the costs that would be spent to obtain an equivalent patent asset with similar use or function.

In both methods, present prices are taken into account, i.e. the expenditures as of the valuation date and not the historical costs when these actually happened. For assessing costs, two cost sources of two sorts should be included: direct expenditures, such as costs with materials, labor and management; and opportunity costs, relating to the lost profits due to delays in market entrance or investment opportunities lost with the aim of developing the assets.

==== Income-based method ====
This method is based on the principle that the value of an asset is intrinsic to the expected income flows it generates. After the income is estimated, the result is discounted by an appropriate discount factor with the objective to adjust it to the present circumstances and therefore to determine the net present value of the intellectual property. There are different methods of calculation of the future cash flows, such as:

1. Discounted cash flow method: This method aims to estimate future cash flows, which are projected and after discounted by applying an appropriate discount factor. The main source of information to estimate the cash flows is generally the business plan of the company that exploits or intends to exploit the asset.
2. Relief-from-royalty method: In this method the value of the asset is considered as the value of the royalty payments from which the company is relieved due to its ownership of the asset. Hence, the appropriate royalty rate must be determined, allowing the estimation of the future royalty income stream. A discount rate is applied to determine the present value of the asset.

==== Option-based method ====
Differing relative to the above methods, an option-based methodology takes into consideration the options and opportunities related to the investment. It relies on option pricing models (e.g. Black–Scholes) for stock options to achieve a valuation of a given intellectual property asset. In these cases, patents may be valued using the techniques developed for financial options, as applied via a real options framework. The key parallel is that a patent provides its owner the right to exclude others from using the underlying invention, so both patents and stock options represent a right to exploit an asset in the future, and to exclude others from using it. The patent (option) will have value to the buyer (owner) only to the extent that the expected price in the future exceeds the opportunity cost of earning just as much in a risk-less alternative. Thus patent rights can be thought of as corresponding to a call option and may be valued correspondingly. See Contingent claim valuation, as well as Business valuation § Option pricing approaches, for further discussion.

== See also ==
- Economics and patents
- Intellectual property valuation
- Intangible asset finance
