= Mismarking =

Concept in financial instrument valuation

Mismarking in securities valuation takes place when the value that is assigned to securities does not reflect what the securities are actually worth, due to intentional fraudulent mispricing. Mismarking misleads investors and fund executives about how much the securities in a securities portfolio managed by a trader are worth (the securities' net asset value, or NAV), and thus misrepresents performance. When a trader engages in mismarking, it allows him or her to obtain a higher bonus from his or her employer, where the bonus is calculated by the performance of the securities portfolio managed by the trader.

Mismarking is an element of operational risk. The trader engaging in mismarking is sometimes referred to as a "rogue trader".

During market downturns, determining the value of illiquid securities held in portfolios becomes especially challenging, in part because of the amount of debt associated with these securities and in part because of fewer mechanisms for price discovery. As a result, during such periods illiquid securities are especially susceptible to fraudulent mismarking.

== Notable cases ==
In 2007, two Credit Suisse traders pleaded guilty to mismarking their securities positions to overvalue them by $3 billion, avoid losses, and increase their year-end bonuses. Federal prosecutors and the Securities and Exchange Commission charged that the traders' goal was to obtain lavish year-end bonuses that the mismarking would lead to. The traders engaged in what The New York Times called "a brazen scheme to artificially increase the price of bonds on their books to create fictitious profits." A team of traders, facing an inquiry from Credit Suisse's internal controls Price Testing group, justified their bond portfolio's inflated value by obtaining "independent" marks from other banks' trading desks. The traders secured sham "independent" marks for illiquid securities that they held position in from friends who worked at other financial firms. Their friends generated prices that valued a number of bonds at the prices that the traders requested, which the traders then recorded as the true value of the bonds. The false profits allowed the head of the group to secure a cash bonus of more than $1.7 million and a stock award of more than $5.2 million. The bank was not charged in the case. Credit Suisse's outside auditor discovered the mismarkings during an audit. Credit Suisse took a $2.65 billion write-down after discovering their traders' mismarking.

Also in 2007, the Royal Bank of Canada, Canada's biggest bank, fired several traders in its corporate bond business, after another trader accused them of mismarking bonds the bank held by overpricing them, and marked down the values of the bonds and recognized $13 million of trading losses relating to the bonds. The bank said it investigated the accusations, and took remedial action. The Globe and Mail noted: "traders might have an incentive to boost [the bonds'] prices because it could have an impact on their bonuses."

In 2008, a Bank of Montreal trader pleaded guilty to intentionally mismarking his trading book in order to increase his bonus from the bank.

In 2010, a Merrill Lynch trader in London who mispriced positions he had on behalf of the bank by $100 million to cover up his losses was banned by the United Kingdom's Financial Services Authority (FSA) from working in the securities industry in the UK for at least five years.

Also in 2010, a trader at Toronto Dominion Bank in the UK was fined £750,000 ($1.16 million) by the FSA for intentionally mismarking his trading positions.

In 2016, Citigroup fired a trader for mismarking his portfolio.

Also in 2016, a trader at a company authorized by the Dubai Financial Services Authority (DFSA) was banned for six years from performing any functions in connection with the provision of financial services in the Dubai International Financial Centre after he mismarked his trading book.

In 2019, SEC announced settled charges against a former Citigroup Global Markets Inc. (CGMI) trader for mismarking a book of illiquid credit derivatives while sustaining losses from unauthorized trading in U.S. Treasury securities (USTs).

In 2022, SEC charged James Velissaris, former Chief Investment Officer and founder of Infinity Q Capital Management, with overvaluing assets by more than $1 billion while pocketing tens of millions of dollars in fees.

== Regulatory action ==
=== United States ===
To address mismarking, in 2020 in the United States the Securities and Exchange Commission proposed a new rule, entitled "Good Faith Determinations of Fair Value," intended to address valuation practices and the role of a fund's board of directors with respect to the fair value of securities investments.

== See also ==
- Bond valuation
- Securities fraud
- Valuation control
