= Daniel Bernhofen =

American academic

Daniel Bernhofen is a professor of international economics in the School of International Service at American University.

== Career ==
Bernhofen previously was professor of international economics and director of the Globalisation and Economic Policy Research Centre at the University of Nottingham. Bernhofen's research has included work that uses the opening of Japan to foreign trade in the 19th century to test comparative advantage and international trade theory.

Bernhofen has published articles on the theoretical, empirical and historical aspects of international trade in peer-reviewed journals such as the American Economic Review, the Journal of Political Economy and the Journal of International Economics. He is co-editor of the Palgrave Handbook of International Trade. His research has been funded by the National Science Foundation, the Leverhulme Trust, the British Academy and the Alexander von Humboldt Foundation.

Bernhofen received a PhD in Economics and a Master in Science in Mathematics from the Maxwell School of Citizenship and Public Affairs at Syracuse University, and a Diplom from the University of Ulm.

== Bibliography ==
- Bernhofen, Daniel M. and John C. Brown (2004) ‘A Direct Test of the Theory of Comparative Advantage: The Case of Japan’, Journal of Political Economy 112(1): 48–67.
- Bernhofen, Daniel M. and John C. Brown (2005) ‘An Empirical Assessment of the Comparative Advantage Gains from Trade: Evidence from Japan’, American Economic Review 95(1): 208–25.
- Bernhofen, Daniel M., Zouheir El-Sahli and Richard Kneller (2016) 'Estimating the effects of the container revolution on world trade', Journal of International Economics 98:36-50.
- Bernhofen, Daniel M. and John C. Brown (2016) ‘Testing the General Validity of the Heckscher-Ohlin Theorem’, American Economic Journal: Microeconomics 8(4): 54–90.
