= Special situation =

Term used in business finance

A special situation in finance is an atypical event which has the high potential to alter the future course of a business, materially impacting the company's value. The connotation of the event may be both positive (for example, merger or acquisition) and negative (conflict, distress, etc.) The notion also covers corporate restructuring and corporate transactions, such as spin-offs, share repurchases, security issuance/repurchase, asset sales, or other catalyst-oriented situations. Further, a shareholders conflict is also considered a special situation.

Seeking for and investing in special situations is a strategy pursued by a number of investors. To take advantage of a special situation, a hedge fund manager must identify an upcoming event that will increase or decrease the value of the company's equity and equity-related instruments.

== Definition ==
There is also a definition of special situation by Benjamin Graham:

First, just what is meant by a "special situation"? Convention has not jelled sufficiently to permit a clear-cut and final definition. In the broader sense, a special situation is one in which a particular development is counted upon to yield a satisfactory profit in the security even though the general market does not advance. In the narrow sense, you do not have a real “special situation” unless the particular development is already under way.

== Classes of special situations ==
In his well-known book Security Analysis, Benjamin Graham divides special situations into six classes:

- Class A: Standard arbitrages, based on a reorganization, recapitalization or merger plan
- Class B: Cash payout, in recapitalization or mergers
- Class C: Cash payments on sale or liquidation
- Class D: Litigated matters
- Class E: Public utility breakups
- Class F: Miscellaneous special situations

== See also ==
- Alternative investments
- Bankruptcy
- Default (finance)
- Distressed securities
- Going concern
- Contingent value rights
