= South African Mineral Reporting Codes =

Standards for South African minerals and petroleum industries

The South African Mineral Reporting Codes (SAMCODES) are codified sets of standards and guidelines applicable to the South African Minerals and Petroleum Industries, drafted and overseen by the SAMCODES Standards Committee (SSC), a professional and non-governmental body. Specifically, the standards and guidelines are applicable to public reports compiled on behalf of South African Minerals and Petroleum companies for the benefit of investors. The Codes are incorporated into Section 12 of the Johannesburg Stock Exchange (JSE) Listings Rules, which detail "the criteria for the listing of, and the additional disclosure requirements for Mineral Companies and, in certain circumstances, substantial mineral assets of non-Mineral Companies" in South Africa. As such, the SSC acts in an advisory capacity to the JSE, ensuring that reports submitted for listings consideration are compliant with the SAMCODES.

The Codes set out minimum standards for Public Reporting of Exploration Results, Mineral (or Oil and Gas) Resources and Ore Reserves and their Valuation for listed and non-listed entities, or those companies wishing to list or raise capital for a Minerals or Petroleum Project. Public Reports include, but are not limited to, annual and quarterly company reports, press releases, information memoranda, technical papers, website postings and public presentations. The purpose of the codes is to protect the investment community from misleading information with regards to mineral resources and reserves.

The Codes are principles-based, and are designed to provide investors and potential investors with the minimum, material information for an informed investment decision. Public Reports require sign-off by a duly qualified, experienced and registered professional person, named a "Competent Person" or "Competent Valuator" or "Qualified Reserves Evaluator".

The SAMCODES currently comprise three codes, namely SAMREC: The South African Code for the Reporting of Exploration Results, Mineral Resources and Mineral Reserves (2016); SAMVAL: The South African Code for the Reporting of Mineral Asset Valuation (2016); and SAMOG: The South African Code for the Reporting of Oil and Gas Resources (2015).

== History ==
Following the formation of a committee in 1992 by the GSSA to compile a South African Code for the reporting of mineral resources and mineral reserves, a draft was presented for discussion at the 15th Conference of the Council of Mining and Metallurgical Institutions (CMMI), at Sun City, South Africa in 1994. The CMMI then created an ad-hoc International Definitions Group (later to become the Committee for Mineral Reserves International Reporting Standards (CRIRSCO)) consisting of representatives from mining and metallurgical institutions from Australia, Canada, South Africa, the United Kingdom, and the USA, whose purpose was to "[develop] a set of international standard definitions for the reporting of mineral resources and mineral reserves". In 1997 in Denver, Colorado, the group reached a consensus on the standard definitions (known as the Denver Accord), which are now common to all CRIRSCO aligned codes and have been incorporated into the UN Framework Classification.

In compliance with the Denver Accord, the first version of the SAMREC Code was published in March 2000. A rewrite of the SAMREC Code was proposed in 2004, whilst in 2002 work had begun on the establishment of a code for the valuation of mineral assets (SAMVAL) and in 2005 a decision was made to develop a separate oil and gas code (SAMOG). In 2007 and 2008 respectively, the updated version of the SAMREC Code and the first version of the SAMVAL Code were published, with the input of over one hundred people - including mining-industry professionals, and members of the financial and investment communities - assisting in their creations.

The current versions of the SAMCODES were released during the opening of the JSE on 19 May 2016.

== Description ==
=== SAMREC ===
The code details three main categories for the reporting on mining projects, these are Exploration Results, Mineral Resources, and Mineral Reserves.

When interest is first expressed in the geology of an area, preliminary work is undertaken by Competent Person/s (CP) on the site, the results of which may be of interest to investors and are reported as Exploration Results or Exploration Target, but which should not be considered a declaration of Mineral Resources or Reserves. According to SSC standards, CPs are required to have at least five years of experience relevant to the style of mineralisation, the type of deposit and the activity that is being undertaken.

Once further scientific and engineering investigation has been performed and it can be demonstrated that there are "reasonable prospects for eventual economic extraction", then a Mineral Resource Report can be published or declared. There are three sub-categories of Mineral Resource within the Code, namely Measured, Indicated, and Inferred. These sub-categories indicate levels of geoscientific confidence in the project, from highest (Measured) to lowest (Inferred).

When the economic feasibility of a project has been demonstrated, by taking into account Modifying Factors (i.e. mining, processing, metallurgical, infrastructure, economic, marketing, legal, environmental, social and governmental factors), then a Mineral Reserve can be declared. Mineral Reserves fall under two sub-categories (Proved and Probable). Proved Reserves are derived from Measured Resources and imply a high degree of confidence in the Modifying Factors, whereas Probable Reserves are derived from Indicated Resources and imply a lower degree of confidence in the Modifying Factors.

The current iteration of the code came into effect on 1 January 2017.

=== SAMVAL ===
Whilst the SAMREC and SAMVAL Codes adhere to similar principles, the main difference is that SAMREC focuses on resource-reserve estimation and SAMVAL on their monetary valuation. The code sets forth fundamental principles that a Competent Mineral Assets Valuator (CV) should adhere to when conducting and reporting on a mineral asset valuation. Apart from sharing the fundamental principles of Materiality, Transparency, and Competency with the SAMREC Code, the SAMVAL Code also includes Reasonableness, which was added in its 2016 update. See Valuation (finance) § Valuation of mining projects.

=== SAMOG ===
Drawing from the Canadian Oil and Gas reporting code (National Instrument 51-101) and the Petroleum Resources Management System (PRMS), the SAMOG Code "formalises the standard of reporting on the size of oil and gasfields and reservoirs, as well as items that must be disclosed in public reports". Under the code, proven reserves (P1) are those in which there is 90% certainty of production occurring, and probable reserves (P2) are those in which there is 50% certainty of economic extraction.

== Criticisms ==
While the SAMREC Code requires that a CP should be forthcoming about all aspects associated with a project (including negative ones), a 2014 paper by S.M. Rupprecht highlights the concern that self-regulation is still difficult to enforce. The author lists possible reasons for non-compliance with the code, one being the fact that the viewing of reports are often subject to confidentiality agreements, and another being that practicing CPs are reluctant to make formal complaints against others for actions they may be guilty of themselves.

While professional organisations, such as the GSSA and SAIMM, cannot be held legally liable for the negligence of their members, Rupprecht suggests they could offer coaching and mentoring around the reporting codes to their members so as to improve overall standards, rather than exacting punitive measures on them ("except in special cases where fraud or deception is deliberate").

In an attempt to tackle the issue of non-complaint reporting, the SAMREC Code introduced the 'if not, why not' principle in 2016, "which involves testing statements against a list of questions and, if any question cannot be answered, the competent person (CP) must indicate why not." - Ken Lomberg, SAMREC Committee Chairperson 2017
