= Profit risk =

Risk management tool

Profit risk is a risk management tool that focuses on understanding concentrations within the income statement and assessing the risk associated with those concentrations from a net income perspective.

== Alternate definitions ==
Profit risk is a risk measurement methodology most appropriate for the financial services industry, in that it complements other risk management methodologies commonly used in the financial services industry: credit risk management and asset liability management (ALM). Profit risk is the concentration of the structure of a company's income statement where the income statement lacks income diversification and income variability, so that the income statement's high concentration in a limited number of customer accounts, products, markets, delivery channels, and salespeople puts the company at risk levels that project the company's inability to grow earnings with high potential for future earnings losses. Profit risk can exist even when a company is growing in earnings, which can cause earnings growth to decline when levels of concentration become excessive.

== Description ==
When a company's earnings are derived from a limited number of customer accounts, products, markets, delivery channels (e.g., branches/stores/other delivery points), and/or salespeople, these concentrations result in significant net income risk that can be quantified. A loss of just a handful of customer accounts, a loss of a limited number of products, a loss of a select market, a loss of a small number of delivery channels, and/or a loss of a few salespeople can result in significant net income volatility. At this stage, income loss risk is present and the company has reached a level of profit risk that is unhealthy for sustaining net income. The method for quantifying and assessing this potential income loss risk and the volatility that it creates to the company's income statement is profit risk measurement and management. For financial institutions, profit risk management is similar to the diversification strategies commonly used for investment asset allocations, real estate diversification, and other portfolio risk management techniques.

== Basis ==
The concept of profit risk is loosely akin to the well known "80/20" rule or the Pareto principle, which states that approximately 20% of a company's customers drive 80% of the business. This rule and principle may be appropriate for some industries, but not for the financial services industry. According to Rich Weissman, it is true that this small group of customers dominate the income statement, but the old "80/20" rule no longer applies. "There are real-life examples where financial institutions have seen profit risk ratios as high as 300 percent. Their top 10 percent of customer/member relationships accounted for three times net earnings – a "300/10" rule!"

== Measurement ==
To measure these concentrations and manage profit risk, the most important tools for financial institutions may be their MCIF, CRM, or profitability systems that they use to keep track of their customer/member relationship activities. The data in these systems can be analyzed and grouped to gain insights into profitability contribution of each customer/member, product, market, delivery channels, and salespeople. Reports illustrating the concentrations of net income are used by senior management to show (1) the location of the concentrations in the income statement, (2) the levels of the concentrations, and (3) the predictions for future earning losses to be drawn from the concentrations. Often, these reports examine earnings contributions by deciles (groupings of customers or other units of analysis by 10% increments), illustrating concentrations for each 10% group.

== See also ==
- Asset liability management
- Credit risk
- Pareto principle
- Risk management
- Volume risk
