= Liquid tradable securities =

Easily tradable financial instruments

Liquid tradable securities (or LTS) is a generic phrase for a wide range of financial instruments. It often differentiates financial instruments that are easily tradable (or tradeable) as opposed to those that require the permission of the company or a signed document that registers the transfer of securities between two market participants. Another way to look at it is the difference between how a person buys a fund (collective investment scheme) and how they buy a bond or share.

Liquid tradable securities come in many forms and with a wide variety of acronyms. These include stocks and bonds as well as exchange-traded funds, exchange traded commodities, exchange-traded notes (including certificates), REITs, as well as most OTC securities. Note that these do not include Swaps or repurchase agreement (repos), which are contractual arrangements and as such are not tradable. This is a wider definition than the definition of transferable securities under MiFID.

== LTS advantage over collective investment schemes ==
LTSs offer a significant advantage over collective investment schemes. Collective investment schemes (or CIS or UCIS) come in many legal forms. What is common in each legal form is the existence of a shareholder register; according to the laws of most jurisdictions, an entry in the shareholder register must be accompanied by a signed declaration to invest. Equally, a transfer of shares in a collective investment scheme is usually not allowed without the signed consent of the company. These procedural requirements limit the ability of shareholders to trade their shares. A small subset of collective investment schemes are electronically tradable through stock exchanges (most notably REITs). However, the vast majority of collective investment schemes require these procedural steps.

LTSs on the other hand have no such limitations. They are most commonly represented by dematerialised certificates or immobilisation conditions (according to US IRS definitions). LTSs are held in a global note form and deposited with a central securities depository (CSD). The simplifies the administrative procedures of buying and selling and reduces both the costs of administration for the company and the cost of compliance. The benefit for investors is the ease of trading. Positions can be sold without consent of the company and it is perfectly feasible for active secondary market sales to take place unbeknownst to the company. Many exchanges provide a list of tradable instruments (either in the form of a requirements for listing or as a searchable function).

LTSs simply the compliance requirements of fiduciary trustees and financial advisers as they usually include a standard set of documents (including the form of the global note), an information memorandum or prospectus, and a term sheet. The approval of the CSD is critical to this process; all instruments are verified before the issue of an ISIN number and the creation of the dematerialised security is handled by the CSD. The criteria for acceptance are quite strict. IRS regulations stipulate particular requirements for tradable securities. These generally describe the characteristics necessary for an LTS (according to IRS definitions, at least).
