= ID Finance =

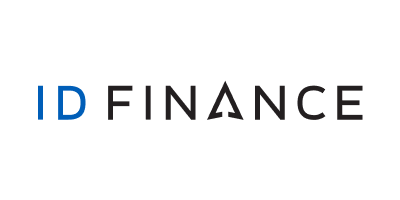
- Type: Private company
- Industry: Financial services
- Founded: 2012; 14 years ago
- Headquarters: Barcelona, Spain
- Key people: Boris Batine (CEO); Alexander Dunaev (COO)
- Number of employees: 380
- Website: idfinance.com

ID Finance is a financial technology company founded in 2012 by Boris Batine and Alexander Dunaev. It is predominantly focused on emerging markets, which are characterized by noncompetitive financial services, limited availability of credit and high barriers to entry.

== Operations ==
ID Finance is headquartered in Barcelona.

It was formally split from its CIS region and Eastern Europe operations (which became IDF Eurasia) in 2018.

The company employs more than 400 people. The company owns the brands MoneyMan (short-term online lending service), AmmoPay (automated POS lending service) and Solva (online service for issuing medium-term loans up to a year). ID Finance operates in the markets of Spain (Moneyman.es, Plazo.es), Kazakhstan, Georgia, Poland, Brazil and Mexico.
