= Earnout =

Form of equity

Earnout, or earn-out, is a pricing structure in mergers and acquisitions in which the sellers must "earn" part of the purchase price based on the performance of the business following the acquisition.

Earnouts are often employed when the buyer(s) and seller(s) disagree about the expected growth and future performance of the target company. A typical earnout takes place over a three- to five-year period after closing of the acquisition and may involve anywhere from ten to fifty percent of the purchase price being deferred over that period. Buyers usually value companies based on historical performance while sellers may weight more heavily projections about higher growth prospects. With an earnout the seller's shareholders are paid an additional sum if some predefined performance targets are met. (See contingent value rights, having a similar function.)

Earnouts are popular among private equity investors, who do not necessarily have the expertise to run a target business after closing, as a way of keeping the previous owners involved following the acquisition.

The terms and conditions of an earnout are largely dependent on which party will actually manage the business following the closing. If the buyer will manage the business, the seller may be concerned with mismanagement by the buyer which causes the company to miss targets. On the other hand, if the seller will manage the business, the buyer may be concerned with the seller either minimizing or understating expenses or overstating revenue so as to manipulate the earnout calculation.

== Performance metrics ==
The financial targets used in an earnout calculation may include revenue, net income, EBITDA or EBIT targets, and the selection of metrics also influences the terms and conditions of the earnout. Sellers tend to prefer revenue as the simplest measurement, but revenue can be boosted through business activities that hurt the bottom line of the company. On the other hand, while buyers tend to prefer net income as the most accurate reflection of overall economic performance, this number can be manipulated downward through extensive capital expenditures and other front-loaded business expenses. Some earnouts may be based on entirely non-financial targets such as the development of a product or the execution of a contract. Other performance metrics may include sales (gross or net), gross profit, operating income (EBIT), operating cash flow (EBITDA), environmental costs, cost savings from synergies, reduction of debt or derivatives of any of these.

== Limitations ==
Earnouts have several fundamental limitations. They generally work best when the business is operated as envisioned at the time of the transaction, and are not conducive to changing the business plan in response to future issues. In some transactions, the buyer may have the ability to block the earnout targets from being met. Outside factors may also impact the company's ability to achieve earnout targets. Because of these limitations, sellers often negotiate earnout terms very carefully.
