= Revealed comparative advantage =

Balassa index in international economics

The revealed comparative advantage (RCA) is an index used in international economics for calculating the relative advantage or disadvantage of a certain country in a certain class of goods or services as evidenced by trade flows. It is based on the Ricardian comparative advantage concept.

It most commonly refers to an index, called the Balassa index, introduced by Béla Balassa (1965). In particular, the revealed comparative advantage of country $c$ in product/commodity/good $p$ is defined by:

$RCA_{cp} = \frac {E_{cp}/\sum_{p' \in P} E_{cp'}} {\sum_{c'\in C} E_{c'p}/\sum_{c'\in C, p'\in P}E_{c'p'}}$, where:

E	Exports
c, c'	Country index
C	Set of countries
p,p'	Commodity index
P	Set of commodities

That is, the RCA is equal to the proportion of the country's exports that are of the class under consideration, $\frac{E_{cp}}{\sum_{p'}E_{cp'}}$, divided by the proportion of world exports that are of that class, $\frac{\sum_{c'} E_{c'p}}{\sum_{c', p'} E_{c'p'}}$.

A comparative advantage is "revealed" if RCA>1. If RCA is less than unity, the country is said to have a comparative disadvantage in the commodity or industry.

The concept of revealed comparative advantage is similar to that of economic base theory, which is the same calculation, but considers employment rather than exports.

Example: in 2010, soybeans represented 0.35% of world trade with exports of $42 billion. Of this total, Brazil exported nearly $11 billion, and since Brazil's total exports for that year were $140 billion, soybeans accounted for 7.9% of Brazil's exports. Because 7.9/0.35 = 22, Brazil exports 22 times its "fair share" of soybean exports, and so we can say that Brazil has a high revealed comparative advantage in soybeans.

== See also ==
- Economic base analysis
