= Nancy Olewiler =

Canadian economist (b. 1948)

Nancy D. Olewiler
- Born: 27 November 1948 (age 77); Cleveland, Ohio, USA
- Citizenship: American and Canadian

Academic background
- Education: Barnard College, Simon Fraser University, University of British Columbia
- Doctoral advisor: George Christopher Archibald

Academic work
- Discipline: Environmental economics
- Institutions: Simon Fraser University

Nancy D. Olewiler (née Nancy Darrah Bennett) is a Canadian economist who is currently a professor at the School of Public Policy at Simon Fraser University. She is affiliated with numerous organizations such as Powertech Labs Inc., BC Hydro, Powerex Corp, TransLink (British Columbia), and the Center for Public Research. Olewiler has received numerous awards for her contributions in the education and environmental economics sector. She was most recently a recipient of the 2017 YWCA Women of Distinction Award for her work at Queen's University and Simon Fraser University. She is also notable for her research in natural resource and environmental policy, the effects of environmental regulation on the economy, and environmental tax policies.

== Early life ==
Born on November 27, 1948, in Cleveland, Ohio Olewiler is a native American citizen. She is now a dual citizen of both Canada and the United States of America.

Olewiler has obtained 3 degrees throughout her career; Bachelors of Arts in Economics at Barnard College, Masters of Arts in Economics at Simon Fraser University, and a Doctoral Degree in Economics at the University of British Columbia.

== Career ==
=== Education ===
Olewiler was the first female professor, from 1976-1990, in the economics department at Queens University in Kingston, Ontario. She taught in their economics department for a number of years before she was later announced as the first female professor to receive tenure. Olewiler has also taught at institutions such as the University of Colorado, University of California, Berkeley, and the University of New South Wales. She later went onto creating the environmental economics field of studies at two Canadian universities; Queens and Simon Fraser University. Along with creating these subjects, Olewiler authored two textbooks for the courses economics of natural resource and environmental economics, both of which are commonly used today. Olewiler arrived at Simon Fraser University in 1990 and has continuously served on the Board of Governors for a number of years. She was the first and thus far, only chair of the Economics department at Simon Fraser University, from 1995-2000. She served in their economics department from 1990-2004. As of 2019, Olewiler continues her work as a professor at the School of Public Policy in Simon Fraser University.

=== School of Public Policy ===
A defining component in Nancy Olewiler’s career is her work as the founding director of the School of Public Policy at the Simon Fraser University. Established in 2003, Olewiler remains the Director. Olewiler was a crucial element in raising recognition of the school and the development of their graduate programs. The Simon Fraser School of Public Policy has been consistently ranked as one of the top school in Canada, outranking other notable Canadian schools such as University of Ottawa and University of Calgary. According to the ranking process done by Macleans, the school was the top school four times out of the previous seven years for the field of public policy. The school consists of graduate programs for a Masters of Public Policy and the Centre for Public Policy Research (CPPR). These programs have a goal of development in public policy analysis as well as planning for public, private and non-governmental organizations. Students that take part in this program receive a solid foundation in economics and political science as well as specialized field courses and capstone research projects. Major employers for graduates from the Masters of Public Policy program include the federal government of Canada, not-for-profit organizations and private-sector firms. Students from this program continuously support communities in public service, specifically in climate change and improvements in public transit.

=== Affiliations ===
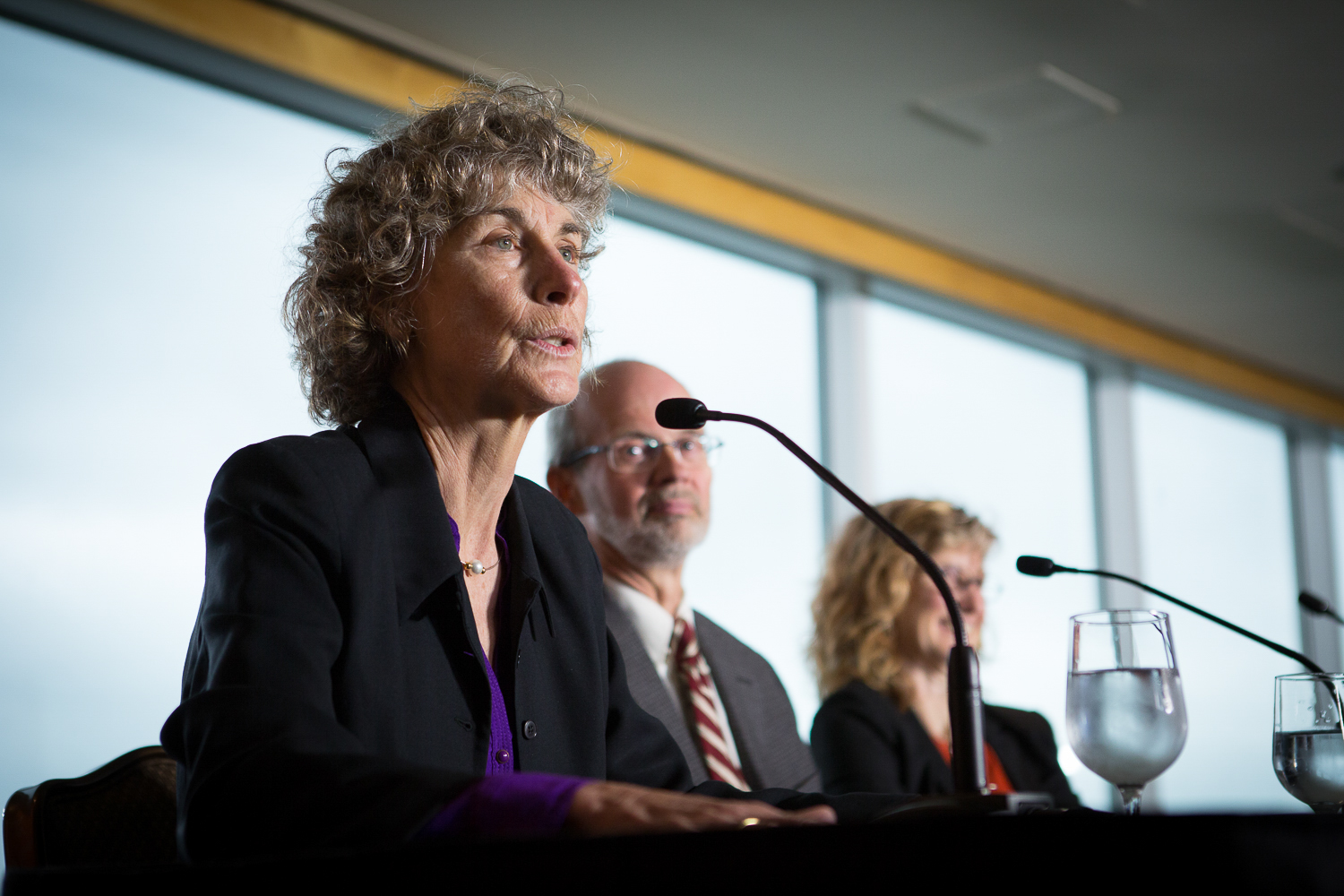
Nancy Olewiler speaking on behalf of the Climate Leadership Team about real climate action

On top of the work Olewiler did in university education system, she served on multiple committees and boards. Olewiler was on the Board of Directors at BC Hydro and Powerex Corp since Sept. 25th, from 2001-2010. She also served on the board at Translink from 2008-2013 as well as held positions as the director of Powertech Labs Inc. and as the managing editor of Canadian Public Policy. As a member of these boards, Olewiler was responsible for overseeing affairs and providing recommendations on the policies that effect the B.C lower mainland.

Olewiler has written a number of reports for the federal and provincial government in Canada regarding issues pertaining to the environment and natural resource. Many of Olewiler's reports on sustainability and federal business tax policies were also used in the Energy Options Task Force, National Roundtable on the Environment and Economy's Ecological Fiscal Reform Program. Olewiler was invited as an expert panelist for GreenPAC, a Canadian environmental organization, for their political endorsement campaigns in 2015, 2016, and 2017. By sharing her expertise, Olewiler was able to contribute to addressing challenging environmental issues and turn them into political concerns that were utilized by GreenPAC to recruit passionate leaders in working toward these challenges.

Olewiler is on the Climate Solution and Clean Growth Advisory Council in British Columbia. This council consists of leaders representing First Nations, environmental organizations, academia, labour and the local government. The purpose of this council is to provide the provincial government with strategic advice and information on the development of the provinces' climate action and clean economic growth. They acknowledge that the road to combating climate change is a steady but committed approach. Actions to drive down emissions and increase economic opportunities are continuously being discussed. Shared principles of this council include respecting indigenous perspectives in all decisions and creating prosperity and jobs.

Olewiler is currently the advisor for the Environment and Economy Program for Southeast Asia(EEPSEA) and Latin American and Caribbean Environmental Economics Program (LACEEP). LACEEP is a capacity building initiative that aims to provide financial support in the form of grants to research specializing in environmental and resource economics in Latin America and the Caribbean. In addition to the grants provided for researchers, supervision, advising, and access to academic resources is also available. Olewiler acts as a supervisor and an educator in energy economics to the researchers in these areas.

=== Research ===
Olewiler has produced numerous academic papers, texts, and policy studies in areas such as taxation, natural resources, and environmental economics. Key areas of research for Olewiler were in natural resource, environmental policy, the effects of environmental regulation on the economy, and environmental tax policy. Her recent studies were done on the effects of economic integration on the environment and impacts of environmental policy on the economy.

== Awards ==
In 2006, Olewiler received the Kreiser Award for Environmental Taxation at the Global Conference on Environmental Taxation (GCET). The GCET is an annual conference that acts as a forum for exchanges in areas of environmental practices and principles.

In 2013, Olewiler received the Dean's Medal for Academic Excellence at Simon Fraser University for her work in their Economics department as well as in the School of Public Policy. This award was to recognize Olewiler's display of excellence in scholarship, teaching and service.

In 2017, Olewiler became a recipient of the 2017 YWCA Women of Distinction Award in the category of Education, Training & Development for her position as the first female professor at Queens and her work with the School of Public Policy at Simon Fraser University. This award acknowledged Olewiler’s influential work in the school, particularly at the School of Public Policy, and the impacts she was able to make provincially as well as nationally.

== Courses taught ==
Course	Graduate	Undergraduate
Environmental Economics	Yes	Yes
Bio-Economics	Yes	Yes
Cost Benefit Analysis	Yes	
Sustainable Development	Yes	
Public Finance	Yes	Yes
Microeconomic Theory		Yes
Macroeconomic Theory		Yes
Introductory Economics		Yes
Mineral Economics	Yes	
Economic and Ecological Systems	Yes	Yes
Introductory Public Policy Analysis	Yes	
Advanced Public Policy Analysis	Yes	
Economic Foundations for Policy Analysis	Yes	
Regulation and Public Policy	Yes	
