= Ocean Tomo =

Intellectual property merchant bank

- Industry: Financial products and services
- Headquarters: Chicago, Illinois, United States
- Key people: James E. Malackowski, Chairman & CEO
- Subsidiaries: Ocean Tomo Asset Management, LLC; Ocean Tomo Capital, LLC; Ocean Tomo Risk Management, LLC; OTI Data Networks, LLC; Patent Marking, LLC
- Website: www.oceantomo.com

Ocean Tomo is an intellectual property merchant bank that provides financial products and services, including expert testimony, valuation, research, ratings, investments, risk management, and transactions. They are headquartered in Chicago, Illinois, USA. They also have offices in Greenwich, San Francisco and Houston. Ocean Tomo is the founder of the Intellectual Property Exchange International (IPXI). Their current Chairman and CEO is James E. Malackowski. In 2022, the global consulting firm J.S. Held acquired Ocean Tomo. Founded in 1974, J.S. Held provides specialized technical and forensic advisory services to a wide range of industries.

== Auctions ==
Ocean Tomo introduced the world's first public auctions of patents, trademarks and copyrights. The auctions have included business method patents and the rights to Jimi Hendrix's music recordings. In 2009, the Ocean Tomo transactions division was acquired by ICAP through a newly created company, ICAP Ocean Tomo, later renamed ICAP Patent Brokerage.
