= Economic base analysis =

Economic base analysis is a theory that posits that activities in an area divide into two categories: basic and nonbasic. Basic industries are those exporting from the region and bringing wealth from outside, while nonbasic (or service) industries support basic industries. Because export-import flows are usually not tracked at sub-national (regional) levels, it is not practical to study industry output and trade flows to and from a region. As an alternative, the concepts of basic and nonbasic are operationalized using employment data. The theory was developed by Robert Murray Haig in his work on the Regional Plan of New York in 1928.

== Application of the analysis ==
The basic industries of a region are identified by comparing employment in the region to national norms. If the national norm for employment in, for example, Egyptian woodwind manufacturing is 5 percent and the region's employment is 8 percent, then 3 percent of the region's woodwind employment is basic. Once basic employment is identified, the outlook for basic employment is investigated sector by sector and projections made sector by sector. In turn, this permits the projection of total employment in the region. Typically the basic/nonbasic employment ratio is about 1:1. Extending by manipulation of data and comparisons, conjectures may be made about population and income. This is a rough, serviceable procedure, and it remains in use today. It has the advantage of being readily operationalized, fiddled with, and understandable.

== Formula ==
The formula for computing location quotients can be written as:

$LQ = \frac{e_i/e}{E_i/E}$

Where:

$e_i =$ Local employment in industry i

$e =$ Total local employment

$E_i =$ Reference area employment in industry i

$E =$ Total reference area employment

It is assumed that the base year is identical in all of the above variables.

== Example and methodology ==
Economic base ideas can be easy to understand, as are measures made of employment. For instance, it is well known that the economy of Seattle, Washington is tied to aircraft manufacturing, that of Detroit, Michigan, to automobiles, and that of Silicon Valley to high-tech manufacturing. When newspapers discuss the closing of military bases, they may say something like: "5,000 jobs at the base will be lost. That's going to hit the economy hard because it means a loss of 10,000 jobs in the community."

To forecast, the main procedure is to compare the region with the nation and national trends. If the economic base of a region is in industries that are declining nationwide, then the region faces a problem. If its economic base is concentrated in sectors that are growing, then it is in good shape.

Methodologically, economic base analysis views the region as if it were a small nation and uses notions of relative and comparative advantage from international trade theory (Charles Tiebout 1963). In a sense, the activity is macroeconomics "written small", and it has not been of much interest to urban economists in recent years because it does not get at within-city relationships. The analysis usually takes US growth patterns as a given. The fates of regions are determined by trends in the national economy.

== Assumptions ==
As H. Craig Davis points out, there are a number of assumptions on which economic base analysis is conducted. These include (1) that exports are the sole source of economic growth (investment, government spending, and household consumption are ignored); (2) that the export industry is homogeneous (i.e., that an increase or decrease of one export does not affect another); (3) the constancy of the export/service ratio; (4) that there is no inter-regional feedback; and (5) that there is a pool of underutilized resources.

== See also ==
- Revealed comparative advantage
