= Gains from trade =

Net benefits to economic agents

In economics, gains from trade are the net benefits to economic agents from being allowed an increase in voluntary trading with each other. In technical terms, they are the increase of consumer surplus plus producer surplus from lower tariffs or otherwise liberalizing trade.

== Dynamics ==
Gains from trade are commonly described as resulting from:

- specialization in production from division of labor, economies of scale, scope, and agglomeration and relative availability of factor resources in types of output by farms, businesses, location and economies
- a resulting increase in total output possibilities
- trade through markets from sale of one type of output for other, more highly valued goods.

Market incentives, such as reflected in prices of outputs and inputs, are theorized to attract factors of production, including labor, into activities according to comparative advantage, that is, for which they each have a low opportunity cost. The factor owners then use their increased income from such specialization to buy more-valued goods of which they would otherwise be high-cost producers, hence their gains from trade. The concept may be applied to an entire economy for the alternatives of autarky (no trade) or trade. A measure of total gains from trade is the sum of consumer surplus and producer profits or, more roughly, the increased output from specialization in production with resulting trade. Gains from trade may also refer to net benefits to a country from lowering barriers to trade such as tariffs on imports.

David Ricardo in 1817 first clearly stated and proved the principle of comparative advantage, termed a "fundamental analytical explanation" for the source of gains from trade. But from publication of Adam Smith's The Wealth of Nations in 1776, it was widely argued, that, with competition and absent market distortions, such gains are positive in moving toward free trade and away from autarky or prohibitively high import tariffs. Rigorous early contemporary statements of the conditions under which this proposition holds are found in Samuelson in 1939 and 1962. For the analytically tractable general case of Arrow-Debreu goods, formal proofs came in 1972 for determining the condition of no losers in moving from autarky toward free trade.

The proof does not state that no involvement is the best economic outcome. Rather, a large economy might be able to set taxes and subsidies to its benefit at the expense of other economies. Later results of Kemp and others showed that in an Arrow-Debreu world with a system of lump-sum compensatory mechanisms, corresponding to a customs union for a given subset set of countries (described by free trade among a group of economies and a common set of tariffs), there is a common set of world tariffs such that no country would be worse off than in the smaller customs union. The suggestion is that if a customs union has advantages for an economy, there is a worldwide customs union that is at least as good for each country in the world.

== See also ==
- Comparative advantage
- Doux commerce
- Free trade
- Terms of trade
- Trade
