= Bobo Karlsson =

Swedish journalist and author

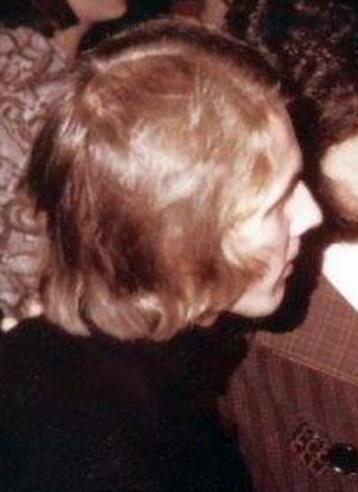
1970 profile snapshot of Karlsson in Stockholm

Bobo Karlsson (30 December 1946 – 7 March 2017) was a Swedish journalist and author.

Karlsson was born in Karlstad. He created the magazine City in 1978, and worked as a journalist for Dagens Nyheter, Svenska Dagbladet and Göteborgs-Posten. Karlsson also published the books New York, New York: En guide till 80-talets metropolis (1981) and Drömmen om Kalifornien: Los Angeles, San Francisco & Las Vegas (1984) both by Prisma publishers. He would later also publish the books Urban Safari: 12 storstäder and Urban Safari 2: 12 nya storstäder.

Karlsson resided his later years in Brazil and died 7 March 2017 in Stockholm, Sweden.
