= Per Ahlmark =

Swedish politician and writer

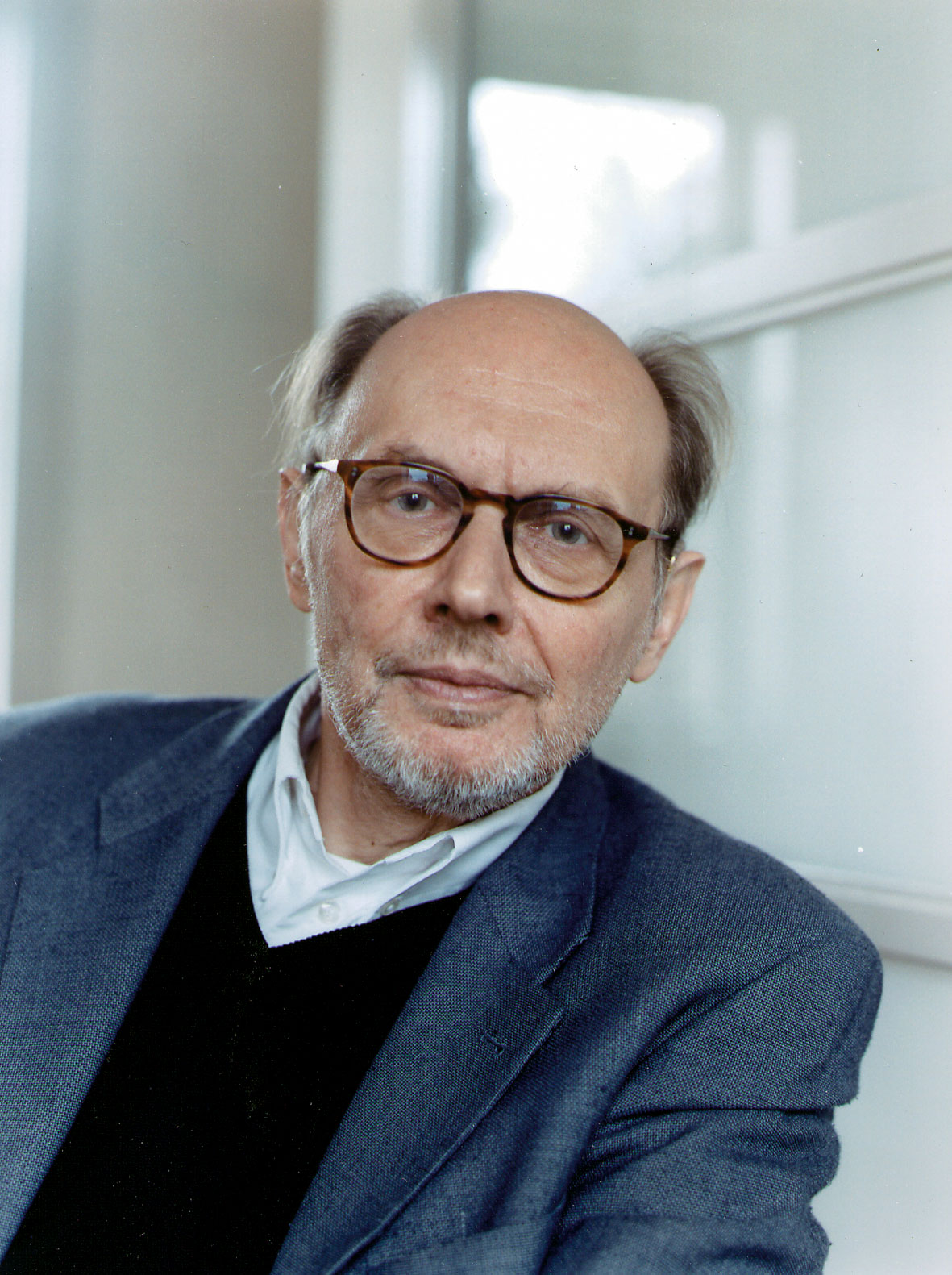
- Ahlmark in 2005

Minister for Employment
- In office 8 October 1976 – 7 March 1978
- Monarch: Carl XVI Gustaf
- Prime Minister: Thorbjörn Fälldin
- Preceded by: Ingemund Bengtsson
- Succeeded by: Rolf Wirtén

Deputy Prime Minister of Sweden
- In office 8 October 1976 – 7 March 1978
- Monarch: Carl XVI Gustaf
- Prime Minister: Thorbjörn Fälldin
- Preceded by: Office established
- Succeeded by: Ola Ullsten

Personal details
- Born: Per Axel Ahlmark; 15 January 1939 Stockholm, Sweden
- Died: 8 June 2018 (aged 79) Stockholm, Sweden
- Resting place: Katarina Church
- Party: Liberal People's Party
- Spouse: Bibi Andersson (m. 1978; div. 1981)
- Education: Stockholm University
- Occupation: Politician

Per Axel Ahlmark (15 January 1939 – 8 June 2018) was a Swedish politician and writer. He was the leader of the Liberal People's Party from 1975 to 1978, and Minister for Employment and Deputy Prime Minister in the Swedish government from 1976 to 1978. He also served as a member of the Swedish parliament from 1967 to 1978.

== Early life and education ==
Ahlmark was born in Stockholm, Sweden, as the son of the professor in medicine Axel Ahlmark and the dentist Gunvor Berglund. He completed upper secondary education at Södra Latin in Stockholm and earned a BA in political science from Stockholm University in 1964.

== Political career ==
Ahlmark joined the Liberal Youth of Sweden in 1960 and was elected chairman of the organization the same year. He served as chairman of the Liberal Youth until 1962 and as a member of the board of the Liberal People's Party from 1960 to 1978. He was elected a member of the upper house of the Swedish parliament from 1967 to 1969 (representing the constituency of Örebro County) and as a member of the lower house from 1969 to 1970 (representing the constituency of Stockholm Municipality). Following the unicameral reform in Sweden in 1970–1971, Ahlmark served as a member of the unicameral parliament until 1978. He also served as a member of the Council of Europe from 1971 to 1976, and as deputy chairman of the Martin Luther King Fund from 1968 to 1973.

On 7 November 1975, Ahlmark succeeded Gunnar Helén as leader of the Liberal People's Party. from 1975 to 1978. From 1976 to 1978, in the first non-socialist government in Sweden in forty years, Ahlmark served as Minister for Employment and Deputy Prime Minister. On 7 March 1978, Ahlmark retired from party politics for personal reasons. From 1978 to 1981 he served as chairman of the board of the Swedish Film Institute.

== Writings and political views ==
Ahlmark published several political books and many hundreds of articles about politics, literature and international conflicts. During the 1980s he published three books of poetry, one novel and two books of essays. He was a columnist for Expressen, then the largest daily newspaper in Scandinavia, from 1961 to 1995. From 1997 to 2018 he was a columnist for Dagens Nyheter, the largest Swedish morning paper, and a contributor to Göteborgs-Posten. In his writings he accuses the political left in Sweden of being uncritical towards the totalitarian communist regimes especially after 1968.

He was a strong supporter of the state of Israel. From 1970 to 1997 he served as deputy chairman of the Sweden–Israel Friendship Association. He co-founded the Swedish Committee Against Antisemitism in 1983 and served as its deputy chairman until 1995. In 1997 he founded the Sweden–Taiwan Friendship Association.

Ahlmark served as an advisor to the Elie Wiesel Foundation for Humanity since 1987, and was a member of board of the Geneva-based NGO UN Watch since 1993.

In 1994, Ahlmark published the widely debated book Vänstern och tyranniet ("Tyranny and the Left"), which is the major work on Swedish fellow travellers and political pilgrims during the last thirty years. This book triggered one of the most heated discussions in recent decades in Sweden about freedom and its enemies. His next work, Det öppna såret ("The Open Wound"), makes a summary of new research regarding democracy and dictatorship respectively in terms of war, genocide/mass murder, and famine. His last book in the same field was Det är demokratin, dumbom! ("It's the Democracy, Stupid!"), published in 2004.

Ahlmark supported the U.S.-led 2003 invasion of Iraq, and was extremely critical of Hans Blix (who is also a prominent member of the Swedish Liberal People's Party and served as Ahlmark's deputy chairman in the Liberal Youth of Sweden). In an article in The Washington Times, Ahlmark described Blix as politically "weak and easily fooled" and a "wimp".

In February 2006, Ahlmark wrote in the Wall Street Journal that he had officially nominated former U.S. undersecretary of state John Bolton and American investigative reporter Kenneth R. Timmerman for the Nobel Peace Prize. Calling them "the good guys" for having exposed Iran's nuclear weapons program and worked to curtail it, he again criticized his former deputy Hans Blix and the IAEA for having been "duped for 18 years" by Iran.

== The Per Ahlmark Foundation ==
On account of Ahlmark's 70th birthday in 2009, a new foundation called The Per Ahlmark Foundation was established in October 2008 by the Jewish assembly in Stockholm. The stated purpose of the foundation is to "promote scientific research and education in political science, the history of ideas and Jewish history, as well as in economics, all with particular focus on issues concerning democracy and human rights". The foundation is chaired by the Swedish businessman Robert Weil and honorary chairman is the rabbi Michael Melchior.

== Personal life ==
Ahlmark was first married to the journalist Lillemor Melsted in 1965. From 1978 to 1981 he was married to the actress Bibi Andersson.

Ahlmark died on 8 June 2018 at the age of 79.

== Honors and awards ==
- Defender of Jerusalem Award, Jabotinsky Foundation, 1986 (co-recipients: Luis Alberto Monge, Eliahu Essas)
- Honorary fellow, Hebrew University of Jerusalem, 1992
- Dialogue Award, Norwegian Jews, 1996
- Honorary Medal, Danish Raoul Wallenberg Society, 1998
- Torgny Segerstedt Award, Sweden–Israel Friendship Association, 1999
- Honorary doctor, Hebrew College, Boston, 2000
- Order of Brilliant Star, Government of Taiwan, 2000
- Honorary doctor, Hebrew University of Jerusalem, 2002 (co-recipients: Umberto Eco, Steven Spielberg)
- Bertil Ohlin Medal, Liberal Youth of Sweden, 2004
- Jan Karski Award, American Jewish Committee, 2004

== Bibliography ==
- Ahlmark, Per (1964). Vår fattiga politik. Stockholm: Bonnier.
- Ahlmark, Per (1965). Den svenska atomvapendebatten. Stockholm: Aldus/Bonnier.
- Ahlmark, Per; Hammarberg, Thomas; Klein, Ernst (1970). Det hatade Israel. Stockholm: PAN/Norstedt.
- Ahlmark, Per (1971). Sveket mot kusterna : om supertankers, oljeskydd, Östersjön, Brofjorden och riksplanering. Stockholm: Aldus/Bonnier.
- Ahlmark, Per (1982). Överleva : dikter. Stockholm: Bonnier. ISBN 91-0-045472-9.
- Ahlmark, Per (1983). Visum : dikter. Stockholm: Bonnier. ISBN 91-0-045896-1.
- Ahlmark, Per; Gustafsson, Lars (1985). Frihet och fruktan : 22 brev. Stockholm: Bonnier. ISBN 91-0-046413-9.
- Ahlmark, Per (1985). Flykter : dikter. Stockholm: Bonnier. ISBN 91-0-046717-0.
- Ahlmark, Per (1989). Zonen : roman. Stockholm: Bonnier. ISBN 91-0-047734-6.
- Ahlmark, Per (1991). Vänsterns moraliska skuld. Stockholm: Timbro. ISBN 91-7566-232-9.
- Ahlmark, Per; Klein, Georg (1991). Motståndet : arton brev om död och liv. Stockholm: Timbro. ISBN 91-0-055206-2.
- Ahlmark, Per; Tingsten, Herbert (1992). Tyranniet begär förtroende. Stockholm: Ratio. ISBN 91-7568-029-7.
- Ahlmark, Per (1993). Det eviga hatet : om nynazism, antisemitism och Radio Islam. Stockholm: Bonnier. ISBN 91-0-055626-2.
- Ahlmark, Per (1994). Vänstern och tyranniet : det galna kvartsseklet. Stockholm: Timbro. ISBN 91-7566-274-4.
- Ahlmark, Per (1996). Malmberg, Fredrik (ed.). Den nya ofriheten : ska diktaturerna pina oss också under nästa sekel?. Stockholm: Ekerlid. ISBN 91-88594-56-4.
- Ahlmark, Per (1997). Det öppna såret : om massmord och medlöperi. Stockholm: Timbro. ISBN 91-7566-326-0.
- Ahlmark, Per (2004). Det är demokratin, dumbom!. Stockholm: Timbro. ISBN 91-7566-548-4.
- Ahlmark, Per (2011). Gör inga dumheter medan jag är död! : memoarer. Stockholm: Atlantis. ISBN 978-91-7353-470-3.

Party political offices
Preceded by Göran C.-O. Claesson	Leader of the Liberal Youth of Sweden; 1960–1962	Succeeded by Ola Ullsten
Preceded by Gunnar Helén	Leader of the Liberal People's Party; 1975–1978	Succeeded by Ola Ullsten
Political offices
Preceded by Ingemund Bengtsson	Minister for Employment; 1976–1978	Succeeded by Rolf Wirtén
Preceded by Gunnar Sträng	Deputy Prime Minister; 1976–1978	Succeeded by Ola Ullsten
