= Sundsvalls Tidning =

Local morning newspaper published in Sweden

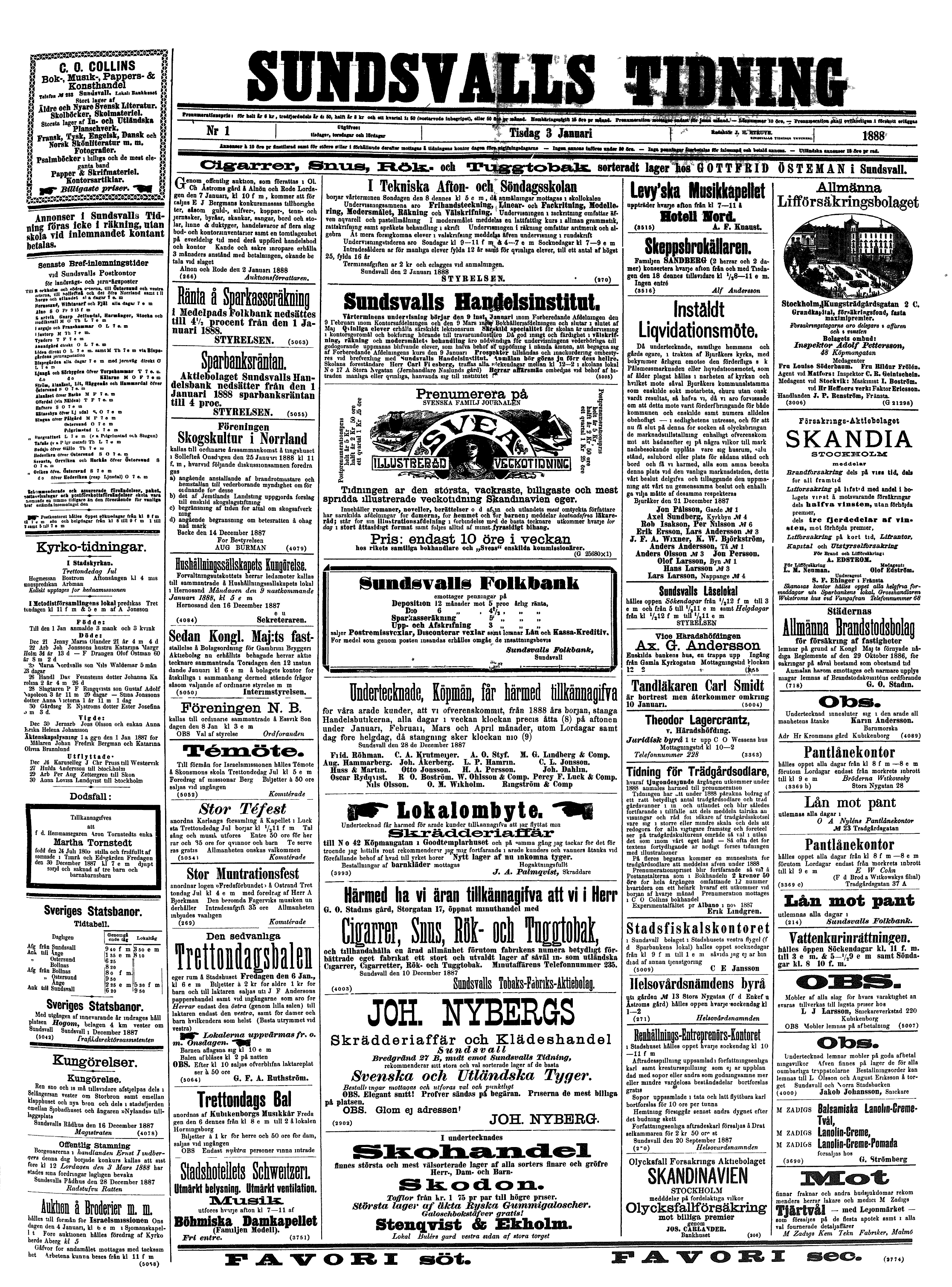
- Front page dated 3 January 1988
- Type: Daily newspaper
- Format: Tabloid
- Owner: MittMedia
- Founded: 1841; 185 years ago
- Political alignment: Liberal
- Language: Swedish
- Headquarters: Sundsvall
- Country: Sweden
- ISSN: 1104-005X
- Website: Sundsvalls Tidning

Sundsvalls Tidning is a local morning newspaper published in Sundsvall, Sweden. It has been in circulation since 1841.

== History and profile ==
Sundsvalls Tidning was first published in January 1841 with eight pages. The paper is based in Sundsvall and is a local morning publication. The owner of the paper was a family company with the same name until 1985 when it was acquired by the Gefle Dagblad company which has a liberal stance. In 1994 the Gefle Dagblad company became the sole owner of the paper.

The company evolved to MittMedia and owns seventeen newspapers, including Sundsvalls Tidning which has a liberal leaning.

In 2003, Sundsvalls Tidning acquired its local competitor, Dagbladet Nya Samhället.

Sundsvalls Tidning was printed in broadsheet format until Spring 2005 when it switched to tabloid. The paper has a website, which is updated twice daily, and a tablet e-paper. In May 2013, the paper began to use the duplex serif and sans typefaces designed by Berton Hasbe.

The paper sold 29,600 copies in 2010. The circulation of Sundsvalls Tidning was 27,300 copies in 2012 and 25,400 copies in 2013.
