= Puss (magazine) =

Satirical magazine in Sweden (1968–1974)

- Categories: Satirical magazine
- Founded: 1968
- First issue: January 1968
- Final issue Number: Autumn 1974; 24
- Country: Sweden
- Based in: Stockholm
- Language: Swedish

Puss, stylized as PUSS, (Swedish: Kiss) was a leftist underground satirical and arts magazine which was published in the period between 1968 and 1974 in Stockholm, Sweden.

== History and profile ==
Puss was launched by a group of Swedish artists led by Lars Hillersberg in Stockholm in January 1968. The magazine adopted a critical approach towards politicians and opinion leaders and condemned the US interventions in Vietnam and the Swedish police. It was also involved in the emerging feminist discussions in Sweden. Major contributors were Lars Norén, Marie-Louise Ekman, Carl Johan De Geer, Lars Forssell, and Öyvind Fahlström. The issues 1 through 21 were published in A4 format. The remaining issues came out in tabloid format. The frequency of Puss was regular in the early years, but became irregular later. The magazine had 24 pages throughout its lifetime. The editor of the magazine frequently changed and included the following: Lars Hillersberg, Åke Holmqvist, Karin Frostensson, Carl Johan De Geer, Leif Katz, Karl Erik Liljeros, Ulf Rahmberg, Lena Svedberg and Christer Themptander. The magazine sold nearly 10,000 copies.

The magazine frequently employed the political satire containing a covert and aesthetic critique. In the third issue Puss published a photo collage made by Lars Hillersberg featuring a naked man wearing a mask of the People's Party leader Sven Wedén. Following its publication the issue was confiscated by the Swedish authorities, and it became a subject of criticisms by mainstream publications such as Aftonbladet and Svenska Dagbladet. Right-wing leader Gösta Bohman also attacked the magazine describing it as a "disgusting" publication. Puss folded in Autumn 1974 after producing a total of 24 issues.
