= Lena Svedberg =

Swedish artist (1946–1972)

- Born: 26 April 1946; Gothenburg
- Died: 1 July 1972 (aged 26)
- Occupation: artist

Aina-Lena Bernice "Lena" Svedberg (26 April 1946 – 2 July 1972) was a Swedish artist.

Svedberg was born in Gothenburg, Sweden. She grew up in Addis Ababa, Ethiopia, where her father worked as an economical advisor for the government.

She went to the Royal Institute of Art in Stockholm in the 1960s. She worked and collaborated with artists in such as Carl Johan De Geer and Lars Hillersberg for the underground, anarchistic art magazine Puss.

Her drawings and paintings are described as mysterious and a bit bizarre. She would often portrait African children with large, begging eyes. Also politicians in a satirical and critical way. She had very negative views on the society of consumption and power.

During her short lifespan she used drugs, and suffered from several illnesses. She committed suicide through jumping from a window of her Stockholm apartment on the fifth floor the summer of 1972.
