= Marie-Louise Ekman =

Swedish painter and film director

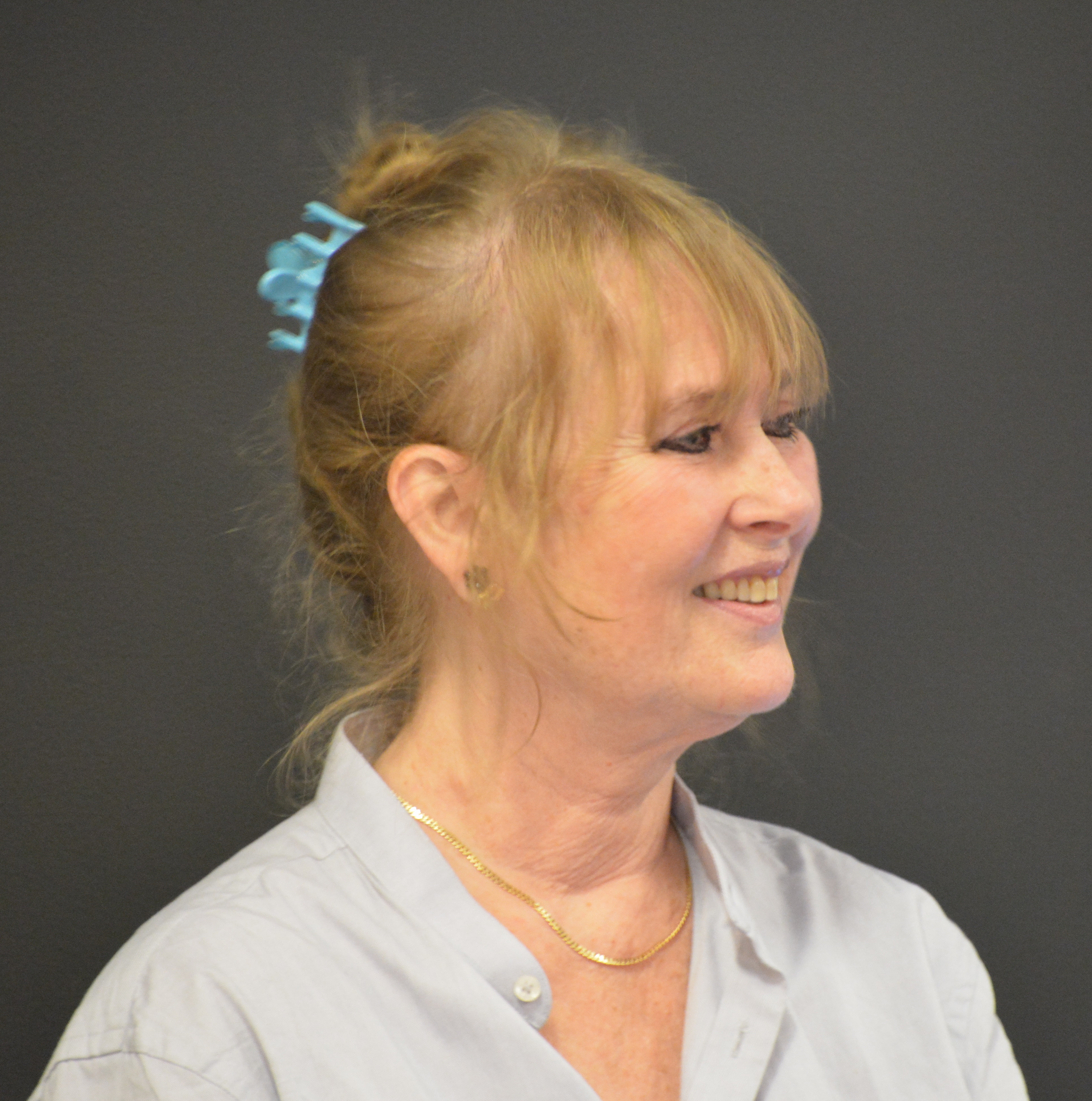
- Marie-Louise Ekman in 2015.
- Born: Marie-Louise Ester Maude Fuchs; 5 November 1944 (age 81); Stockholm, Sweden
- Other names: Marie-Louise De Geer; Marie Louise De Geer Bergenstråhle
- Occupations: Painter, film director
- Spouses: Carl Johan De Geer (m. 1966; div. 1971) Johan Bergenstråhle (m. 1971; div. 1980) Gösta Ekman (m. 1989; died 2017)
- Children: 2
- Parent(s): Walter Fuchs; Maude Lönnqvist

Marie-Louise Ester Maude Ekman, née Fuchs, and known during her first marriage under the surname De Geer, and during and after her second as De Geer Bergenstråhle (born 5 November 1944) is a Swedish painter and film director. She is a professor of art and former rector at the Royal University College of Fine Arts, Stockholm.

During the late 1960s and early 1970s she was among the contributors of a satirical magazine, Puss, in Stockholm. In 1991 at the 26th Guldbagge Awards she won the Creative Achievement award and in 2007 was awarded the prestigious Prince Eugen Medal.

Since 2009 Ekman has been Managing Director of the Royal Dramatic Theatre, Sweden's national stage.

She was married three times. From 1966 to 1971 she was married to the artist Carl Johan De Geer. She was then married to the director and writer Johan Bergenstråhle (with whom she had two daughters, Johanna and Lovisa) from 1971 to 1980. She was married thirdly to actor and stage director Gösta Ekman from 1989 until his death in 2017.

She is known for the films Barnförbjudet (1979), Puder (2001) and Nu är pappa trött igen (1996), all three of which were both written and directed by her.

== Filmography ==
- 1976 - Hallo Baby
- 1977 - Mamma, pappa, barn
- 1979 - Barnförbjudet
- 1983 - Moderna människor
- 1985 - Stilleben
- 1990 - Den hemliga vännen
- 1991 - Duo Jag (TV-series)
- 1992 - Vennerman & Winge (TV-series)
- 1996 - Nu är pappa trött igen
- 2001 - Puder
- 2005 - Asta Nilssons sällskap
