= 1968 Swedish general election =

- 15 September 1968

All 233 seats in the Andra kammaren of the Riksdag 117 seats needed for a majority
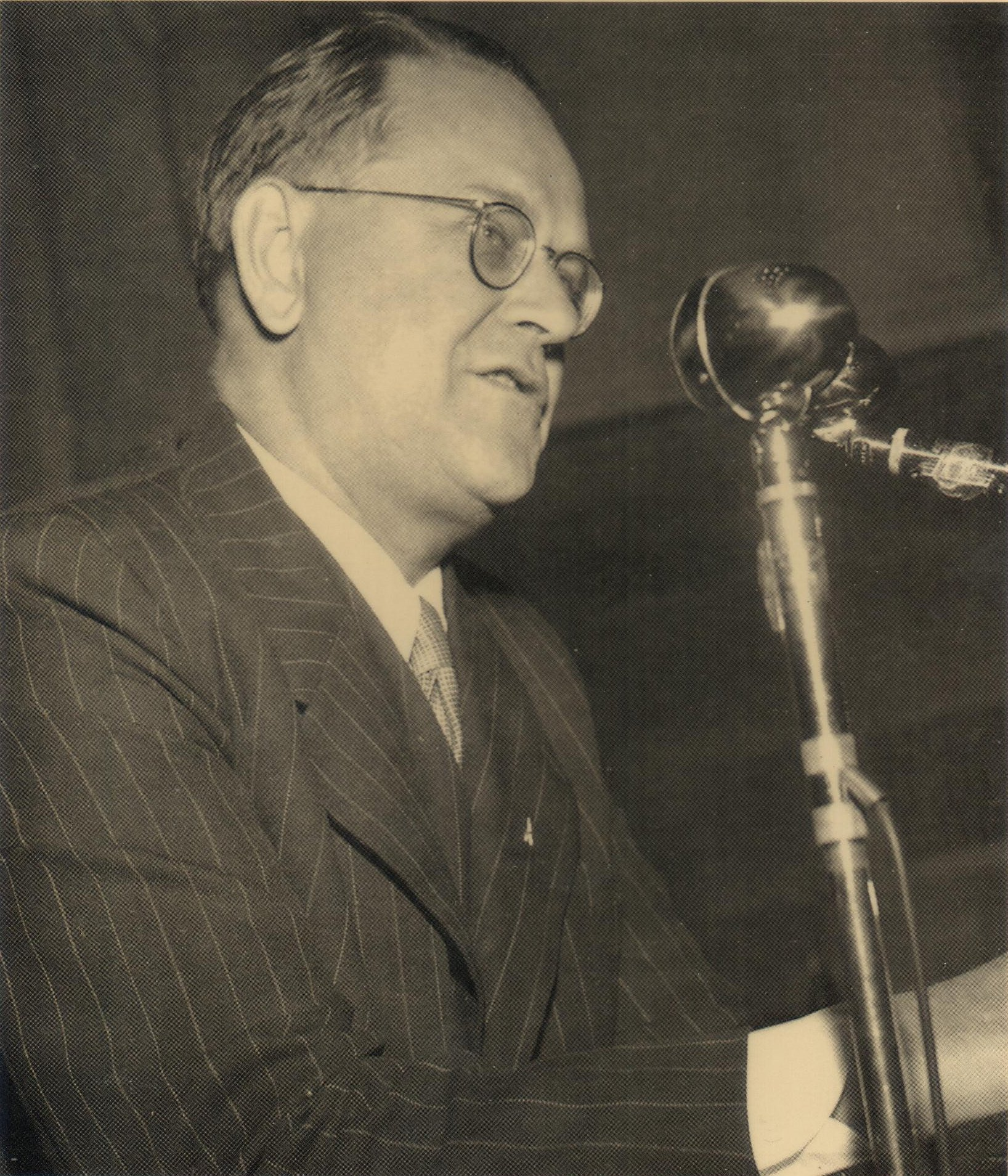

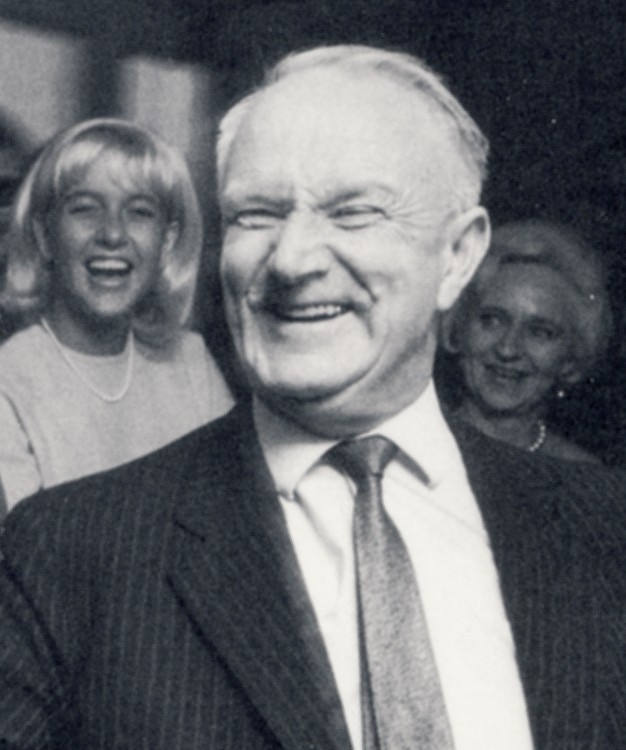

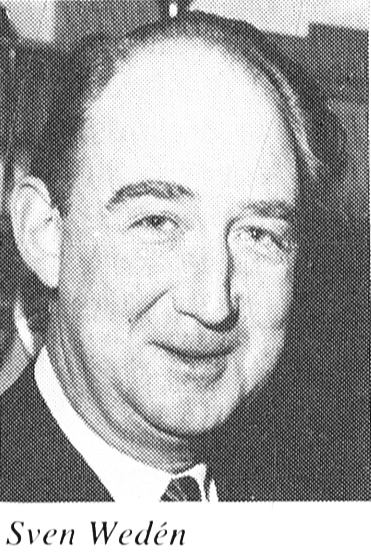

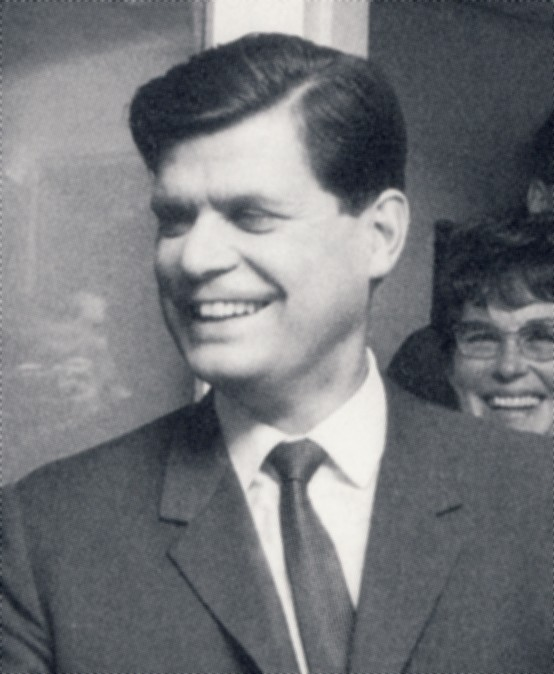

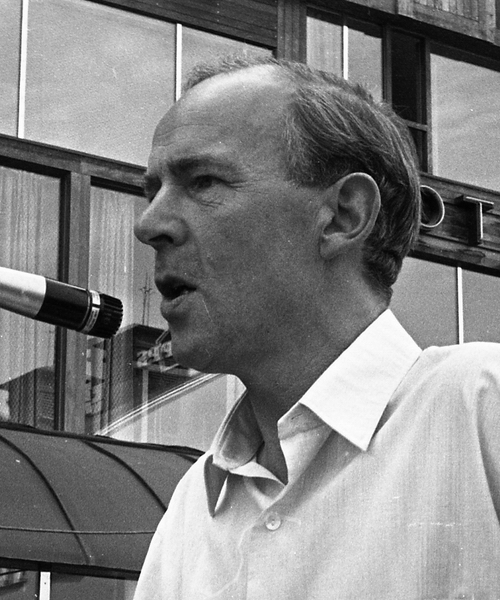
	First party	Second party	Third party
Leader	Tage Erlander	Gunnar Hedlund	Sven Wedén
Party	Social Democrats	Centre	People's Party
Last election	113	36	43
Seats won	125	39	34
Seat change	▲12	▲3	▼9
Popular vote	2,420,242	778,810	688,456
Percentage	50.12%	15.68%	14.26%
Swing	▲2.85 pp	▲2.50 pp	▼2.72 pp
	Fourth party	Fifth party
Leader	Yngve Holmberg	C.-H. Hermansson
Party	Right	Left Communists
Last election	33	8
Seats won	32	3
Seat change	▼1	▼5
Popular vote	621,031	145,172
Percentage	12.86%	3.01%
Swing	▼0.86 pp	▼2.21 pp
- Largest bloc and seats won by constituency
PM before election
Tage Erlander
Social Democrats
Elected PM
Tage Erlander
Social Democrats

General elections were held in Sweden on 15 September 1968. Held in the wake of the crushing of the Prague Spring, it resulted in a landslide victory for the Social Democratic government and Prime Minister Tage Erlander. It is one of two general elections in Swedish history where a single party received more than half of the vote (the other being the election of 1940). Erlander would resign the following year after an uninterrupted tenure of 23 years as head of government.

The Social Democrats had held the office of Prime Minister since 1932 except a three-month "holiday cabinet" in 1936. This was due to the Social Democrats' absolute majority in the upper house of the Swedish parliament, the First Chamber, and a steady majority for them in general elections and also at large in municipality and county council elections. The latter gave them the majority in the upper house, the First Chamber. When they did not have an absolute majority, the Social Democrats could rely on a passive support from the Communists as the Social Democrats almost always nearly had half of the seats. The two socialist parties in the Riksdag did not however win a majority in the general elections of 1952 and 1956.

== Results ==
Party	Votes	%	Seats	+/–
Swedish Social Democratic Party	2,420,277	50.12	125	+12
Centre Party	757,215	15.68	39	+3
People's Party	688,456	14.26	34	–9
Right Party	621,031	12.86	32	–1
Left Party Communists	145,172	3.01	3	–5
Civic Unity (Note: Joint list of the three right-wing parties in Malmö.)	82,082	1.70	–	–
Christian Democratic Unity	72,377	1.50	0	0
Middle Parties (Note: Coalition of the Centre Party and People's Party that contested some constituencies.)	41,307	0.86	–	–
Other parties	1,462	0.03	0	0
Total	4,829,379	100.00	233	0
Valid votes	4,829,379	99.33		
Invalid/blank votes	32,522	0.67		
Total votes	4,861,901	100.00		
Registered voters/turnout	5,445,333	89.29		
Source: Nohlen & Stöver
