= Stampen Group =

Swedish media group

Stampen AB
- Industry: Media group
- Founded: 2005 in Gothenburg, Sweden
- Headquarters: Gothenburg, Sweden
- Products: Newspapers, printing, online communities
- Revenue: 5,100 M SEK (2008)
- Number of employees: 7,000 (2009)
- Website: stampen.com

The Stampen Group is a Swedish media group and one of Sweden's biggest newspaper owners. The main businesses are local newspapers, of which the largest is Göteborgs-Posten. It was founded in 2005. The Stampen Group owns a total of 23 Swedish newspapers, 35 free local weeklies, the printing group V-TAB and distribution companies. The Stampen Media Partner is a business area in the Stampen Group with several large Swedish online communities and mobile marketing agency Mobiento. mktmedia is a development company within the group, developing common platforms for web publishing and mobile marketing for 47 Swedish newspaper titles.

== Owners ==
- Peter Hjörne and family: (65% stake, 74% voting rights)
- Marika Cobbold and family: (14% stake, 13% voting rights)
- Sven Nordgren and family: (14% stake, 11% voting rights)
- Other: (7% stake, 2% voting rights)

== Business areas ==
- Göteborgs-Posten
- Promedia
- Mediabolaget Västkusten
- GISAB
- V-TAB
- Stampen Media Partner
