= Liberalism and centrism in Sweden =

This article gives an overview of liberalism and centrism in Sweden. It is limited to liberal and centrist parties with substantial support, mainly proved by having had a representation in parliament. The sign ⇒ denotes another party in that scheme. For inclusion in this article it is not necessary for parties to have labelled themselves as a liberal party.

== Background ==
Liberalism has been a major force in Sweden since the 19th century. And even before then, personalities like Anders Chydenius (1729 – 1803), promoted the ideals of liberalism. Nowadays The Liberals (Liberalerna, member of LI and ALDE) calls itself a centre-right liberal party. The Centre Party (Centerpartiet, member of LI and ALDE) is a historically agrarian party that has gradually developed into a liberal party. Since their party congress in 2013, they define themselves as a green, liberal party.

== History ==
=== From People's Party to The Liberals ===
- 1895: The liberal wing of the Old Party of the Gentry (Gamla Lantmannapartiet) seceded and formed the People's Party (Folkpartiet)
- 1900: The liberals are reorganised into the Liberal Coalition Party/Freeminded National Association (Liberala Samlingspartiet/Frisinnade Landsföreningen)
- 1922: The party fell apart into the Freeminded People's Party/Freeminded National Association (Frisinnade Folkpartiet/Frisinnade Landsföreningen) and the ⇒ Liberal Party of Sweden
- 1934: Both parties re-united into the People's Party (Folkpartiet)
- 1990: The party is renamed People's Party - The Liberals (Folkpartiet Liberalerna)
- 2015: The party shortened its name to The Liberals (Liberalerna).

=== Liberal Party ===
- 1922: The Liberal Coalition Party fell apart into the ⇒ Freeminded People's Party and the Liberal Party of Sweden (Sveriges Liberala Parti)
- 1934: Both parties re-united into the ⇒ People's Party

=== Centre Party ===
- 1958: The agrarian Rural Party - Farmers' League (Landbygdspartiet Bondeförbundet) renamed itself into Centre Party (Centerpartiet) and evolved gradually from an agrarian into a more liberal direction.

== Liberal leaders ==
- Freeminded National Association: Karl Staaff - Nils Edén - Carl Gustaf Ekman - Felix Hamrin
- Folkpartiet/Liberalerna: Bertil Ohlin - Gunnar Helén - Per Ahlmark - Ola Ullsten - Bengt Westerberg - Maria Leissner - Lars Leijonborg - Jan Björklund - Nyamko Sabuni - Johan Pehrson - Simona Mohamsson
- Centerpartiet: Thorbjörn Fälldin - Maud Olofsson - Annie Lööf - Muharrem Demirok - Anna-Karin Hatt - Elisabeth Thand Ringqvist

== Liberal thinkers ==
In the Contributions to liberal theory the following Swedish thinkers are included:

- Anders Chydenius (1729–1803)
- Ivan Bratt (1878–1956)
- Bertil Ohlin (1899–1979)

== See also ==
- History of Sweden
- Politics of Sweden
- List of political parties in Sweden
