= Sven Wedén =

Swedish politician (1913–1976)

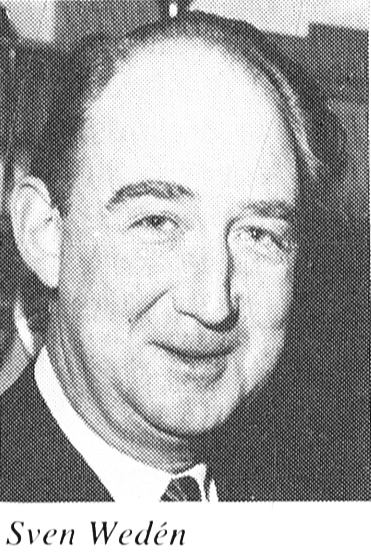

Leader of the People's Party
- In office 1967–1968
- Preceded by: Bertil Ohlin
- Succeeded by: Gunnar Helén

Personal details
- Born: 23 July 1913; Eskilstuna, Sweden
- Died: 31 March 1976 (aged 62); Båstad, Sweden

Sven Wedén (23 July 1913 – 31 March 1976) was a Swedish politician. He was the leader of the Swedish People's Party from 1967 to 1969.

Wedén survived severe tuberculosis and became a businessman in the family company, a metal manufacturing firm. Wedén had no higher education but became a self-learned intellectual, starting with extensive reading during long sojourns at tuberculosis hospitals. He was strongly pro-British and influenced by reading about British parliamentary life. Wedén also was passionately anti-Nazi and during World War II he joined the liberal party of Sweden, the People's Party, where he became city councillor, chairman of the youth organization and member of parliament.

In parliament Wedén for many years worked with housing and defence policy, but over the years he became part of the small circle of leading liberals around Bertil Ohlin, and finally Ohlin's successor as chairman and parliamentary leader. However Wedén's health was now broken and after his only election campaign as party leader, which ended with a setback, he resigned as party chairman in 1969 and later retired from parliament.

In 1968 a Stockholm-based satirical magazine Puss published a photo collage by Lars Hillersberg depicting Wedén naked which led to the confiscation of the issue.

Party political offices
Preceded by Bertil Ohlin	Leader of the Swedish People's Party; 1967–1969	Succeeded by Gunnar Helén
