= Ohlin Report =

1956 International Labour Organization report

The Ohlin Report was a report drafted by a group of experts of the International Labour Organization led by Bertil Ohlin in 1956. Together with the Spaak Report it provided the basis for the Treaty of Rome on the common market in 1957 and the creation of the European Economic Community in 1958.

== Summary ==
The key element of the Olin Report was that the Common Market did not presuppose a harmonised level of labour standards. The report explained that exchange rates between countries reflect economic productivity and, thereby, offset the advantages of lower wages in other States. As a consequence, States with a higher levels of social protection and higher wages should not fear competition from low cost countries. This explains the fact that the Articles 117 and 118 of the European Economic Community treaty are soft in nature, while in contrast the hard Articles 119 and 120 of the EEC treaty have a limited scope.

== See also ==
- UK labour law
- EU law
- European labour law
