= Lars Norén =

Swedish playwright (1944–2021)

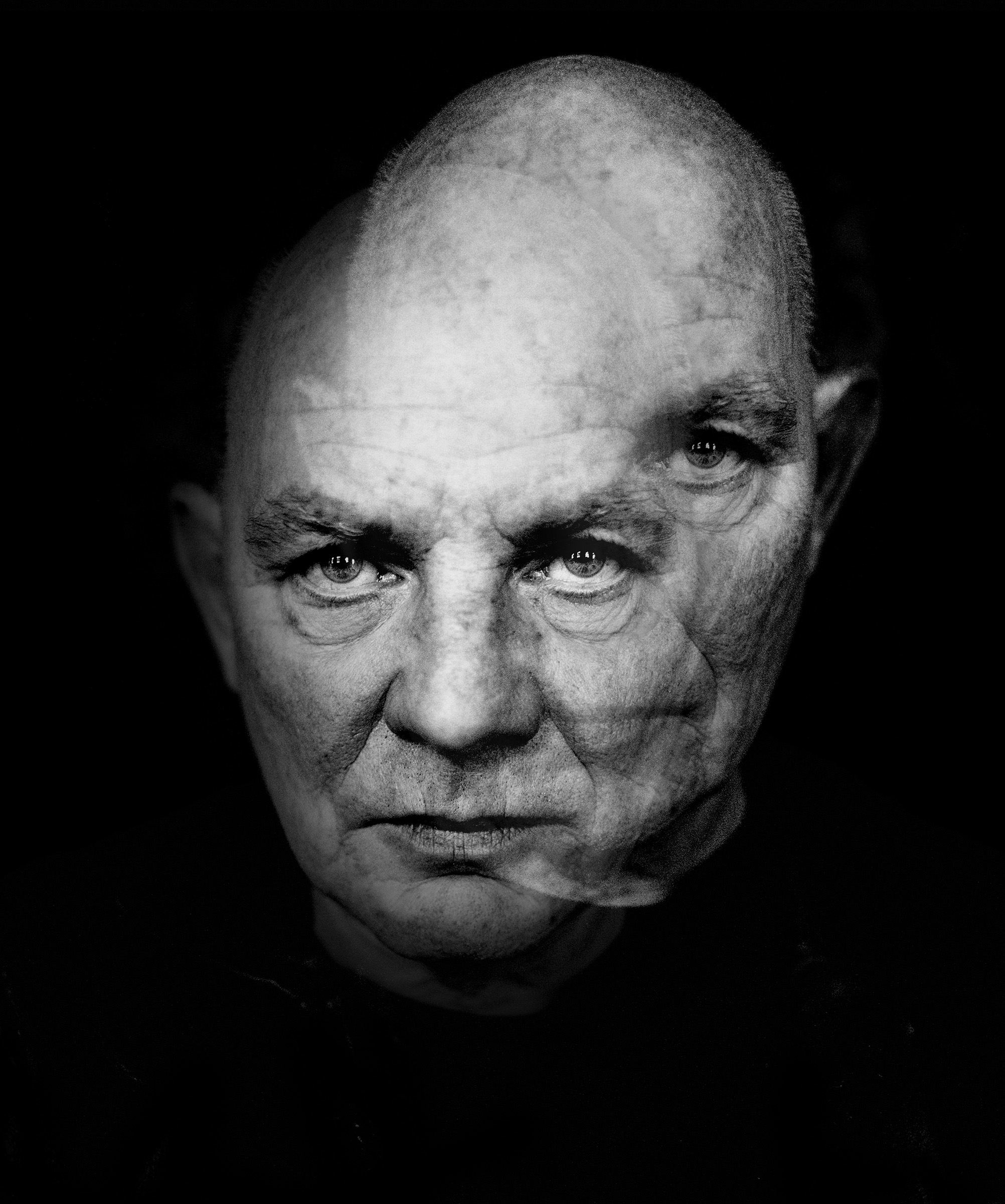
- Norén photographed by Oliver Mark in 2003
- Born: Lars Norén; 9 April 1944; Stockholm, Sweden
- Died: 26 January 2021 (aged 76); Stockholm, Sweden
- Spouses: Elisabet Mörk (1970–1975); Charlott Neuhauser (1993–2003); Annika Hallin (2007–2013)
- Children: Linda; Nelly; Sasha
- Writing career
- Period: 1963–2021
- Notable works: Order; Natten är dagens mor; Kaos är granne med Gud; Personkrets 3:1; En dramatikers dagbok; 7:3

Lars Göran Ingemar Norén (9 April 1944 – 26 January 2021) was a Swedish playwright, novelist and poet. He was a director at the Royal Dramatic Theatre, artistic director of Riksteatern 1999–2007, and artistic director of Folkteatern in Gothenburg 2009–2012. Norén is commonly acknowledged as the foremost Swedish playwright since August Strindberg, and the great contemporary Nordic playwright alongside Jon Fosse. His dramatic work has been performed widely throughout Europe as well as in China and South America.

Norén's work spans across genres and styles, and explores existential and social themes. The dramatic works are driven by a poetic dialogue, with elements of absurdity and humour. Although they may appear traditional, they are formally experimental and modernist. Recurring motifs are the Holocaust, nightly quarrels in bourgeois families, alcoholism, and the socially marginalised.

The prefix Norén- is used figuratively in Swedish compound words, such as Norénjul ('Norén Christmas'). It refers to common themes in Lars Norén’s work, and evokes a sense of anxiety, a bleak domestic atmosphere, bitter conflict, excessive alcohol consumption, guilt, and shame. A 'Norén Christmas' is the antithesis of the idyllic 'Bergman Christmas' depicted in Fanny and Alexander.

== Career ==
Lars Norén's body of work is prodigious. He wrote and published well over 120 plays, seventeen volumes of poetry and fifteen volumes of prose including a five-volume diary made up of 6,300 pages. His dramatic work is written for the stage, television, and the radio.

=== Poetry ===
Norén made his debut in 1963 with the collection of poems Syrener, snö. The 1960s poetry has elements of expressionism, surrealism and concretism and has frequently been described as 'schizoid', as it overflows with nightmarish visions. This period is followed by the nomadic and bright lyricism of Kung mej och andra dikter (1973) and the so called diary poetry of Dagliga och nattliga dikter (1974), Dagbok (1976) and Nattarbete (1976). The form is increasingly compressed and ascetic, culminating in the hermetic poetry of Order (1978), Den ofullbordade stjärnan (1979) and Hjärta i hjärta (1980), the latter looking forward to the drama form by introducing a strong address and an element of theatricality. Hjärta i hjärta marked Norén's farewell to poetry. It would be thirty-six years before he returned, with Stoft (2016).

While Artur Lundkvist, Federico García Lorca, Raymond Roussel and Henri Michaux are intertextually important to the 1960s poetry, Gunnar Ekelöf, Paul Celan, Rainer Maria Rilke and Friedrich Hölderlin are key figures in the poetry of the 1970s. Order is largely written in dialogue with Paul Celan.

Norén was among the contributors of Puss satirical magazine in late 1960s.

=== Theatre ===
As early as the 1970s, Norén had begun exploring theatrical expression in TV plays such as Amala, Kamala (1971) and radio plays like Box Ett (1972). His first stage play was Fursteslickaren, staged at the Royal Dramatic Theatre in 1973 amid scandal and controversy. He returned to the stage with Orestes (1979) and Modet att döda (1980).

The semi-autobiographical plays Natten är dagens mor and Kaos är granne med Gud, which premiered in 1982 and 1983 respectively and were broadcast as acclaimed television productions in 1984, marked the real beginning of Norén’s fame as a playwright. With the series known as Borgerliga kvartetter (including the chamber plays Höst och vinter, Bobby Fischer bor i Pasadena, and Sommar) Norén reached a wider audience.

Among the roughly one hundred plays Norén wrote, particular mention can be made of De döda pjäserna, a cycle of fourteen plays including En sorts Hades, and the trilogy Morire di Classe, which began with Personkrets 3:1, giving voice to the socially marginalised on the streets of Stockholm. Under the collective title Terminaler, Norén wrote a long suite of shorter plays with existential themes, as well as several plays of a more social or political nature, such as Anna Politkovskaya In Memoriam, Kyla, and Krig. Many of these works have been staged both in Sweden and internationally. Eugene O'Neill, Harold Pinter and Samuel Beckett are often referenced in Norén's dramatic works.

Also notable is the controversial 7:3, written and performed in collaboration with a group of inmates, two of whom were active neo-Nazis and were allowed to express their views on stage as part of the performance. Further criticism was aimed at Norén and Riksteatern for their possible role in a chain of events that led to the Malexander murders. Two of the perpetrators had been granted temporary leave from their incarceration at Österåker Prison to participate in Norén's play. Journalist Elisabeth Åsbrink has chronicled the events in Smärtpunkten (2009), which was later adapted into the television series Smärtpunkten (2024) on SVT, with David Dencik portraying Norén. The years following the controversy are documented in first volume of Norén's diary, En dramatikers dagbok (2008).

During the 2000s, Norén undertook numerous directing assignments, staging both his own and other writers’ works, in Sweden and across Europe. From 1999 to 2007, he served as artistic director of Riks Drama at Riksteatern, and from July 2009 to November 2011, he was the artistic director of Folkteatern in Gothenburg.

=== Diary ===
Lars Norén is also known for En dramatikers dagbok ('Diary of a Playwright'), a monumental work of over 6,000 pages chronicling two decades of his life. The diary was published in five volumes between 2008 and 2022, the last of which appeared posthumously, ending mid-sentence. En dramatikers dagbok was selected the best Swedish novel of the 2000s in a 2025 survey of 101 authors, critics and scholars, published by Expressen.

== Private life ==
Lars Norén was married from 1970 to 1975 to Elisabet Mörk (born 1942) who worked as a script supervisor on various film productions from the 1960s. They had a daughter in 1971. In a relationship with Ann-Charlotte Bonner (born 1949), who also worked in film and television, he had a daughter in 1978. From 1993 to 2003, Norén was married to dramaturge and theatre scholar Charlott Neuhauser (born 1961). From 2007 to 2013, he was married to actress Annika Hallin (born 1968), with whom he had a daughter in 2009.

Lars Norén died on 26 January 2021, aged 76, following complications from COVID-19 during the pandemic in Sweden.

== Awards ==
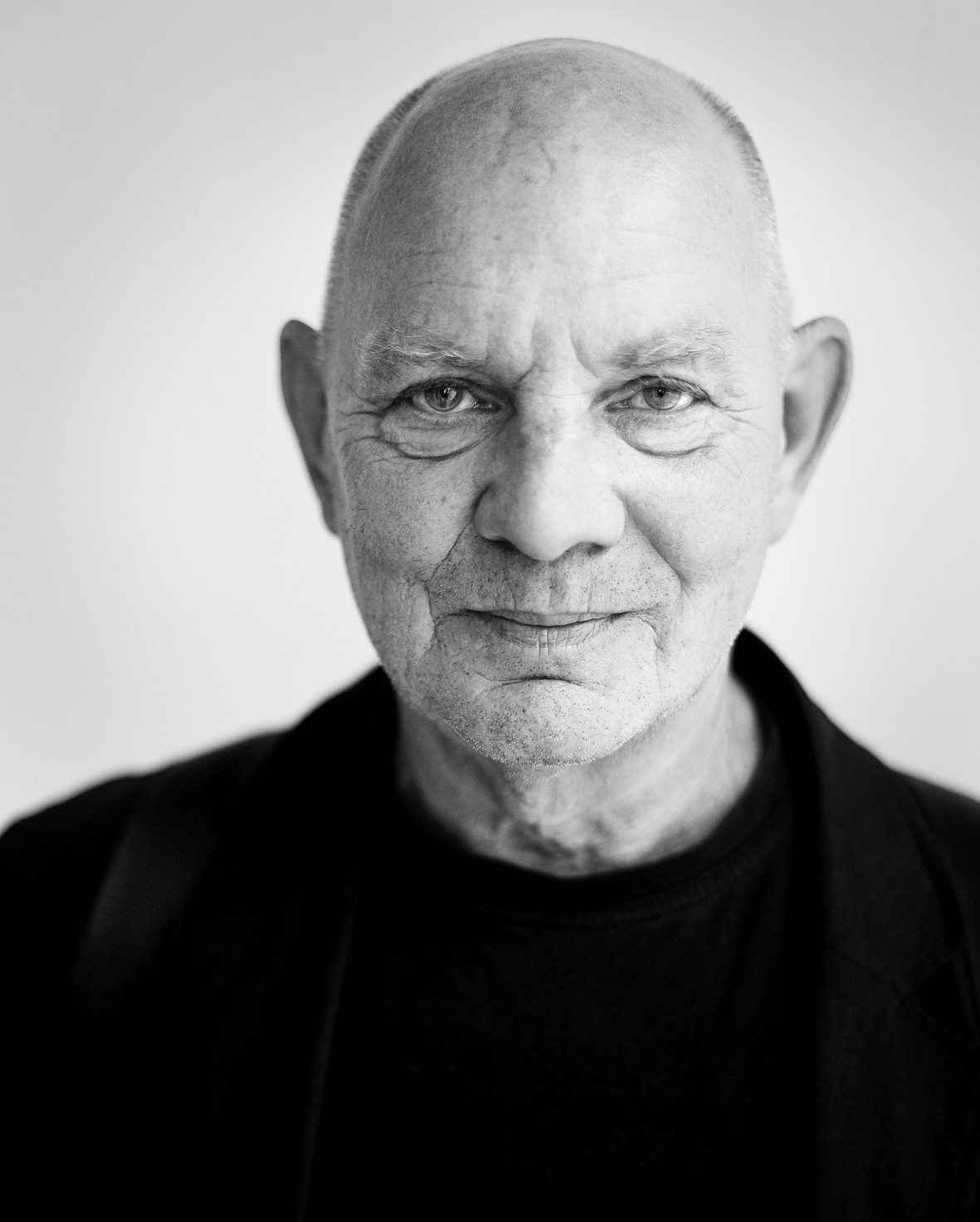
Norén in 2012

Norén was awarded the prestigious De Nios Stora Pris in 1980. In 2003, he received the Swedish Academy Nordic Prize, often referred to as the 'little Nobel'.

- 1967 – Albert Bonniers stipendiefond för yngre och nyare författare
- 1969 – Carl Emil Englund-priset för Stupor
- 1971 – Aftonbladets litteraturpris
- 1974 – Zornpriset
- 1975 – TCO:s kulturpris
- 1978 – Gerard Bonniers lyrikpris
- 1980 – De Nios Stora Pris
- 1982 – Aniarapriset
- 1985 – Kellgrenpriset
- 1992 – Expressens teaterpris
- 1994 – Pilotpriset
- 2003 – Svenska Akademiens nordiska pris
- 2008 – Litteris et Artibus
- 2012 – Sveriges Radios Lyrikpris
- 2012 – Bellmanpriset
- 2015 – Per Ganneviks stipendium
- 2015 – Stockholms stads hederspris
- 2016 – Ferlinpriset
- 2017 – Selma Lagerlöfs litteraturpris
- 2017 – Litteraturpriset till Pär Lagerkvists minne

== Works ==
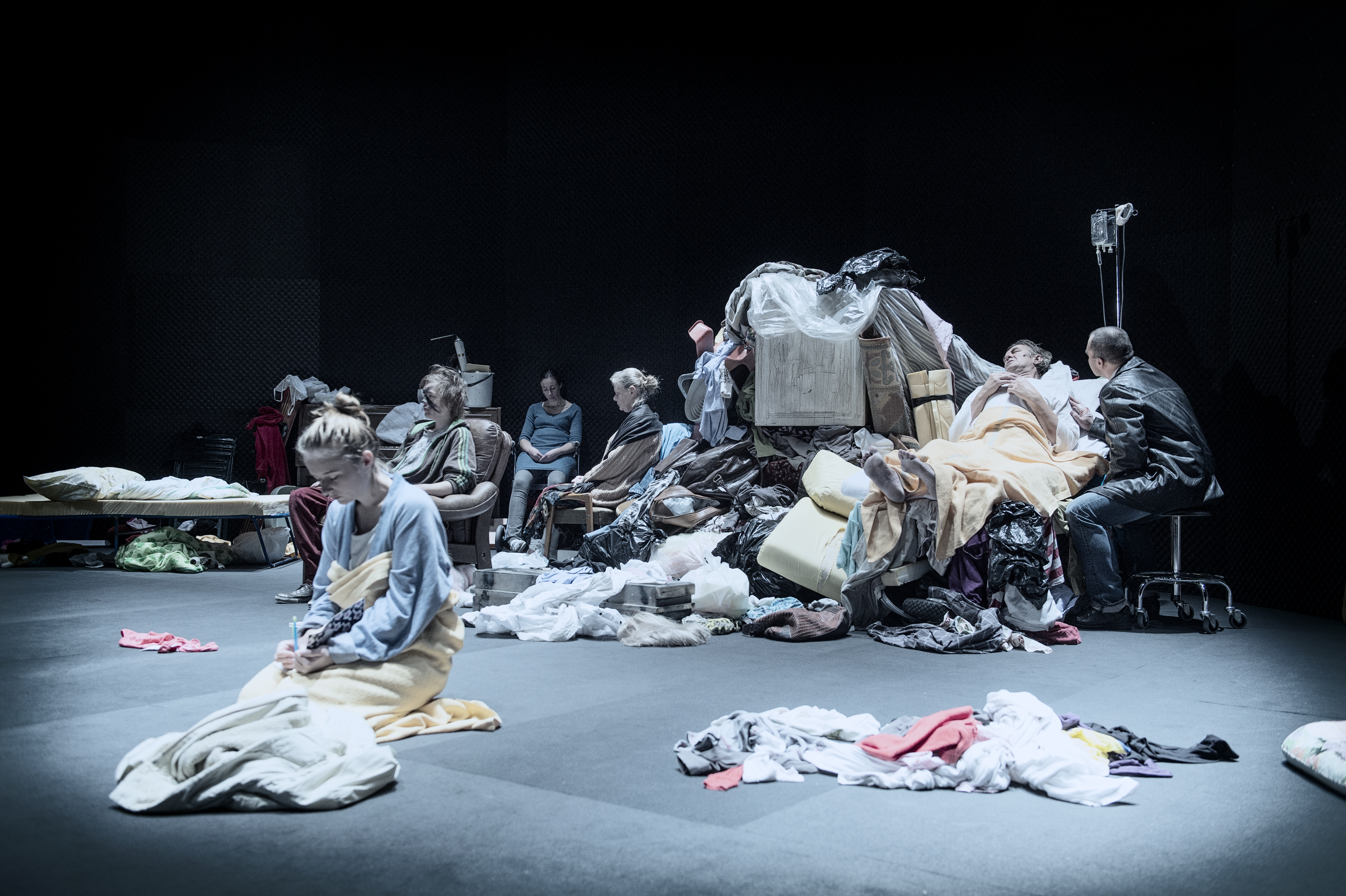
Scene from Norén's play Fragmente at Riksteatern in 2012

=== Poetry ===
- Syrener, snö (Albert Bonniers förlag, 1963)
- De verbala resterna av en bildprakt som förgår (Albert Bonniers förlag, 1964)
- Inledning nr: 2 till SCHIZZ (Albert Bonniers förlag, 1965)
- Encyklopedi (Albert Bonniers förlag, 1966)
- Stupor. Nobody knows you when you're down and out (Albert Bonniers förlag, 1968)
- Revolver (Albert Bonniers förlag, 1969)
- Solitära dikter (Göteborg: Författarförlaget, 1972)
- Viltspeglar (Albert Bonniers förlag, 1972)
- Kung Mej och andra dikter (Albert Bonniers förlag, 1973)
- Dagliga och nattliga dikter (Albert Bonniers förlag, 1974)
- Dagbok: Augusti–Oktober (Albert Bonniers förlag, 1976)
- Nattarbete (Albert Bonniers förlag, 1976)
- Hans Bellmer (with Ragar von Holten, Norstedts, 1978)
- Order (Albert Bonniers förlag, 1978)
- Murlod (Albert Bonniers förlag, 1979)
- Den ofullbordade stjärnan (Albert Bonniers förlag, 1979)
- Hjärta i hjärta (Albert Bonniers förlag, 1980)
- Stoft (Albert Bonniers förlag, 2016)
- Avgrunden av ljus (collected poems 1962–2016, ed. Mikael van Reis, 2021)

=== Prose ===
- Salome, Sfinxerna. Roman om en tatuerad flicka (Albert Bonniers förlag, 1968) ISBN 9789143503401
- Biskötarna (Albert Bonniers förlag, 1970) ISBN 9789113017174
- I den underjordiska himlen. Biskötarna II (Albert Bonniers förlag, 1970) ISBN 9100200638
- En dramatikers dagbok 2000 – 2005 (Albert Bonniers förlag, 2008) ISBN 9789100112820
- Filosofins natt (Albert Bonniers förlag, 2012) ISBN 9789100130053
- En dramatikers dagbok 2005 – 2012 (Albert Bonniers förlag, 2013) ISBN 9789100130305
- Ingen (Albert Bonniers förlag, 2014) ISBN 9789100135751
- Fragment (Albert Bonniers förlag, 2015) ISBN 9789100142827
- En dramatikers dagbok 2013 – 2015 (Albert Bonniers förlag, 2016) ISBN 9789100151768
- Efterlämnat (Albert Bonniers förlag, 2017) ISBN 9789100170349
- Fragment Il (Albert Bonniers förlag, 2017) ISBN 9789100173760
- En dramatikers dagbok 2015 – 2019 (Albert Bonniers förlag, 2020) ISBN 9789100183011
- En dramatikers dagbok 2019 – 2020 (Albert Bonniers förlag, 2022) ISBN 9789100197391
- Prosa 2020 (Albert Bonniers förlag, 2022) ISBN 9789100197407
- En liten roman (Bokförlaget Faethon, 2024) ISBN 9789189728318

=== Plays (Published) ===
- Tre skådespel (Albert Bonniers förlag, 1980) ISBN 9100448583
- En fruktansvärd lycka (Promenad press, 1981) ISBN 9174001299
- Två skådespel (Albert Bonniers förlag, 1983) ISBN 9100454273
- Endagsvarelser (Albert Bonniers förlag, 1990) ISBN 9100478237
- Och ge oss skuggorna (Albert Bonniers förlag, 1991) ISBN 9100551465
- Tre borgerliga kvartetter (Albert Bonniers förlag, 1992) ISBN 9100554065
- De döda pjäserna I-IV (Albert Bonniers förlag, 1995) ISBN 9100900397
- Radiopjäser 1971–1995 (Sveriges Radio förlag, 1996) ISBN 9152217698
- Personkrets 3:1 (Albert Bonniers förlag, 1998) ISBN 9100566365
- Skuggpojkarna (Albert Bonniers förlag, 1999) ISBN 9100570354
- Stilla vatten (Judiska Teatern, 2002)
- Dramer – Terminal & Samhälle (Albert Bonniers förlag, 2014) ISBN 9789100141424
- "De sista rummen", Grannar (Novellix, 2017) ISBN 9789175891835
- Olycka, illustrated by Agnes Jakobsson (Kaunitz-Olsson, 2022) ISBN 9789189015517
- Tre pjäser – Natten är dagens mor, Kaos är granne med Gud och Stillheten (Albert Bonniers förlag, 2024) ISBN 9789100804046

=== Television ===
- Belgrove Hotel, Goodbye (Sveriges Television, 1970)
- En hungersaga (Sveriges Television, 1970)
- Amala Kamala (Sveriges Television, 1971)
- Modet att döda (Sveriges Television, 1980)
- München Athen (Sveriges Television, 1983)
- Natten är dagens mor (Sveriges Television, 1984)
- Kaos är granne med Gud (Sveriges Television, 1984)
- Hebriana (Sveriges Television, 1987)
- Komedianterna (Sveriges Television, 1987)
- Bobby Fischer bor i Pasadena (Sveriges Television, 1990)
- Sanning och konsekvens (Sveriges Television, 1991)
- Och ge oss skuggorna (Sveriges Television, 1993)
- Som löven i Vallombrosa (Sveriges Television, 1995)
- Ett sorts Hades (Sveriges Television, 1996)
- Personkrets 3:1 (Sveriges Television, 1998)
- Detaljer (Göta Film AB, 2003)
- Kyla (Sveriges Television, 2005)

=== Radio Plays ===
- Box ett (Sveriges radio, 1972)
- Röster (Sveriges radio, 1973)
- Depressionen (Sveriges radio, 1979)
- Dräneringen (Sveriges radio, 1979)
- Akt utan nåd (Sveriges radio, 1980)
- När de brände fjärilar på lilla scen (Sveriges radio, 1983)
- Hämndaria (Sveriges radio,1987)
- Trio till världens ände (Sveriges radio,1995)
- Skuggor (Sveriges radio, 2011)
