= Lars Hillersberg =

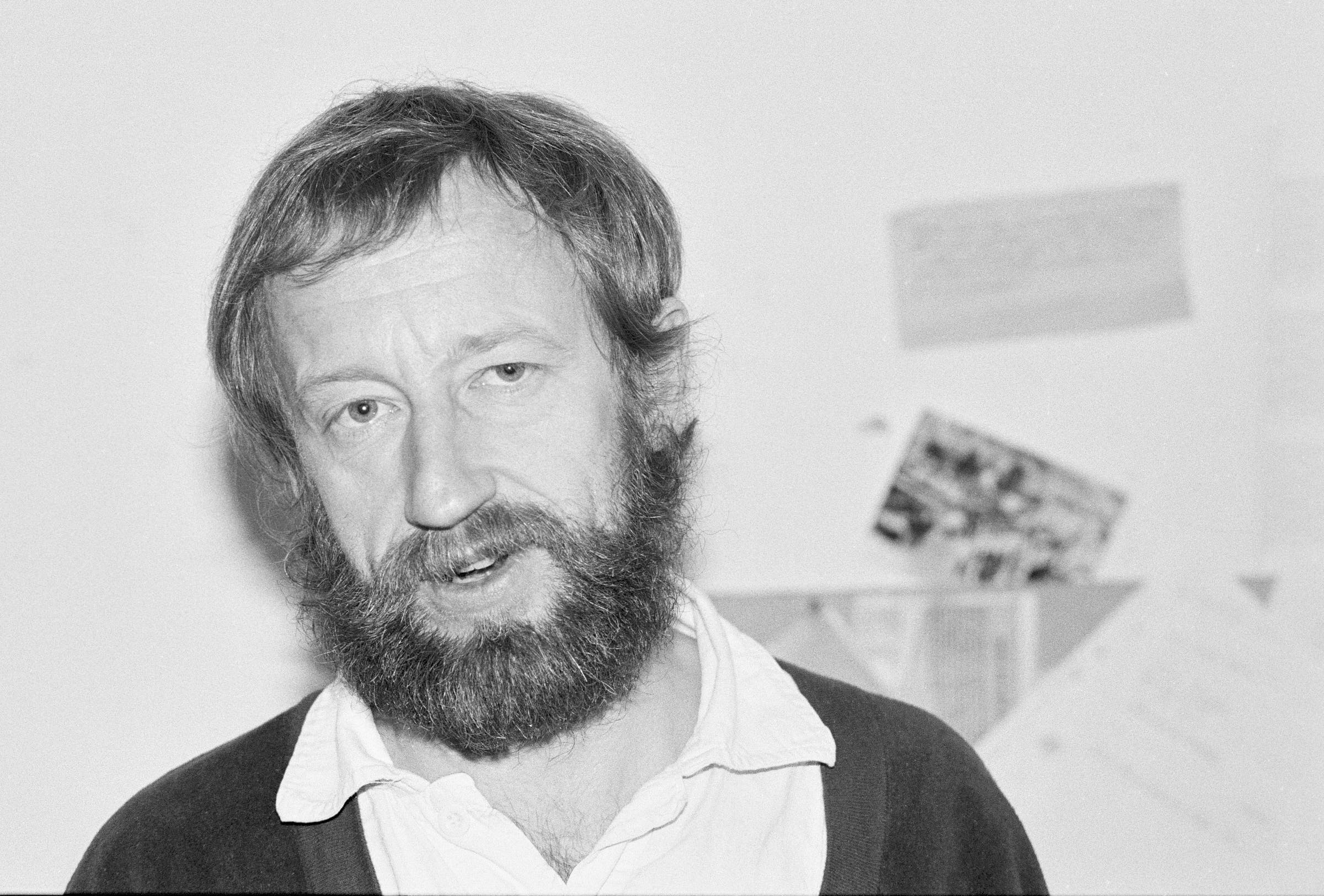
1979 Image of Lars Hillersberg

Lars Hillersberg (1937–2004) was a political Swedish artist, cartoonist, caricaturist and comics artist who often caused controversy.

Hillersberg was born in Flen. He studied at the Stockholm Art Academy in 1961–1966. In 1968, he founded the satirical magazine PUSS together with, among others, Carl Johan De Geer and Lena Svedberg. For over 35 years, Hillersberg continued to create political cartoons, comics, and other artwork heckling the Swedish society.

In the late 1990s and early 2000s, Hillersberg drew some controversial Israel-critical caricatures, which caused some debate about whether they were antisemitic or not. Hillersberg himself thought that those debates were pure idiocy and he explicitly stated that he was not an antisemite.

Hillersberg died in 2004. During his last years, he lived and worked in Gnesta outside Stockholm.
