= Gustaf Andersson (politician) =

Swedish politician (1884–1961)

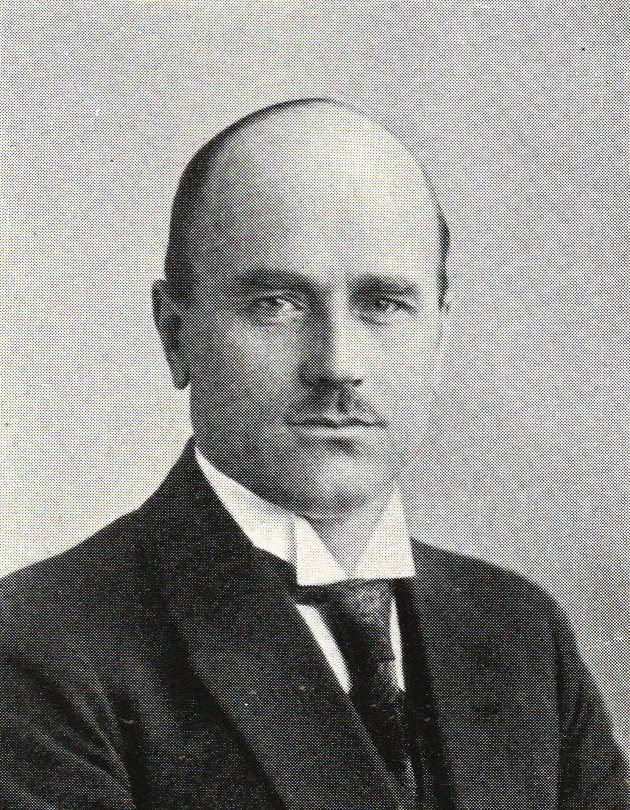

Governor of Kopparberg County
- In office 1944–1951

Minister of Communications (Transport)
- In office 1939–1944
- Prime Minister: Per Albin Hansson

Personal details
- Born: 1884 Rasjön, Sweden
- Died: 1961 (aged 76–77) Falun, Sweden
- Party: Liberals

Gustaf Andersson (1884–1961), also known as Gustaf Andersson i Rasjön, was a Swedish politician who served as the president of the Liberals party between 1935 and 1944 and also, as the minister of communications (transport). He was one of the members of the Riksdag, Swedish Parliament.

== Biography ==
Andersson was born in Rasjön, Dalarna, in 1884. He was elected to the Riksdag in 1921 and served there until 1948. Andersson was named as the president of the Liberals in 1935 which he held until 1944. During his tenure the party regained its popularity partly due to its support for the socio-liberal economic thinking of Bertil Ohlin. Andersson was against the activism of Finnish people in the country and argued that a cautious and isolationist policy should be adopted against it.

Andersson also served in the coalition government led by Per Albin Hansson which was formed in November 1939. Andersson was the minister of communications (Transport). Next he was appointed governor of Kopparberg County (later renamed Dalarna County) and remained in the office until 1951. He died in Falun in November 1961 at age 76.
