= Göteborgs-Posten =

Swedish newspaper

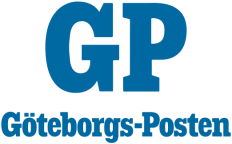
- Logo

- Front page, 27 December 2006
- Type: Daily newspaper
- Format: Compact
- Owner: Stampen AB
- Editor: Christofer Ahlqvist
- Founded: 1813
- Political alignment: Liberal
- Language: Swedish
- Headquarters: Polhemsplatsen 5, Gothenburg
- Circulation: 173,700 (2013)
- ISSN: 1103-9345
- Website: gp.se

Göteborgs-Posten (lit. 'The Gothenburg Post'), abbreviated GP, is a major Swedish-language daily newspaper published in Gothenburg, Sweden.

== History and profile ==
Göteborgs-Posten was first published in 1813, but ceased publication in 1822. It re-appeared in 1850. Publication seven days a week began in 1939. The paper is owned and published by a family company, Stampen, a subsidiary of Hjörne group. It changed its format from the classic broadsheet to compact on 5 October 2004.

Göteborgs-Posten is published in Gothenburg, containing coverage of local, regional, national and international issues. It is chiefly distributed in western Götaland. The stated position of the editorial page is liberal (which in Sweden means center-right).

== Circulation ==
According to its publisher, seven out of ten Gothenburgers read Göteborgs-Posten daily in 2008. In 1998 the circulation of the paper was 258,000 copies on weekdays and 286,000 copies on Sundays. The paper had a circulation of 245,900 copies on weekdays in 2005. It reached about 600,000 people every day with a circulation of 245,700 in 2006. Its 2010, the circulation was 227,200 copies. The paper had a circulation of 189,400 copies in 2012 and 173,700 copies in 2013.

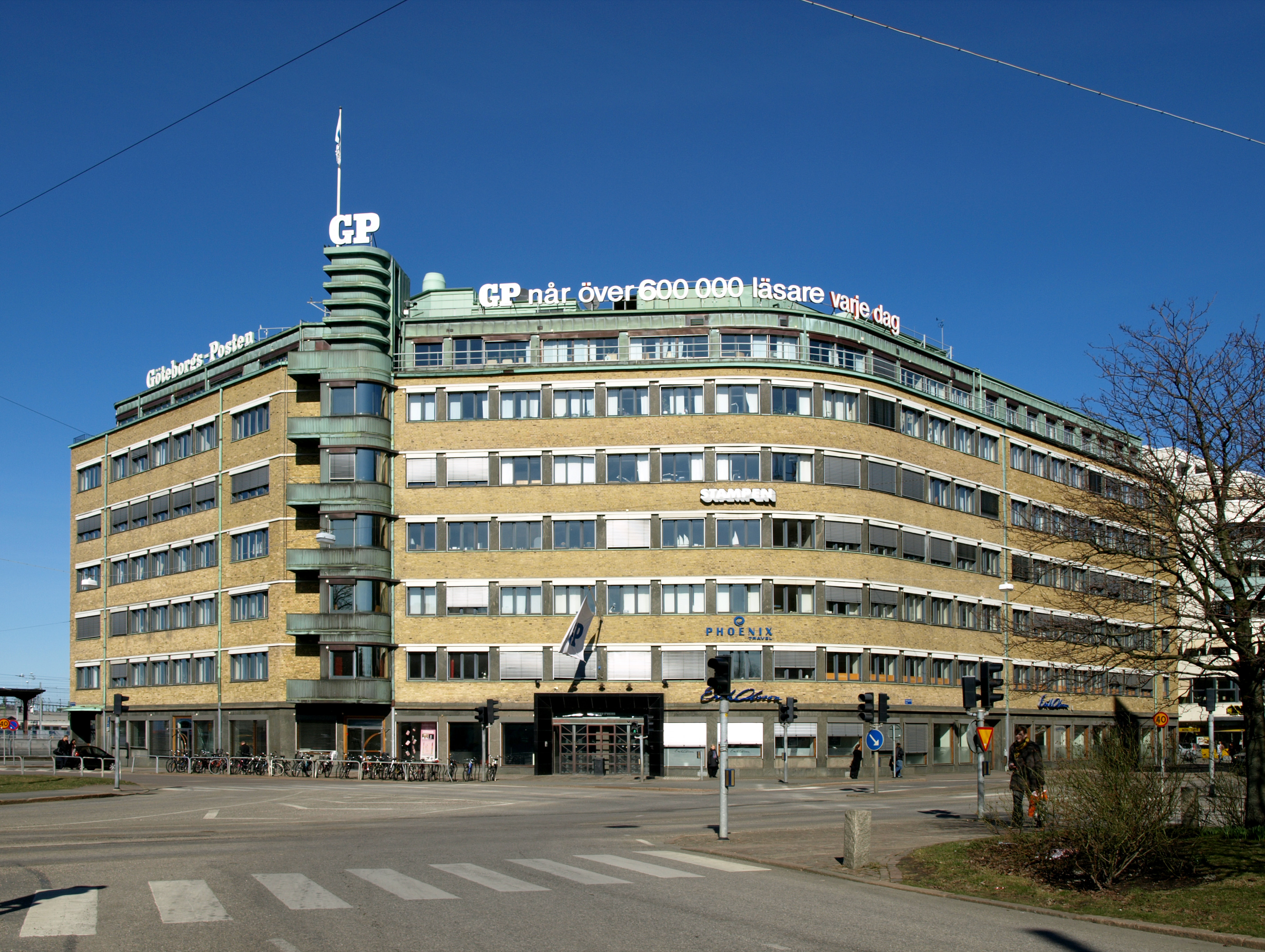
GP-building

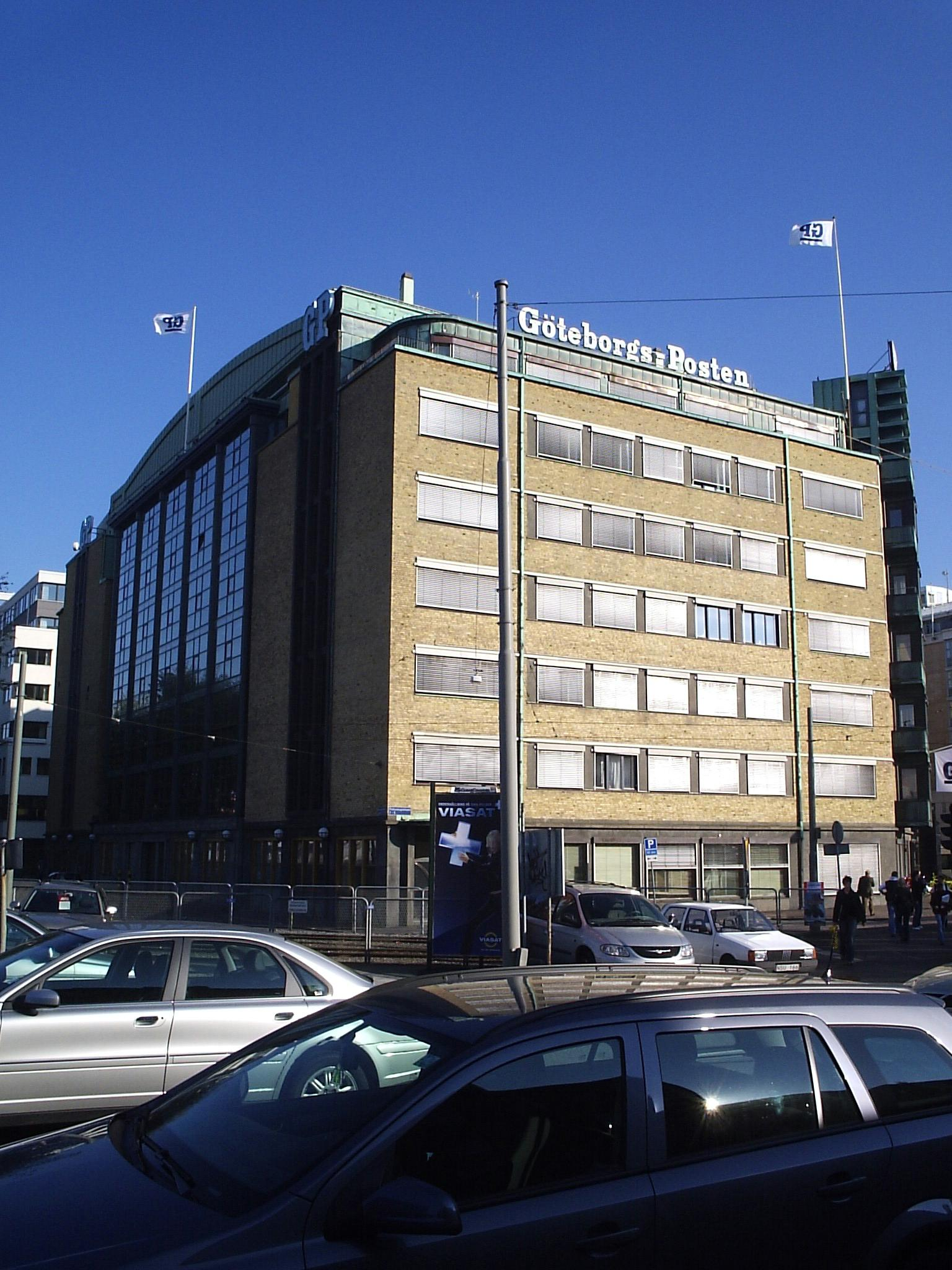
GP-building

== See also ==
- Göteborgs Handels- och Sjöfartstidning
- List of Swedish newspapers
