= Gunnar Helén =

Swedish politician, journalist and civil servant

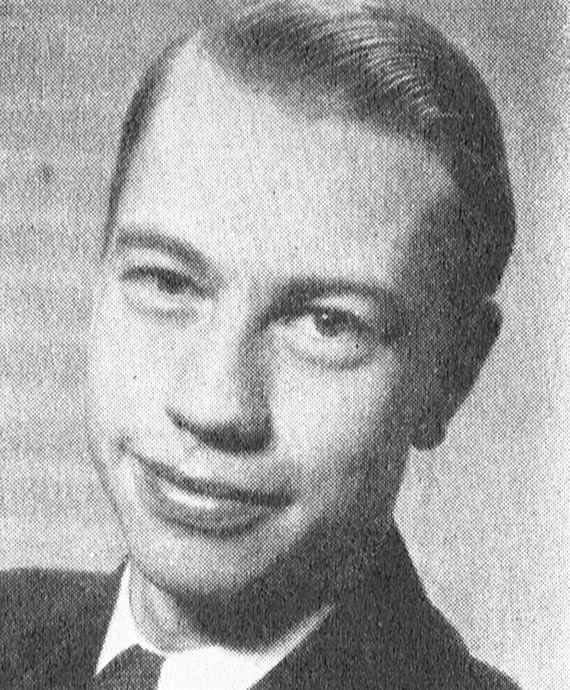

Governor of Stockholm County
- In office 1977–1984

Leader of the People's Party
- In office 1969–1975
- Preceded by: Sven Wedén
- Succeeded by: Per Ahlmark

Governor of Kronoberg County
- In office 1965–1970

Personal details
- Born: 5 June 1918 Vingåker, Sweden
- Died: 7 December 2002 (aged 84) Nacka, Sweden

Gunnar Helén (5 June 1918 – 7 December 2002) was a Swedish liberal politician. He was party leader of Liberal People's Party 1969–1975, Governor of Kronoberg County 1965–1970 and of Stockholm County 1977–1984.

Helén was awarded the Illis quorum in 1984 and 1987.

== Biography ==
Helén was the son of the supervising teacher Gustaf Helén and Ingeborg Andersson and married in 1938 to the assistant professor Ingrid Rying, daughter of the head teacher Karl-Johan Rying and Märta Eriksson. Gunnar Helén was also a brother-in-law to the author Matts Rying. Like his son Gunnar, his father Gustaf Helén was a liberal, while his father-in-law Karl-Johan Rying was an active Social Democrat.

After graduating in Örebro, Gunnar Helén studied at Uppsala University, where in 1946 he became a doctor of philosophy in Nordic languages on a dissertation on Birger Sjöberg. As a journalist, he worked at Radiotjänst, where he did a famous report from Kungsgatan, Stockholm on Friday, May 7, 1945, but also in 1939 announced that the Second World War had broken out with England and France declaring war on Germany on September 3. Helen also did the first youth program on radio We open a window in 1944, including a report from Högbacka dance floor.

Helén also worked at Stockholms-Tidningen, where he was a cultural journalist, and at Svenska Morgonbladet. He also wrote reviews in the home magazine Katrineholms-Kuriren. In 1956, he was appointed associate professor at Stockholm University.

He was a Member of the Riksdag 1953–1966 for Stockholm County's constituency in the second chamber, and 1970–1976 for the City of Stockholm constituency in the first chamber, later the unicameral Riksdag. As a Member of Parliament in the 1950s, he had a great influence on school policy and played an important role in the investigative work that preceded the introduction of compulsory school, a form of schooling that later changed so that much of what Gunnar Helén sought was lost.

Gunnar Helén was County Governor of Kronoberg County 1965-1969 and County Governor of Stockholm County 1977-1984. He was chairman of the board of Sveriges Radios from 1978 to 1984, and subsequently on the board of the Nerikes Allehanda newspaper group. Mr and Mrs Helén are buried in Västra Vingåker cemetery.

== See also ==
- Governor of Stockholm County
- List of governors of Kronoberg County

Party political offices
Preceded by Sven Wedén	Leader of the Swedish Liberal Party; 1969–1975	Succeeded by Per Ahlmark
