= Liberals (Sweden) =

The Liberals Liberalerna
- Abbreviation: L
- Chairperson: Simona Mohamsson
- Party secretary: Fredrik Brange
- Parliamentary group leader: Lina Nordquist
- Founded: 5 August 1934; 92 years ago
- Merger of: Free-minded National Association; Liberal Party of Sweden
- Headquarters: Riksgatan 2, Stockholm
- Student wing: Liberala studenter
- Youth wing: Liberal Youth of Sweden
- Women's wing: Liberala kvinnor
- Membership (2023): ▼9,799
- Ideology: Conservative liberalism Liberalism (Swedish)
- Political position: Centre-right
- European affiliation: ALDE Party
- European Parliament group: Renew Europe
- International affiliation: Liberal International
- Nordic affiliation: Centre Group
- Colours: Blue; White
- Riksdag: 19 / 349
- European Parliament: 1 / 21
- County councils: 57 / 1,720
- Municipal councils: 509 / 12,614

Website
- liberalerna.se

The Liberals (Swedish: Liberalerna, L), formerly known as the Liberal People's Party (Swedish: Folkpartiet liberalerna, FP) until 22 November 2015, is a political party in Sweden generally described as liberal or conservative-liberal. The party is a member of the Liberal International and Renew Europe.

The Liberals are considered centre-right, but have historically been situated in the centre of the Swedish political landscape. Since the leadership of Lars Leijonborg and Jan Björklund in the 2000s, the party has increasingly adopted more conservative-liberal positions.

Since 2022, the Liberals have been a junior partner in the Kristersson cabinet, a centre-right coalition with the Moderate Party and the Christian Democrats, which relies on parliamentary support from the nationalist Sweden Democrats.

== History ==
=== Early history (1902–1934) ===
In 1902, the Free-minded National Association (Frisinnade Landsföreningen) was formed, rooted in the Swedish suffrage movement of the late 19th century. It became the national organization of the parliamentary Liberal Coalition Party – political parties in Sweden had until this point mainly constituted informal groupings of like-minded members of parliament.

Universal suffrage was the primary goal of the liberal governments of prime minister Karl Staaff (1905–1907, 1911–14). During the Liberal–Social-Democratic coalition government of Nils Edén (1917–1920), univeral suffrage was finally achieved. The People's Party came to be part of the opposition from the thirties and onwards, opposing Social Democrat demands for nationalization of private businesses.

==== Divided over alcohol prohibition ====
The Free-minded National Association split in 1923 over the question alcohol prohibition; the anti-ban minority broke away to form the Liberal Party of Sweden. The Free-minded went on to lead several governments during the following years. The two parties reconciled in 1934 and merged to form the party in its present shape – the People's Party (Folkpartiet).

=== War-time unity (1939–1945) ===
The party participated in a wartime coalition government from 1939 to 1945, comprising all parties except the Communists. Sweden remained neutral during the Second World War.

=== Decades in opposition (1945–1976) ===
During the 1940s, party leader Bertil Ohlin developed his vision of a "free economy with social responsibility", establishing social liberalism as the party's ideological foundation. For nearly two decades, the party held the position of leading opposition party to the Social Democratic government of Tage Erlander.

=== Opposition and coalitions (1976–2004) ===
==== Multiple coalition governments (1976–1982) ====
In 1976, the party entered a three-party centre-right government with the Centre Party and the Moderate Party, ending 44 years of Social Democratic rule. Disputes over nuclear energy and tax policy led the People's Party to form a short-lived minority government of its own, with Ola Ullsten as prime minister. In various constellations, the centre-right parties held power in from 1976 to 1982.

==== Embracing market liberalism ====
In 1983, Bengt Westerberg was elected party leader. Under his leadership, the party moved in a more market-liberal direction, positioning itself more clearly to the right and firmly rejecting the employee funds and socialisation policies pursued by the Social-Democratic government. In 1990, the People's party added Liberal to its name, becoming the Liberal People's Party (Folkpartiet liberalerna).

==== Back in government (1991–1994) ====
From 1991 to 1994, the party formed part of a centre-right four-party coalition government under Moderate Party leader Carl Bildt. As the government lacked a parliamentary majority, it relied on the support of the populist party New Democracy.

==== Focus on integration ====
In the 2002 election, party leader Lars Leijonborg adopted a more conservative-liberal stance, launching a proposal for mandatory language tests as a condition of citizenship. The party more than doubled in its vote share. Leijonborg subsequently attempted, without success, to assemble a green-liberal four-party coalition government with passive Moderate support.

=== The Alliance (2004–2019) ===
The Alliance for Sweden was formed in 2004 as a common electoral platform for the centre-right parties: the Moderate Party, the Centre Party, the Christian Democrats and the Liberal People's Party.

==== The Alliance government 2006–2014 ====
In the 2006 election, the party joined the Alliance, a four-party centre-right coalition government led by Moderate Party leader Fredrik Reinfeldt. The election proved difficult for the party after it emerged that representatives of its youth-wing, Liberal Youth, had hacked into the Social Democrats' internal network and, on at least two occasions, copied secret information that had not yet been officially released. Leading members of the party and its youth organisation were placed under police investigation, suspected for criminal activity. All members of the party were acquitted by the court; however, an official of the party's youth organisation, and one from the Social Democrats as well as a newspaper reporter, were found guilty.

==== Electoral loss and opposition (2014–2019) ====
The Alliance government lost power following the 2014 election. The introduction of the Sweden Democrats in parliament created a new dynamic in the traditional Swedish bloc politics, with none of the two traditional left- and right-wing blocs achieving a majority. The centre-right parties instead voted to tolerate Stefan Löfvén's first Social Democrat cabinet. In 2015, the Liberal People's Party changed its name to the Liberals (Liberalerna). The Alliance parties campaigned together again for the 2018 election.

=== Supporting the Social Democrats (2019–2021) ===
Following the 2018 election, the Liberals and the Centre Party voted against a proposed Moderate-Christian Democrat government led by Ulf Kristersson, citing concerns that such a government would be dependent on Sweden Democrat support. Instead, both parties chose to tolerate a Social Democratic-Green government led by Stefan Löfven after reaching a 73-point policy agreement. Party leader Jan Björklund announced he would step down and not contest the subsequent leadership election.

=== Return to the centre-right (2021–present) ===
Former integration minister Nyamko Sabuni (2006–2010) was elected to succeed Björklund as party leader. Following the 2021 Swedish government crisis, the party withdrew its support for the Löfven government. Instead, the party wished to form a centre-right government with Ulf Kristersson as Prime Minister. In February 2022, Sabuni stated that the Sweden Democrats would play an important role in achieving parliamentary support for a centre-right government. Whilst not ruling it out, she found it unlikely that the Liberals could accept Sweden Democrat members of cabinet.

==== Tidö Agreement (2022–present) ====
In the 2022 Swedish general election, the party received 4.61 percent of the vote, winning 16 places in the Riksdag. The party agreed to form a coalition government with the Christian Democrats and the Moderate Party, with the Sweden Democrats providing external support under the terms of the Tidö Agreement. In 2025, party leader Johan Pehrson resigned following poor performances for the party in opinion polls. He was replaced by Simona Mohamsson. In March 2026, Mohamsson stated her willingness to allow the Sweden Democrats to enter government following the 2026 elections – a position that represented a departure from the stance the party had adopted five months earlier.

== Ideology ==
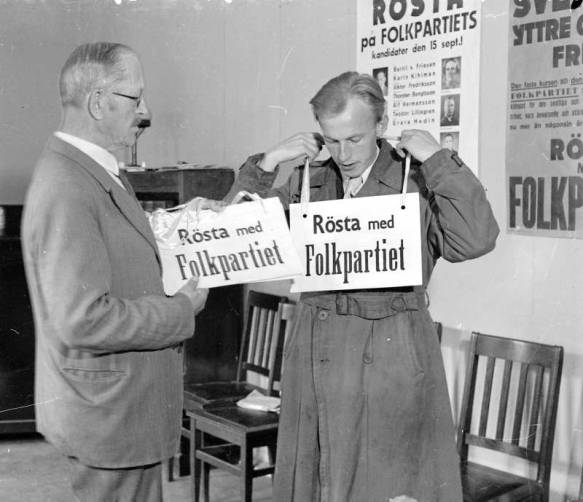
People's Party election workers, 1940 election

Historically, the party's official ideology has been social liberalism, a commitment the party continues to maintain. The party has come to adopt a broader range of leanings, including economic and conservative liberalism, alongside its traditional social-liberal stance. In the 21st century, and especially under the leadership of Jan Björklund, the party has integrated more elements of conservative liberalism in its social attitudes, taking tougher stands on areas such as crime and punishment, law and order, and school and discipline, as well as strengthening its abolitionist policies on drugs.

In 2008, the Liberal People's Party's support for a controversial legislative change regulating the National Defence Radio Establishment (FRA), in particular upset its youth organisation. In 2021, the party adopted a more restrictive migration policy, proposed easier withdrawal of citizenship for immigrants, and criticised Muslim free-schools.

=== Foreign policy ===
Traditionally oriented towards the United States and the United Kingdom, the party was a strong opponent of communism and Nazism during the 20th century. While it was part of and supported the Swedish coalition government and its position of neutrality during World War II, the party advocated an active stance against the Soviet Union during the Cold War.

The party (alongside Moderaterna) actively supported the struggle of the Baltic peoples against the Soviet regime, whereas Social Democrats were wary of irritating the Soviets. As a consequence, it suffered several sharply worded rebukes from the often-ruling Social Democrats for endangering Swedish relations with the Soviet Union. It also criticised what it perceived as Social Democrat tolerance of left-wing dictatorships in the third world, and supported the United States in the Vietnam War. After the end of the Cold War, it became the first Swedish party to call for abandoning the country's traditional neutrality in favor of joining NATO.

On the European level, the Liberal People's Party was strongly supportive of the emergence of the European Union and campaigned for Swedish entry into it (achieved in 1995). It also campaigned for joining the Economic and Monetary Union of the European Union, which Swedish voters rejected in a referendum in 2003. The party has aimed to come across as the most "pro-European" party, trying to break what it refers to as the country's "isolationist" mindset. It is supportive of EU enlargement and also advocates further integrative measures, with some members, including the youth organization, openly calling for a single federal European state.

=== Party platform ===
The party's platform includes a free market economy, advocacy for Sweden to join the Eurozone, and a strong push for nuclear power. It maintains a traditional focus on gender equality, the school system and quality education. Having long been the primary advocate for NATO membership, the party now supports Sweden's integrated role in the alliance following the 2024 accession. Many within the party have also argued in favour of European federalism.

=== Statistical changes in voter base ===
Socio-economic group and gender of voters	Percentage of which voting for the Liberals					
Groups/Gender	2002	2006	2010	2014	2018	2022
Blue-collar workers	8	5	5	3	3	2
White-collar workers	20	11	10	8	7	6
Businessmen and farmers	15	7	7	7	5	6
Male	14	8	8	6	6	5
Female	16	8	8	5	5	4

The party enjoys higher support among people above the age of 65, tending to be higher among people who have completed higher education. Its support is lowest among people with a pre-gymnasial education. The party's voters are predominantly urban with more than 30% of L-voters residing in Metropolitan Stockholm. The party's support is especially strong in affluent municipalities such as Danderyd, Lidingö and Lomma. According to Sveriges Television's exit poll for the 2019 European parliament election, voters of the Liberals were the most likely to approve of Sweden's EU membership. In September 2022, 84% of L-voters supported Sweden's bid to join NATO.

=== Historical electorate ===
Historically the party had a strong base in the 'free churches' (Protestant congregations not part of the state church that turned into powerful grassroots movements in the late 19th century), but with the exception of certain regions, that is not a significant feature today.

== Election results ==
=== Riksdag ===
Election	Leader	Votes	%	Seats	+/–	Status
1936	Gustaf Andersson	376,161	12.9 (#4)	27 / 230	▲3	Opposition
1940	Gustaf Andersson	344,113	12.0 (#3)	23 / 230	▼4	Coalition
1944	Gustaf Andersson	398,293	12.9 (#4)	26 / 230	▲3	Coalition (1944–1945)
1944	Gustaf Andersson	398,293	12.9 (#4)	26 / 230	▲3	Opposition (1945–1948)
1948	Bertil Ohlin	882,437	22.7 (#2)	57 / 230	▲31	Opposition
1952	Bertil Ohlin	924,819	24.4 (#2)	58 / 230	▲1	Opposition
1956	Bertil Ohlin	923,564	23.8 (#2)	58 / 231	Steady	Opposition
1958	Bertil Ohlin	700,019	18.2 (#3)	38 / 231	▼20	Opposition
1960	Bertil Ohlin	744,142	17.5 (#2)	40 / 232	▲2	Opposition
1964	Bertil Ohlin	720,733	17.0 (#2)	43 / 233	▲3	Opposition
1968	Sven Wedén	688,456	14.3 (#3)	34 / 233	▼9	Opposition
1970	Gunnar Helén	806,667	16.2 (#3)	58 / 350	▲24	Opposition
1973	Gunnar Helén	486,028	9.4 (#4)	34 / 350	▼24	Opposition
1976	Per Ahlmark	601,556	11.1 (#4)	39 / 349	▲5	Coalition (1976–1978)
1976	Per Ahlmark	601,556	11.1 (#4)	39 / 349	▲5	Minority (1978–1979)
1979	Ola Ullsten	577,063	10.6 (#4)	38 / 349	▼1	Coalition
1982	Ola Ullsten	327,770	5.9 (#4)	21 / 349	▼17	Opposition
1985	Bengt Westerberg	792,268	14.2 (#3)	51 / 349	▲30	Opposition
1988	Bengt Westerberg	655,720	12.2 (#3)	44 / 349	▼7	Opposition
1991	Bengt Westerberg	499,356	9.1 (#3)	33 / 349	▼11	Coalition
1994	Bengt Westerberg	399,556	7.2 (#4)	26 / 349	▼7	Opposition
1998	Lars Leijonborg	248,076	4.7 (#6)	17 / 349	▼9	Opposition
2002	Lars Leijonborg	710,312	13.4 (#3)	48 / 349	▲31	Opposition
2006	Lars Leijonborg	418,395	7.5 (#4)	28 / 349	▼20	Coalition
2010	Jan Björklund	420,524	7.1 (#4)	24 / 349	▼4	Coalition
2014	Jan Björklund	336,977	5.4 (#7)	19 / 349	▼5	Opposition
2018	Jan Björklund	355,546	5.5 (#7)	20 / 349	▲1	External support (2018–2021)
2018	Jan Björklund	355,546	5.5 (#7)	20 / 349	▲1	Opposition (2021–2022)
2022	Johan Pehrson	297,566	4.6 (#8)	16 / 349	▼4	Coalition
2026	Simona Mohamsson	361,187	5.34 (#8)	19 / 349	▲3	

=== European Parliament ===
Election	List leader	Votes	%	Seats	+/–	EP Group
1995	Hadar Cars	129,376	4.82 (#6)	1 / 22	New	ELDR
1999	Marit Paulsen	350,339	13.85 (#4)	3 / 22	▲2	ELDR
2004	Cecilia Malmström	247,750	9.86 (#5)	2 / 19	▼1	ALDE
2009	Marit Paulsen	430,385	13.58 (#3)	3 / 18 3 / 20	▲1	ALDE
2014	Marit Paulsen	368,514	9.91 (#4)	2 / 20	▼1	ALDE
2019	Karin Karlsbro	171,419	4.13 (#8)	1 / 20	▼1	RE
2024	Karin Karlsbro	183,675	4.38 (#8)	1 / 20	Steady	RE

== Organization ==
=== Symbols ===
Current logo

Transitionary logo after being renamed to the Liberals (2015)

Logo of the Liberal People's Party

=== Party leaders ===
Leader	Took office	Left office
Gustaf Andersson	1935	28 September 1944
Bertil Ohlin	28 September 1944	1967
Sven Wedén	1967	26 September 1969
Gunnar Helén	1969	7 November 1975
Per Ahlmark	7 November 1975	4 March 1978
Ola Ullsten	4 March 1978	1 October 1983
Bengt Westerberg	1 October 1983	4 February 1995
Maria Leissner	4 February 1995	15 March 1997
Lars Leijonborg	15 March 1997	7 September 2007
Jan Björklund	7 September 2007	28 June 2019
Nyamko Sabuni	28 June 2019	8 April 2022
Johan Pehrson	8 April 2022	24 June 2025
Simona Mohamsson	24 June 2025	Incumbent

=== Affiliated organisations ===
The party has a youth organization called Liberal Youth of Sweden (Liberala ungdomsförbundet, LUF), which has its own platform and maintains a separate organisation from the party.Since 2024 its chairperson has been Anton Holmlund.

The women's organization is called Liberal Women (Liberala Kvinnor, LK, chairperson Amie Kronblad). Additionally, party members maintain a number of small ad hoc "networks" addressing specific issues.

=== International affiliation ===
The Liberals is a member of the Alliance of Liberals and Democrats for Europe and Liberal International. It is also part of Liberal organisations on the Nordic and Baltic levels. The party's MEP sits with Renew Europe parliamentary group (previously ALDE).

In the European Committee of the Regions, the Liberals sit in the Renew Europe CoR group with one full member for the 2025-2030 mandate.

== See also ==
- Alliance (Sweden)
- Liberal Youth of Sweden
- Liberalism and centrism in Sweden
- Fria liberaler i Svenska kyrkan
