= Marika Cobbold =

Swedish-British author

Marika Cobbold (born Anne Marika Hjörne) is a Swedish born novelist who writes in English. She made her literary debut in 1993 with Guppies for Tea.

== Life and career ==
Marika Cobbold was born in Gothenburg to Lars Hjörne and Anne Gyllenhammar; Pehr G. Gyllenhammar was her maternal uncle. She married British Naval Officer Richard Cobbold around 1975, with whom she had two children. Following her divorce from Richard Cobbold, Marika married Michael Patchett-Joyce, a barrister, in 2018 and they live in Hampstead, North London.

Her first novel Guppies for Tea was published in 1993. It was selected for the inaugural W.H. Smith Fresh Talent Promotion, shortlisted for the Sunday Express Book of the Year, and serialized on Radio 4's Woman's Hour. It was later adapted into a German television film starring Inge Meysel.

== Works ==
1993 Guppies for Tea

1994 A Rival Creation

1996 The Purveyor of Enchantment

1999 Frozen Music

2003 Shooting Butterflies

2008 Aphrodite's Workshop for Reluctant Lovers

2011 Drowning Rose

2021 On Hampstead Heath
