= Bertil Ohlin =

Swedish economist, politician, and Nobel Laureate (1899–1979)

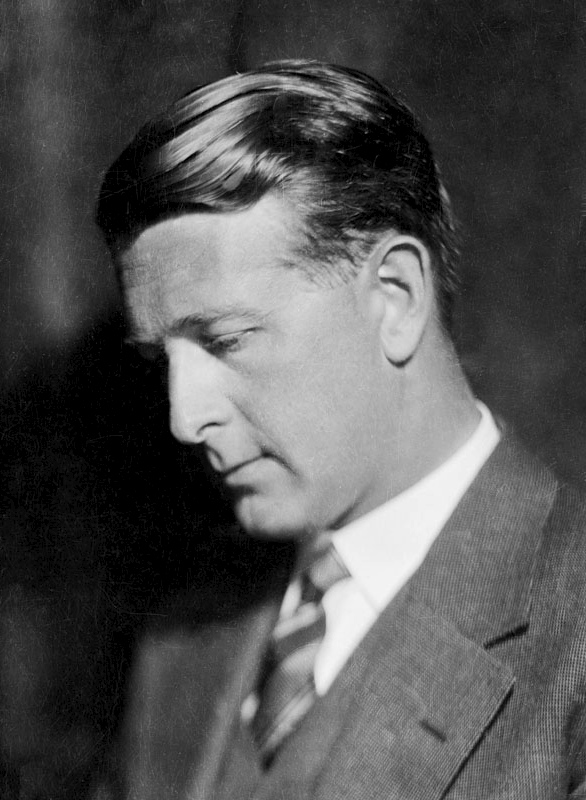
- Ohlin, c. 1930

Minister of Commerce and Industry
- In office 1944–1945
- Prime Minister: Per Albin Hansson
- Preceded by: Herman Eriksson
- Succeeded by: Gunnar Myrdal

Leader of the People's Party
- In office 1944–1967
- Preceded by: Gustaf Andersson
- Succeeded by: Sven Wedén

Member of the Swedish Parliament for Stockholm Municipality
- In office 1938–1970

President of the Nordic Council
- In office 1959–1959
- Preceded by: Nils Hønsvald
- Succeeded by: Gísli Jónsson
- In office 1964–1964
- Preceded by: Nils Hønsvald
- Succeeded by: Sigurður Bjarnason

Personal details
- Born: Bertil Gotthard Ohlin; 23 April 1899 Klippan, Sweden
- Died: 3 August 1979 (aged 80) Åre, Sweden
- Party: People's Party
- Education: Lund University (BA); Stockholm School of Economics (MSc); Harvard University (MA); Stockholm University (PhD)
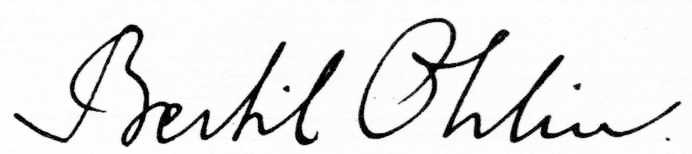
- Signature
- Scientific career
- Known for: Heckscher–Ohlin model Heckscher–Ohlin theorem
- Awards: Nobel Memorial Prize in Economic Sciences (1977)
- Fields: Economics
- Workplaces: University of Copenhagen (1925–1930); Stockholm School of Economics (1930–1965)
- Doctoral advisor: Gustav Cassel

Bertil Gotthard Ohlin (Swedish: [ˈbæ̌ʈːɪl ʊˈliːn]) (23 April 1899 – 3 August 1979) was a Swedish economist and politician. He was a professor of economics at the Stockholm School of Economics from 1929 to 1965. He was also leader of the People's Party, a social-liberal party which at the time was the largest party in opposition to the governing Social Democratic Party, from 1944 to 1967. He served briefly as Minister of Commerce and Industry from 1944 to 1945 in the Swedish coalition government during World War II. He was President of the Nordic Council in 1959 and 1964.

Ohlin's name lives on in one of the standard mathematical models of international free trade, the Heckscher–Ohlin model, which he developed together with Eli Heckscher. He was jointly awarded the Nobel Memorial Prize in Economic Sciences in 1977 together with the British economist James Meade "for their pathbreaking contribution to the theory of international trade and international capital movements".

== Biography ==
Bertil Ohlin was raised in Klippan, Scania with seven siblings, where his father Elis was a civil servant and bailiff. His mother Ingeborg influenced him with her left-liberal views on the society, with Nordic partnership and Karl Staaff as her role model. He received his B.A. from Lund University 1917 at the age of 18 and his MSc. from Stockholm School of Economics in 1919.

He obtained an M.A. from Harvard University in 1923 and his doctorate from Stockholm University a year after in 1924 at the age of 25. In 1925, he became a professor at the University of Copenhagen. In 1929, he debated with John Maynard Keynes and contradicted the latter's view on the consequences of the heavy war reparations payments imposed on Germany. (Keynes predicted a war caused by the burden of debt, but Ohlin thought that Germany could afford the reparations.) The debate was important in the modern theory of unilateral international payments. In 1930, Ohlin succeeded Eli Heckscher, his teacher, as a professor of economics, at the Stockholm School of Economics.

In 1937, Ohlin spent half a year at the University of California, Berkeley, as a visiting professor. He also worked as an outside expert for the Economic and Financial Organization of the League of Nations, together with Oskar Morgenstern and Jacques Rueff, supporting the EFO's work on economic depressions in the late 1930s.

Ohlin was party leader of the liberal Liberal People's Party from 1944 to 1967, the main opposition party to the Social Democrat Governments of the era, and from 1944 to 1945 was Minister of Commerce and Industry in the wartime government. His daughter Anne Wibble, representing the same party, served as Minister for Finance from 1991 to 1994.

== Heckscher–Ohlin theorem ==
In 1933, Ohlin published Interregional and International Trade. Ohlin built in it an economic theory of international trade from earlier work by Heckscher and his own doctoral thesis. It is now known as the Heckscher–Ohlin model, one of the standard model economists use to debate trade theory.

The model was a breakthrough because it showed how comparative advantage might relate to general features of a country's capital and labor, and how those features might change through time. The model provided a basis for later work on the effects of protection on real wages, and has been fruitful in producing predictions and analysis; Ohlin himself used the model to derive the Heckscher–Ohlin theorem, which predicts that capital-abundant countries export capital-intensive goods, while labor-abundant countries export the labor-intensive goods.

The Heckscher–Ohlin Theorem, which is concluded from the Heckscher–Ohlin model of international trade, states: trade between countries is in proportion to their relative amounts of capital and labor. In countries with an abundance of capital, wage rates tend to be high; therefore, labor-intensive products, e.g. textiles, simple electronics, etc., are more costly to produce internally. In contrast, capital-intensive products, e.g. automobiles, chemicals, etc., are less costly to produce internally. Countries with large amounts of capital will export capital-intensive products and import labor-intensive products with the proceeds. Countries with high amounts of labor will do the reverse.

The following conditions must be true:

- The major factors of production, namely labor and capital, are not available in the same proportion in both countries.
- The two goods produced either require more capital or more labor.
- Labor and capital do not move between the two countries.
- There are no costs associated with transporting the goods between countries.
- The citizens of the two trading countries have the same needs.

The theory does not depend on total amounts of capital or labor, but on the amounts per worker. This allows small countries to trade with large countries by specializing in production of products that use the factors which are more available than its trading partner. The key assumption is that capital and labor are not available in the same proportions in the two countries. That leads to specialization, which in turn benefits the country's economic welfare. The greater the difference between the two countries, the greater the gain from specialization.

Wassily Leontief made a study of the theory that seemed to invalidate it. He noted that the United States had a lot of capital; therefore, it should export capital-intensive products and import labor-intensive products. Instead, he found that it exported products that used more labor than the products it imported. This finding is known as the Leontief paradox.

== Awards and decorations ==
- (Sweden) Commander Grand Cross of the Order of the Polar Star (4 June 1965)

== See also ==
- Contributions to liberal theory
- Ohlin Report (1956)

== Significant publications ==
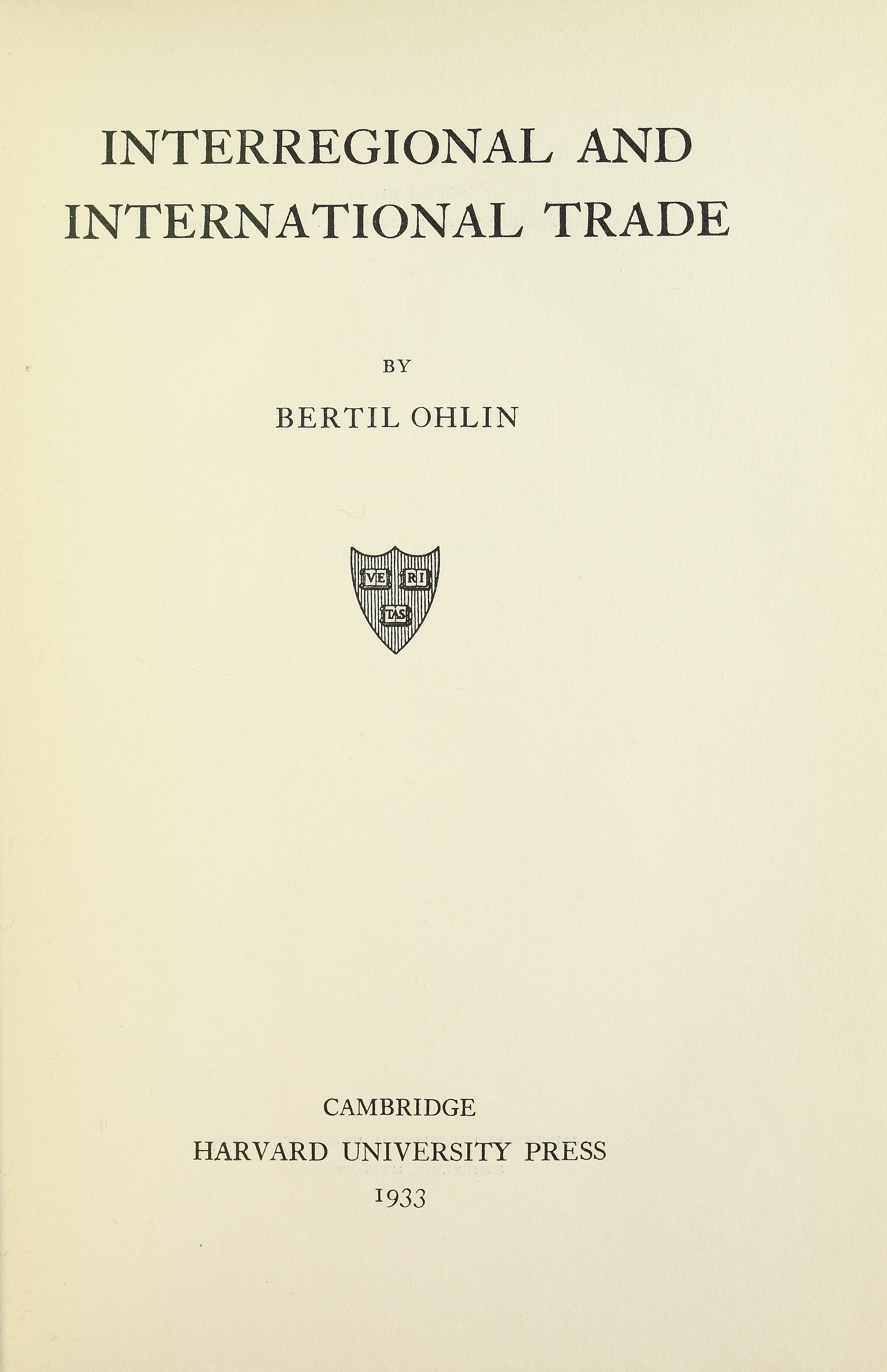
Interregional and international trade, 1933

- The German Reparations Problem, 1930
- The Cause and Phases of the World Economic Depression. Report presented to the Assembly of the League of Nations Geneva: Secretariat of the League of Nations; 1931.
- Interregional and International Trade, 1933
- Mechanisms and Objectives of Exchange Controls, 1937
- The Problem of Employment Stabilisation, 1950. Columbia University Press.

== Sources ==
- Encyclopædia Britannica Online "International trade"
- NobelPrize.org "Why Trade?"
- Chapter 60 The Heckscher–Ohlin (Factor Proportions) Model

Party political offices
Preceded by Gustaf Andersson	Chairman of the People's Party; 1944–1967	Succeeded by Sven Wedén
Political offices
Preceded by Herman Eriksson	Minister of Commerce and Industry; 1944–1945	Succeeded by Gunnar Myrdal
Awards
Preceded by Milton Friedman	Laureate of the Nobel Memorial Prize in Economics; 1977; Served alongside: James E. Meade	Succeeded by Herbert A. Simon
