= Carl Johan De Geer =

Swedish artist, writer, and musician

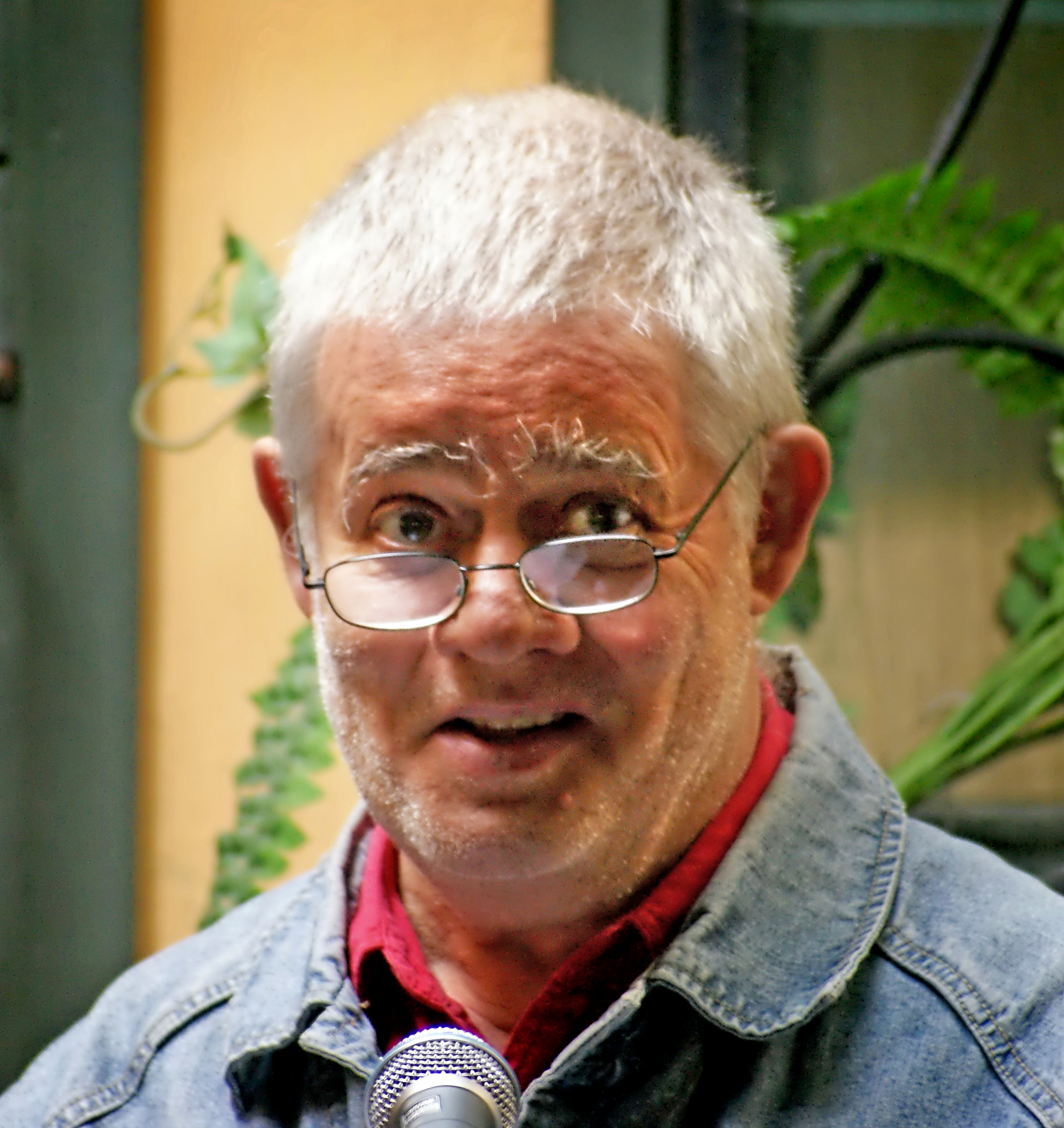
- Carl Johan De Geer during the Stockholm Culture Festival in August 2010
- Born: 13 July 1938
- Occupation: Painter

Baron Carl Johan Louis De Geer af Finspång (born 13 July 1938) is a Swedish artist, writer, musician and friherre (baron) of the De Geer noble family.

De Geer was born in Montreal, Quebec, Canada. He grew up in a castle in Skåne, in southern Sweden. He broke with his bourgeois background and became a leftist artist, and studied at Konstfack, University College of Art, Crafts and Design in Stockholm. He also exposed his grandmother's Nazi sympathies in a film called Mormor, Hitler och jag ("Grandmother, Hitler and I").

Most radical and provoking at that time was his 1967 poster of a burning Swedish flag with the words KUKEN ('COCK') and "Skända flaggan" (Desecrate the flag) written on it. The poster was shown in an art gallery, but was immediately confiscated by the police. During the late 1960s he was among the contributors of a satirical magazine, Puss, in Stockholm. De Geer has written a number of books and was also a member of the Swedish radical prog band Blå Tåget. He has been married to the artist Marianne Lindberg de Geer since 1987.

He was awarded the Illis quorum by the Swedish government in 2017.
