= Trade preference =

Preferential trading relationship

A trade preference is a preference by one country for buying goods from some other country more than from other countries. It grants special support to one country over another. It is the opposite of a trade prohibition.

For example, the Agreement on the withdrawal of the United Kingdom of Great Britain and Northern Ireland from the European Union and the European Atomic Energy Community (Brexit withdrawal agreement) stated that

In particular, nothing in this Protocol (the Protocol on Ireland/Northern Ireland) shall prevent the United Kingdom from concluding agreements with a third country that grant goods produced in Northern Ireland preferential access to that country's market on the same terms as goods produced in other parts of the United Kingdom.

In the UK, the Trades Union Congress (TUC) has stated that the country's trade preference system "should provide Global South countries with unilateral tariff-free access to the UK’s market on the condition of respect for fundamental ILO standards and progress towards the realisation of the UN Sustainable Development Goals, in particular Goal 8 on Decent work.

A preferential certificate of origin is a document attesting that goods in a particular shipment are of a certain origin under the definitions of a particular bilateral or multilateral trading agreement.

== See also ==
- EUR.1 movement certificate
- Rules of origin
- Trade mandate
- Trade prohibition
- Trade sanctions
- National treatment
- Most favored nation
