= ATR =

ATR may refer to:

== Medicine ==
- Acute transfusion reaction
- Ataxia telangiectasia and Rad3 related, a protein involved in DNA damage repair

== Science and mathematics ==
- Advanced Test Reactor, nuclear research reactor at the Idaho National Laboratory, US
- Attenuated total reflectance in infrared spectroscopy
- Advanced tongue root, a phonological feature in linguistics
- Atractyloside, a toxin and inhibitor of "ADP/ATP translocase"
- ATR_{0}, an axiom system in reverse mathematics

== Technology ==
- Answer to reset, a message output by a contact Smart Card
- Automatic target recognition, recognition ability
- Autothermal reforming, a natural gas reforming technology

== Transport ==
- ATR (aircraft manufacturer) an Italian-French aircraft manufacturer
  - ATR 42 airliner
  - ATR 72 airliner
- IATA code for Atar International Airport
- Andaman Trunk Road
- Air Transport Rack, standards for plug-in electronic modules in aviation and elsewhere; various suppliers e.g. ARINC
- Atmore (Amtrak station), Amtrak station code ATR

== Music ==
- All That Remains (band), an American heavy metal band
- Atari Teenage Riot, a German techno band performing "digital hardcore" music
  - ATR (song), a song by ATR

== Organisations ==
- Absent Teacher Reserve, of teachers in New York City
- Americans for Tax Reform
- Anglican Theological Review

== Other ==
- African Traditional Religion
- A US Navy hull classification symbol: Rescue tug (ATR)
- ATR: All Terrain Racing, a video game
- ATR.1 certificate, in trade between the European Union and Turkey
- ATR (company) (Auto-Teile-Ring), Germany
- Average True Range, a market volatility indicator
- ATR (TV channel), a Crimean Tatar television channel in Ukraine
