= Trade prohibition =

Trade hangoff between nations

A trade prohibition is a restriction in which one country will not buy goods from another country unless certain standards are met or conditions are followed, such as labor standards and environmental standards. It is the opposite of a trade preference. An example would be a ban on goods produced from forced labor.

An early example was the set of trade prohibitions by the Ming Dynasty.

== See also ==
- Most favored nation
- National treatment
- Trade mandate
- Trade preference
- Trade sanctions
