= International Certificate of Origin Guidelines =

Global guidelines on the issuance of Certificates of Origin

The International Certificate of Origin Guidelines (ICC Publication 809e) is a set of global guidelines on the issuance of Certificates of Origin published by the International Chamber of Commerce, in Paris, France, rolling out in 2021-2026 and beyond. It "aims to provide chambers of commerce and exporters with updates on new processes, including digitisation of the CO [Certificate of Origin] process". The ICC represents more than 45 million companies in over 100 countries These Guidelines cover Certificates of Origin as used in international trade, as opposed to any other purpose.

== Certificates of Origin ==
Certificates of Origin are a document utilized in international trade to identify the country of origin of products exported from one country to another. The requirement for, and the nature of information required in, a Certificate of Origin is established by the Kyoto Convention, whose latest revision went into force on February 3, 2006 As of 01 November 2023, there were 120 countries as contracting parties to the revised Kyoto Convention, including major exporting and importing countries such as the United States (as of 6 December 2005), Japan (as of 26 June 2011), United Kingdom (30 April 2004) China (PRC) (as of 15 June 2000), United Arab Emirates (15 June 2011), Saudi Arabia (as of 27 April 2011), Russia (as of 02 February 2011), Qatar (as of 13 July 2009), Netherlands (as of 30 April 2004), Egypt (as of 08 January 2008) and numerous others. In most countries, Chambers of Commerce are the trusted third party through which millions of Certificates of Origin are issued around the world.

There are two types of Certificates of Origin - Preferential and Non-Preferential. Preferential Certificates of Origin relate to exports which fall under trade preference agreements between countries or groups of countries, which have special reduced (or zero) rates of duty on trade between the nations. Non-Preferential Certificates of Origin relate to trade where a preference agreement is not in place between the relevant trading countries.

== ICC and International Trade Guidelines ==
The International Chamber of Commerce (ICC) publishes the International Certificate of Origin Guidelines as its Publication no. 809E. The publication, along with other rules of international trade published by the ICC such as the Uniform Customs and Practice for Documentary Credits (ICC Publication 600), Incoterms 2020 (ICC Publication 723) and numerous other ICC publications, form part of the structural backbone to international trade procedures around the world. One of the most well-known activities of the ICC is its International Court of Arbitration in Paris, which has resolved disputes in international trade and investment since 1923.

The ICC maintains an online Certificate of Origin verification site at which Customs Authorities and other interested parties can verify the authenticity of Certificates of Origin. At the ICC verification site, Certificates of Origin issued in Countries and the Chambers accredited under the ICC CO accreditation program can be reviewed. As well, the site maintains a list of currently participating countries and their CO accredited chambers.

In the Forward to the International Certificate of Origin Guidelines, Mette Werdelin Azzam, World Customs Organization (WCO) Senior Technical Officer (Origin) writes "[WCO] recognizes the importance of harmonization of procedures used for the issuance of Certificates of Origin by Chambers of Commerce worldwide"

== Topics covered in International Certificate of Origin Guidelines (ICC Publication 809e) ==
To process Certificates of Origin properly, avoid legal liabilities relating to errors or fraud, and assure a minimum of problems for exporters and importers with Customs authorities and foreign embassies, Chambers that are Accredited by the ICC issue Certificates of Origin against this complex set of guidelines with trained professional staff. The guidelines in ICC Publication 809e remind Chambers that they "...must constantly renew themselves while adhering to the most stringent international standards so that they can act as competent trusted third parties, and key players in the promotion and facilitation of world trade."

International Certificate of Origin Guidelines (ICC Publication 809e) has the following chapters:

| Chapter | Chapter Heading | Chapter | Chapter Heading |
|---|---|---|---|
| Ch. 1 | The Nature of COs and Digital Origin Statements | Ch. 13 | Special Cases in Origin Assessment |
| Ch. 2 | Training Requirements | Ch. 14 | Issuing Bodies |
| Ch. 3 | The Applicant | Ch. 15 | Insurance |
| Ch. 4 | Handling of Blank Forms | Ch. 16 | Information for Chief Executives of Issuing Chambers |
| Ch. 5 | Completion | Ch. 17 | Preferential Origin Documents |
| Ch. 6 | Daily Practice | Ch. 18 | Certification of Trade Documents |
| Ch. 7 | Keeping Records | Ch. 19 | False Security |
| Ch. 8 | Replacement of Documents and Fraud | Ch. 20 | International Certificate of Origin (ICO) Council |
| Ch. 9 | Confidentiality | Ch. 21 | The International Certificate of Origin Accreditation Chain (CO Chain) |
| Ch. 10 | Determination of Origin | Ch. 22 | CO Online Training |
| Ch. 11 | Dealing with the Manufacturer as Applicant | Ch. 23 | Electronic Certificate of Origin (eCO) Task Force |
| Ch. 12 | Dealing with a Non-Manufacturer Applicant | | |

== See also ==
- Certificate of Origin
- Rules of Origin
- International Trade
