= Trade mandate =

A trade mandate is a restriction in which one country will only buy goods if a certain standard is met or conditions are followed. It grants special support to one country over another more than just a simple trade preference. It functions in a similar way to a trade prohibition, without actually formally being one.

== See also ==
- Trade preference
- Trade prohibition
- Trade sanctions
- National treatment
- Most favored nation
