= Cryptographic Service Provider =

A cryptographic service provider (CSP) is a package that "provides a concrete implementation of certain cryptographic services."

A CSP offers operations and protocols to support a variety of use cases. The cryptographic application programming interface (API) provided by the CSP provides common solutions for different platforms, for example hardware and cloud services.

== Microsoft Windows ==
In Microsoft Windows, a Cryptographic Service Provider is a software library that implements the Microsoft CryptoAPI (CAPI). CSPs implement encoding and decoding functions, which computer application programs may use, for example, to implement strong user authentication or for secure email.

CSPs are independent modules that can be used by different applications. A user program calls CryptoAPI functions and these are redirected to CSPs functions. Since CSPs are responsible for implementing cryptographic algorithms and standards, applications do not need to be concerned about security details. Furthermore, each application can define which CSP it is going to use on its calls to CryptoAPI. In fact, all cryptographic activity is implemented in CSPs. CryptoAPI only works as a bridge between the application and the CSP.

CSPs are implemented basically as a special type of DLL with special restrictions on loading and use. Every CSP must be digitally signed by Microsoft and the signature is verified when Windows loads the CSP. In addition, after being loaded, Windows periodically re-scans the CSP to detect tampering, either by malicious software such as computer viruses or by the user him/herself trying to circumvent restrictions (for example on cryptographic key length) that might be built into the CSP's code.

To obtain a signature, non-Microsoft CSP developers must supply paperwork to Microsoft promising to obey various legal restrictions and giving valid contact information. As of circa 2000, Microsoft did not charge any fees to supply these signatures. For development and testing purposes, a CSP developer can configure Windows to recognize the developer's own signatures instead of Microsoft's, but this is a somewhat complex and obscure operation unsuitable for nontechnical end users.

The CAPI/CSP architecture had its origins in the era of restrictive US government controls on the export of cryptography. Microsoft's default or "base" CSP then included with Windows was limited to 512-bit RSA public-key cryptography and 40-bit symmetric cryptography, the maximum key lengths permitted in exportable mass market software at the time. CSPs implementing stronger cryptography were available only to U.S. residents, unless the CSPs themselves had received U.S. government export approval. The system of requiring CSPs to be signed only on presentation of completed paperwork was intended to prevent the easy spread of unauthorized CSPs implemented by anonymous or foreign developers. As such, it was presented as a concession made by Microsoft to the government, in order to get export approval for the CAPI itself.

After the Bernstein v. United States court decision establishing computer source code as protected free speech and the transfer of cryptographic regulatory authority from the U.S. State Department to the more pro-export Commerce Department, the restrictions on key lengths were dropped, and the CSPs shipped with Windows now include full-strength cryptography. The main use of third-party CSPs is to interface with external cryptography hardware such as hardware security modules (HSM) or smart cards.

=== Smart Card CSP ===
These cryptographic functions can be realized by a smart card, thus the Smart Card CSP is the Microsoft way of a PKCS#11. Microsoft Windows is identifying the correct Smart Card CSP, which have to be used, analyzing the answer to reset (ATR) of the smart card, which is registered in the Windows Registry. Installing a new CSP, all ATRs of the supported smart cards are enlisted in the registry.

=== Use of CSP in MS Office password protection ===
Cryptographic service providers can be used for encryption of Word, Excel, and PowerPoint documents starting from Microsoft Office XP. A standard encryption algorithm with a 40-bit key is used by default, but enabling a CSP enhances key length and thus makes decryption process more continuous. This only applies to passwords that are required to open document because this password type is the only one that encrypts a password-protected document.

== See also ==
- Single sign-on
- Smartcard
