= Diagonal cumulation =

Rules of origin principle in international trade

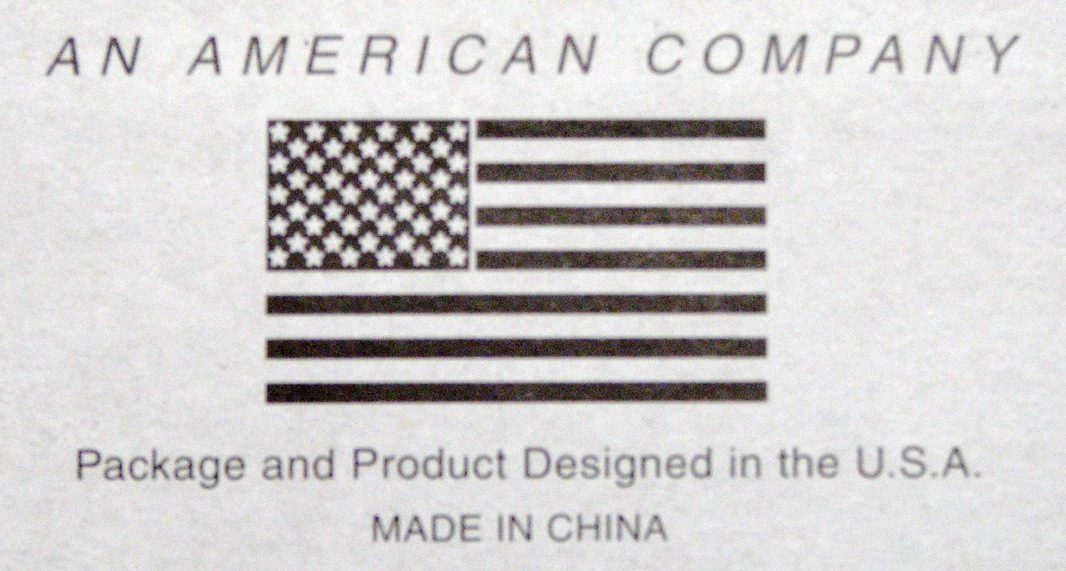
Country of origin labelling for a product designed in the United States and manufactured in China.

Diagonal cumulation is a rules of origin (RoO) provision in international trade whereby products from one country of origin can have value added to it in another as if it were native to that country. It includes the provisions from bilateral cumulation and exists between countries with identical cumulation provisions, even if they are in separate free trade agreements (FTAs).

The pan-Euro-Mediterranean cumulation system was introduced in the European Union in 1997 and allows for countries to cumulate stages of production without sacrificing their preferential access to EU markets. As with all preferential regimes, firms are thus able to utilise intermediate goods from countries with the same rules of origin and cumulation. This is understood to have fundamentally reorganised procurement strategies in peripheral countries.

== Originating ==
The EU defines originating products by where it is wholly obtained or produced, or where they were sufficiently worked. 'Sufficiently worked' means having been processed or manufactured to an extent which allows for the retention of originating status: for instance, sweetened or flavoured water must have all fruit juice, except grapefruit, lime or pineapple, originate from the EU. Products which do not fulfil these definitions or have an unknown origin are not subject to the provisioned preferential treatment or tariffs.

Proof of origin status is proved by a EUR-MED or EUR.1 movement certificate from the exporting country or an invoice declaration by an approved exporter for products under €6000 in value.

== EU ==
Union for the Mediterranean member states: Member states of the European Union Non-EU members Suspended members Observers

Countries party to the pan-Euro-Mediterranean system are EU member states and the European Free Trade Association (EFTA) states, Turkey, members of the Union for the Mediterranean, the Western Balkans (parties to the EU's Stabilisation and Association Process; Albania, Bosnia and Herzegovina, Kosovo, Montenegro, North Macedonia and Serbia) and the Faroe Islands (an autonomous territory of EU member Denmark). The entire area is covered by bilateral cumulation, but not necessarily diagonal cumulation (see below).

The World Trade Organization lists the EU (EBA) as the sole member offering diagonal cumulation; parties to the African Growth and Opportunity Act, Canada, the Eurasian Customs Union, Japan and the United States offer the more liberal free cumulation, while China, India and South Korea do not offer any cumulation.

Cumulation is one of the common provisions of the European Union Customs Union. Bilateral cumulation is defined as a product originating in one country being processed in another, and then adopting the origin of the second country. Crucially, they do not have to be considered 'sufficiently worked' in order to retain originating status. Diagonal cumulation can include products from more than two preferential countries.

Some products in Andorra and San Marino are also under diagonal cumulation. Furthermore, full cumulation is in place between the European Economic Area, which includes Iceland, Liechtenstein and Norway, and Algeria, Morocco and Tunisia. Full cumulation only requires products be 'sufficiently worked' before becoming originating, even for products which were initially non-originating.

Applicability of diagonal cumulation (1 August 2021)
	European Union	Switzerland and Liechtenstein	Iceland	Norway	Faroe Islands (Denmark)	Algeria	Egypt	Israel	Jordan	Lebanon	Morocco	West Bank and Gaza Strip	Syria	Tunisia	Turkey	Albania	Bosnia and Herzegovina	Kosovo	Montenegro	North Macedonia	Serbia	Moldova	Georgia	Ukraine
EU	N/A	Yes, from 1/1/06	Yes, from 1/1/06	Yes, from 1/1/06	Yes, from 1/12/05	Yes, from 1/11/07	Yes, from 1/3/06	Yes, from 1/1/06	Yes, from 1/7/06	No	Yes, from 1/12/05	Yes, from 1/7/09	No	Yes, from 1/8/06	Partially	Yes, from 1/1/07	Yes, from 1/7/08	Yes, from 1/4/16	Yes, from 1/1/08	Yes, from 1/1/07	Yes, from 8/12/09	Yes, from 1/12/16	Yes, from 1/6/18	Yes, from 1/1/19
Switzerland, Liechtenstein	Yes, from 1/1/06	N/A	Yes, from 1/8/05	Yes, from 1/8/05	Yes, from 1/1/06	No	Yes, from 1/8/07	Yes, from 1/7/05	Yes, from 17/7/07	Yes, from 1/1/07	Yes, from 1/3/05	Yes, from 1/5/16	No	Yes, from 1/6/05	Yes, from 1/9/07	Yes, from 1/5/15	Yes, from 1/1/15	No	Yes, from 1/9/12	Yes, from 1/2/16	Yes, from 1/5/15	No	Yes, from 1/5/18	Yes, from 1/6/12
Iceland	Yes, from 1/1/06	Yes, from 1/8/05	N/A	Yes, from 1/8/05	Yes, from 1/11/05	No	Yes, from 1/8/07	Yes, from 1/7/05	Yes, from 17/7/07	Yes, from 1/1/07	Yes, from 1/3/05	Yes, from 1/5/16	No	Yes, from 1/3/06	Yes, from 1/9/07	Yes, from 1/5/15	Yes, from 1/1/15	No	Yes, from 1/10/12	Yes, from 1/5/15	Yes, from 1/5/15	No	Yes, from 1/9/17	Yes, from 1/6/12
Norway	Yes, from 1/1/06	Yes, from 1/8/05	Yes, from 1/8/05	N/A	Yes, from 1/12/05	No	Yes, from 1/8/07	Yes, from 1/7/05	Yes, from 17/7/07	Yes, from 1/1/07	Yes, from 1/3/05	Yes, from 1/5/16	No	Yes, from 1/8/05	Yes, from 1/9/07	Yes, from 1/5/15	Yes, from 1/1/15	No	Yes, from 1/11/12	Yes, from 1/5/15	Yes, from 1/5/15	No	Yes, from 1/9/17	Yes, from 1/6/12
Faroe Islands (Denmark)	Yes, from 1/12/05	Yes, from 1/1/06	Yes, from 1/11/05	Yes, from 1/12/05	N/A	No	No	No	No	No	No	No	No	No	Yes, from 1/9/07	No	No	No	No	No	No	No	No	No
Algeria	Yes, from 1/11/07	No	No	No	No	N/A	No	No	No	No	No	No	No	No	No	No	No	No	No	No	No	No	No	No
Egypt	Yes, from 1/3/06	Yes, from 1/8/07	Yes, from 1/8/07	Yes, from 1/8/07	No	No	N/A	No	Yes, from 6/7/06	No	Yes, from 6/7/06	No	No	Yes, from 6/7/06	Yes, from 1/3/07	No	No	No	No	No	No	No	No	No
Israel	Yes, from 1/1/06	Yes, from 1/7/05	Yes, from 1/7/05	Yes, from 1/7/05	No	No	No	N/A	Yes, from 9/2/06	No	No	No	No	No	Yes, from 1/3/06	No	No	No	No	No	No	No	No	No
Jordan	Yes, from 1/7/06	Yes, from 17/7/07	Yes, from 17/7/07	Yes, from 17/7/07	No	No	No	No	N/A	No	Yes, from 6/7/06	No	No	Yes, from 6/7/06	No	No	No	No	No	No	No	No	No	No
Lebanon	No	Yes, from 1/1/07	Yes, from 1/1/07	Yes, from 1/1/07	No	No	No	No	No	N/A	No	No	No	No	No	No	No	No	No	No	No	No	No	No
Morocco	Yes, from 1/12/05	Yes, from 1/3/05	Yes, from 1/3/05	Yes, from 1/3/05	No	No	Yes, from 6/7/06	No	Yes, from 6/7/06	No	N/A	No	No	Yes, from 6/7/06	Yes, from 1/12/06	No	No	No	No	No	No	No	No	No
West Bank, Gaza Strip	Yes, from 1/7/09	Yes, from 1/5/16	Yes, from 1/5/16	Yes, from 1/5/16	No	No	No	No	No	No	No	N/A	No	No	Yes, from 26/3/21	No	No	No	No	No	No	No	No	No
Syria	No	No	No	No	No	No	No	No	No	No	No	No	N/A	No	Yes, from 1/1/07	No	No	No	No	No	No	No	No	No
Tunisia	Yes, from 1/8/06	Yes, from 1/6/05	Yes, from 1/3/06	Yes, from 1/8/05	No	No	Yes, from 6/7/06	No	Yes, from 6/7/06	No	Yes, from 6/7/06	No	No	N/A	Yes, from 1/7/05	No	No	No	No	No	No	No	No	No
Turkey	Partially	Yes, from 1/9/07	Yes, from 1/9/07	Yes, from 1/9/07	Yes, from 1/9/07	No	Yes, from 1/3/07	Yes, from 1/3/06	No	No	Yes, from 1/12/06	Yes, from 26/3/21	Yes, from 1/1/07	Yes, from 1/7/05	N/A	Yes, from 1/8/11	Yes, from 14/12/11	Yes, from 1/9/19	Yes, from 1/3/10	Yes, from 1/7/09	Yes, from 1/9/10	Yes, from 1/10/17	Yes, from 29/4/21	No
Albania	Yes, from 1/1/07	Yes, from 1/5/15	Yes, from 1/5/15	Yes, from 1/5/15	No	No	No	No	No	No	No	No	No	No	Yes, from 1/8/11	N/A	Yes, from 22/11/07	Yes, from 1/4/14	Yes, from 26/7/2007	Yes, from 26/7/2007	Yes, from 24/10/07	Yes, from 1/4/14	No	No
Bosnia & Herzegovina	Yes, from 1/7//08	Yes, from 1/1/15	Yes, from 1/1/15	Yes, from 1/1/15	No	No	No	No	No	No	No	No	No	No	Yes, from 14/12/11	Yes, from 22/11/07	N/A	Yes, from 1/4/14	Yes, from 22/11/07	Yes, from 22/11/07	Yes, from 22/11/07	Yes, from 1/4/14	No	No
Kosovo	Yes, from 1/4/16	No	No	No	No	No	No	No	No	No	No	No	No	Yes, from 1/9/19	Yes, from 1/9/19	Yes, from 1/4/14	Yes, from 1/4/14	N/A	Yes, from 1/4/14	Yes, from 1/4/14	Yes, from 1/4/14	Yes, from 1/4/14	No	No
Montenegro	Yes, from 1/1/08	Yes, from 1/9/12	Yes, from 1/10/12	Yes, from 1/11/12	No	No	No	No	No	No	No	No	No	No	Yes, from 1/3/10	Yes, from 26/7/2007	Yes, from 22/11/07	Yes, from 1/4/14	N/A	Yes, from 26/7/07	Yes, from 24/10/07	Yes, from 1/4/14	No	No
North Macedonia	Yes, from 1/1/07	Yes, from 1/2/16	Yes, from 1/5/15	Yes, from 1/5/15	No	No	No	No	No	No	No	No	No	No	Yes, from 1/7/09	Yes, from 26/7/2007	Yes, from 22/11/07	Yes, from 1/4/14	Yes, from 26/7/07	N/A	Yes, from 24/10/07	Yes, from 1/4/14	No	No
Serbia	Yes, from 8/12/09	Yes, from 1/5/15	Yes, from 1/5/15	Yes, from 1/5/15	No	No	No	No	No	No	No	No	No	No	Yes, from 1/9/10	Yes, from 24/10/07	Yes, from 22/11/07	Yes, from 1/4/14	Yes, from 24/10/07	Yes, from 24/10/07	N/A	Yes, from 1/4/14	No	No
Moldova	Yes, from 1/12/16	No	No	No	No	No	No	No	No	No	No	No	No	No	Yes, from 1/10/17	Yes, from 1/4/14	Yes, from 1/4/14	Yes, from 1/4/14	Yes, from 1/4/14	Yes, from 1/4/14	Yes, from 1/4/14	N/A	No	No
Georgia	Yes, from 1/6/18	Yes, from 1/5/18	Yes, from 1/9/17	Yes, from 1/9/17	No	No	No	No	No	No	No	No	No	No	Yes, from 29/4/21	No	No	No	No	No	No	No	N/A	Yes, from 26/3/20
Ukraine	Yes, from 1/1/19	Yes, from 1/6/12	Yes, from 1/6/12	Yes, from 1/6/12	No	No	No	No	No	No	No	No	No	No	No	No	No	No	No	No	No	No	Yes, from 26/3/20	N/A

== Brexit negotiations ==
Trade provisions of post-Brexit UK-EU relations are governed by the EU–UK Trade and Cooperation Agreement after the UK left the EU on 1 February 2020 and the transition period on 31 December. During the transition 'implementation period', the UK remained part of the European Single Market and Customs Union. Both the UK and EU agreed during Brexit negotiations there should be less restrictive RoOs, and a future relationship modelled after existing EU FTAs, such as those with Canada and Japan.

In 2021, the European Union Committee of the House of Lords recommended the UK Government "make full use of the Trade Specialised Committee on Customs Cooperation and Rules of Origin to ensure consistency in implementation across the UK and EU". It pushed for full diagonal cumulation with the EU: a letter by the Lord Goldsmith wrote its loss would lead to "instances where using a UK supplier will mean the EU company losing preferential access for its exports. In those cases, the UK company will likely become less attractive as a supplier and may lose its place in the supply chain"—however, EU officials said the UK "needs to sell any potential enhanced improvements to the rules of origin on the basis of mutual interest with the EU."

EU documents authorising Brexit talks emphasised ensuring "the protection of the Union’s financial interests and reflect the United Kingdom’s status as a non-Schengen third country that cannot have the same rights and enjoy the same benefits as a member." The EU calculated that, in 2020, trade liberalisation through unrestrictive RoOs would benefit the UK more than the EU.

== Impact ==
Restrictive RoOs have a negative impact on trade: a 2008 paper found an increase led to a 0.4% decrease in international trade. Following FTAs, a reorganisation in production was observed as the pre-2004 EU 15 shifted the intermediate stage of production onto peripheral partners. The pan-European system that began in 1997 allowed for cumulation to divide production into global value chains as exports are now largely of unfinished goods between production sites (66% worldwide in 2009); diagonal cumulation thus reduces the restrictiveness of RoOs as exporters take advantage of preferential access, increasing the volume of trade transactions between EU and peripheral partners.

Worldwide, it was found between 154 countries from 1980 to 2005 that diagonal cumulation creates 16% more intra-bloc trade while diverting 16% of extra-bloc trade. Full cumulation creates the most intra-bloc trade (35.8%) and diverts the least away from members to non-members (3.1%). Bilateral cumulation alone generates a statistically insignificant percentage of trade (0.9%) while diverting 9% away.
