= Like product =

A “like product” describes the particular relationship in international trade law between two goods that are produced by two different trading nations. This concept is the foundation of the two central principles of the World Trade Organisation (WTO) system as outlined in the General Agreement on Tariffs and Trade 1947 (GATT): Most Favoured Nation (Article I) and National Treatment (Article III). If two products cannot be differentiated under the WTO system/GATT then the non-discrimination principle stipulates that a WTO trading member shall not discriminate between like products from different trading partners (giving them equally “most favoured-nation” status) and shall not discriminate between its own and like foreign products (giving them “national treatment”). In essence, if two products are found to be ‘like’ then the issue is whether the foreign product is treated less favourable than the domestic product or another foreign product.

The definition of ‘like product’ has given GATT and WTO's appellate body and panels many interpretive difficulties. It has been difficult to apply this concept of ‘like product’ uniformly throughout GATT since contracting parties have never developed a general definition of “like product” for application to all provisions of GATT, therefore likeness should be assessed on a case-by-case basis. The Japan – Custom Duties, Taxes and Labeling Practices on Imported Wines and Alcoholic Beverages panel and appellate body gave an apt metaphor in its final report:

- "The concept of "likeness" is a relative one and evokes the image of an accordion. The accordion of "likeness" stretches and squeezes in different places as different provisions of the WTO Agreement are applied. The width of the accordion in any one of those places must be determined by the particular provision in which the term "like" is encountered as well as by the context and the circumstances that prevail in any given case to which that provision may apply".

== Characteristics ==
There are many criteria to define ‘likeness’; however, ‘likeness’ must be assessed on a case-by-case basis. One must describe the individual criteria with some care, and after that it is possible to talk about degrees of likeness within the boundaries of those criteria or characteristics. In Japan – Custom Duties, Taxes and Labeling Practices on Imported Wines and Alcoholic Beverages 1987 the panel offered up four criteria (this list is not a strict guideline, neither is it exhaustive):

- Physical characteristics: the greater the physical identity of two products the more likely it is that they are interchangeable,
- Functional likeness (end-uses): the extent to which two products do in fact perform the same function,
- Tariff applications
- Consumer tastes and habits: minor differences in taste and habits would not be enough to prevent a finding of likeness,

Other relevant elements:

- Substitutability: the extent to which consumers perceive two products as functionally equivalent, measured by the consumer’s willingness to substitute one for the other

Excluded criteria:

- Process and Production Methods: A notable example is the Tuna-Dolphin GATT Case (I and II).
