= ATR.1 certificate =

EU customs document

The ATR.1 Certificate is a customs document used in trade between European Union members and Turkey, to benefit from cheaper rates of duty. The legal basis for the use of the certificate is the EU-Turkey Customs Union. Products not included in the customs union are steel, coal and some agricultural products. Many of these are instead included in the EU-Turkey FTA.

The ATR.1 certificate is a status certificate, not a certificate of origin, and certifies that the product has been put in free circulation either in the European Union or in Turkey, having been imported in either country.

== See also ==
- ATA Carnet
- Certificate of Origin
- EUR.1 movement certificate
- Form A
- Form B
- TIR Carnet
