= EUR.1 movement certificate =

Form used in international commodity traffic

The EUR.1 movement certificate (also known as EUR.1 certificate, or EUR.1) is a form used in international commodity traffic. The EUR.1 is most importantly recognized as a certificate of origin in the external trade in legal sense, especially within the framework of several bi- and multilateral agreements of the Pan-European preference system (the European Union Association Agreement).

== Explanation ==
Each free trade agreement (bi- and multi-lateral) states which products are covered, and which ones can benefit from lower (or none) rates of duty. The condition of "origin" is that the products must have been completely manufactured, processed or transformed in a member country.

=== Issuance ===
The applicant for the EUR.1 (the exporter) must be able to prove the origin of the goods, which is usually done via presentation of the supplier invoice stating the product origin. This is called the supplier's declaration (SD). The exporter then fills in the EUR.1 application form, and hands it over to the competent authorities (usually the customs office) along with the supplier's invoice. The authorities certify the form with a stamp and send it back to the exporter.

=== Use ===
The EUR.1 is used to certify the origin of a product, and if applicable, benefit from favorable trade terms (tariffs mainly) under a preferential trade policy of the EU.

In order to benefit from the preferential rate during a customs clearance, a valid EUR.1 movement certificate must be handed over to the competent authority (likely a customs office), in which the manufacturer certifies the origin of the goods.

In place of a movement certificate, a simple declaration of origin on the invoice can be provided by the manufacturer or sender of the goods in place of a proper movement certificate: this is called an invoice declaration. This is an accepted alternative to the EUR.1 only if the number of items with EU preferential origin under a single shipment does not exceed at certain amount (for a non-approved exporter). If it concerns an approved exporter (that is, a regular authorized exporter), this value limit does not apply.

The EUR.1 is valid between 4 and 10 months.

== Participating countries ==
The following countries participate in trade agreements where the EUR.1 is used:

- in Africa: Tunisia, South Africa, Algeria, Egypt, Morocco, Kenya
- in the Americas: Colombia, Peru, Ecuador, Mexico, Republica Dominicana
- in Europe: Albania, Bosnia and Herzegovina, Faroe Islands, Georgia, Iceland, Liechtenstein, Kosovo, Montenegro, North Macedonia, Norway, Serbia, Switzerland, Republic of Moldova, Ukraine
- in the Middle East: Israel, Palestine, Jordan, Lebanon, Syria
- in the ACP countries, this is regulated through the Cotonou-agreement, which is not a traditional FTA, but rather a non-reciprocal agreement.

== See also ==
- Rules of origin
- ATA Carnet
- ATR.1 certificate
- Certificate of Origin
- TIR Carnet
