= ATR (company) =

ATR International AG
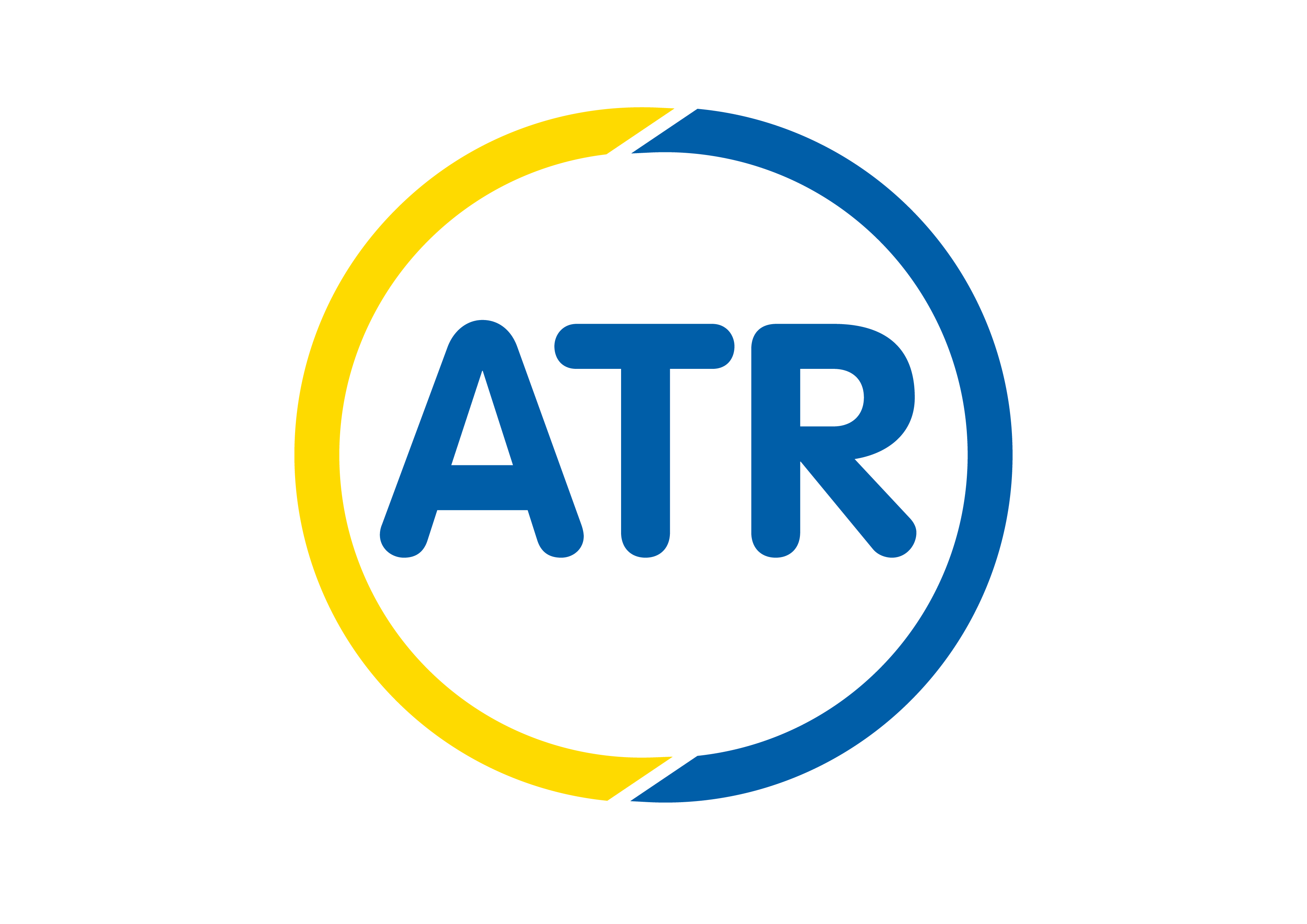
- Type: non-listed Aktiengesellschaft
- Industry: Aftermarket (automotive)
- Founded: 1999
- Headquarters: Denkendorf
- Area served: Worldwide
- Key people: Warren Espinoza (CEO), Henning Kaeß (Managing Director Marketing/ Digitisation), Wolfgang Menges (Managing Director Purchasing/ IT), Terry Knox (Chairman of the Supervisory Board), Mihály Lieb (Chairman of the Supervisory Board), Ziya Özalp, Krzysztof Soszyński, Andrey Soyuznov, Andy Hamilton
- Products: Automotive parts
- Revenue: External revenue: 40,30 billion euros (2024), 38.09 billion euros (2023), 35.46 billion euros (2022)
- Number of employees: > 213,486 worldwide, 33 at Denkendorf headquarters (as of July 2025)
- Website: www.atr.de

ATR (Auto-Teile-Ring, English: “Spare Parts Pool”) is the corporate umbrella of one of the world's largest independent trading cooperations for automotive spare parts and a service center for three garage service concepts. The headquarters of ATR is located in Denkendorf (Baden-Württemberg). ATR companies provide auto shops and spare parts dealers with original spare parts and garage equipment.

== History ==
During the 1950s, a large number of major automotive spare parts dealers in Germany came together to publish a joint catalog of automotive spare parts. From the mid-1960s on, the first gas stations began selling automotive accessories: This created competition for wholesalers that had been generating high revenues through sales of accessories. For that reason, several dealers decided to combine their purchase operations. For this to occur, a joint legal form had to be created. This is how ATR GmbH came about in 1967. ATR founding members included wholesalers Auto Merkur, Auto Staiger, Matthies, Stahlgruber und Wessels. ATR is the eldest trading cooperation for automotive spare parts in Germany. Founding members Johannes J. Matthies GmbH & Co KG in Hamburg and Stahlgruber GmbH in Poing, Bavaria have remained part of ATR until today.

ATR launched its private label brand Cartechnic for garage products and accessories in 1990. Today, the range includes more than 230 products. The wholesalers involved in ATR pushed on with developing a joint catalog after that, though these efforts only gained momentum with electronic data processing. The ATR partners first showcased their electronic spare parts information system ARTis at the Automechanika trade show in 1992.

As sales and purchases of automotive spare parts and accessories in the 1990s gradually turned into a global business, ATR moved with the times and aspired an internationalization. Its first non-German partners were French parts dealer Groupe Laurent (1991) and Spain’s Gerstenmaier (1992). The foundation of ATR International AG in 1999 created the legal framework for the group-purchasing cooperation’s international expansion.

== Facts and figures ==
Today, 45 partners along with 287 trading companies in 68 countries form part of ATR International AG. These include members in the USA, South America, Eastern Europe, Africa, Asia, Australia and New Zealand. ATR has now a presence on six continents.

ATR partner companies employ more than 213,486 employees and operate approx. 11,484 local sales points. All in all, members of ATR International AG generated external revenues of 40,30 billion euros in 2024. ATR is one of the largest revenue generators among purchasing cooperations serving the independent automotive spare parts market globally. The non-listed AG’s 45 partners hold the company’s capital.

== Garage workshops ==
In 2008, ATR consolidated independent garage and specialty store service concepts Meisterhaft and AC AUTO CHECK into ATR SERVICE GmbH, which now comprises more than 1,143 owner-operated workshops (as of July 2025). This makes ATR SERVICE GmbH the largest franchiser of independent multi-brand garages in Germany. With its more than 483 workshops located in Croatia, Czech Republic, Hungary, Portugal, Romania, Serbia and Spain, international garage service concept ACC AUTO CHECK CENTER also forms part of ATR.

== Suppliers ==
ATR suppliers encompass both spare parts manufacturers and original equipment manufacturers such as Bosch, Continental, Hella, Mahle, Schaeffler und ZF Friedrichshafen AG. All in all, ATR works with around 150 suppliers, including companies servicing product groups such as automotive electric equipment, auto-chemicals, automotive accessories, auto body parts, wear parts and tools & workshop equipment.
