= Most favoured nation =

Category of trade relationship

Most favoured nation (MFN) is concept or principle in international economic relations whereby two states that have most favoured nation with one another will provide the same trade advantages (e.g. lower tariffs or higher import quotas) to one another as they would with a third state. In effect, a country that has been accorded MFN status may not be treated less advantageously than any other country with MFN status by the promising country.

The members of the World Trade Organization (WTO) agree to accord MFN status to each other. Exceptions allow for preferential treatment of developing countries, regional free trade areas and customs unions. Together with the principle of national treatment, MFN is one of the cornerstones of WTO trade law. There is a debate in legal circles whether MFN clauses in bilateral investment treaties include only substantive rules or also procedural protections.

"Most favoured nation" relationships extend reciprocal bilateral relationships following both the General Agreement on Tariffs and Trade (GATT) and WTO norms of reciprocity and non-discrimination. In bilateral reciprocal relationships a particular privilege granted by one party only extends to other parties who reciprocate that privilege, while in a multilateral reciprocal relationship the same privilege would be extended to the group that negotiated a particular privilege. The non-discriminatory component of GATT/WTO applies a reciprocally negotiated privilege to all members of GATT/WTO without respect to their status in negotiating the privilege.

== History ==
The most favoured nation status starts to appear in the 18th century, when the division of conditional and unconditional most favoured nation status also began. There were examples of unilateral MFN clauses in 17th century agreements. A 1778 trade treaty between the United States and France was a prominent early example of a conditional most-favoured nation clause. It was common in subsequent trade treaties made by the US. By the mid-19th century, it was heavily used in trade treaties between European states and by Latin American states and Japan.

In the early days of international trade, "most favoured nation" status was usually used on a dual-party, state-to-state basis. A nation could enter into a "most favoured nation" treaty with another nation. In the Treaty of Madrid (1667), Spain granted England "most favoured nation" trading status. With the Jay Treaty in 1794, the US also granted the same to Britain. In the Joseon–United States Treaty of 1882, the Korean kingdom Joseon was compelled by the United States to give it most favoured nation status.

After World War II, tariff and trade agreements were negotiated simultaneously by all interested parties through the General Agreement on Tariffs and Trade (GATT), which ultimately resulted in the World Trade Organization in 1995. The WTO requires members to grant one another "most favoured nation" status. A "most favoured nation" clause is also included in most bilateral investment treaties concluded between capital exporting and capital importing countries after World War II.

== Benefits ==
Trade experts consider MFN clauses to have the following benefits:

- Increases trade creation and decreases trade diversion. A country that grants MFN on imports will have its imports provided by the most efficient supplier if the most efficient supplier is within the group of MFN. Otherwise, that is, if the most efficient producer is outside the group of MFN and additionally, is charged higher rates of tariffs, then it is possible that trade would merely be diverted from this most efficient producer to a less efficient producer within the group of MFN (or with a tariff rate of 0). This leads to economic costs for the importing country, which can outweigh the gains from free trade.
- MFN allows smaller countries, in particular, to participate in the advantages that larger countries often grant to each other, whereas on their own, smaller countries would often not be powerful enough to negotiate such advantages by themselves.
- Granting MFN has domestic benefits: having one set of tariffs for all countries simplifies the rules and makes them more transparent. Theoretically, if all countries in the world confer MFN status to each other, there will be no need to establish complex and administratively costly rules of origin to determine which country a product (that may contain parts from all over the world) must be attributed to for customs purposes. However, if at least one nation lies outside the MFN alliance, then customs cannot be done away with.
- MFN restrains domestic special interests from obtaining protectionist measures. For example, butter producers in country A may not be able to lobby for high tariffs on butter to prevent cheap imports from developing country B, because, as the higher tariffs would apply to every country, the interests of A's principal ally C might get impaired.

As MFN clauses promote non-discrimination among countries, they also tend to promote the objective of free trade in general.

== Exceptions ==
GATT members recognized in principle that the "most favoured nation" rule should be relaxed to accommodate the needs of developing countries, and the UN Conference on Trade and Development (established in 1964) has sought to extend preferential treatment to the exports of the developing countries.

Another exception to the "most favoured nation" principle has been posed by regional trade blocs such as the European Union and the North American Free Trade Agreement (NAFTA), which have lowered or eliminated tariffs among the members while maintaining tariff walls between member nations and the rest of the world. Trade agreements usually allow for exceptions to allow for regional economic integration.

== Revocation ==
WTO rules allow any country to revoke the MFN status that it had previously accorded to another: in particular, Article 21 (National Security) allows it to do so without further explanation.

=== India revokes Pakistani status (2019) ===
In February 2019, following the 2019 Pulwama attack that killed over 40 CRPF personnel, India withdrew the MFN status that it had accorded to Pakistan.

=== G7 revokes Russian status (2022) ===
In March 2022, in response to the 2022 Russian invasion of Ukraine, the G7 countries resolved jointly to withdraw 'most favoured nation' status from Russia and to impose punitive tariffs. In a statement, the group declared that "Russia cannot grossly violate international law and expect to benefit from being part of the international economic order".

== Specific countries' policies ==
=== United States ===
The status of permanent normal trade relations (PNTR) is a legal designation in the United States for free trade with a foreign state. The designation was changed from most favored nation (MFN) to normal trade relations by Section 5003 of the Internal Revenue Service Restructuring and Reform Act of 1998. Permanent was added to normal trade relations some time later.

=== India ===
As per the obligation under their World Trade Organization (WTO) treaties of accession, the member countries of WTO automatically extend most favoured nation (MFN) status to each other unless otherwise specified in the agreement or schedule notified to the WTO by that member country. Pursuant to that provision, India has extended MFN status for goods to most member countries of WTO.

Within the South Asian Association for Regional Cooperation (SAARC), Bangladesh, Maldives, Nepal, Pakistan and Sri Lanka are members of the WTO and all excepting Pakistan have extended MFN status to India, which had extended MFN status to all SAARC countries. In 2019, India revoked its MFN status towards Pakistan. So far as exception to MFN status (if any) is concerned, each member country has indicated the same services in its schedule of services commitments, as notified to the WTO.

== In contract law ==
A most favoured nation clause (also called a most favoured customer clause or most favoured licensee clause) is a contract provision in which a seller (or licensor) agrees to give the buyer (or licensee) the best terms it makes available to any other buyer (or licensee). In some contexts, the use of such clauses may become commonplace, such as when online ebook retailers contract with publishers for the supply of e-books. Use of such clauses, in some contexts, may provoke concerns about anticompetitive influences and antitrust violations, while in other contexts, the influence may be viewed as procompetitive.

One example where most favoured nation clauses may appear is in institutional investment advisory contracts, where if a certain number of conditions are met, one client may be entitled to the lowest fee offered to other clients with a substantially identical investment strategy and the same or lower level of assets under management.

The most favoured nation clause can also be included in an agreement between a state and a company or an investor. This involves the provision of special privileges and advantages although the state cannot use contractual mechanisms to avoid its MFN treatment obligations with other countries. Unlike the relationship among states where a nation accorded an MFN status cannot be treated less advantageously than another, the host nation does not breach MFN treatment if it provides different privileges to different investors. The United Nations Conference on Trade and Development clarified this when it stated that "a host country cannot be obliged to enter into an individual investment contract" and that "freedom of contract prevails over the MFN standard." This general principle, however, is not absolute.

=== European Union ===
The current EU competition law position is that MFN clauses will infringe Article 101(i) if in the individual circumstances of the case result in an appreciable adverse effect on competition in the European Union. This is likely to happen when the parties to the agreement have substantial market power.

It is recognised by EU courts and regulators that such clauses are widely used in a number of industries including most topically with online travel agents. However the regulatory tide in the EU appears to be turning against the use of these clauses. In a number of recent EU cases in the UK and Germany, MFNs have been condemned when used by companies with significant market power.

== See also ==
- Commercial treaty
- Extraterritoriality
- Like product
- Prerogative
- National treatment
- Unequal treaty
