= National treatment =

Principle in international law

National treatment is a principle in international law. Utilized in many treaty regimes involving trade and intellectual property, it requires equal treatment of foreigners and locals. Under national treatment, a state that grants particular rights, benefits or privileges to its own citizens must also grant those advantages to the citizens of other states while they are in that country. In the context of international agreements, a state must provide equal treatment to citizens of the other states participating in the agreement. Imported and locally produced goods should be treated equally — at least after the foreign goods have entered the market.

While this is generally viewed as a desirable principle, in custom it conversely means that a state can deprive foreigners of anything of which it deprives its own citizens. An opposing principle calls for an international minimum standard of justice (a sort of basic due process) that would provide a base floor for the protection of rights and of access to judicial process. The conflict between national treatment and minimum standards has mainly played out between industrialized and developing nations, in the context of expropriations. Many developing nations, having the power to take control over the property of their own citizens, wished to exercise it over the property of aliens as well.

Though support for national treatment was expressed in several controversial (and legally non-binding) United Nations General Assembly resolutions, the issue of expropriations is almost universally handled through treaties with other states and contracts with private entities, rather than through reliance upon international custom.

National treatment only applies once a product, service or item of intellectual property has entered the market. Therefore, charging customs duty on an import is not a violation of national treatment even if locally-produced products are not charged an equivalent tax.

== GATT/WTO ==
National treatment is an integral part of many World Trade Organization agreements. Together with the most favoured nation principle, national treatment is one of the cornerstones of WTO trade law. It is found in all 3 of the main WTO agreements (GATT, GATS and TRIPS).

National treatment is a basic principle of GATT/WTO that prohibits discrimination between imported and domestically produced goods with respect to internal taxation or other government regulation. The principle of national treatment is formulated in Article 3 of the GATT 1947 (and incorporated by reference in GATT 1994); Article 17 of the General Agreement on Trade in Services (GATS); and in Article 3 of the Agreement on Trade-Related Aspects of Intellectual Property Rights (TRIPS). The aim of this trade rule is to prevent internal taxes or other regulations from being used as a substitute for tariff protection.

From the outset, government procurement was excluded from the national treatment obligation.

A good summary is found in Japan-Alcohol which states that "[a] national treatment obligation is a general prohibition on the use of internal taxes and other internal regulatory measures so as to afford protection to domestic production".

== See also ==
- Like product
- Most favoured nation
- Special and differential treatment
- Privileges and Immunities Clause (United States Constitution, Article IV)
