= Rules of origin =

Rules to attribute a country of origin to a product

Rules of origin are the rules to attribute a country of origin to a product in order to determine its "economic nationality". The need to establish rules of origin stems from the fact that the implementation of trade policy measures, such as tariffs, quotas, trade remedies, in various cases, depends on the country of origin of the product at hand. More stringent rules of origin requirements are associated with less trade.

Rules of origin have become a challenging topic in international trade, not only because they constitute a highly technical area of rule-making, but also because their designation and application have not been harmonized across the world. The lack of harmony is even more remarkable in the era of regionalism, when more and more free trade agreements (FTAs) are concluded, creating the spaghetti bowl effect.

== Definition of rules of origin ==
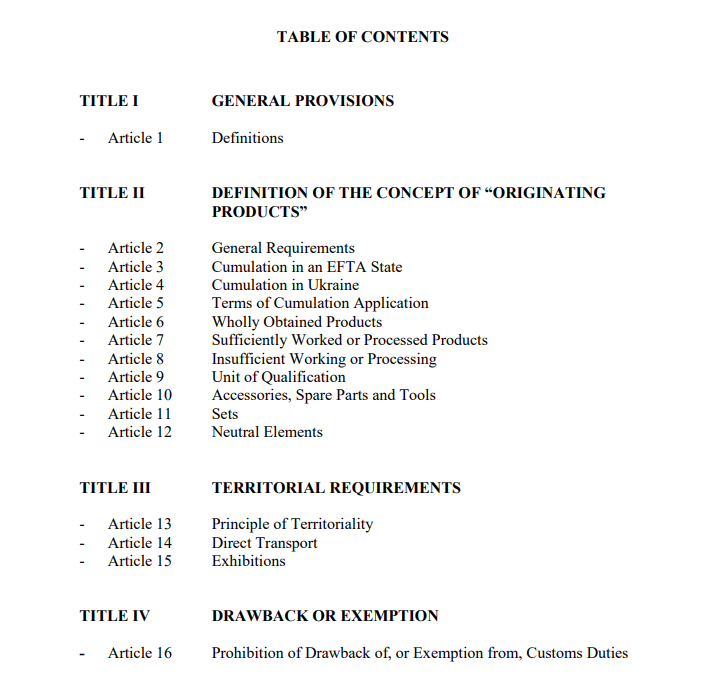
Sample Table of Contents of the Annex on Rules of Origin in an FTA

The most comprehensive definition for rules of origin is found in the International Convention on the Simplification and Harmonization of Customs procedures (Kyoto Convention), which entered into force in 1974 and was revised in 1999. According to Specific Annex K of this Convention:

Rules of origin means the specific provisions, developed from principles established by national legislation or international agreements ("origin criteria"), applied by a country to determine the origin of goods;

The definition makes it clear that rules of origin are basically the "criteria" to determine the origin of goods. Such criteria may be developed from principles in national legislation or international treaties, but the implementation of rules of origin (i.e., certification and verification) is always at the country level. It is also important to note that the purpose of rules of origin is to define the country of origin, not a geographical area such as region or province (which is very important in the field of intellectual property rights). The country of origin is often found in the label or marking of a good, for instance "product of China", "made in Italy", etc.

Considering the modest number of Members of the World Customs Organization (WCO) acceding to Specific Annex K (accession to Specific Annexes is optional), the Kyoto Convention has a rather insignificant impact on the application of rules of origin in international trade. However, this Convention does provide many important definitions and standards, which serve as a harmonized basis for national laws and trade agreements to formulate origin. Apart from the definition for rules of origin, it also provides definitions for "country of origin", "substantial transformation", and a number of recommended practices.

== Classification of rules of origin ==
Rules of origin can be classified into non-preferential rules of origin and preferential rules of origin. Non-preferential rules of origin are those primarily designated in order to sustain the most-favored-treatment (MFN) within the World Trade Organization (WTO). Preferential rules of origin are those associated with "contractual or autonomous trade regimes leading to the granting of tariff preferences going beyond" the MFN application. This separation is stipulated in Article 1 of the WTO's Agreement on Rules of Origin.

Article 1: Rules of Origin

1. For the purposes of Parts I to IV of this Agreement, rules of origin shall be defined as those laws, regulations and administrative determinations of general application applied by any Member to determine the country of origin of goods provided such rules of origin are not related to contractual or autonomous trade regimes leading to the granting of tariff preferences going beyond the application of paragraph 1 of Article I of GATT 1994.

2. Rules of origin referred to in paragraph 1 shall include all rules of origin used in non-preferential commercial policy instruments, such as in the application of: most-favored-nation treatment under Articles I, II, III, XI and XIII of GATT 1994; anti-dumping and countervailing duties under Article VI of GATT 1994; safeguard measures under Article XIX of GATT 1994; origin marking requirements under Article IX of GATT 1994; and any discriminatory quantitative restrictions or tariff quotas. They shall also include rules of origin used for government procurement and trade statistics.

It is important to understand the difference between these two categories of rules of origin. Non-preferential rules of origin are deemed "non-preferential" because they are applied in a non-preferential basis to determine the country of origin for certain purposes of application within the multilateral trading system. In contrast, rules of origin in FTAs and in the Generalized System of Preferences (GSP) is considered preferential because they help to determine the country of origin in order to grant preferential and special treatment to products originating in a contracting party or a beneficiary country.

In principle, FTAs as well as their rules of origin must be notified to the WTO as an obligation of Members. However, rules of origin in FTAs and autonomous trade regimes (e.g., GSP schemes) are not subject to any substantive requirement from the WTO. This is because the Agreement on Rules of Origin does not govern how rules of origin in an FTA or a GSP scheme should be formulated and implemented. There is only a brief Common Declaration with Regard to Preferential Rules of Origin, which sets out some standards and recommendations for the formulation of preferential rules of origin. The fact that preferential rules of origin do not fall within the realm of the WTO adds more divergence to the "spaghetti bowl" of rules of origin: each FTA and each autonomous trade regime may formulate its own rules of origin. As a consequence of the rapid growth of regionalism, hundreds of rules of origin are currently applied in hundreds of FTAs. According to the WTO, as of 4 January 2019, 291 RTAs are in force - counting only those notified to its Secretariat. Whereas, according to the International Trade Centre (ITC), more than 440 FTAs are in force up to the end of March 2019.

Indeed, within the WTO, non-preferential rules of origin are not more harmonized than in FTAs. Despite tremendous effort, the work program to harmonize non-preferential rules of origin has not made significant progress to date, which means there is not yet a common set of rules of origin for non-preferential purposes within the WTO. During the so-called "transitional period", the formulation and implementation of non-preferential rules are literally at the discretion of Members. The only difference as compared to preferential rules of origin is that non-preferential rules of origin are subject to more binding requirements in WTO agreements, particularly the Agreement on Rules of Origin and the Agreement on Trade Facilitation.

So far, the most successful initiative to harmonize this area of rule-making at the multilateral level is the WTO's implementation of preferential rules of origin in favor of least developed countries (LDCs). The 2015 Nairobi Decision on Preferential Rules of Origin for LDCs, which is built upon the decision adopted earlier at the Hong Kong Ministerial Conference, has for the first time laid out general guidelines and detailed instructions on specific issues to determine the status of products originating in an LDC country. Moreover, preference-granting Members are required to notify to the Secretariat of their prevalent origin criteria and other origin requirements. To enable transparency and comparability, such notifications must also follow a template adopted by the WTO's Committee on Rules of Origin.

== The role of rules of origin in international trade ==
Being the criteria to determine the economic nationality of goods, the role of rules of origin is inherently derived from the fact that a number of trade policy measures are applied based on the source of the imports. For instance, if country A wants to impose anti-dumping duties on steel products originating from country B, it is when rules of origin come into play. Without rules of origin, country A cannot apply this measure properly because it cannot determine whether or not the steel in a certain consignment is "made in country B". Beyond this fundamental issue, when steel products originating from country C only transit through country B, they should not be subject to this trade remedy measure; but when steel products of country B opt to transit through country C before being entering country A, it should be considered a circumvention of the anti-dumping duties. All these issues give rise to the need to formulate and implement rules of origin. Basically, rules of origin allow the application of trade measures to the right subject-matters whenever their nationality is taken into account. Likewise, rules of origin are crucial to trade statistics because a country may need to keep track of their trade balance with partners.

Rules of origin are particularly important in FTAs, which are established to provide preferences exclusively to products of preferential origin. In this context, rules of origin are indispensable to differentiate between goods originating in contracting parties and those originating in third countries. Such differentiation serves two purposes: (1) it allows the importing party to determine whether a product is eligible for preferential treatment under the FTA at hand; (2) it avoids the scenario where exports from third countries enter the FTA via the member with the lowest external tariff (i.e., trade deflection). This explains why in a customs union, there is no need to establish rules of origin among its contracting parties - members of a customs union are required to maintain a common external tariff imposed on imports from third countries.

Due to such role, rules of origin also help to create trade among members of a preferential trade arrangement. Such trade creation effect may happen through two channels. Firstly, because preferences are destined exclusively for goods originating in partner countries, it follows that one party tends to increase its imports from another party of an FTA. To illustrate, if country A signs an FTA with country B, due to lower duties, product X originating in country B now becomes cheaper than similar product X' originating in country C; therefore, country A has the incentive to import a higher volume of X. Secondly, inputs originating in a partner country are also preferred because they are normally considered as originating in the other party where it is incorporated in production. It means country A has the incentive to use inputs originating in country B because this will allow its products to qualify for the originating status under the FTA with country B more easily. Both channels may lead to an increased trade between country A and country B, but may also have an adverse effect on their trade with country C (i.e., trade diversion). Therefore, although rules of origin help to overcome trade deflection and encourage trade creation, it also causes trade diversion, which in many cases is not economically efficient.

Rules of origin also redistribute among firms, not only among countries. Because they set requirements that a product must satisfy regardless of how many units are sold, compliance is a fixed cost that weighs more heavily on smaller and less productive exporters. Research on the North American Free Trade Agreement has found that its rules of origin for automobiles raised the cost of using non-North American inputs and shifted sourcing toward the member states. İpek Çınar and Robert Gulotty argue that uncertainty over what the automotive rules of origin would require during the 1992 NAFTA talks deterred non-North American automakers from committing to new assembly plants in Mexico, while the most integrated producers, led by the three large US automakers, announced new investments, so that ostensibly firm-neutral rules shifted market share toward the largest incumbents.

== Origin criteria ==
Rules of origin attempt to reflect the practice of trade and production. It is apparent that a product may be obtained or produced by only one country, but it can also be a product manufactured with the contribution of several countries. Therefore, the criteria to determine the origin of goods - the most important element in any set of rules of origin - are designated to reflect these two circumstances.

=== Wholly obtained or produced products ===
'Wholly obtained' refers mainly to natural products grown, harvested etc., in a Party (country or territory) and to products made entirely from them. Normally in FTAs and GSP schemes, these products are indicated either by means of a general definition or by means of an exhaustive list. The second method is more commonly found, and it is also considered to be more transparent.

Specific Annex K to the Revised Kyoto Convention provides a list of wholly obtained or produced products, which can be taken as a good example for the second method:

2. Standard

Goods produced wholly in a given country shall be taken as originating in that country. The following only shall be taken to be produced wholly in a given country:

a. mineral products extracted from its soil, from its territorial waters or from its sea-bed;

b. vegetable products harvested or gathered in that country;

c. live animals born and raised in that country;

d. products obtained from live animals in that country;

e. products obtained from hunting or fishing conducted in that country;

f. products obtained by maritime fishing and other products taken from the sea by a vessel of that country;

g. products obtained aboard a factory ship of that country solely from products of the kind covered by paragraph (f) above;

h. products extracted from marine soil or subsoil outside that country's territorial waters, provided that the country has sole rights to work that soil or subsoil;

i. scrap and waste from manufacturing and processing operations, and used articles, collected in that country and fit only for the recovery of raw materials;

j. goods produced in that country solely from the products referred to in paragraphs (a) to (ij) above.

Although the lists of wholly obtained products are more or less identical across agreements, there are yet several subtle differences. For instance, a few agreements consider animals raised in one country as wholly obtained in that country, while most agreements require them to be born and raised there. Besides, most agreements include in these list only products obtained in one single country, while some agreements also consider an article as wholly obtained if it is made entirely from inputs originating in one or more than one partner countries.

=== Not wholly obtained products ===
In the ‘substantial transformation’ criterion, ‘origin is determined by regarding as the country of origin the country where the last substantial manufacturing or processing, deemed sufficient to give a commodity its essential character, has been carried out.’ In other words, once a product is made up of inputs from several countries, it obtains originating status in the country that hosts the substantial works giving it an essential character. There is a possibility that works carried out in different countries may give the product equally essential characters; in that case, the last one shall be credited. There are several methods of application to identify the fulfillment of the ‘substantial transformation’ criterion, which include rules that are based (i) on the change in tariff classification, (ii) the ad valorem percentage, or (iii) the list of specific manufacturing or processing operations. All of these interchangeable methods have certain positives and negatives, and they can be applied separately or in combination.

==== The 'value added' rule ====
This method takes into account the degree of manufacturing or processing carried out in a country by calculating the value it adds to the products. If the value added meets a certain threshold, denoted as a percentage, the manufacturing or processing shall be considered substantial or sufficient, thereby allowing the goods to acquire originating status in the country where such manufacturing or processing takes place. A rule based on the value added requirement may be expressed in one of the following tests:

(i) Minimum percentage of the value added to final products (build-up or direct test): The manufacturing or processing operations carried out in the country of origin must reach a certain extent, i.e., the percentage of value they add to the final products must be equal to or exceed a given threshold, so that the latter can obtain origin there. This test requires a consideration between the value of regionally or locally created content and that of the final goods. As a result, the stringency of rules of origin would increase with the threshold for regional or domestic content. For instance, a rule requiring 40% regional value content will be more stringent than one requiring 35%.

(ii) Maximum percentage of non-originating inputs (build-down or indirect test): The use of non-originating materials or components in the processing or manufacturing in the country of origin is restricted to a maximum rate. This test relies on a comparison between the value of non-originating inputs and that of the final goods. Therefore, the stringency of rules of origin would be inversely proportional to the allowance of non-originating inputs. To illustrate, a rule authorizing 60% value of final products to come from non-originating materials is more stringent than one permitting 65%.

==== Change of tariff classification ====
Among those three methods of application to express the ‘substantial transformation’ criterion, change in tariff classification is regarded by the Agreement on Rules of Origin as the primary method. In its Article 9 on the objectives and principles of harmonizing rules of origin, the Agreement on Rules of Origin divides ‘substantial transformation’ into two groups, in which ‘change in tariff classification’ stands apart, while the other methods are categorized as ‘supplementary’. This Article points out that to ensure the timely completion of the harmonization work program, it ‘shall be conducted on a product sector basis, as represented by various chapters or sections of the Harmonized System (HS) nomenclature.’ Only where the usage of the nomenclature does not enable a proper expression of ‘substantial transformation’ shall the Technical Committee on Rules of Origin consider elaborating on ‘the use, in a supplementary or exclusive manner, of other requirements, including ad valorem percentages and/or manufacturing or processing operations.’

==== Specific manufacturing or processing operations ====
This method dictates specific production processes that may confer originating status to the goods. It requires non-originating materials to go through certain processing or manufacturing operations in a country in order for the good to be deemed originating in that country. Although the Revised Kyoto Convention has dropped this method, it is still commonly used in practice: the often cited ‘from yarn forward’ rule is a good example. As a matter of fact, this method is acknowledged by the Agreement on Rules of Origin. Article 2(a)(iii) of the agreement states that in cases where this method is used, the operations conferring origin on the goods in question need to be precisely specified.

== General origin provisions ==
Apart from the core origin criteria, rules of origin also comprise general provisions which cover other aspects in origin determination. They are referred to as general previsions because they are applied across the board, and not specific to any product. Although there is no harmony across trade agreements, the Comparative Study on Rules of Origin of the WCO has listed the most commonly found provisions of this category. Based on this study, the following glossary is provided by the International Trade Centre as a brief guideline for enterprises.

Accessories, Spare Parts and Tools: A provision that clarifies the origin determination process of accessories, spare parts or tools delivered with the good.

Advance rulings: A provision that allows an exporter or an importer to obtain an official and legally binding opinion on the classification, origin or customs value of their products from the local customs authorities prior to exporting/importing of the goods.

Appeals: A provision which sets up an appeal process in respect of origin determination and advanced rulings.

Approved exporter: Approved exporter provision refers to exporters who fulfil certain conditions, export frequently under and FTA and are registered with the local customs authorities (have obtained an approved exporter authorization).

Certification: A provision that details the type of origin documentation that needs to be provided to claim preferential tariffs under an FTA.

Competent authority: A provision that lists national authorities responsible for overseeing origin-related provisions and for issuing the certificate of origin. This is often the government or a government department which can then delegate the procedure of issuing certificates to other domestic organisations.

Cumulation: A provision which allows to consider goods obtained in as well as processing taking place in one FTA member country as originating in another.

De Minimis: A provision that allows a small amount of non-originating materials to be used in the production of the good without affecting its originating status. The provision acts as the relaxation of the rules of origin.

Direct transport: A provision requiring goods that are claiming preferential treatment under an FTA to be shipped directly from the FTA country of origin to the FTA country of destination.

Duty drawback: A provision that relates to reclaims or refunds of customs duties previously paid on inputs. In the context of FTAs, duty drawback provision, usually relates to the ability to claim back duties paid on non-originating materials used to produce the final good which is exported under preferential tariffs.

Exemption of certification: A provision which lists exemptions from the requirement to provide a proof of origin. Under certain circumstances originating goods can be imported into an FTA country without a proof of origin and still be treated as originating.

Exhibitions: A provision which allows an originating good to be purchased in a third party (non-FTA) country during an exhibition and imported into an FTA country under preferential treatment.

Fungible materials: A provision determining how non-originating and originating fungible materials should be tracked (accounted for) when both types are stored together and/or used to produce originating and non-originating goods. It allows both types of goods to be tracked not through physical identification and separation but based on an accounting or inventory management system.

Indirect materials: A provision which specifies that the origin of certain materials (referred to as indirect or neutral) used in the production process should not be taken into account when determining the origin of the final good.

Minor errors: A provision that clarifies that when the origin of the goods is not in question, preferential origin claims should not be rejected as a result of small administrative errors and discrepancies.

Non-qualifying operations: A provision that lists operations which do not confer origin. They are considered below the threshold of sufficient production / processing.

Outward processing: A provision that allows a good to be temporarily removed from the FTA territory and processed in the third party country without affecting origin determination of the final product. No account is taken of the fact that the good has left the territory of an FTA during the production process.

Packaging: A provision that clarifies whether packaging should be accounted for when determining the origin of the product.

Penalties: A provision that specifies the legal consequences of submitting an origin documentation based on incorrect or falsified information. These can relate to criminal, civil and administrative penalties.

Period of validity: A provision that specifies the length of time an origin certificate or an origin declaration (see proof of origin) is valid for from the moment it has been issued.

Principle of Territoriality:

A provision stating that for the purpose of determining the origin of goods, all working and processing needs to be carried out within the territory of parties to the agreement without interruption.

== Origin certification and verification ==
Certification and verification are procedural aspects of rules of origin, but they are of no less importance. Even if a product fulfills the substantive origin criteria, it will not be entitled to preferences unless it complies with the procedural requirements. The requirements regarding certification and verification are usually provided in an annexes called operational procedures, or sometimes in the chapters on customs procedures. Those annexes or chapters include a number of provisions such as retention of documents, refund of excess duties paid, minor errors, etc., which need to be taken into account if traders want to claim preferences for their goods.

Most essentially, to be eligible for preferential treatment, a consignment must be accompanied by a proof of origin. The most popular form of proof of origin required in most trade agreements is a certificate of origin. Besides, there are other forms of proof of origin, for instance, a declaration of origin or an origin statement. Many agreements provide value thresholds below which proofs of origin may be waived.

Regarding certification, a trader needs to know whether or not self-certification is permitted by the trade agreement under which he claims preferences. If it is permitted, the trader (either the producer, the exporter, or in some cases, the importer) only needs to fill out the information relating to the consignment on a prescribed form (if any), and declare that the goods listed therein fulfill origin criteria and other requirements. However, if self-certification is not allowed, a trader must apply for a proof of origin issued by a certifying authority, which is normally the chamber of commerce or an agency of the ministry of trade or commerce. To obtain such document, the exporter or the producer will submit various documents relating to the production or manufacturing of the goods. The competent authority will examine the documents, and pay visits to an applicant's premise to verify if necessary, and certify if the goods are compliant with the origin criteria set out in the trade agreement at hand.

Regarding verification, when the consignment arrives at the port of entry in the importing country, the proof of origin will be submitted to the customs authority. To facilitate trade, sometimes a physical submission is not required - the importer or its representative may simply submit the document number and/or an electronic copy thereof. The customs' acceptance of the proof of origin will decide whether or not the consignment is entitled to preferential treatment. In case there arise some doubts, the customs authority may resort to several measures, e.g. examining the original proof or origin or verifying the information on the document and the goods actually imported. The customs may require the trader to provide more information, or even contact the issuing authority in the exporting country for further clarification.

== Institutions and Rules of Origin ==
=== Domestic institutions ===
Because rules of origin are implemented at the country level, it is domestic institutions which directly deal with the certification and verification procedures. The competent authorities differ from one country to another, and also vary across trade agreements.

==== Issuing authorities ====
An issuing authority may be one of the following institutions:

- Chamber of commerce
- Specific government authority assigned by a trade agreement and/or domestic legislation
- Customs authority

To cite an example, in Vietnam, goods exported to an importing country under non-preferential regime may need a non-preferential certificate of origin certified by the Vietnamese Chamber of Commerce and Industry. The Chamber is also responsible for issuing preferential certificate of origin form A if the goods are exported to a GSP-granting country. However, if the goods are traded under an FTA, the issuing authority will be a local Office of Import and Export Administration, directly under the Ministry of Industry and Trade.

==== Verifying authorities ====
Verifying authorities are in principle the customs authorities in importing countries unless otherwise specified. The reason is that the verification of origin in the importing country must be carried out when the goods arrive at the port of entry in order to determine the (preferential) duties applied to the consignment, which falls within the realm of its customs. Particularly, in many agreements, the customs are indicated as both the certifying and the verifying authorities.

=== International organizations ===
International organizations are not the institutions dealing directly with traders. However, they have very important roles in forming, administering and facilitating the application of rules of origin.

==== World Trade Organization ====
The World Trade Organization (WTO) is administering the Agreement on Rules of Origin. It holds committees on Rules of Origin. Although most of the work at the WTO concern non-preferential rules of origin, the current initiative on rules of origin for LDCs is an important work that the WTO is carrying on. It requires the Members which commit under the Ministerial Declarations to submit notifications regarding their rules of origin in preferential treatment for LDCs. The WTO webpage on non-preferential rules of origin provides an archive of documents relating to non-preferential rules of origin in Members. It also provide a database on preferential rules of origin notified under the LDC initiative.

Besides, the WTO's new Trade Facilitation Agreement also provides new benchmarks for the customs-related aspects in implementing rules of origin. For instance, Article of this agreement provides that each member shall issue an advance ruling on the origin of goods "in a reasonable, time-bound manner to the applicant that has submitted a written request containing all necessary information".

==== World Customs Organization ====
The World Customs Organization (WCO) administers many important conventions that relate to rules of origin, for instance the Revised Kyoto Convention. It also administers the Harmonized System, which is the basis to construct tariff schedules and also the basis to determine the origin of goods when the "tariff jump" rule is applied. The WCO is jointly in charge of the Technical Committee on Rules of Origin. As provided for by Article 4.2 of the WTO Agreement on Rules of Origin, "the Technical Committee is a WTO body, but it has operated under the auspices of the WCO as provided for under Article 4.2 of the Origin Agreement. Therefore, the WCO Council exercises its supervision over the Technical Committee with regard to administrative matters only." The WCO also publishes a number of guidelines and studies on different aspects of rules of origin, which are very helpful for enterprises. For instance, the WCO Origin Compendium (2017) and the Comparative Study on Preferential Rules of Origin (version 2017).

==== International Trade Centre ====
In a joint initiative with the WCO and WTO, the International Trade Centre introduces Rules of Origin Facilitator, which provides free and user-friendly access to ITC’s database of rules of origin and origin-related documentation in hundreds of trade agreements. The Facilitator is also combined with the tariff and trade agreements databases that have been constructed and maintained by ITC’s Market Access Map since 2006, resulting in a market intelligence solution enabling companies, particularly ones from developing countries, to benefit from trade agreements worldwide. The Facilitator currently contains data for more than 230 FTAs applied by more than 190 countries, as well as non-preferential regimes of the EU, the USA, and Switzerland. This database is gradually expanding with a goal to cover over 400 FTAs and preferential schemes that are currently active in the world.

The Rules of Origin Facilitator aims to help small and medium-sized enterprises to increase trade by taking advantage of global trade opportunities in the form of low duty rates under trade agreements. The tool can also be used by policymakers, trade negotiators, economists as well as any other users. Any user can simply look for information on origin criteria, other origin provisions, and trade documentation by entering the HS code of their product.

==== International Chamber of Commerce ====
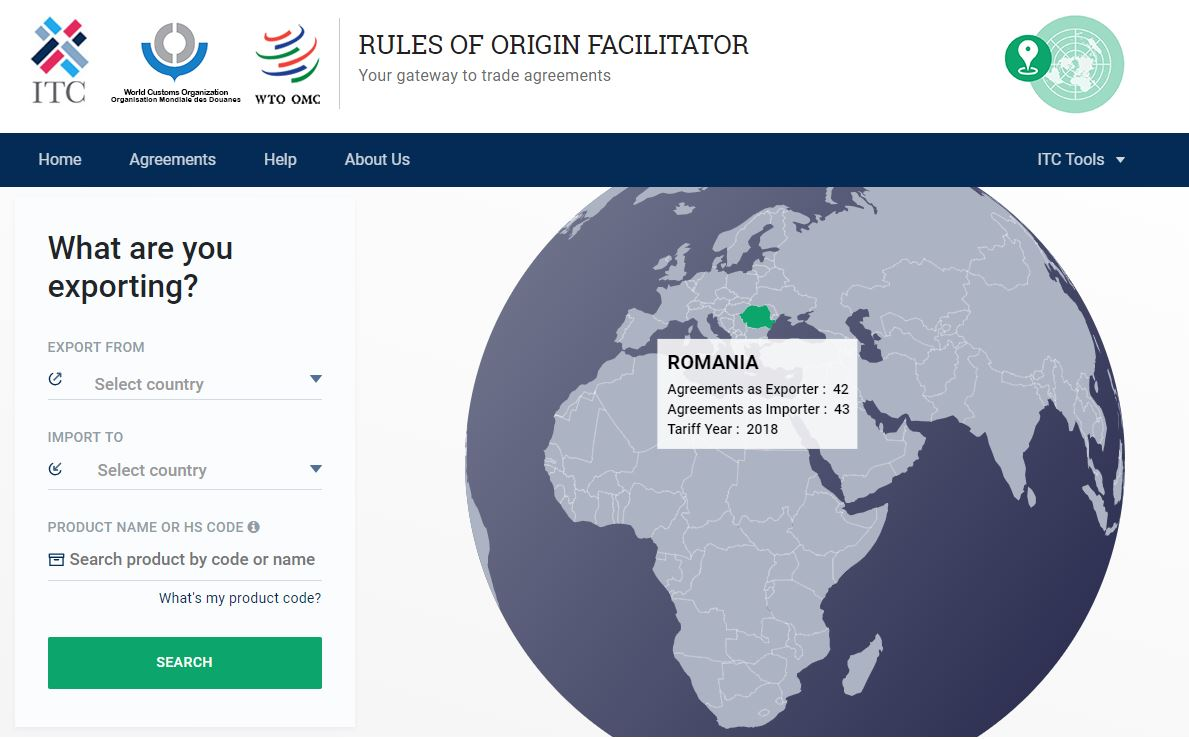
The Rules of Origin Facilitator

The International Chamber of Commerce (ICC) is not directly dealing with paperwork submitted by traders, but this, the world's largest business organization, is contributing a lot to the works of chambers of commerce in countries — which means they are improving the work of issuing authorities.

Following the 1923 Geneva Convention, governments have been delegating the issuance of certificate of origin to chambers. Chambers are deemed to be competent organisations and regarded as an accountable and reliable third-party with neutrality and impartiality. The ICC's World Chambers Federation Council on International Certificate of Origin (ICO) was established to enhance and promote the unique position of chambers as the natural agent in the issuance of trade documents. The Federation has established a universal set of procedures for issuing and attesting certificates by chambers all over the world.
