= Harberger-Laursen-Metzler effect =

Harberger-Laursen-Metzler effect is the conjecture that a terms of trade deterioration will cause a decrease in savings and a deterioration of the current account. This is due to the decrease in real income, which will cause an increase in real expenditure (in order to maintain a standard of living). The theory was offered by Harberger (1950) and Laursen and Metzler (1950).

== See also ==
- Terms of trade
- Prebisch–Singer hypothesis
