= Hans Singer =

German-British economist (1910–2006)

Sir Hans Singer
- Born: Hans Wolfgang Singer; 29 November 1910; Elberfeld, German Empire
- Died: 26 February 2006 (aged 95); Brighton, England
- Spouse: Ilse Plaut (m. 1933; died 2001)

Scholarly background
- Education: University of Bonn; King's College, Cambridge
- Academic advisors: Colin Clark; Joseph Schumpeter; Arthur Spiethoff
- Influences: John Maynard Keynes; William Temple

Scholarly work
- Discipline: Economics
- Sub-discipline: Development economics
- School or tradition: Structuralist economics
- Institutions: United Nations; University of Sussex
- Notable ideas: Prebisch–Singer thesis
- Influenced: Rudolf Meidner

Sir Hans Wolfgang Singer (29 November 1910 – 26 February 2006) was a German-born British development economist best known for the Prebisch-Singer thesis, which states that the terms of trade move against producers of primary products. He is one of the primary figures of heterodox economics.

== Early life ==
He was born in Elberfeld, Germany (then the German Empire) on 29 November 1910. A German Jew, Singer had intended to become a medical doctor before he was inspired to study economics after attending a series of lectures by prominent economists Joseph Schumpeter and Arthur Spiethoff in Bonn. Singer fled the rise of Adolf Hitler in 1933, arriving in the United Kingdom as a refugee.

== Career ==
In 1933, Schumpeter convinced John Maynard Keynes of Cambridge University to accept Singer as one of his first PhD candidates, and Singer received his doctorate in 1936. His first academic post was in Manchester where he stayed from 1938 until 1944. Under Keynes, he produced two papers in 1937 and 1940 studying unemployment. Keynes had also helped secure Singer's speedy release after his former student was interned by the British government at the start of the Second World War. In 1938, Singer applied for British citizenship, listing as references Keynes, William Beveridge, William Temple, and the vice-chancellor of Manchester University. His request was granted in 1946.

There, he authored the 1949 UN publication on Relative prices of exports and imports of under-developed countries, where he noted that the terms of trade for primary products had been declining for more than half a century, reversing the improving trend before 1870. Theoretically, this could happen if productivity increased faster in primary production than in industry, but this was hardly plausible. Instead, this meant that "the underdeveloped countries helped to maintain, in the prices which they paid for their imports, a rising standard of living in the industrialized countries, without receiving, in the price of their own products, a corresponding equivalent contribution towards their own standard of living". Raul Prebisch read this report in manuscript form and incorporated both the data and the conclusions into his own report for the UN Commission for Latin America. Singer's controversial conclusions were rejected by the subcommission and this was the reason why Prebisch in turn avoided the general fate of UN authors to remain anonymous, the idea being to present the views as belonging to the individual author rather than being the objective, officially sanctioned position of the UN. When Singer henceforth wanted to express these views, he too had to publish under his own name, which he did in a 1950 article on the costs of international trade.

This drew criticism from fellow economists Jacob Viner and Gottfried Haberler and led to his fame as co-originator with Raul Prebisch for the Prebisch-Singer thesis. Since, it was well-known at the time that Singer was the author of the 1949 UN publication on relative prices, it was also referred to as the Singer-Prebisch theorem, to indicate the primacy of authorship. The fundamental claim of the hypothesis is that poorer nations that specialise in primary products such as raw materials and agricultural products will become the losers from the terms of trade when exchanging their goods for manufactures from rich industrialised nations. The theorem posed, and the falling terms of trade showed, that productivity gains made by the primary producer generated lower prices for industrial consumers, while productivity gains by industrial nations were reflected in greater output but not in lower export prices for industrial goods. In this exchange, all of the benefits of international trade went to the wealthy industrial nations, both as consumers and as producers.

As a result, Singer was a passionate advocate for increased foreign aid in a variety of forms to the developing world to offset the disproportionate gain to developed nations of trade. He attempted to create a "soft-loan" fund to offer loans at interest rates below market rates to be administered by the United Nations, but it was systematically blocked by the United States and the United Kingdom, which wished to retain control of money flowing out of the UN. He was thus considered "one of the wild men of the UN" by Eugene R. Black Sr. of the World Bank and American Senator Eugene McCarthy. His ideas were influential in the establishment of the bank's International Development Association, the United Nations Development Programme, and the World Food Programme.

Fellow economist Sir Alec Cairncross has said of Singer, "There are few of the developing countries that he has not visited and still fewer that he has not advised. He must have addressed a wider variety of academics and a wider variety of places about a wider variety of subjects than any other economist, living or dead." Singer, like Prebisch, was influential on neo-Marxist development theorists such as Paul Baran and Andre Gunder Frank, although these focused on transfers of profits as a mechanism of exploitation rather than the terms of trade. However, he was not normally considered a neo-Marxist himself and did not consider himself one.

== Later life ==
In 1969, he left the UN to join the influential Institute of Development Studies (IDS) at the University of Sussex in England. He produced about 30 books under his name and nearly 300 other publications. The International Institute of Social Studies (ISS) awarded its honorary fellowship to Hans Singer in 1977. Singer was knighted by Queen Elizabeth II in 1994. In 2001 the UN World Food Programme awarded him the Food for Life award in recognition of his contribution to the battle against world hunger. In November 2004, Singer was awarded the first Lifetime Achievement Award from the Development Studies Association.

Singer died in Brighton on 26 February 2006.

== Legacy ==
In commemoration and in honour of Sir Hans Singer the German Development Institute and the Institute of Development Studies initiated the Hans Singer Memorial Lecture on Global Development, which alternates between Bonn and Brighton on an annual basis. The first memorial lecture was given by the renowned development economist Paul Collier of the University of Oxford in May 2009 in Bonn. The second lecture was held in October 2010 in Brighton with Jomo Kwame Sundaram, Assistant Secretary General of the United Nations Economic Commission for Africa (UNECA). The third memorial lecture was given by Stephen Chan of the School of Oriental and African Studies at University of London in November 2011 at the German Development Institute in Bonn.
