= Export-oriented industrialization =

Development strategy based on global trade

Export-oriented industrialization (EOI), sometimes called export substitution industrialization (ESI), export-led industrialization (ELI), or export-led growth, is a trade and economic policy aiming to speed up the industrialization process of a country by exporting goods for which the nation has a comparative advantage. The basic principle of export-oriented industrialization (EOI) is that nations can generate foreign exchange, employment opportunities, and foreign investment through the export of goods, thereby fostering further economic growth and development.

Export-led growth implies opening domestic markets to foreign competition in exchange for market access in other countries. However, that may not be true of all domestic markets, as governments may aim to protect specific nascent industries so that they grow and can exploit their future comparative advantage, and in practice, the converse can occur. For example, many East Asian countries had strong barriers on imports from the 1960s to the 1980s.

Reduced tariff barriers, a fixed exchange rate (a devaluation of national currency is often employed to facilitate exports), and government support for exporting sectors are all an example of policies adopted to promote EOI and ultimately economic development. Export-oriented industrialization was particularly characteristic of the development of the national economies of the developed East Asian Tigers: Hong Kong, Singapore, South Korea, and Taiwan in the post-World War II period.

Export-led growth is an economic strategy used by some developing countries. The strategy seeks to find a niche in the world economy for a certain type of export. Industries producing this export may receive governmental subsidies and better access to the local markets. By implementing that strategy, countries hope to gain enough hard currency to import commodities manufactured more cheaply elsewhere.

== Origins ==
From the Great Depression to the years after World War II, under-developed and developing countries started to have a hard time economically. During this time, many foreign markets were closed and the danger of trading and shipping in war-time waters drove many of these countries to look for another solution to development. The initial solution to this dilemma was called import substitution industrialization. Both Latin American and Asian countries used this strategy at first. However, during the 1950s and 1960s the Asian countries, like Taiwan and South Korea, started focusing their development outward, resulting in an export-led growth strategy. Many of the Latin American countries continued with import substitution industrialization, just expanding its scope. Some have pointed out that because of the success of the Asian countries, especially Taiwan and South Korea, export-led growth should be considered the best strategy to promote development.

== Significance ==
Export-led growth is important for mainly two reasons: The first is that export-led growth improves the country's foreign-currency finances, as well as surpass their debts as long as the facilities and materials for the exports exist. The second, if more debatable reason, is that increased export-growth can trigger greater productivity, thus creating even more exports in a positive, upward spiral cycle.

The nomenclature of this concept appears in J.S.L McCombie et al. (1994):

y_{B} denotes the relationship between expenditures and income in foreign-currency trade; it marks the balance of payments constraint

y_{A} is the growth capacity of the country, which can never be more than the current capacity

y_{C} is the current capacity of growth, or how well the country is producing at that moment

(i) y_{B}=y_{A}=y_{C}: balance-of-payments equilibrium and full employment

(ii) y_{B}=y_{A}<y_{C}: balance-of-payments equilibrium and growing unemployment

(iii)y_{B}<y_{A}=y_{C}: increasing balance-of-payments deficit and full employment

(iv) y_{B}<y_{A}<y_{C}: increasing balance-of-payments deficit and growing unemployment

(v) y_{B}>y_{A}=y_{C}: increasing balance-of-payments surplus and full employment

(vi) y_{B}>y_{A}<y_{C}: increasing balance-of-payments surplus and growing unemployment (McCombie 423)

Countries with both unemployment and balance-of-payments problems are supposed, according to the dominant economic paradigm, to orient their policies towards export-led growth aiming to achieve either situation (i) or situation (v).

In addition, a mathematical study shows that export-led growth has wage growth being repressed and linked to the productivity growth of nontradable goods in a country with undervalued currency. In such a country, the productivity growth of export goods is greater than the proportional wage growth and the productivity growth of nontradable goods. Thus, export price decreases in the export-led growth country and makes it more competitive in international trade.

== Types of exports ==
There are essentially two types of exports used in this context: manufactured goods and raw materials.

Manufactured goods are the exports most commonly used to achieve export-led growth. However, many times these industries are competing against industrialized countries' industries, which often have better technology, better educated workers, and more capital to start with—therefore, the industrialised countries have a comparative advantage. Thus, export-led industrialisation through manufactured goods has tended to involve significant government intervention to support infant industries as well as protectionism (through the likes of tariffs) to reduce the relative competitiveness of imports and to incentivise import substitution. Generally speaking, export-led growth has also involved the suppression of domestic demand in order to maximise investment and productivity. This has particularly been the case for countries such as South Korea, Taiwan, China, and Japan.

Raw materials are another export option. However, this strategy is risky compared to manufactured goods. If the terms of trade shift unfavorably, a country must export more and more of the raw materials to import the same amount of commodities, making the trade profits very difficult to come by. Most of the time, manufactured and raw material exports result in different development outcomes. Manufacturing industries are also likely to foster linkages with other sectors of the economy, creating a positive feedback loop for investment, increasing participation in global value chains, encouraging technological learning, improving productivity, and generating jobs. They also encourage skills development and the adoption of advanced technologies and production methods.

Manufactured exports have been viewed as a key channel of long-term economic development in many export-oriented economies because they can help to shift labour and resources from less productive sectors to more productive ones and lead to higher incomes, rising government revenues and the supply of supporting industries like transportation, logistics, finance and business services. In contrast, economies heavily dependent on raw material exports tend to be more sensitive to fluctuations of commodity prices in the world market, because commodity price cycles tend to be volatile, and reliance on a limited number of raw material-based activities can be a hindrance to industrial development and to the ability to withstand economic shocks outside the economy. In some cases, heavy dependence on raw material exports can discourage investment in other productive sectors and slow economic diversification.

The quality of the export portfolio and the variety of export items have been regarded as important determinants in export-led growth strategies emanating several dimensions of export diversification such as reduced economic risk, increased economic resilience to foreign market fluctuations, more stable long-term export growth and promotion of innovative products, increment of industries, and limited reliance on a single source of export revenue.

== EOI practical cases ==
=== Southeast Asia ===
Export-oriented industrialization (EOI) policies were prevalent in Southeast Asia, particularly in Hong Kong, Singapore, Taiwan, and South Korea, between 1970 and 1985. South Korea’s export-oriented policies have been an important factor in the country’s economic growth and development. By focusing on exports, South Korea has been able to access global markets and generate revenue from overseas sales. This has contributed to an increase in the country’s foreign exchange reserves, strengthened its financial position, and supported economic growth and development. The government has also implemented policies to promote free trade and open markets, including signing free trade agreements with other countries and encouraging international cooperation and competitiveness. South Korea’s export-oriented policies are generally considered consistent with economic liberalism, as they emphasize the role of open markets and free trade in promoting economic growth and development.

In addition to emphasising the development of a skilled workforce, South Korea’s export-oriented policies also placed emphasis on funding education and training. The government supported technical education and vocational training programmes, which contributed to the development of a highly qualified workforce capable of producing high-quality goods. Strategic planning and cooperation within South Korea also contributed to the success of its export-oriented policies. The government identified the automotive and electronics industries as important sectors for growth and supported them through research and development (R&D), marketing, and export promotion. The government also worked closely with the private sector to create a business environment that encouraged investment and entrepreneurship.

=== China ===
The emergence of the Pearl River Delta (PRD) as a major manufacturing centre in China's export-oriented economy has been attributed to export-oriented industrialization, which was primarily driven by investment from overseas Chinese communities in Hong Kong and Taiwan beginning in the late 1970s. A substantial body of literature has examined how the PRD model was embedded in flexible local institutions that favoured investors from Hong Kong and Taiwan. These institutions facilitated a prominent form of market entry, namely processing with supplied materials (lailiaojiagong), which became widespread in the PRD and was based on cultural affinity and interpersonal relationships (guanxi).

Since the mid-2000s, export-oriented industrialization has faced significant challenges and undergone substantial restructuring in response to changes in the business environment. In 2005, the Guangdong provincial government introduced a "dual-track transformation" policy to promote industrial upgrading by relocating low-end and highly polluting manufacturing activities outside the PRD and replacing them with higher-value-added industries. This approach was known as the "empty the cage for new birds" (tenglonghuanniao) strategy. Subsequent studies have examined the transformation of export-oriented industrialization in the PRD and changes in the organization of cross-border production networks involving overseas Chinese investment.

== Free trade zones ==
A special economic zone (SEZ) is an area in which the business and trade laws are different from the rest of the country. SEZs are located within a country's national borders, and their aims include increasing trade balance, employment, increased investment, job creation and effective administration. To encourage businesses to set up in the zone, financial policies are introduced. These policies typically encompass investing, taxation, trading, quotas, customs and labour regulations. Additionally, companies may be offered tax holidays, where upon establishing themselves in a zone, they are granted a period of lower taxation.

The creation of special economic zones by the host country may be motivated by the desire to attract foreign direct investment (FDI). The benefits a company gains by being in a special economic zone may mean that it can produce and trade goods at a lower price, aimed at being globally competitive. In some countries, the zones have been criticized for being little more than labor camps, with workers denied fundamental labor rights. In some areas, especially Southeast Asia, some SEZs have been repurposed to house illicit activities, including illegal online gambling and cyber-enabled fraud (see for example Golden Triangle Special Economic Zone).

== Criticism and counter arguments ==
=== Theoretical ===
Mainstream economic analysis points out that EOI presupposes that a government contains the relevant market-knowledge enabling it to judge whether or not an industry to be given development subsidies will prove a good investment in the future. The ability of a government to do this, it is argued, is probably limited as it will not have occurred through the natural interaction of the market forces of supply and demand. Additionally, they claim that the exploitation of a potential comparative advantage requires a significant amount of investment, of which governments can only supply a limited amount. In many LDCs, it is necessary for multinational corporations to provide the foreign direct investment, knowledge, skills and training needed to develop an industry and exploit the future comparative advantage.

Scholars have claimed that governments in East Asia, nonetheless, did have the ability and the resources to identify and exploit comparative advantages. EOI has, therefore, been supported as a development strategy for poor countries - because of its success in the Four Asian Tigers. It has helped these countries to escape the middle income trap to become developed, industrialized countries.

This claim has been challenged by a minority of non-mainstream economists, who have instead emphasised the very specific historical, political, and legislative conditions in East Asia that were not present elsewhere, and which allowed for the success of EOI in these nations. Japanese producers, for example, were given preferential access to US and European markets after World War II. Additionally, some domestic production was explicitly protected from outside competition, for an extensive period of time and until local business entities had become strong enough to compete internationally. They claim that the protectionist policies are crucial to the success of EOI. Digital B2B platforms have also provided Chinese exporters with additional channels for reaching overseas markets. A study of Chinese firms using Alibaba.com found that platform use was positively associated with contact with foreign buyers and export sales performance.

=== Empirical ===
Despite its support in mainstream economic circles, EOI's ostensible success has been increasingly challenged over recent years due to a growing number of examples in which it has not yielded the expected results. EOI increases market sensitivity to exogenous factors, and is partially responsible for the damage done by the 1997 Asian financial crisis to the economies of countries who used export-oriented industrialization. This is something which occurred during the 2008 financial crisis and subsequent global recession. Similarly, localized disasters can cause worldwide shortages of the products that countries specialize in. For example, in 2010, flooding in Thailand led to a shortage of hard drives.

Other criticisms include that export oriented industrialization has limited success if the economy is experiencing a decline in its terms of trade, where prices for its exports are rising at a slower rate than that of its imports. This is true of many economies aiming to exploit their comparative advantage in primary commodities as they have a long-term trend of declining prices, noted in the Singer-Prebisch thesis though there are criticisms of this thesis as practical contradictions have occurred. Primary-commodity dependency also links to the weakness of excessive specialization as primary commodities have incredible price volatility, given the inelastic nature of their demand, leading to a disproportionately large change in price given a change in demand for them.

== See also ==
- Import substitution industrialization
- International trade
- Industrial policy
- The Commanding Heights
