= Cläre Tisch =

German economist

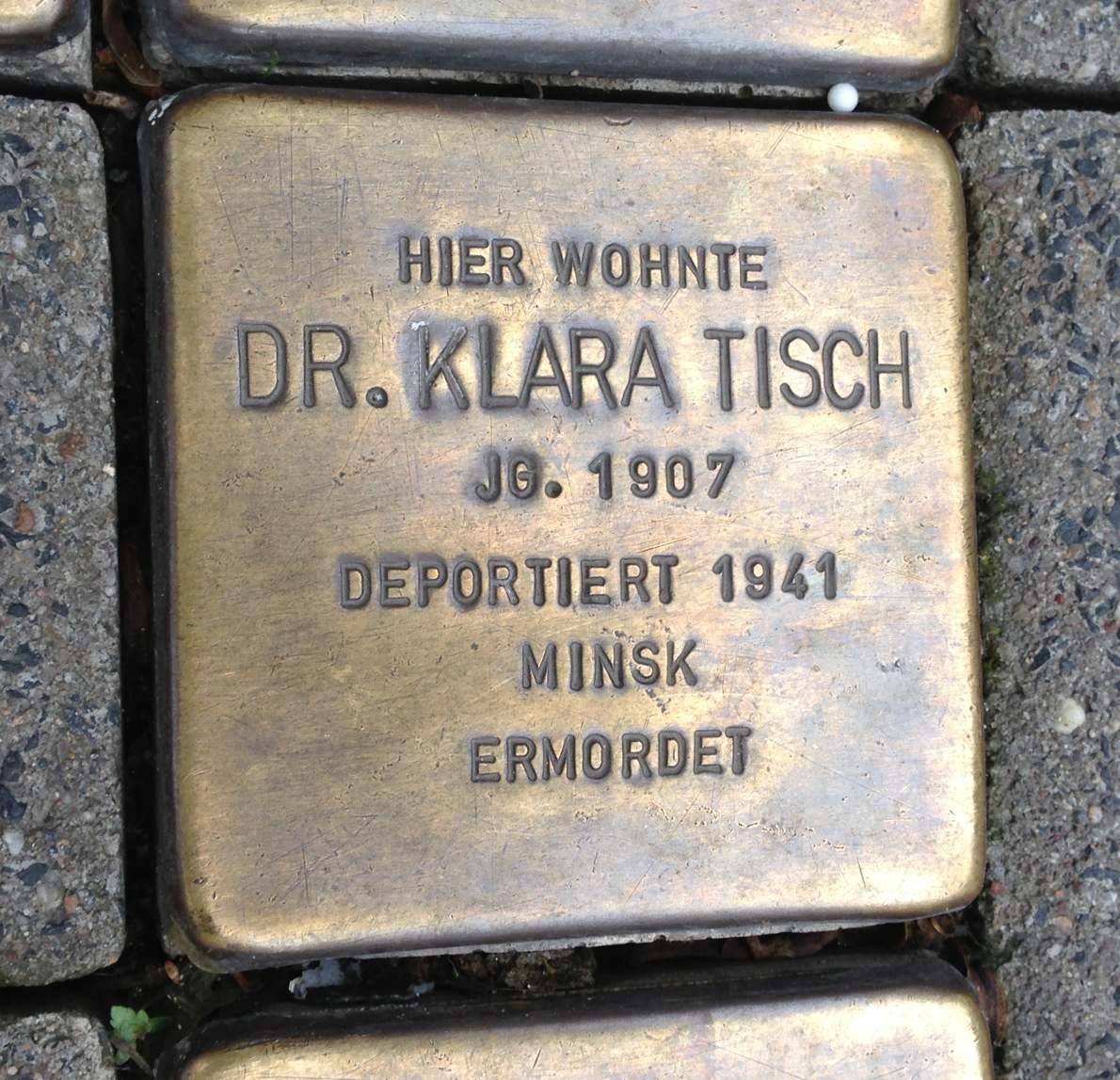
Stolperstein for Cläre Tisch in Wuppertal's Neumarktstraße

Cläre Tisch, also "Kläre Tisch" or "Klara Tisch," (14 January 1907 in Elberfeld – 1942 or 1943 in Minsk, Generalbezirk Weißruthenien) was a German economist.

== Life ==
Cläre Tisch was the daughter of the Elberfeld wholesale merchant Leo Tisch and his wife Adele who emigrated to Germany in 1895 from Tarnow in Poland. She first went to school at Lyzeum West in Elberfeld, later to the Realgymnasiale Studienanstalt in Unterbarmen. Beginning in 1926, she studied economics in Bonn, Geneva, Berlin and finally again in Bonn. In Bonn, her teachers were Arthur Spiethoff, Herbert von Beckerath and Joseph Schumpeter, under whose guidance she received her Ph.D. with a thesis on the Socialist calculation debate, which received much attention in the academic community. Schumpeter supported her later when he was professor in Harvard and exchanged letters with her until her deportation.

Tisch's thesis, finished in 1932, was entitled "Economic Calculation and Distribution in the Centrally Organized Socialist Commonwealth" (German: Wirtschaftsrechnung und Verteilung im zentralistisch organisierten sozialistischen Gemeinwesen). The 24-year-old's argument was considered "influential" (McCraw) and a "remarkable achievement" (Hagemann), and made her a forerunner of neoclassical socialism in the likes Henry D. Dickinson, Oskar Lange and Abba Lerner. Friedrich August Hayek would cite her work as well as Schumpeter in his book Capitalism, Socialism and Democracy. Up to 1933 Tisch worked as a scientist; in addition she was assistant to Arthur Spiethoff.

Due to Nazi anti-Jewish policies, she was forced to leave the university; she took on various jobs in the private sector.

In 1936, she became the principal of the adoption organization for the Jewish Women Organization in Wuppertal-Elberfeld. She turned down various opportunities to leave Germany, probably because of her desire to help the children. Schumpeter had provided an affidavit for her in order to facilitate her emigration to the United States.

On 10 November 1941, Tisch was deported together with her sisters Marie and Gerda, her brother-in-law Leo Marcus, and her niece Arnhild Marcus in a group of 992 Jewish co-citizens from Wuppertal, Düsseldorf, and Essen to the Minsk Ghetto, where she was murdered very likely in 1942 or 1943.

In front of the house in Wuppertal's Neumarktstraße 46, where she used to live, a so-called "stumbling block" is a memorial to her. She is also featured in the permanent exhibition of the Old Synagogue Center in Wuppertal.

== Works ==
- Wirtschaftsrechnung und Verteilung im zentralistisch organisierten sozialistischen Gemeinwesen, (Bonner Dissertation), Wuppertal-Elberfeld 1932
- Der wirtschaftliche Sinn der bisherigen Rechtsprechung des deutschen Kartellgerichts. Vittorio Klostermann, Frankfurt a.M. 1934
- Organisationsformen der Deutschen Mittelindustrie (Industriewirtschaftliche Untersuchungen) - hrsg. v. Herbert von Beckerath; Heft 3, Vittorio Klostermann, Frankfurt/Main 1934

== Literature ==
- Harald Hagemann, article „Cläre Tisch“, in: Biographisches Handbuch der deutschsprachigen wirtschaftswissenschaftlichen Emigration nach 1933, hg. von Harald Hagemann und Claus-Dieter Krohn, K. G. Saur München 1999, ISBN 3-598-11284-X, Band 2, S. 714ff.
- H. Hagemann, article „Cläre Tisch“, in: Robert W. Dimand, Mary Ann Dimand, Evelyn L. Forget (Hg.), A Biographical Dictionary Of Women Economists, Cheltenham 2000, S. 426-429.
