= Import substitution industrialization =

Trade and economic policy

Import substitution industrialization (ISI) is a protectionist trade and economic policy that advocates replacing foreign imports with domestic production. It is based on the premise that a country should attempt to reduce its foreign dependency through the local production of industrialized products. The term primarily refers to 20th-century development economics policies, but it has been advocated since the 18th century by economists such as Friedrich List and Alexander Hamilton.

ISI policies have been enacted by developing countries with the intention of producing development and self-sufficiency by the creation of an internal market. The state leads economic development by nationalization, subsidization of manufacturing, increased taxation, and highly protectionist trade policies. In the context of Latin American development, the term "Latin American structuralism" refers to the era of import substitution industrialization in many Latin American countries from the 1950s to the 1980s. The theories behind Latin American structuralism and ISI were organized in the works of economists such as Raúl Prebisch, Hans Singer, and Celso Furtado, and gained prominence with the creation of the United Nations Economic Commission for Latin America and the Caribbean (UNECLAC or CEPAL). They were influenced by a wide range of Keynesian, communitarian, and socialist economic thought, as well as dependency theory.

By the mid-1960s, many of the economists who had previously advocated for ISI in developing countries grew disenchanted with the policy and its outcomes. Many of the countries that adopted ISI policies in the post-WWII years had abandoned ISI by the late 1980s, reducing government intervention in the economy and becoming active participants in the World Trade Organization. In contrast to ISI policies, the Four Asian Tigers (Hong Kong, Singapore, South Korea and Taiwan) have been characterized as government intervention to facilitate "export-oriented industrialization".

ISI policies generally had large distributional consequences, as the incomes of export-oriented sectors (such as agriculture) declined while the incomes of import-competing sectors (such as manufacturing) increased. Governments that adopted ISI policies ran persistent budget deficits as state-owned enterprises never became profitable. They also ran current accounts deficits, as the manufactured goods produced by ISI countries were not competitive in international markets, and as the agricultural sector (the sector which was competitive in international markets) was weakened; as a result, ISI countries ended up importing more. ISI policies were also plagued by rent-seeking.

== History ==
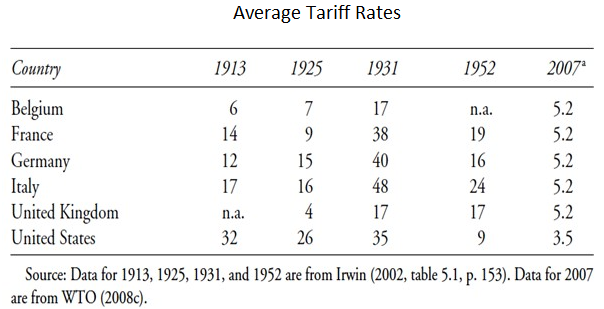
Average tariff rates for selected countries (1913–2007)

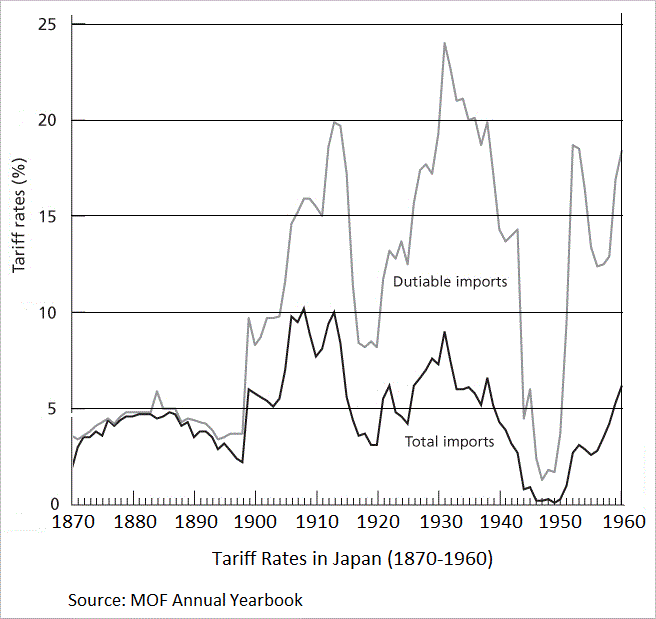
Tariff rates in Japan (1870–1960)

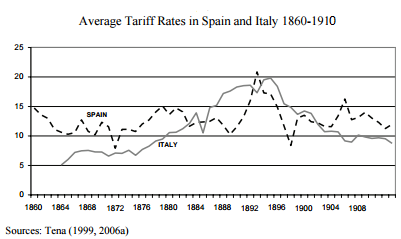
Average tariff rates in Spain and Italy (1860–1910)

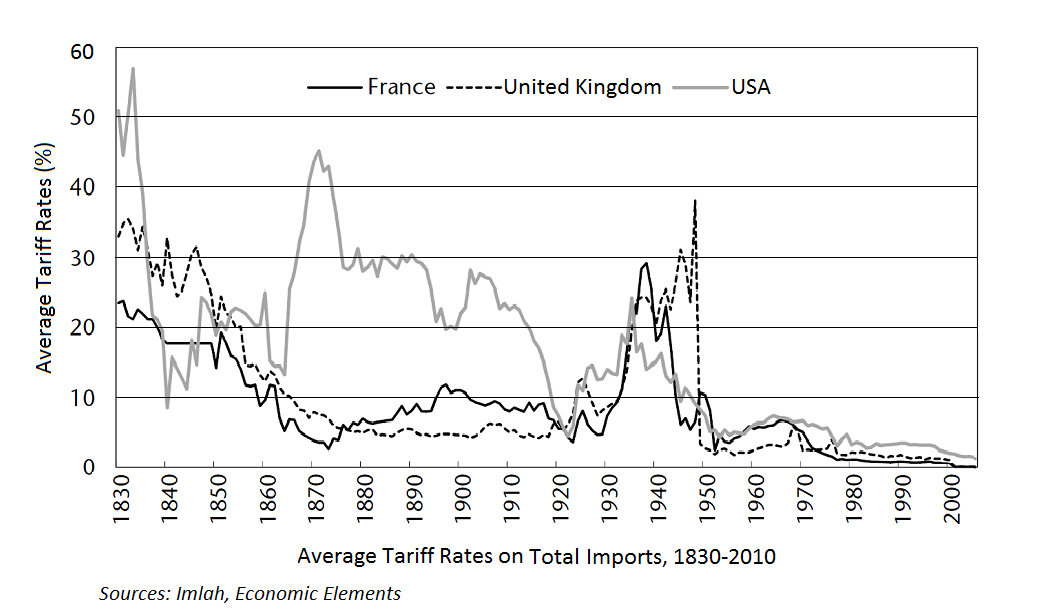
Average tariff rates (France, UK, US)

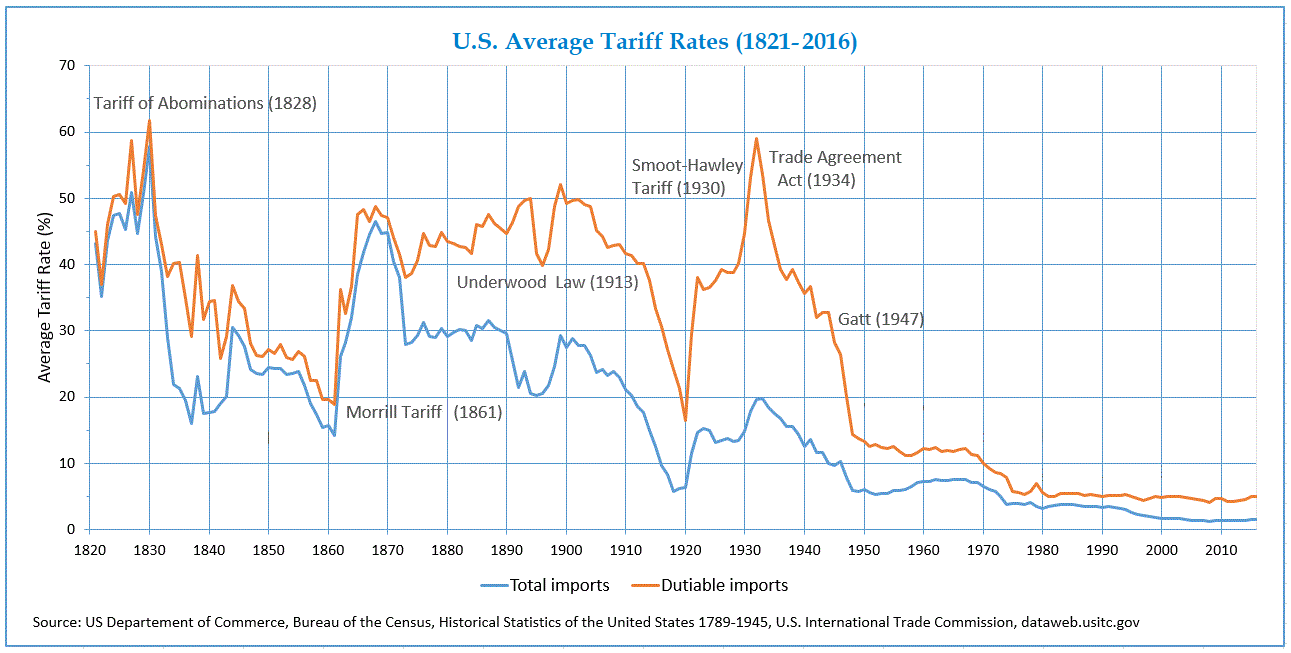
Average tariff rates in US (1821–2016)

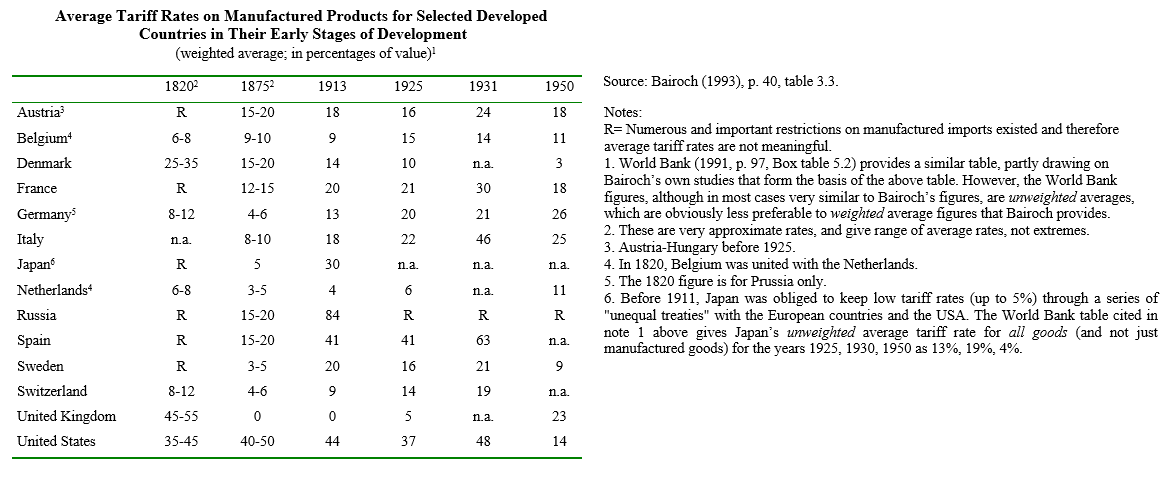
Average tariff rates on manufactured products

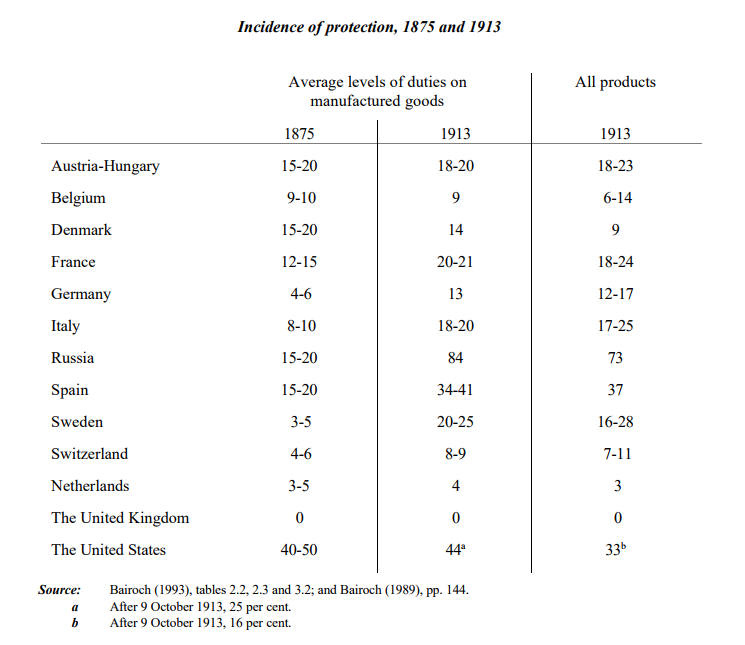
Average levels of duties (1875 and 1913)

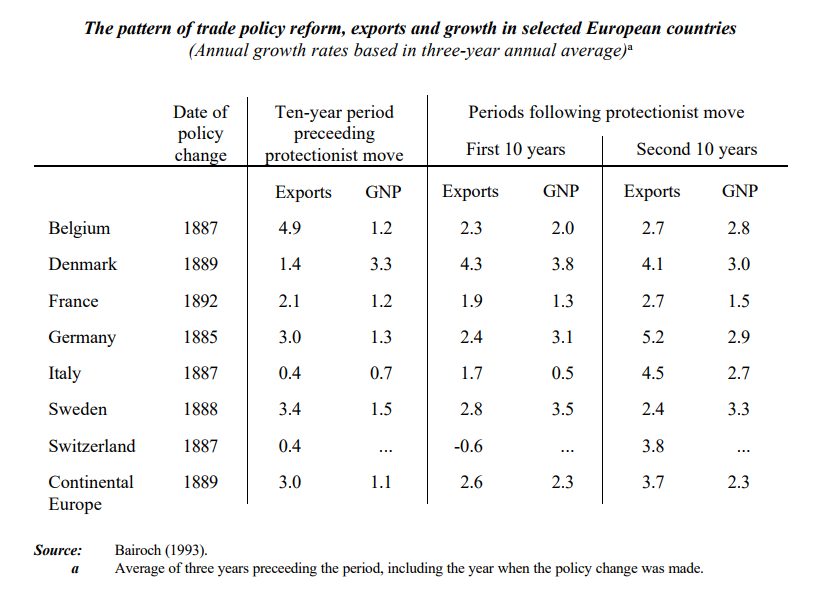
Trade policy, exports and growth in European countries

ISI is a development theory, but its political implementation and theoretical rationale are rooted in trade theory. It has been argued that all or virtually all nations that have industrialized have followed ISI. Import substitution was heavily practiced during the mid-20th century as a form of developmental theory that advocated increased productivity and economic gains within a country. It was an inward-looking economic theory practiced by developing nations after World War II. Many economists then considered the ISI approach as a remedy to mass poverty by bringing a developing country to a developed status through national industrialization. Mass poverty is defined as "the dominance of agricultural and mineral activities – in the low-income countries, and in their inability, because of their structure, to profit from international trade."

Mercantilist economic theory and practices of the 16th, 17th, and 18th centuries frequently advocated building up domestic manufacturing and import substitution. In the early United States, the Hamiltonian economic program, specifically the third report and the magnum opus of Alexander Hamilton, the Report on Manufactures, advocated for the U.S. to become self-sufficient in manufactured goods. That formed the basis of the American School in economics, which was an influential force in the country during its 19th-century industrialization.

Werner Baer contends that all countries that have industrialized after the United Kingdom have gone through a stage of ISI in which much investment in industry was directed to replace imports. Going further, in his book Kicking Away the Ladder, the South Korean economist Ha-Joon Chang also argues based on economic history that all major developed countries, including the United Kingdom, used interventionist economic policies to promote industrialization and protected national companies until they had reached a level of development in which they were able to compete in the global market. Those countries adopted free market discourses directed at other countries to obtain two objectives: to open their markets to local products and to prevent them from adopting the same development strategies that had led to the industrialization of the developed countries.

== Theoretical basis ==
As a set of development policies, ISI policies are theoretically grounded on the Prebisch–Singer thesis, on the infant industry argument, and on Keynesian economics. The associated practices are commonly:

- an active industrial policy to subsidize and orchestrate production of strategic substitutes
- protective barriers to trade (such as tariffs)
- an overvalued currency to help manufacturers import capital goods (heavy machinery)
- discouragement of foreign direct investment

By placing high tariffs on imports and other protectionist, inward-looking trade policies, the citizens of any given country by using a simple supply-and-demand rationale substitute the less expensive good for a more expensive one. The primary industry of importance would gather its resources, such as labor from other industries in this situation. The industrial sector would use resources, capital, and labor from the agricultural sector. In time, a developing country would look and behave similar to a developed country, and with a new accumulation of capital and an increase of total factor productivity, the nation's industry would in principle be capable of trading internationally and of competing in the world market. Bishwanath Goldar, in his paper Import Substitution, Industrial Concentration and Productivity Growth in Indian Manufacturing, wrote: "Earlier studies on productivity for the industrial sector of developing countries have indicated that increases in total factor productivity, (TFP) are an important source of industrial growth". He continued that "a higher growth rate in output, other things remaining the same, would enable the industry to attain a higher rate of technological progress (since more investment would be made) and create a situation in which the constituent firms could take greater advantage of scale economies." It is believed that ISI will allow that.

In many cases, however, the assertions did not apply. On several occasions, the Brazilian ISI process, which occurred from 1930 to the late 1980s, involved currency devaluations to boost exports and discouraging imports, thus promoting the consumption of locally manufactured products, and the adoption of different exchange rates for importing capital goods and for importing consumer goods. Moreover, government policies toward investment were not always opposed to foreign capital: the Brazilian industrialization process was based on a tripod that involved governmental, private, and foreign capital, the first being directed to infrastructure and heavy industry, the second to manufacturing consumer goods, and the third to the production of durable goods such as automobiles. Volkswagen, Ford, GM, and Mercedes all established production facilities in Brazil in the 1950s and the 1960s.

The underlying goal of ISI is to reduce economic dependency on other countries by using national or foreign investment to increase local production of industrial goods and services, which can be consumed domestically or exported. Substituting imports is distinct from eliminating imports. As a country industrializes, it typically imports new materials that developing industries need, often including petroleum, chemicals, and raw materials.

=== Local ownership import substituting ===
In 2006, Michael Shuman proposed local ownership import substituting (LOIS), as an alternative to neoliberalism. It rejects the view that there is no alternative. Shuman claims that LOIS businesses are long-term wealth generators, are less likely to exit destructively, and have higher economic multipliers.

== Latin America ==
Import substitution policies were adopted by most nations in Latin America from the 1930s to the late 1980s. The initial date is largely attributed to the impact of the Great Depression of the 1930s, when Latin American countries, which exported primary products and imported almost all of the industrialized goods that they consumed, were prevented from importing because of a sharp decline in their foreign sales, which served as an incentive for the domestic production of the goods that they needed. The end date being the 1980s is largely due the emerging debt crisis that was occurring at the time, and through solving the crisis they turned away from import substitution and toward neoliberalism.

The first steps in import substitution were less theoretical and more pragmatic choices on how to face the limitations imposed by recession even though the governments in Argentina (Juan Domingo Perón) and Brazil (Getúlio Vargas) had the precedent of Fascist Italy (and, to some extent, the Soviet Union) as inspirations of state-induced industrialization. Positivist thinking, which sought a strong government to modernize society, played a major influence on Latin American military thinking in the 20th century. The officials, many of whom rose to power, like Perón and Vargas, considered industrialization (especially steel production) to be synonymous with "progress" and naturally placed as a priority.

ISI gained a theoretical foundation only in the 1950s, when the Argentine economist and UNECLAC leader Raúl Prebisch was a visible proponent of the idea, as well as the Brazilian economist Celso Furtado.

Prebisch had experience running his country's central bank and started to question the model of export-led growth. Prebisch came to the conclusion that the participants in the free-trade regime had unequal power and that the central economies (particularly, Britain and the United States) that manufactured industrial goods could control the price of their exports. The unequal powers were taking the wealth from developing countries, leaving them with no way to prosper. He believed that developing countries needed to create local vertical linkages and that they could not succeed except by creating industries that used the primary products already being produced domestically. Tariffs were designed to allow domestic infant industries to prosper. In doing so, Prebisch predicted many benefits: dependence on imports would lower, and the country would not be forced to sell agricultural goods for low prices to pay for industrial goods, the income rate would go up, and the country itself would have a strong growth.

Within Latin America, ISI was most successful in more populous, higher-income countries where domestic demand could better absorb new production. These conditions obtained in Argentina, Brazil, and Mexico and, to a lesser extent, in Chile, Uruguay and Venezuela.

While the investment to produce cheap consumer products may be profitable in small markets, the same cannot be said for capital-intensive industries, such as automobiles and heavy machinery, which depend on larger markets to survive. Thus, smaller and poorer countries, such as Ecuador, Honduras, and the Dominican Republic, could implement ISI only to a limited extent. Peru implemented ISI in 1961, and the policy lasted until the end of the decade in some form.

To overcome the difficulties of implementing ISI in small-scale economies, proponents of the economic policy, some within UNECLAC, suggested two alternatives to enlarge consumer markets: income redistribution within each country by agrarian reform and other initiatives aimed at bringing Latin America's enormous marginalized population into the consumer market and regional integration by initiatives such as the Latin American Free Trade Association (ALALC), which would allow for the products of one country to be sold in another.

In Latin American countries in which ISI was most successful, it was accompanied by structural changes to the government. Old neocolonial governments were replaced by more-or-less democratic governments. Banks, utilities, and certain other foreign-owned companies were nationalized or had their ownership transferred to locals.

Many economists contend that ISI failed in Latin America and was one of many factors leading to the so-called lost decade of Latin American economics.

Against most opinions, one historian argued that ISI was successful in fostering a great deal of social and economic development in Latin America:

"By the early 1960s, domestic industry supplied 95% of Mexico's and 98% of Brazil's consumer goods. Between 1950 and 1980, Latin America's industrial output went up six times, keeping well ahead of population growth. Infant mortality fell from 107 per 1,000 live births in 1960 to 69 per 1,000 in 1980, [and] life expectancy rose from 52 to 64 years. In the mid-1950s, Latin America's economies were growing faster than those of the industrialized West."

== Africa ==
ISI policies were implemented in various forms across Africa from the early 1960s to the mid-1970s to promote indigenous economic growth within newly independent states. The national impetus for ISI can be seen from 1927, with the creation of the East African and Central African common markets in British and French colonies that recognized the importance of common trading tariffs in specific parts of the continent and aimed to protect domestic manufacturing from external competitors.

=== Colonial economies ===
Early attempts at ISI were stifled by colonial neomercantilist policies of the 1940s and the 1950s that aimed to generate growth by exporting primary products to the detriment of imports. The promotion of exports to metropoles was the primary goal of the colonial economic system. The metropolitan governments aimed to offset colonial expenditures and attain primary commercial products from Africa at a significantly reduced rate. That was successful for British commercial interests in Ghana and Nigeria, which increased 20 times the value of foreign trade between 1897 and 1960 because of the promotion of export crops such as cocoa and palm oil. Such economic growth occurred at the expense of indigenous communities, which had no say over the crops that were produced and retained marginal profits from their agricultural output. That model also expanded monocultures, whose economies were centered on a single crop or natural resource for exports. Monoculturing was prevalent in countries such as Senegal and Gambia, where groundnuts accounted for 85% to 90% of earnings throughout the 1940s. That economic model rendered the postcolonial states vulnerable to unstable export prices and failed to promote the diversification of the economy. Postcolonial governments were also sceptical of the reliance on multinational corporations for economic development, as they were less likely to pay taxes and exported capital abroad. Thus, ISI policies were adopted to redirect African economies towards indigenous growth and industrialisation.

=== Post-colonial economic situation ===
The underdeveloped political and economic structures inherited across post-colonial Africa created a domestic impetus for ISI. Marxist historians such as Walter Rodney contend that the gross underdevelopment in social services were a direct result of colonial economic strategy, which had to be abandoned to generate sustainable development. Rene Dumont supported that observation and argued that African states were administratively overburdened as a result of colonialism. The initial, unchanged conditions created discontent in states such as Ghana and Tanzania during the early 1960s over the fall in wages and employment opportunities. The unrest culminated in a series of mass strikes and tensions between governments and trade unions. Dissatisfaction with the poor economic progress upon decolonisation made it clear to African leaders that they could no longer rely on rhetoric and tradition to maintain power and could retain the support of their political base only through a coherent economic model aligned with their political interests. The culmination of the political and economic issues necessitated the adoption of ISI, as it rejected the colonial neo-mercantilist policies that they believed had led to underdevelopment.

=== Ideological foundation ===
For leaders of post-colonial African nations, it was imperative for their economic policies to represent an ideological break with the imperialist models of development. To achieve that, some newly independent states pursued African socialism to build indigenous growth and break free from capitalist development patterns. Through the adoption of African socialism, leaders such as Kwame Nkrumah, Julius Nyerere, and Leopold Senghor hoped to establish a model of development based around consciencism, an intellectual and cultural revolution; and, most importantly, a big push in industrialization towards rapid development for the continent. One of the main aspects of the big push towards development was the growth of parastatals from 1960 to 1980. The state-owned trading corporations were given control over the import-export business as well as the retail-wholesale distribution. That allowed post-colonial states to nationalise industries and retain the profits from their output, rather than allow capital flight to the west through multinational corporations.

The growth of African socialism in the pursuit of ISI can be seen in the 1967 Arusha Declaration (Tanzania) in which Nyerere argued that "we cannot get enough money and borrow enough technicians to start all the industries we need and even if we could get the necessary assistance, dependence on it would interfere with our policy on socialism." The need for indigenous development formed the core of the African socialist vision whereby the state would manage a planned economy to prevent it from being controlled by the free market, which was regarded as a form of neo-imperialism. In line with that economic vision, Tanzania engaged in the nationalization of industry to create jobs and to produce a domestic market for goods while it maintained an adherence to African socialist principles exemplified through the ujamaa program of villagization. The unaffordability of industrial products and increased tensions between managers and settlers of the villages contributed to a "colossal failure" of ISI in Tanzania, leading it to abandon the villagization project and to focus on agricultural development.

While ISI under African socialism was purported to be an anti-Western development model, scholars such as Anthony Smith argued that its ideological roots came from Rostow's modernization theory, which maintains that commitment to economic growth and free-market capitalism is the most efficient means of state development. Kenya's implementation of ISI under state capitalism exemplifies the model of development. Tom Mboya, the first minister for economic development and planning, aimed to create a growth-oriented path of industrialization, even at the expense of traditional socialist morals. Kenya's Sessional Paper No. 10 of 1965 reinforced the view by claiming, "If Africanization is undertaken at the expense of growth, our reward will be a falling standard of living." Under such a development path, multinational corporations occupied a dominant role in the economy, primarily in the manufacturing sectors. Economic historians such as Ralph Austen argue that the openness to western enterprise and technical expertise led to a higher GNP in Kenya than comparative socialist countries such as Ghana and Tanzania. However, the 1972 World Bank ILO report on Kenya claimed that direct state intervention was necessary to reduce the growing economic inequalities that had occurred as a result of state capitalism.

=== Implementation ===
In all of the countries that adopted ISI, the state oversaw and managed its implementation, designing economic policies that directed development towards the indigenous population, with the aim of creating an industrialised economy. The 1972 Nigerian Enterprises Promotion Decree exemplified such control, as it required foreign companies to offer at least 40% of their equity shares to local people. A state-controlled economy has been criticized by scholars such as Douglas North who claim that the interests of political elites may be self-serving, rather than for the good of the nation. That correlates with the theory of neo-patrimonialism, which claims that post-colonial elites used the coercive powers of the state to maintain their political positions and to increase their personal wealth. Ola Olson opposes that view by arguing that in a developing economy, the government is the only actor with the financial and political means to unify the state apparatus behind an industrialization process.

=== Outcomes ===
Sub-Saharan Africa's experiment with ISI created largely pessimistic results across the continent by the early 1980s. Manufacturing, which formed the core of the big push towards industrialisation, accounted for only 7% of GDP across the continent by 1983. The failures of the model stemmed from various external and domestic factors. Internally, efforts to industrialise came at the expense of the agricultural sector, which accounted for 70% of the region's workforce throughout the 1970s. The neglect was detrimental to producers as well as the urban population, as agricultural output could not meet the increasing demands for foodstuffs and raw materials in the growing urban areas. ISI efforts also suffered from a comparative disadvantage in skilled labor for industrial growth.

A 1982 World Bank report stated, "There exists a chronic shortage of skills which pervades not only the small manufacturing sector but the entire economy and the over-loaded government machine." Tanzania, for example, had only two engineers at the beginning of the import-substitution period. The skills shortage was exacerbated by the technological deficiencies facing African states throughout industrialisation. Learning and adopting the technological resources and skills was a protracted and costly process, something that African states were unable to capitalise on because of the lack of domestic savings and poor literacy rates across the continent.

The failure of ISI to generate sufficient growth in industrialisation and overall development led to its abandonment by the early 1980s. In response to the underdeveloped economies in the region, the IMF and the World Bank imposed a neo-classical counter-revolution in Africa through Structural Adjustment Programmes (SAPs) from 1981.

The new economic consensus blamed the low growth rates on excessive protectionism in the industrial sector, the neglect of exports, and the low agricultural productivity. For the IMF and the World Bank, the solution to the failure of import substitution was a restructuring of the economy towards strict adherence to a neoliberal model of development throughout the 1980s and the 1990s.

== Russia ==
In 2014, customs duties were applied on imported products in the food sector. Russia has considerably reduced its food imports, and domestic production has increased considerably. The cost of food imports dropped from $60 billion in 2014 to $20 billion in 2017, and the country enjoys record cereal production. Russia has strengthened its position on the world food market and has become food self-sufficient. In the fisheries, fruit, and vegetables sectors, domestic production has increased sharply, imports have declined significantly, and the trade balance (the difference between exports and imports) has improved. In the second quarter of 2017, agricultural exports were expected to exceed imports, which would make Russia a net agricultural exporter for the first time in almost 100 years.

== Criticism ==
Import substitution policies might create jobs in the short run, but as domestic producers replace foreign producers, both output and growth are lower than would otherwise have been in the long run. Import substitution denies the country the benefits to be gained from specialisation and foreign imports. The theory of comparative advantage shows how countries within the model gain from trade, however, this concept has received criticism for its misguided underlying assumptions and inapplicability to modern production. Moreover, protectionism leads to dynamic inefficiency, as domestic producers have no incentive from foreign competitors to reduce costs or improve products. Import substitution can impede growth through poor allocation of resources, and its effect on exchange rates harms exports.

=== Results ===
Despite some apparent gains, import substitution was "both unsustainable over time and produced high economic and social costs". Given import substitution's dependence upon its developed and isolated markets within Latin America, it relied upon the growth of a market that was limited in size. In most cases, the lack of experience in manufacturing and the lack of competition reduced innovation and efficiency, which restrained the quality of Latin American produced goods, and protectionist policies kept prices high. In addition, power was concentrated in the hands of a few, which decreased the incentive for entrepreneurial development. Lastly, the large deficits and debts resulting from import substitution policies are largely credited for the Latin American crisis of the 1980s.

== See also ==
- The Commanding Heights for an exposition of the effects of ISI on Latin American economies
- International trade
- Export-oriented industrialization
- Autarky
- Domestic sourcing
- Local purchasing
- Mercantilism
- Prebisch–Singer thesis
- Protectionism
- Voluntary export restraints
- There is no alternative (TINA)
- Industrial policy
- Infant industry argument
- Licence Raj
- Resistance economy
