= Formação econômica do Brasil =

The Economic Growth of Brazi
- Author: Celso Furtado
- Language: Portuguese
- Published: 1959
- Publication place: Brazil

The Economic Growth of Brazil (Portuguese: Formação Econômica do Brasil) is a book by Brazilian economist Celso Furtado, published in 1959.

The book was written in a time of optimism in Brazil: it was the end of the government of Juscelino Kubitschek, considered one of the most democratic and its slogan "fifty years in five" will promote an outbreak of development, the example of the automobile industry that will eventually settle and initiatives for the promotion of growth, such as new roads and the creation of the Sudene (Superintendency for the Development of the Northeast).
