= Torborg =

Torborg is both a (rare) Swedish and Norwegian feminine given name and a surname. Notable people with the name include:

== Surname ==
- Dale Torborg (born 1971), American baseball trainer and professional wrestler, son of Jeff
- Herman H. Torborg (1869–1938), American lawyer and politician from New York
- Jeff Torborg (1941–2025), American baseball player and manager
- Wilhelm Neumann-Torborg (1856–1917), German sculptor

== Given name ==
- Torborg Nedreaas (1906–1987), Norwegian writer

== See also ==
- Thorborg, a Danish and Swedish surname
