= Heinz Thilo =

German SS officer (1911–1945)

Heinz Thilo (8 October 1911 in Elberfeld – 13 May 1945 in Hohenelbe) was a German SS officer and a physician in the Nazi concentration camp Auschwitz.

Thilo joined the Nazi party in December 1930 and the SS in 1934. From 1938 to 1941 he worked as a gynaecologist for the Lebensborn organization. After six months of war service he was assigned to the Auschwitz concentration camp in July 1942. There he became responsible for the infirmary camp with the rank of Obersturmführer. Thilo called the camp the "anus mundi" ("anus of the world"). He was one of the physicians commonly performing the "selections" in which incoming Jews were divided into those deemed able to work and those who were to be gassed immediately. Thilo also participated in the liquidation of the Theresienstadt family camp on July 10-11, 1944, when approximately 7000 Jews were murdered in the gas chambers.

In October 1944 Thilo was transferred to Gross-Rosen where he served as camp physician until February 1945. He fled shortly before the camp's liberation.

After the war, Thilo was arrested. He committed suicide in prison.
