= Elberfeld =

Municipality in Germany

Coordinates: 51°16′N 7°08′E

- Urban district
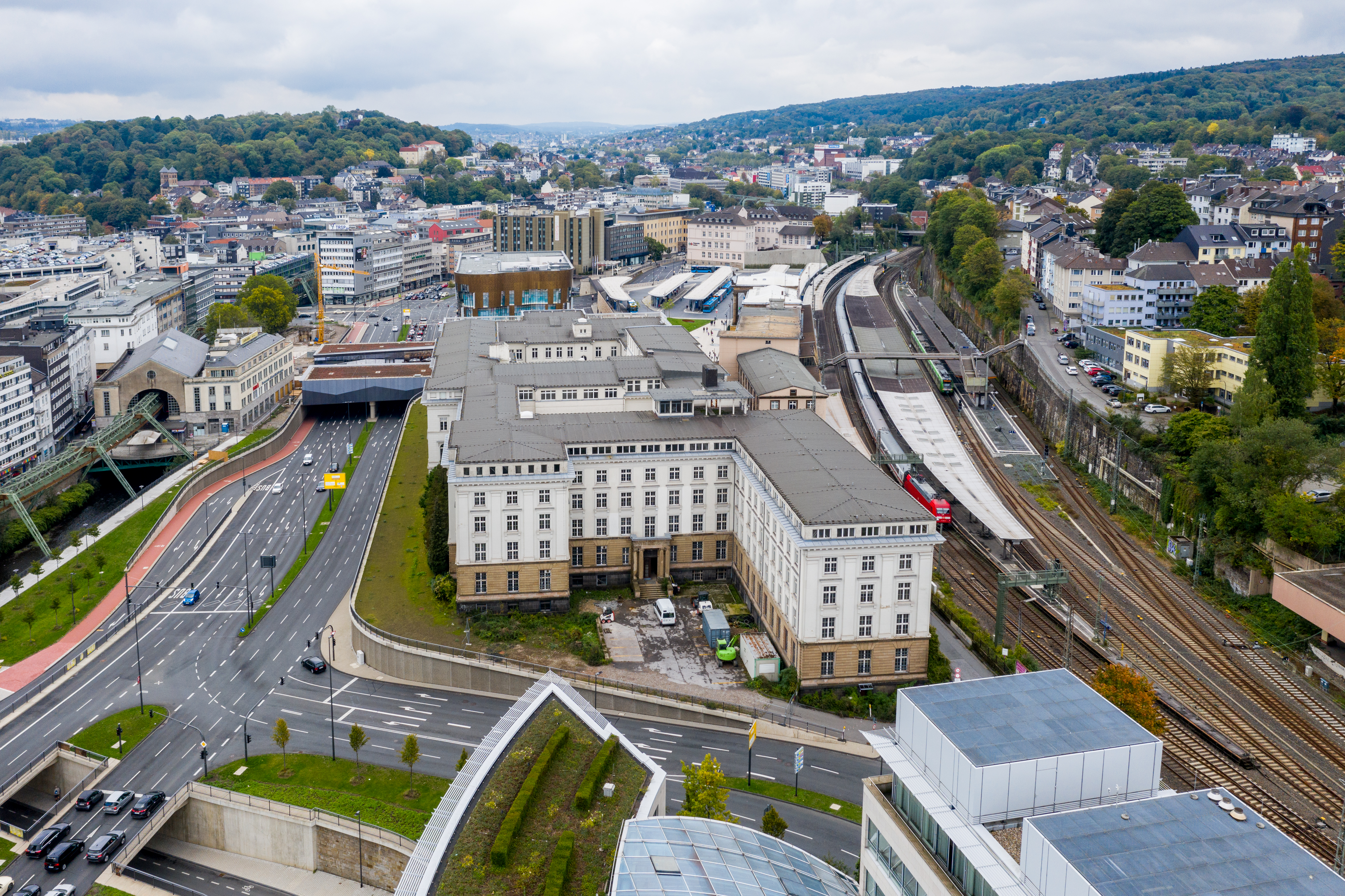
- View of Wuppertal Hauptbahnhof located in the Elberfeld district

- Coat of arms
- Etymology: Elverfelde
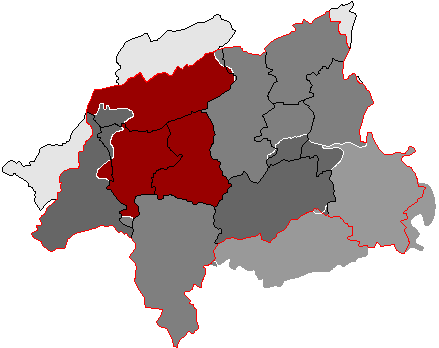
- Historic extent of Elberfeld within Wuppertal

Elberfeld (German pronunciation: [ˈɛlbɐfɛlt]) is a municipal subdivision of the German city of Wuppertal; it was an independent town until 1929.

== History ==
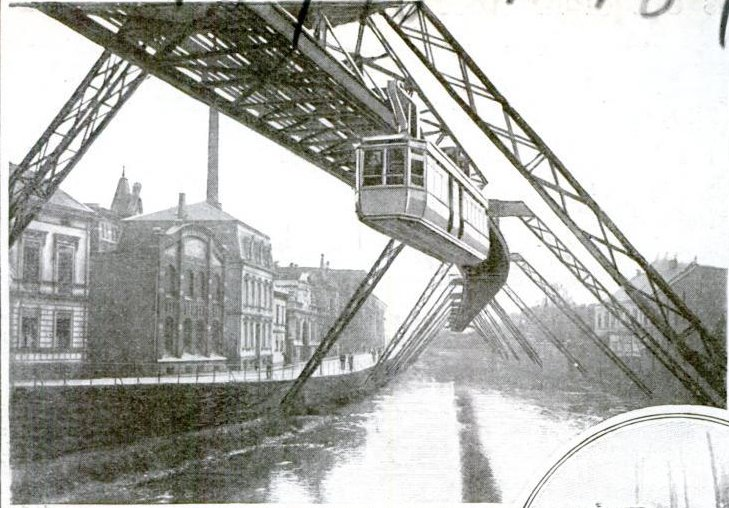
The suspension railway of Elberfeld was built over the river in order to keep the streets unobstructed.

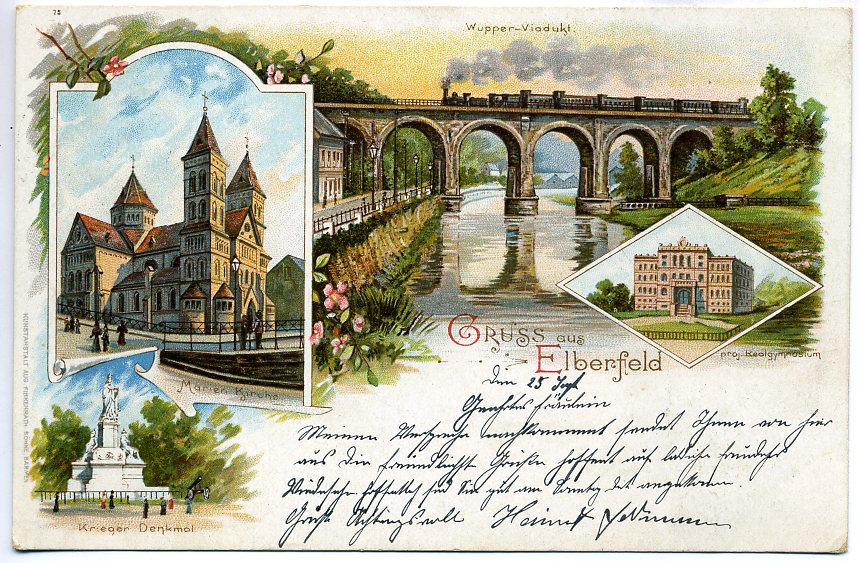
Elberfeld ca. 1899

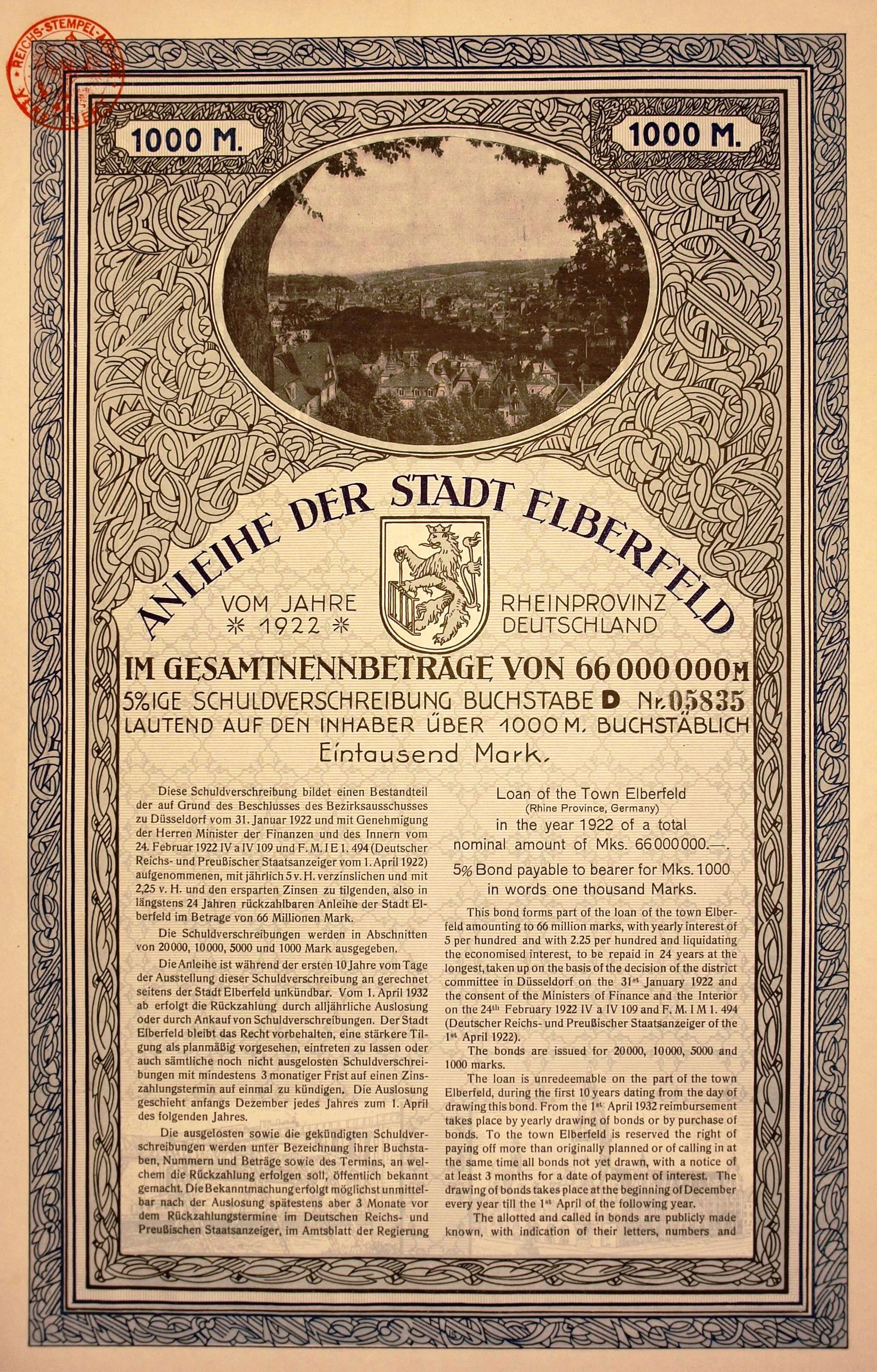
Bond of the former town Elberfeld, issued 1. March 1922

The first official mentioning of the geographic area on the banks of today's Wupper River as "elverfelde" was in a document of 1161. Etymologically, elver is derived from the old Low German word for "river." (See etymology of the name of the German Elbe River; cf. North Germanic älv.) Therefore, the original meaning of "elverfelde" can be understood as "field on the river." Elverfelde received its town charter in 1610.

In 1726, Elias Eller and a pastor, Daniel Schleyermacher, founded a Philadelphian Society. They later moved to Ronsdorf in the Duchy of Berg, becoming the Zionites, a fringe sect.

In 1826 Friedrich Harkort, a famous German industrialist and politician, had a type of suspension railway built as a trial and ran it on the grounds of what is today the tax office at Elberfeld. In fact the railway, the Schwebebahn Wuppertal, was eventually built between Oberbarmen and Vohwinkel and runs through Elberfeld.

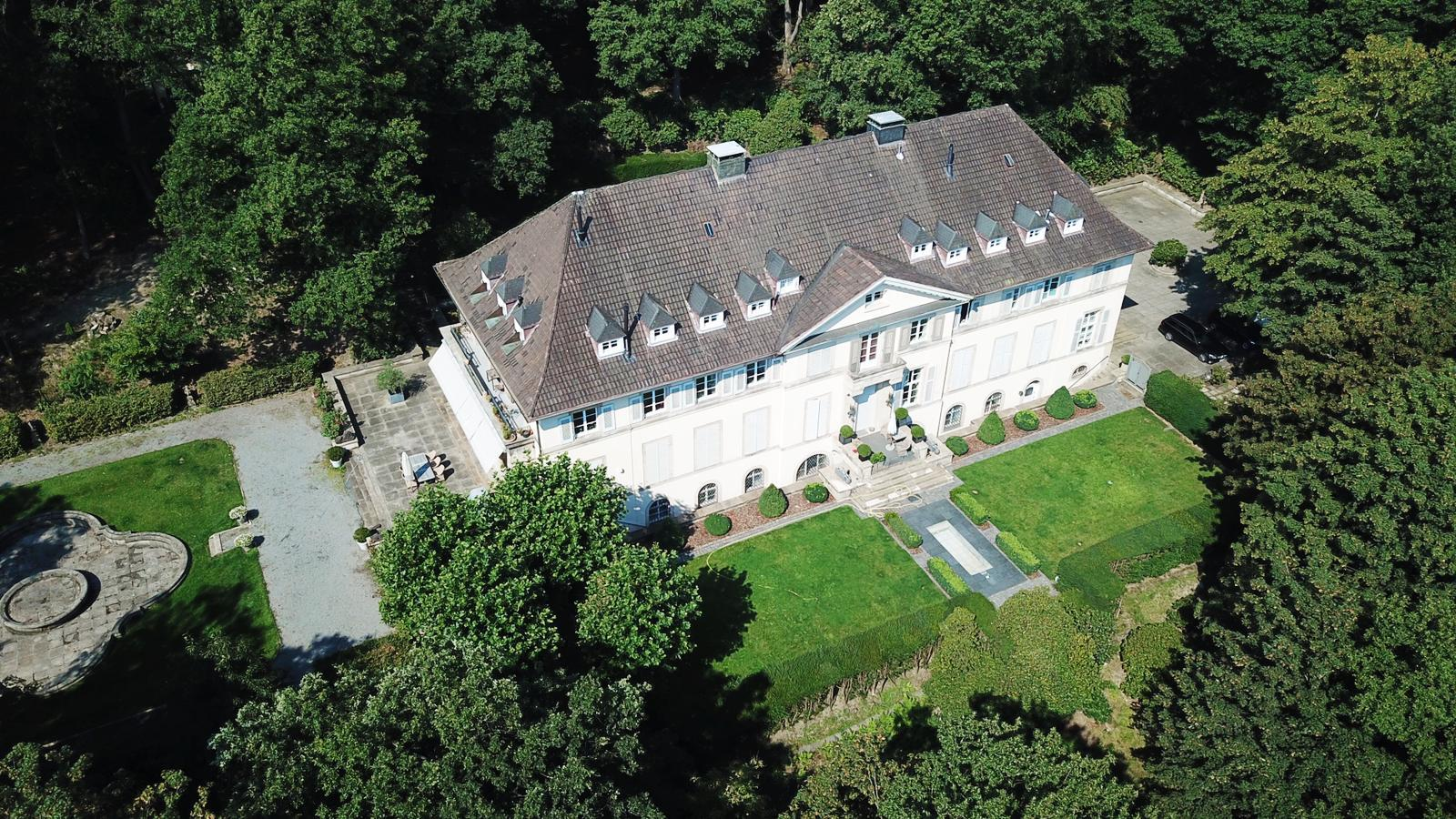
Haus Höhe, in Briller Viertel, Wuppertal

In 1888 the district of Sonnborn was incorporated into Elberfeld. In 1929 the towns of Barmen, Elberfeld, Vohwinkel, Cronenberg and Ronsdorf became a municipal entity officially called "Barmen-Elberfeld;" in the same year, the unified city administration through a vote of its council members decided to rename the newly incorporated city "Wuppertal." This took place in 1930. Today Elberfeld is the largest municipal subdivision of Wuppertal.

During World War II, forced laborers of the 3rd SS construction brigade were dispatched by the Nazis in Barmen-Elberfeld in 1943.

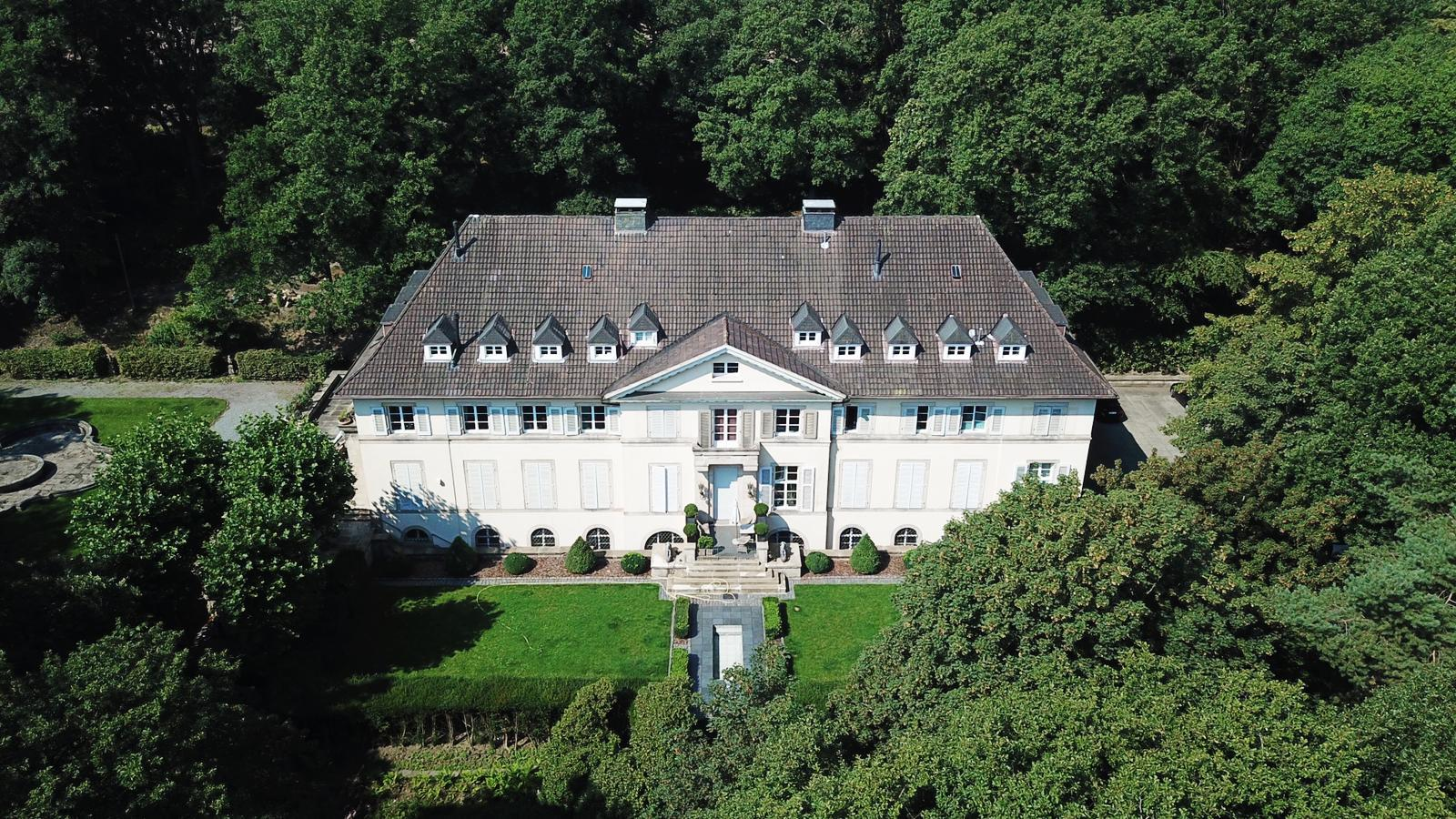
Haus Höhe, Briller Viertel, Wuppertal

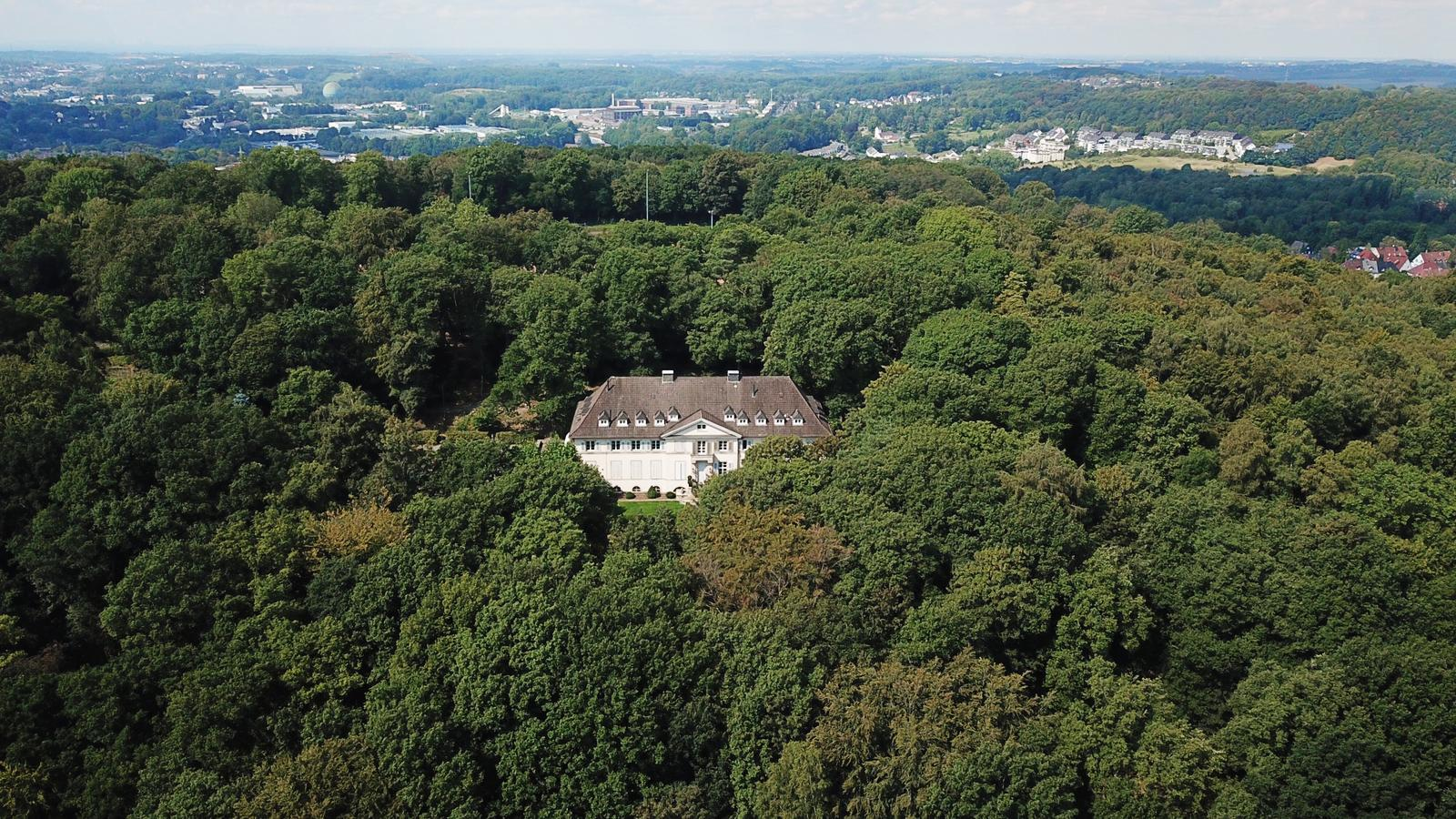
Haus Höhe, Briller Viertel, Wuppertal

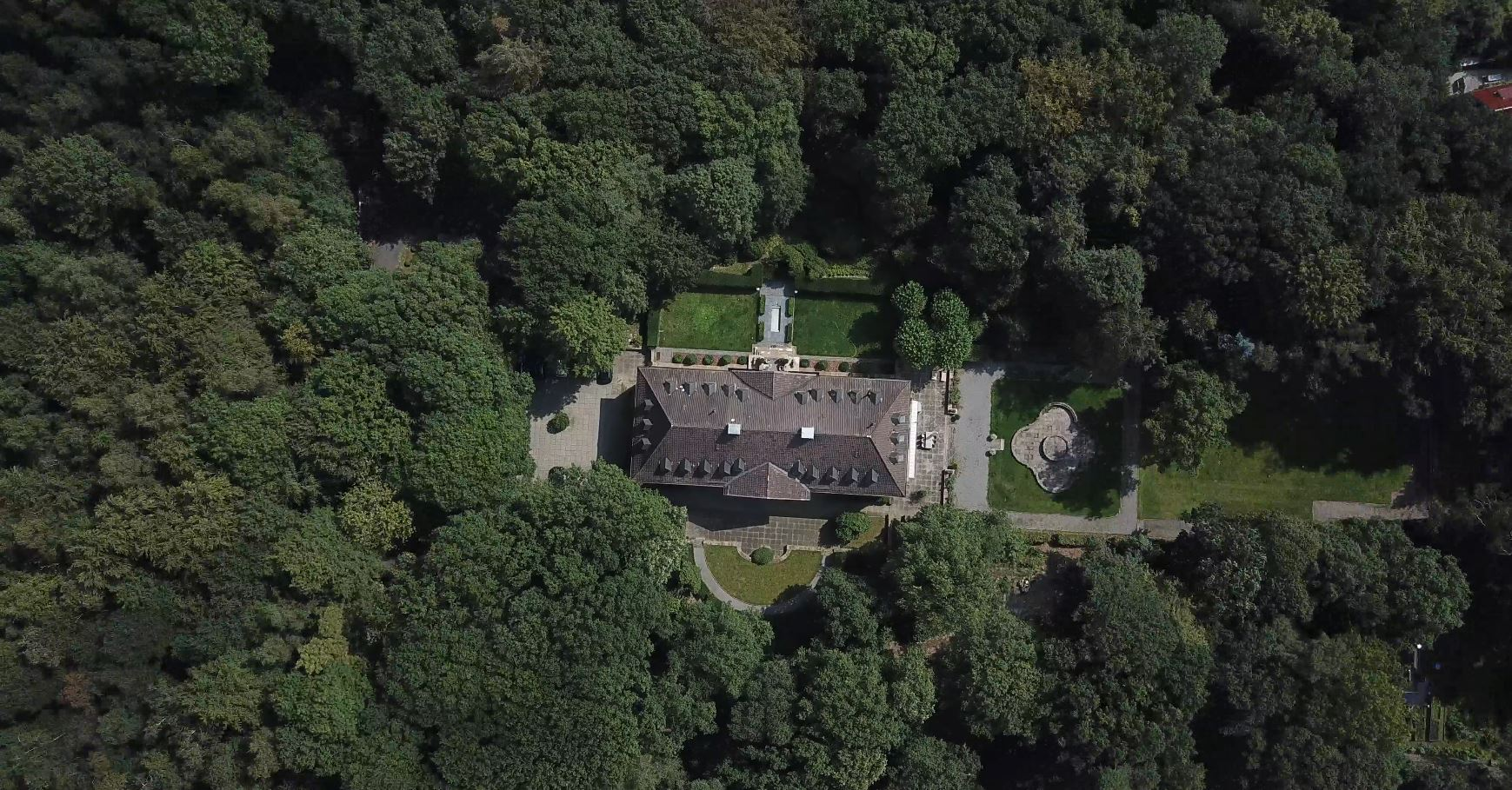
Haus Höhe, Briller Viertel, Wuppertal

Wuppertal-Elberfeld is regarded as the most devastated city during the Allied strategic bombing of Germany in the Second World War, in which a single primary raid was carried out and 1,795 tons of explosives were dropped. In that attack, 352 hectares of built-up area were destroyed, amounting to a level of devastation of 94 percent.

== Notable people ==
- Wolfgang Abendroth (1906–1988), socialist, jurist, and political scientist
- Greta Bösel (1908–1947), concentration camp guard executed for war crimes
- Arno Breker, sculptor
- Heinz Thilo, SS war criminal
- Werner Eggerath, East German politician
- Ernest Fiene (1894–1965), painter
- Karl Germer, Outer Head of Ordo Templi Orientis (1947–1962)
- Will Glahé, accordionist, composer, and bandleader
- Carl Grossberg, artist
- Hans Grüneberg (1907–1982), geneticist
- Theodor Hausmann (1880–1972), composer
- August von der Heydt (1801–1874), economist
- Eduard von der Heydt (1882–1964), banker
- Walter Kaufmann (physicist), physicist
- Gunild Keetman (1904-1990), music teacher and composer
- Hans Knappertsbusch, conductor
- Erich Koch, Nazi Party Gauleiter of East Prussia, Reichskommissar of Ukraine, convicted war criminal
- Hermann Friedrich Kohlbrugge, minister
- Friedrich Wilhelm Krummacher, minister
- Johann Peter Lange, Protestant theologian
- Else Lasker-Schüler (1869–1945), poet
- Hermann Marx (c.1881–1947), stockbroker and bibliophile
- Wilhelm Neumann-Torborg, sculptor
- Friedrich Philippi, historian
- Julius Plücker, mathematician and physicist
- Eugene Plumacher (1838–1910), emigrant to the United States, diplomat
- Sigurd Raschèr (1907–2001), saxophonist
- Paul Ortwin Rave (1893–1962), art historian and director of the Berlin National Gallery
- Fritz Roeber (1851–1924), painter
- Sir Hans Wolfgang Singer (1910–2006), economist
- Johannes Steele (1908–1988), journalist
- Horst Stein (1928–2008), conductor
- Horst Tappert (1923–2008), actor
- Edward Thonen (1827–1854), emigrant to Australia, leader of Eureka Rebellion
- Cläre Tisch (1907-1942/43), economist
- Günter Wand (1912–2002), conductor
- Armin T. Wegner (1886 – 1978), writer and human rights activist
- Carl Wirths (1897–1955), politician
- Sulamith Wülfing, artist

== See also ==
- Elberfeld system
