= Raúl Prebisch =

Argentine economist (1901–1986)

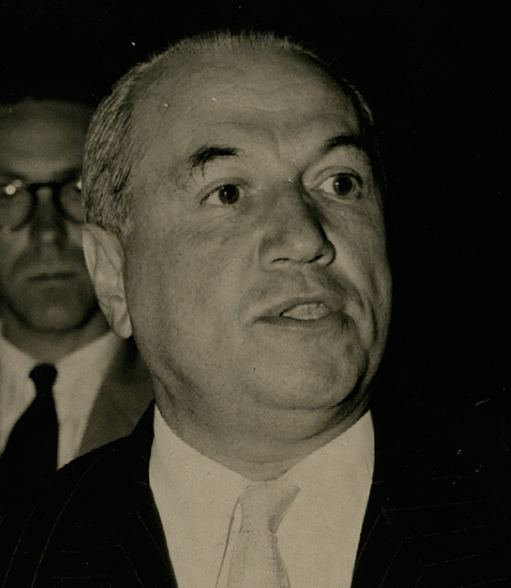
- Prebisch in 1954
- Born: April 17, 1901; San Miguel de Tucumán, Argentina
- Died: April 29, 1986 (aged 85); Santiago de Chile, Chile

Academic background
- Education: University of Buenos Aires

Academic work
- Discipline: Development economics
- School or tradition: Structuralist economics
- Notable ideas: Singer–Prebisch thesis

Raúl Prebisch (April 17, 1901 – April 29, 1986) was an Argentine economist known for his contributions to structuralist economics such as the Prebisch–Singer hypothesis, which formed the basis of economic dependency theory. He became the executive director of the Economic Commission for Latin America (ECLA or CEPAL) in 1950. In 1950, he also released the very influential study The Economic Development of Latin America and its Principal Problems.

== Early years ==
He was born in Tucumán, Argentina, to German settlers and studied at the University of Buenos Aires Faculty of Economic Sciences, where he later taught. His brother Alberto Prebisch became a well-known architect. As a young man his writing was marked by a complete adherence to the idea of free-trade but in the 1930s, as a result of the Great Depression he "converted" to protectionism. His previous beliefs had been supported by the spectacular economic growth of Argentina from the 1860s to 1920s as the country exported a large amount of beef and wheat to the United Kingdom. However, by the 1930s the Great Depression and the growing economic dominance of the United States, which exported beef and wheat rather than buying them, had significantly hurt the Argentinian economy.

== Centre and periphery ==
The plight of Argentina forced Prebisch to reexamine the principle of comparative advantage described by David Ricardo, marking the creation of a new school of economic thought in the late 1940s. Prebisch separated out the purely theoretical aspects of economics from the actual practice of trade and the power structures that underlie trading institutions and agreements. His resulting division of the world into the economic "centre", consisting of industrialised nations such as the U.S., and the "periphery", consisting of primary producers, remains used to this day. As president of the Central Bank of Argentina he had noticed that during the Great Depression the prices of primary products, such as agricultural goods, fell much more than the prices of manufactured secondary products. However, he and his colleagues were unable to specify the exact mechanism for the difference, beyond hypothesizing that supply conditions of primary and secondary goods were different in that while farmers planted the same amount every year regardless of the price they would get, manufacturers were able to reduce or increase capacity to respond to expected changes in demand.

However, these ideas remained unformed until he was appointed executive director of the Economic Commission for Latin America (ECLA or CEPAL) in 1950. In 1950, he released a study The Economic Development of Latin America and its Principal Problems that stated what is now known as the Prebisch–Singer hypothesis. German economist Hans Singer had separately arrived at a similar conclusion as Prebisch at roughly the same time, although his paper used a more empirical approach based on analysis of world trade statistics. The hypothesis begins with the observation that in the present world system the periphery produces primary goods to export to the center, and the centre produces secondary goods for export to the periphery. According to the hypothesis, as technology improves, the centre is able to retain the savings made, since it can retain higher wages and profits through developed unions and commercial institutions. At the periphery, companies and workers are weaker, and have to pass on technical savings to their customers in the form of lower prices. Prebisch pointed to the decline in the terms of trade between industrialised and non-industrialised countries, which meant peripheral nations had to export more to get the same value of industrial imports. Through this system, all of the benefits of technology and international trade would accrue to the centre.

Due to Prebisch's influence the ECLA became the center of Third World activism in the UN, giving birth to the Latin American school of structuralist economics. While many scholars perceive Prebisch as supporting import substitution industrialization (ISI), in which a nation progressively changes its imports and internal production, focusing on industrialization, at the cost of imported "superfluous" goods in favor of capital and intermediate goods for a given period of time, Prebisch criticized protectionism, especially that practiced by Juan Perón in Argentina, since 1956 and ISI since at least 1963. He advocated industrialization and economic cooperation, including through trade, among developing countries.

The International Institute of Social Studies (ISS) awarded its Honorary Fellowship to Raúl Prebisch in 1977.

== UNCTAD secretary-general ==
Between 1964 and 1969, he served as the founding secretary-general of the United Nations Conference on Trade and Development (UNCTAD). Selected for his unparalleled reputation, he tried to forge UNCTAD into a body advocating the case of the whole developing world. His approach to development took a more trade-focused approach, advocating preferential access to the markets of developed countries and regional integration, building up trade between peripheral countries. Increasingly he stressed the extent to which developing countries had to bring growth by internal reforms rather than through external help. He publicly condemned ISI as having failed to bring proper development. Prebisch found his years at UNCTAD frustrating and "sterile" as it became increasingly bureaucratic and failed to achieve its main objectives. His sudden resignation in 1969 signified his loss of patience with the organisation's failures.

== Dependency theory ==
During the 1960s, economists at the United Nations Economic Commission for Latin America and the Caribbean (ECLA) developed an extension of Prebisch's thoughts on structuralism into dependency theory, in which economic development of the periphery is seen as a nearly impossible task. While dependency theory is often seen to be opposed to the ECLA's original purpose, Prebisch's original framework was reformist, focused on improving developing nations' terms of trade through industrialization and regional integration. Dependency theorists drew directly on his center-periphery model. Prebisch's own thinking changed over time; by the 1970s, particularly through his work at UNCTAD, where he was increasingly critical of the international economic order about dependency concerns. Throughout, he continued to criticize the neo-classical economic forces that he felt were victimizing the global poor.

== Legacy ==
Prior to the takeover of Chile by the Augusto Pinochet regime, economic thought in the country, particularly the University of Chile, was dominated by his ideas.

== Works ==
- Prebisch, Raúl (1959). "Commercial Policy in the Underdeveloped Countries". American Economic Review. 49: 251–273.
- Raúl Prebisch, The Economic Development of Latin America and Its Principal Problems (New York: United Nations, 1950)
- Raúl Prebisch (1970). Change and Development: Latin America's Great Task. Inter-American Development Bank.
- Raúl Prebisch (1982). The crisis of capitalism and the periphery : text of the first lecture. (United Nations Conference on Trade and Development)
- Raúl Prebisch (1963). Towards a dynamic development policy for Latin America. (New York: United Nations)
- Raúl Prebisch (1964). Towards a new trade policy for development : report / by the Secretary-General of the United Nations Conference on Trade and Development .(New York: United Nations)
- Raúl Prebisch(1961). Economic development or monetary stability: the false dilemma.(United Nations)
- Raúl Prebisch(1987). Five Stages in My Thinking on Development.(United Nations)

== See also ==
- Import substitution industrialization
- Unequal exchange
- Samir Amin
- Celso Furtado
- Fair trade
- Money doctor
