= Thorborg =

Thorborg is a surname. Notable people with the surname include:

- Helle Thorborg (born 1927), Danish painter and graphic designer
- Karin Thorborg (born 1948), Swedish politician
- Kerstin Thorborg (1896–1970), Swedish opera singer
- Niels Thorborg (born 1964), Danish football chairman
- Søren Thorborg (1889–1978), Danish gymnast

== See also ==
- Torborg, a feminine given name and a surname
