= Prebisch–Singer hypothesis =

Economic hypothesis

In economics, the Prebisch–Singer hypothesis (also called the Prebisch–Singer thesis) argues that the price of primary commodities declines relative to the price of manufactured goods over the long term, which causes the terms of trade of primary-product-based economies to deteriorate. As of 2013, recent statistical studies have given support for the idea. The idea was developed by Raúl Prebisch and Hans Singer in the late 1940s; since that time, it has served as a major pillar of dependency theory and policies such as import substitution industrialization (ISI).

== Theory ==
A common explanation for this supposed phenomenon is that manufactured goods have a greater income elasticity of demand than primary products, especially food. Therefore, as incomes rise, the demand for manufactured goods increases more rapidly than demand for primary products.

In addition, primary products have a low price elasticity of demand, so a decline in their prices tends to reduce revenue rather than increase it.

This theory implies that the very structure of the global market is responsible for the persistent inequality within the world system. This provides an interesting twist on Wallerstein's neo-Marxist interpretation of the international order which faults differences in power relations between 'core' and 'periphery' states as the chief cause for economic and political inequality (However, the Prebisch-Singer thesis also works with different bargaining positions of labour in developed and developing countries).

Singer and Prebisch noticed a similar statistical pattern in long-run historical data on relative prices, but such regularity is consistent with a number of different explanations and policy stances. Later in his career, Prebisch argued that, due to the declining terms of trade primary producers face, developing countries should strive to diversify their economies and lessen dependence on primary commodity exports by developing their manufacturing industry

The hypothesis has lost some of its relevance in the last 30 years, as exports of simple manufactures have overtaken exports of primary commodities in most developing countries outside of Africa. For this reason, much of the recent research focuses less on the relative prices of primary products and manufactured goods, and more on the relationship between the prices of simple manufactures produced by developing countries and of complex manufactures produced by advanced economies.

In 1998, Singer argued that the thesis he pioneered has joined the mainstream:

One indication of this is that the PST is now incorporated, both implicitly and explicitly, in the advice given by the Bretton Woods Institutions to developing countries. They are warned to be prudent even when export prices are temporarily favourable and to guard against currency overvaluation and Dutch Disease, with all the unfavourable impact on the rest of the economy and all the dangers of macroeconomic instability which a sudden boom in a major export sector could imply. They are warned to remember that the outlook for commodity prices is not favourable and that windfalls will tend to be temporary, with the subsequent relapse likely to be greater than the temporary windfall. This is exactly the warning which the PST would give.

Recent statistical research has given the idea qualified support.

Justin Yifu Lin in the New Structural Economics (2012) proposes "limiting intervention to offsetting the externalities of first-movers."

== History ==
Prebisch's lectures from 1945 to 1949 revealed the development of the theoretical strands of his argument. What he did not have was a statistical argument. In February 1949, Hans Singer, then working in the United Nations Department of Economic Affairs in New York City, published a paper titled "Post-war Price Relations between Under-developed and Industrialized Countries", which suggested that the terms of trade of underdeveloped countries had declined significantly between 1876 and 1948. Inspired by this, Raúl Prebisch presented a paper of his own discussing the decline at the United Nations Economic Commission for Latin America and the Caribbeans second annual meeting, in Havana in May 1949.

Therefore, the statistical argument about the long-term trend in terms of trade of underdeveloped countries must be attributed to Singer. However, both seem to have independently invented similar explanations, stressing that the terms of trade moved against the 'borrowing' (i.e., underdeveloped) and in favour of the 'investing' (i.e., developed) countries. However, Prebisch specifically deals with the economic cycle and highlights to a greater extent than Singer the reasons for the different behaviour of wages in developed and underdeveloped countries, and received much greater recognition for his work, in part because of efforts by industrialized countries like the United States to distance themselves from his work.

== See also ==
- Celso Furtado
- Developmental economics
- Group of 77
- Structuralist economics
- United Nations Conference on Trade and Development (UNCTAD)
- Unequal exchange

== Other sources ==
- Ocampo, José Antonio, and Parra, María Angela. (2003) The Terms of Trade for Commodities in the Twentieth Century.
- United Nations Conference on Trade and Development (2005) Trade and Development Report Chapter 3: Evolution of the Terms of Trade and its Impact on Developing Countries.
