= Sudene =

Brazilian governmental agency

The Superintendency for the Development of the Northeast (Portuguese: Superintendência de Desenvolvimento do Nordeste), or Sudene (Portuguese pronunciation: [suˈdẽni]) for short, is a Brazilian governmental agency created in 1959, during the government of President Juscelino Kubitschek (1956–1961), to stimulate economic growth in the northeastern region of Brazil, one of the poorest of the country, that faces chronic droughts and has a semi-arid climate. Sudene was created by suggestion of economist Celso Furtado, one of the leading intellectuals of Brazil, who was the agency's first director.

== Premise ==
Furtado's premise was that the semi-arid climate of the Northeast was an environmental reality against which it would be very unproductive to fight – despite governmental action to take water to that region – and that state poverty reduction programs should thus aim at using the existing natural advantages of the area – namely, its availability of labor – and promote industrialization instead of the region's traditional economic focus, which was on agriculture and livestock.

== Actions ==
The agency's first steps were to speed up the construction of hydroelectric dams in the São Francisco River, followed by governmental incentives for the creation of heavy industry projects, such as the Camaçari Petrochemical Complex, in the state of Bahia, and the industrial district of Aratu, in the metropolitan area of Salvador. Sudene is also responsible for the formation of intermediary products industries: fertilizers production in the state of Sergipe and a chemicals complex in Salgema, state of Alagoas. In the state of Pernambuco, investments concentrated on the metropolitan area of the city of Recife, with durable goods industries being created in the cities of Jaboatão, Cabo and Paulista. In the state of Ceará, a new perspective was adopted: Sudene's incentives helped form a textiles industrial area, around the capital of the state, Fortaleza.

In 1999, Sudene was involved in corruption scandals which led President Fernando Henrique Cardoso (1994–2002) to decree its dissolution. In 2002, however, the agency was recreated with the name of Adene - Agency for the Development of the Northeast.
