= Wilhelm Neumann-Torborg =

German sculptor

Wilhelm Neumann-Torborg (born 24 August 1856 in Elberfeld; died 31 December 1917 in Elberfeld) was a German sculptor whose works are still well-known.

== Biography ==
Wilhelm Neumann-Torborg grew up in Wuppertal, Germany, the son of a school headmaster. He attended evening classes at the Royal Provincial Vocational School in Elberfeld, where he received his first lessons in drawing and painting.

He spent the years 1874 and 1877 studying in Bad Kreuznach, in the sculpture workshop of the brothers Robert and Karl Cauer. He then further developed his craft in 1878 under Melchior zur Strassen in the Leipzig Academy of Visual Arts and until 1880 in the Academy of Arts, Berlin with Otto Knille and Fritz Schaper. In 1885, he won the Rome Scholarship from the Prussian Academy of Arts for his thesis, "The Judgment of Paris".

In subsequent years, Neumann-Torborg lived and worked in Rome, where his wife, Emma Commichau, died after a short marriage. In 1892, the artist returned to Berlin. In 1917, he fell seriously ill and died during a visit to his hometown of Elberfeld. His tomb is located in the Lutheran cemetery in Wuppertal-Elberfeld.

== Works ==
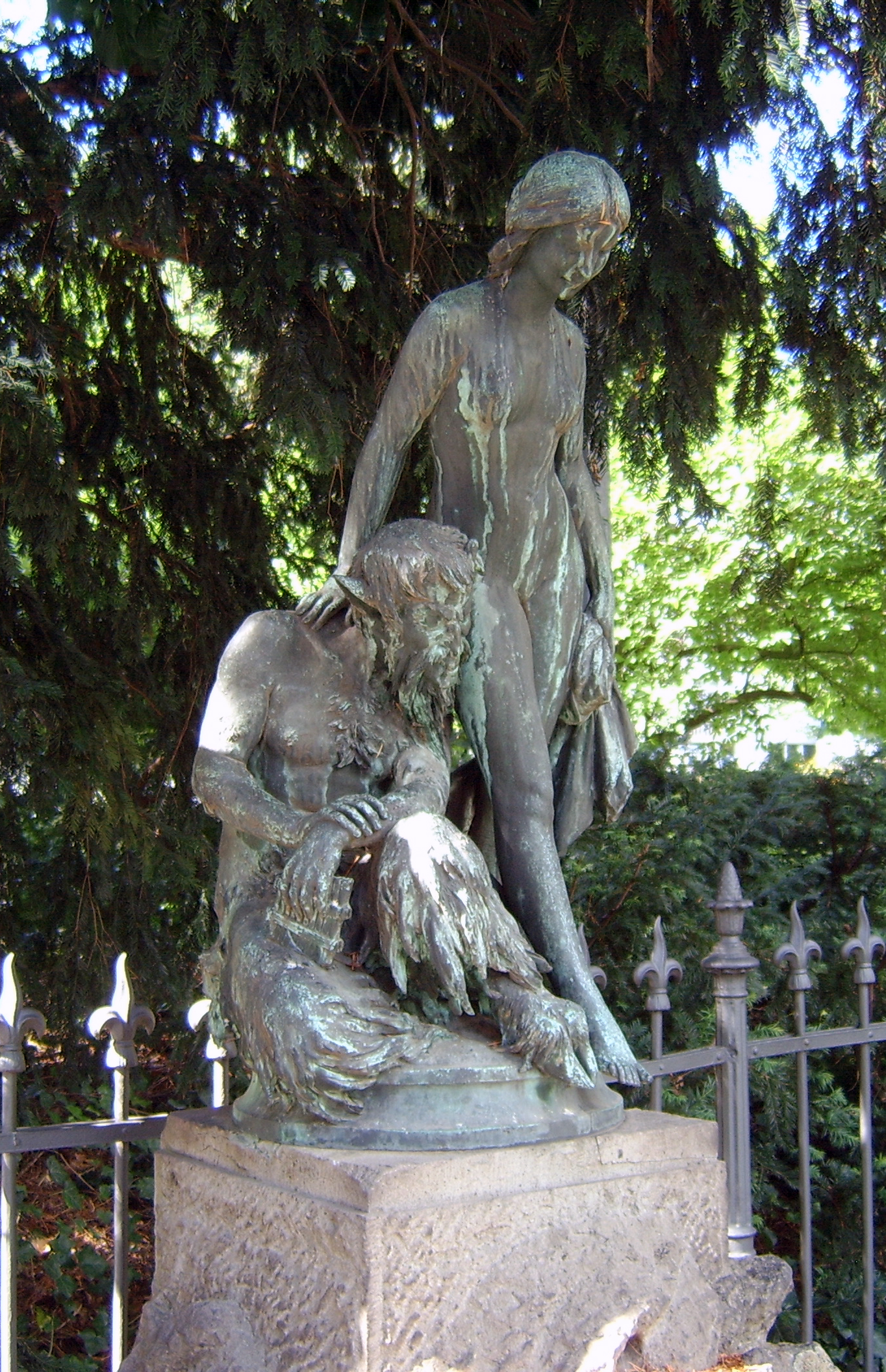
Bronze sculpture "Faun and Nymph" by Wilhelm Neumann-Torborg

- 1884 The Butterfly Hunter
- 1885 The Judgment of Paris, Relief
- 1890 Psyche, Marble
- 1892 or 1900 Faun and Nymph, Bronze
- 1903 Monument to Wilhelm Dörpfeld
- 1903 The Elberfelder Poor Relief Monument, Bronze (destroyed during the Second World War)
- 1905 Colossal bust of the Empress Augusta Victoria (destroyed by bombing in June 1943)
- 1911 Monument to Reinhardt Schmitt

Many of Neumann-Torborgs works were destroyed during the Second World War.

Perhaps his best-known work, the fountain "Faun and Nymph", was commissioned by Baron August von der Heydt and originally stood in the park of his estate. It survived the Second World War unscathed and since 1909 has been on display in Bad Godesberg, Bonn. In 2013, it was restored and moved to a new location to permit greater public access.

Another relief of Neuman-Torborg's, showing dancing youths with Bacchus, was installed in the Bad Godesberg city park in 2014. The sculpture includes a bench and a bust of Roman Emperor Marcus Aurelius Probus, and was recovered in pieces from the van der Heydt estate.

The "Elberfeld Poor Relief Monument" was destroyed during the war, when the bronze figures were melted down for metal. In 2003, the granite pedestal of the monument was rediscovered during excavations at the Elberfeld Old Reformed Church, and placed on display in Blankstrasse, Wuppertal. In 2011, it was restored thanks to 24 private donations. The bronze figures were recast at the Kayser Art Foundry in Düsseldorf. The statue commemorates the inauguration, in 1853, of the Elberfeld system of poor relief, which was copied by many cities in subsequent years.

== Bibliography ==
- Denkmäler, Brunnen und Plastiken in Wuppertal: Biographien der beteiligten Künstler by Ruth Meyer-Kahrweg. Wuppertal 1991, pp. 110ff.
- Das Armendenkmal von Elberfeld im Wandel der Denkmalkultur um 1900 by Cécile Zachlod. In Geschichte im Wuppertal, 16th edition, 2007. pp. 25–30.
