= Arthur Spiethoff =

German economist (1873–1957)

Arthur Spiethoff (13 May 1873, Düsseldorf – 4 April 1957, Tübingen) was a German economist, born in Düsseldorf. He studied economics at the University of Berlin, and later taught at the German University of Prague and University of Bonn.

He was an assistant to Gustav von Schmoller.
