= Celso Furtado =

Brazilian economist (1920–2004)

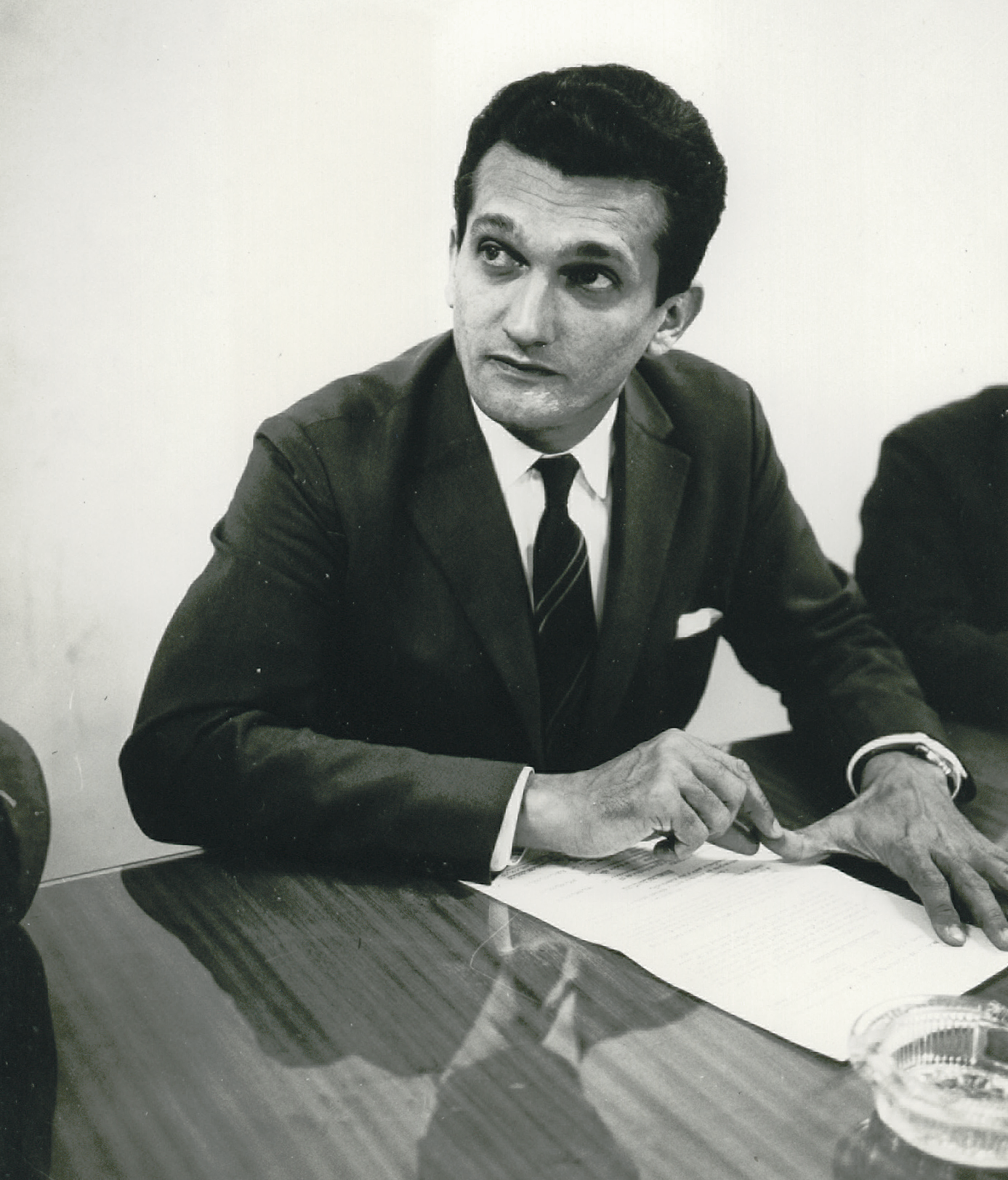
- Celso Furtado in 1962

Minister of Planning
- In office 28 September 1962 – 31 March 1964
- President: João Goulart
- Preceded by: Office established
- Succeeded by: Roberto Campos

Personal details
- Born: 26 July 1920 Pombal, Paraíba, Brazil
- Died: 20 November 2004 (aged 84) Rio de Janeiro, Rio de Janeiro, Brazil
- Education: University of Paris

Academic background
- Influences: John Maynard Keynes, Raúl Prebisch

Academic work
- Discipline: Economics
- School or tradition: Structuralist economics
- Institutions: University of Cambridge, CEPAL, Sudene, Cabinet of Brazil, University of Paris

Celso Monteiro Furtado (July 26, 1920 – November 20, 2004) was a Brazilian economist and one of the most distinguished intellectuals of the 20th century. His work focuses on development and underdevelopment and on the persistence of poverty in peripheral countries throughout the world. He is viewed, along with Raúl Prebisch, as one of the main formulators of economic structuralism, an economics school that is largely identified with CEPAL, which achieved prominence in Latin America and other peripheric regions during the 1960s and 1970s and sought to stimulate economic development through governmental intervention, largely inspired on the views of John Maynard Keynes. As a politician, Furtado was appointed Minister of Planning (Goulart administration) and Minister of Culture (Sarney administration).

== Biography ==
Born in Pombal, a city set in the semi-arid region of the state of Paraíba, Celso Furtado moved to Rio de Janeiro in 1939, to study law, and graduated from the Federal University of Rio de Janeiro (UFRJ) in 1944. That same year, he was conscripted to the Brazilian Expeditionary Force to fight in Italy, during World War II, alongside the Allies. Seeing countries destroyed in post-war Europe had a profound impact on him, leading to the decision that he would study Economics: he enrolled in a doctorate program at the University of Paris (Sorbonne), in 1946, and presented a thesis on the economy of Brazil during the colonial period.

In 1949, he moved to Santiago, Chile, where he joined the team of the newly created United Nations Economic Commission for Latin America and the Caribbean (best known by its Latin American acronym, CEPAL), which was then headed by Argentine economist Raúl Prebisch. While working at CEPAL, Furtado and Prebisch were decisive for the formulation of socioeconomic policies for the development of Latin America which emphasized industrialization and import substitution.

Upon his return to Brazil in 1959, he published his most famous book – The Economic Growth of Brazil: A Survey from Colonial to Modern Times (in Portuguese: Formação Econômica do Brasil) – and was appointed the director of the Brazilian Development Bank (BNDE) in charge of issues concerning states of the northeastern region, which are poor and face chronic droughts and desertification. During this period, he developed a plan which resulted in the creation of the Superintendency for the Development of the Northeast (Sudene), a governmental agency that worked to stimulate economic growth in that region, and was appointed by Brazilian president Juscelino Kubitschek (1956–1961) the agency's first director. During the presidency of João Goulart (1961–1964), Furtado became Brazil’s first Minister of Planning in the newly created ministry and was responsible for the Triennial Plan.

Furtado was also one of the founders of the United Nations Conference on Trade and Development (UNCTAD), an intergovernmental body created in 1964, whose work has since centered around issues related to development and the asymmetries of international trade.

With the Brazilian military coup d'état, in 1964, he was forced into exile and worked as professor at Yale University, in the United States, and later at Cambridge University and the University of Paris (Sorbonne), in France. After the Law of Amnesty, in 1979, he returned to Brazil and was appointed Ambassador of Brazil at the EEC, in Brussels (1985–1986) and Minister of Culture in the government of president José Sarney (1985–1990).

In 2004, Celso Furtado was nominated to the Nobel Prize of Economics (Bank of Sweden Prize in Economic Sciences).

== Published books ==
Furtado published more than 30 books during his lifetime.

- Contos da vida expedicionária – de Nápoles a Paris. RJ, Zelio Valverde, 1946
- A economia brasileira. RJ, A Noite, 1954
- Uma economia dependente. RJ, Ministério da Educação e Cultura, 1956
- Perspectivas da economia brasileira. RJ, Instituto Superior de Estudos Brasileiros, 1958
- Formação econômica do Brasil. RJ, Fundo de Cultura, 1959
  - Other editions:
    - Formação econômica do Brasil. 14ª ed. São Paulo: Companhia Editora Nacional, 1976.
    - Formação econômica do Brasil. 24ª ed. São Paulo: Companhia Editora Nacional, 1991.
    - Formação econômica do Brasil. 34ª ed. São Paulo: Companhia das Letras, 2007.
- A Operação Nordeste. RJ, Instituto Superior de Estudos Brasileiros, 1959
- Uma política de desenvolvimento econômico para o Nordeste. RJ, Imprensa Nacional, 1959
- Desenvolvimento e subdesenvolvimento. RJ, Fundo de Cultura, 1961
- Subdesenvolvimento e Estado democrático. Recife, Condepe, 1962
- A pré-revolução brasileira. RJ, Fundo de Cultura, 1962
- Dialética do desenvolvimento. RJ, Fundo de Cultura, 1964
- Subdesenvolvimento e estagnação na América Latina. RJ, Civilização Brasileira, 1966.
- Teoria e política do desenvolvimento econômico. SP, Editora Nacional, 1967
- Um projeto para o Brasil. RJ, Saga, 1968
- Formação econômica da América Latina. RJ, Lia Editora, 1969
- Análise do "modelo" brasileiro. RJ, Civilização Brasileira, 1972
- A hegemonia dos Estados Unidos e o subdesenvolvimento da América Latina. RJ, Civilização Brasileira, 1973
- O mito do desenvolvimento econômico. RJ, Paz e Terra, 1974
- A economia latino-americana. SP, Editora Nacional, 1976
  - Other editions:
    - A economia latino-americana. 4ª ed. São Paulo: Companhia das Letras, 2007
- Criatividade e dependência na civilização industrial. RJ, Paz e Terra, 1978
  - Other editions:
    - Criatividade e dependência. São Paulo: Círculo do Livro, 1980
    - Criatividade e dependência. 2ª ed. São Paulo: Companhia das Letras, 2008
- O Brasil pós-"milagre". RJ, Paz e Terra, 1981
- A nova dependência, dívida externa e monetarismo. RJ, Paz e Terra, 1982
- Não à recessão e ao desemprego. RJ, Paz e Terra, 1983
- Cultura e desenvolvimento em época de crise. RJ, Paz e Terra, 1984
- A fantasia organizada. RJ, Paz e Terra, 1985
- A fantasia desfeita. SP, Paz e Terra, 1989
- Transformação e crise na economia mundial. SP, Paz e Terra, 1987
- ABC da dívida externa. SP, Paz e Terra, 1989
- Os ares do mundo. SP, Paz e Terra, 1991
- Brasil, a construção interrompida. SP, Paz e Terra, 1992
- Obra autobiográfica de Celso Furtado, 3 vol., ed. de Rosa Freire d'Aguiar. SP, Paz e Terra, 1997
- O capitalismo global. SP, Paz e Terra, 1998
- O longo amanhecer. SP, Paz e Terra, 1999
- Em busca de um novo modelo. SP, Paz e Terra, 2002

== English translations ==
- The Myth of Economic Development (2020), translation: Jordan B. Jones, Polity Press
- The Economic Growth of Brazil: A Survey from Colonial to Modern Times (1963), Los Angeles: University of California Press
- Development and Underdevelopment (1964), Los Angeles: University of California Press
- The Colonial Economy In Brazil In the centuries XVI and XVII
- Accumulation and Development: The Logic of Industrial Civilization (1983), Oxford: Martin Robertson
- Economic Development of Latin America: A Survey from Colonial Times to the Cuban Revolution (1970), 2nd ed.: 2003, translation: Suzette Macedo, Cambridge University Press
- No to Recession and Unemployment: An Examination of the Brazilian Economic Crisis (1984), London: TW Foundation
- Global Capitalism (1998), translation: Jorge Navarrete, ©1999, Fondo de Cultura Economica, Mexico

(with Sue Branford)

- Obstacles to development in Latin America (1970), New York: Anchor Books-Doubleday
- Diagnosis of the Brazilian Crisis (1965), Los Angeles: University of California Press

== Analysis ==
The Economic Growth of Brazil (original title, Formação Econômica do Brasil) is his best known book and considered by many to be a national classic. First published in 1959, it depicts Brazil's economic history and the causes of underdevelopment.

In O Mito do Desenvolvimento Econômico (The myth of economic development, in Portuguese), published in 1974, Furtado almost prophetically refers to the "globalisation of the world economy" ("mundialização da economia") when describing the ongoing economic process known today as globalization and raises questions about issues we experience today:

1) The myth of economic development versus the need for natural resources for economic processes: it is mistaken to think that economic development and its benefits will some day reach everyone in the world if the model of economic development does not change. For instance, there are not sufficient natural resources available for everyone in the world if we take as a benchmark the economic model on which the economy was based in the 1970s and is also based currently, i.e. the model where consumerism and individualism are the basis for corporate actions. For instance, if everybody could afford to buy a car, our cities would be completely gridlocked. Furtado's critique of the myths of economic development was based on a report of the Club of Rome, which is summarized in Abstract of The limits to Growth: a report to The Club of Rome;

2) On poverty: in countries that have no "central" economies (countries that are not the base for giant corporations), at most 10% of population could reach the level of wealth achieved by people in the richest countries. Peripheral economies, which would not create an independent and more complete economy, would remain poor and experience growing disparities between their poor and their rich inhabitants;

3) On the world economic superstructure: The world superstructure of the capitalist economy (mainly IMF and GATT, which gave rise to the WTO (World Trade Organization) would, on the one hand, increase control over the world economy, also increasing freedom for capital flows and for the actions of big corporations, while, on the other hand, it would reduce the number of possible choices available for governments, mainly for poor country's governments. This is the kind of development that has been taking place for the last 30 years.

== Works ==
- "The economic formation of Brazil", in Portuguese
