= Terms of trade =

Economic measure

The terms of trade (TOT) is the relative price of exports in terms of imports and is defined as the ratio of export prices to import prices. It can be interpreted as the amount of import goods an economy can purchase per unit of export goods.

An improvement of a nation's terms of trade benefits that country in the sense that it can buy more imports for any given level of exports. The terms of trade may be influenced by the exchange rate because a rise in the value of a country's currency lowers the domestic prices of its imports but may not directly affect the prices of the commodities it exports.

== History ==
The expression terms of trade was first coined by the US American economist Frank William Taussig in his 1927 book International Trade. However, an earlier version of the concept can be traced back to the English economist Robert Torrens and his book The Budget: On Commercial and Colonial Policy, published in 1844, as well as to John Stuart Mill's essay Of the Laws of Interchange between Nations; and the Distribution of Gains of Commerce among the Countries of the Commercial World, published in the same year, though allegedly already written in 1829/30.

== Definition ==
Terms of trade (TOT) is a measure of how many imports an economy can get for a unit of exported goods. For example, if an economy is only exporting apples and only importing oranges, then the terms of trade are simply the price of apples divided by the price of oranges — in other words, how many oranges can be obtained for a unit of apples. Since economies export and import many goods, measuring the TOT requires defining price indices for exported and imported goods and comparing the two.

A rise in the prices of exported goods in international markets would increase the TOT, while a rise in the prices of imported goods would decrease it. For example, countries that export oil will see an increase in their TOT when oil prices go up, while the TOT of countries that import oil would decrease.

== Two country model CIE economics ==
In the simplified case of two countries and two commodities, terms of trade is defined as the ratio of the total export revenue a country receives for its export commodity to the total import revenue it pays for its import commodity. In this case, the imports of one country are the exports of the other country. For example, if a country exports 50 dollars' worth of product in exchange for 100 dollars' worth of imported product, that country's terms of trade are 50/100 = 0.5. The terms of trade for the other country must be the reciprocal (100/50 = 2). When this number is falling, the country is said to have "deteriorating terms of trade". If multiplied by 100, these calculations can be expressed as a percentage (50% and 200% respectively). If a country's terms of trade fall from say 100% to 70% (from 1.0 to 0.7), it has experienced a 30% deterioration in its terms of trade. For longitudinal comparisons, terms-of-trade series are indexed to a common base year; for example, the World Bank's UNCTAD-sourced series uses 2015 = 100.

In basic microeconomics, the terms of trade are usually set in the interval between the opportunity costs for the production of a given good of two nations.

Terms of trade is the ratio of a country's export price index to its import price index, multiplied by 100. The terms of trade measures the rate of exchange of one good or service for another when two countries trade with each other.

== Multi-commodity multi-country model ==
The terms of trade of Australia since 1959. Note the effect of the resources boom from 2005.

In the more realistic case of many products exchanged between many countries, terms of trade can be calculated using a Laspeyres index. In this case, a nation's terms of trade is the ratio of the Laspeyres price index of exports to the Laspeyres price index of imports. The Laspeyres export index is the current value of the base period exports divided by the base period value of the base period exports. Similarly, the Laspeyres import index is the current value of the base period imports divided by the base period value of the base period imports.

$$({{p_x^c\, q_x^0}\over{p_x^0\, q_x^0}}
\left/
{{p_m^c\, q_m^0}\over{p_m^0\, q_m^0}})*100\right.$$

Where

$p_x^c=$ price of exports in the current period

$q_x^0=$ quantity of exports in the base period

$p_x^0=$ price of exports in the base period

$p_m^c=$ price of imports in the current period

$q_m^0=$ quantity of imports in the base period

$p_m^0=$ price of imports in the base period

== Limitations ==
Terms of trade should not be used as synonymous with social welfare, or even Pareto economic welfare. Terms of trade calculations do not tell us about the volume of the countries' exports, only relative changes between countries. To understand how a country's social utility changes, it is necessary to consider changes in the volume of trade, changes in productivity and resource allocation, and changes in capital flows.

The price of exports from a country can be heavily influenced by the value of its currency, which can in turn be heavily influenced by the interest rate in that country. If the value of currency of a particular country is increased due to an increase in interest rate one can expect the terms of trade to improve. However, this may not necessarily mean an improved standard of living for the country since an increase in the price of exports perceived by other nations will result in a lower volume of exports. As a result, exporters in the country may actually be struggling to sell their goods in the international market even though they are enjoying a (supposedly) high price.

In the real world of over 200 nations trading hundreds of thousands of products, terms of trade calculations can get very complex. Thus, the possibility of errors is significant.

== See also ==
- Singer–Prebisch thesis about the tendency to deterioration of the terms of trade between primary products and manufactured goods.
