= Andy Sumner =

Published economist

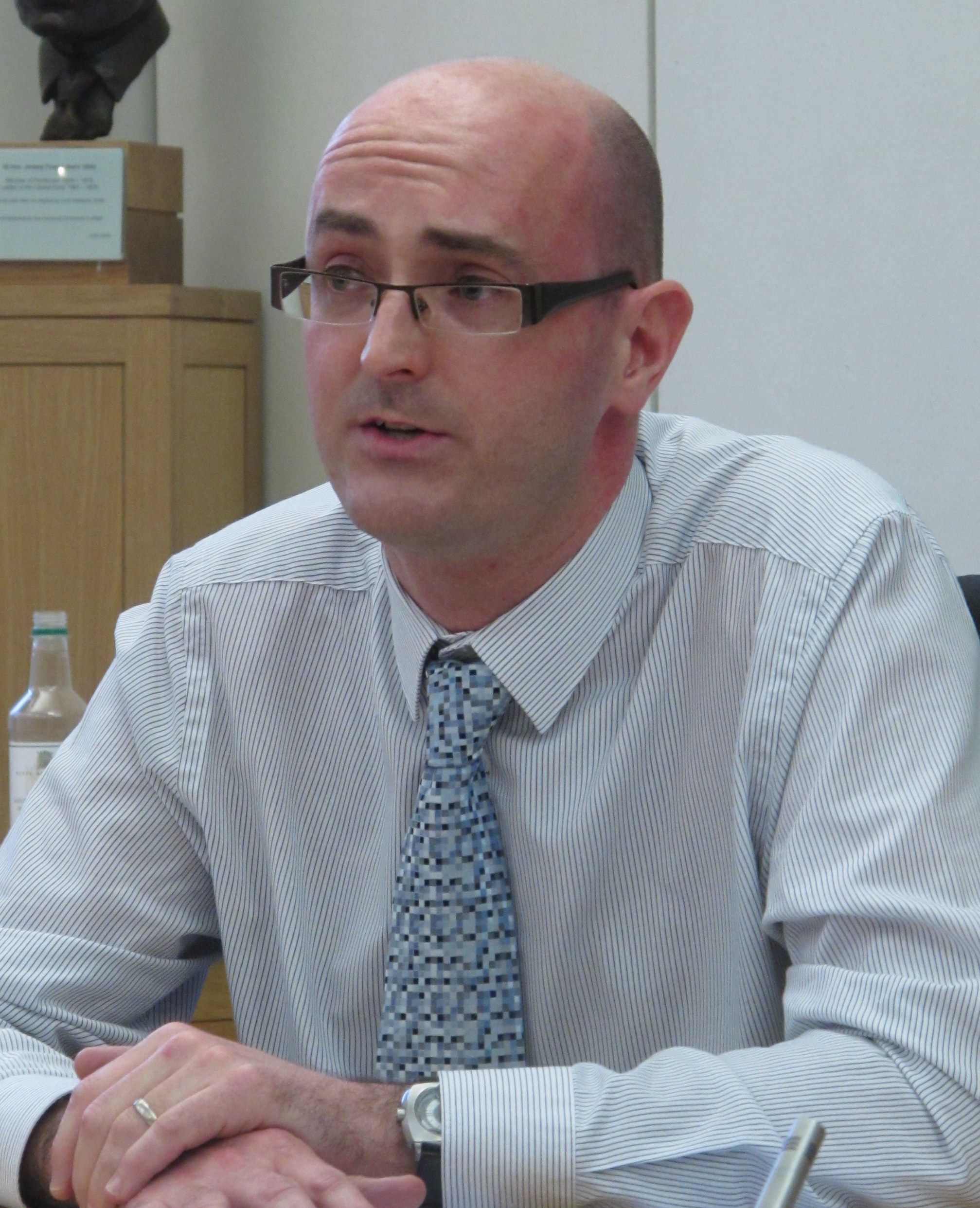

Academic background
- Influences: Simon Kuznets, W. Arthur Lewis, Celso Furtado

Academic work
- Discipline: International development

Andy Sumner is an inter-disciplinary development economist. He has published extensively on global poverty, inequality and economic development including ten books.

His research is at the interface of development studies and development economics, with a particular focus on middle-income developing countries and the analysis of poverty and inequality within the processes of economic development and structural transformation.

His research has been cited by non-governmental organisations (NGOs), by international development agencies such as the World Bank and UN agencies, and by media including The Economist. He has also been asked to contribute expertise to various policy-related processes such as the Select Committees of the House of Commons, the UN Intergovernmental Panel on Climate Change, and a Lancet Poverty Commission, and he has been listed in US magazine Foreign Policy’s ‘Top 100 Global Thinkers’, and in the Huffington Post’s ‘Most Influential Voices’.

Sumner is a Professor in International Development in the Department of International Development, King's College London which he set up with Peter Kingstone. He holds associate positions at the Oxford Poverty and Human Development Initiative, University of Oxford, the Center for Global Development in Washington, D.C, UNU-WIDER and Padjadjaran University, Indonesia.

Sumner is director of the Economic and Social Research Council (ESRC) Global Challenges Strategic Research Network on Global Poverty and Inequality Dynamics and a member of the ESRC Peer Review College. He was co-director of the Department of International Development, King's College London from 2012 to 2016. Prior to King's he was a research fellow at the Institute of Development Studies at the University of Sussex. From 1998 to 2014 Sumner served as council member of the Development Studies Association (DSA) and from 2008 to 2014 he was UK representative and vice president of the European Association of Development Research and Training Institutes (EADI). Sumner is deputy editor and an editorial board member of the journal Global Policy. He is also a board member of the Journal of International Development, and of the European Journal of Development Research and book series co-editor for Palgrave Macmillan’s 'Rethinking International Development'.

== Work ==
Sumner's contemporary research focuses on:

1. global poverty and inequality;
2. inclusive growth and structural change in Southeast Asia (Indonesia, Malaysia and Thailand);
3. the relationship between poverty, inequality and economic development.

A central theme of his work is the persistence of poverty in middle-income countries and the implications of national inequality for poverty and theories of poverty. His research seeks to reconnect the analysis of poverty and inequality with the study of economic development and structural transformation.

Sumner’s research has had an impact on the understandings of, and approaches to global poverty and inequality in terms of their understandings of where much of the world's poverty is located, theories of the cause of poverty, and the growing importance of national inequality in understanding absolute poverty.

His is particularly known for his research that focused on the fact that about a billion people or three-quarters of the poor live in middle-income countries which he termed the “new bottom billion”. This finding raised questions about the distributional patterns of economic growth, the divorce of much foreign aid from world poverty and about the dominant country analytical categories. It has contributed to a changed understanding of global poverty. His work argues that absolute poverty is a distributional outcome of specific patterns of economic development and welfare regimes.

Together with Alex Cobham he proposed a new measure of inequality linked more closely to poverty, the Palma ratio based on the work of Gabriel Palma. This new measure of inequality is now reported annually as a standard measure in the statistical databases of the OECD, the UNDP and the UK Office of National Statistics.

His work has been discussed in media outlets such as The Economist, The Guardian, the Voice of America, BBC News and The Washington Post.

== Publications ==
=== Selected books ===
- Sumner, A. (2018) Development and Distribution: Structural Change in Southeast Asia. Oxford and New York: Oxford University Press. ISBN 9780198792369.
- Sumner, A. (2016) Global poverty: Deprivation, distribution and development. Oxford and New York: Oxford University Press. ISBN 9780198703525.

=== Selected articles ===
- Edward, P. and Sumner, A. (2018) ‘Global Poverty and Inequality: Are the Revised Estimates Open to an Alternative Interpretation?’ Third World Quarterly. 39.3: 487-509
- Hoy, C. and Sumner A. (2016) ‘Global Poverty and Inequality: Is There New Capacity for Redistribution in Developing Countries?’ Journal of Globalization and Development 7.1: 117–57.
- Sumner, A. (2016) Why are some people poor? European Journal of Development Research 28: 130-142
- Cobham, A., Schlogl, L., and Sumner, A. (2016) Inequality and the Tails: the Palma Proposition and Ratio. Global Policy 7(1): 201-211.
- Edward, P. and Sumner, A. (2014) ‘Estimating the scale and geography of global poverty now and in the future: How much difference do method and assumptions make?’, World Development 58: 67-82.
- Vázquez, S. and Sumner, A. (2013) ‘Revisiting the Meaning of Development: A Multidimensional Taxonomy of Developing Countries’. Journal of Development Studies 49.12: 1728–45.
- Sumner, A. (2013) https://www.tandfonline.com/doi/abs/10.1080/01436597.2013.784593 Third World Quarterly, 34.3: 357-377
- Sumner, A. (2012) ‘Where do the Poor Live?’, World Development. 40.5: 865–877
- Kanbur, R. and Sumner, A. (2012) ‘Poor Countries or Poor People? Development Assistance and the New Geography of Global Poverty’, Journal of International Development, 24.6: 686-695

== See also ==
- Economic development
- Economic growth
- Structural change
- Structural transformation
- The New Bottom Billion
- Development studies
- Emerging Markets
- Palma Ratio
