= Department of International Development, King's College London =

UK academic institution

Coordinates: 51.513078°N 0.116656°W

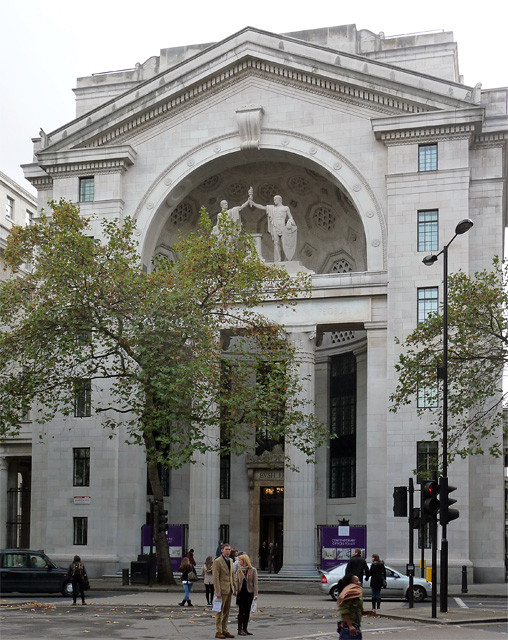
- Established: 2012
- Parent institution: King's College London
- Directors: Prof. Susan Fairley Murray
- Location: Bush House, London
- Website: www.kcl.ac.uk/did

The Department of International Development (DID), formerly known as King's International Development Institution, is an inter-disciplinary development department located within the Faculty of Social Science and Public Policy in the School of Global Affairs at King's College London. DID was launched in 2012 and became the Department of International Development in 2016 with a focus on the phenomena faced by middle-income developing countries. DID is a young, innovative, and contemporary development studies department that is the first research centre in the UK that mixes development studies and emerging markets. Its research revolves around development theory, political economy, economics, business, management, geography, and social policy.

DID has students from 50 countries worldwide, who make half of all the student body. The department is a member of European Association of Development Research and Training Institutes and is a premium member of Development Studies Association (DSA). It has strong links with the Department for International Development, British Academy, Oxfam and UNDP, while its staff holds associate positions at Harvard University, UC Berkeley, Center for Global Development and the Institute of Development Studies. The Department of International Development at King's College London, despite being the most recently established department of international development among UK universities, has achieved impressive recognition. With a decade of existence, it is ranked among the top 10 global development learning programmes in the UK and among the top 30 universities worldwide for development studies according to the QS University Ranking in 2024.

== Structure ==
DID is a department focusing on middle income developing countries or ‘emerging economies’ with close connections to King's College London's Global Institutes who are also housed in the School of Global Affairs, offering programmes at undergraduate and graduate level.

=== Notable academic staff ===
- Andy Sumner
- Alfredo Saad-Filho

== Research ==
DID is distinctive for its interest in rising middle income developing countries (like the BRICs) as well as in social, political, and economic phenomena in conjunction with policy related questions of those fast-growing developing countries. The department’s mission is “to explore the sources of success in emerging economies as well as understand the major development challenges they continue to face”.

The core research areas that have been identified include:

- History and theories of development (especially development economics, politics, and sociology)
- Poverty, inequality, social justice and distribution
- Gender and development
- The environment, resource extraction and climate change
- The role of manufacturing, industrialisation and deindustrialisation, technological change and the structure of employment
- Global networks, value chains, entrepreneurship and transnational firms
- Government, governance and public policy
- Regional and country-level development: South, Southeast, and Northeast Asia, Latin America, Africa, the Middle East; as well as China, India, Indonesia, Brazil, and more.

DID publishes a working paper series and has links to various external organisations including institutions like the UK Foreign Office and the UK Department for International Development, the British Academy, the European Association of Development Institutes, the UK Development Studies Association, the US Council on Foreign Relations, United Nations Development Programme, the United Nations University, the World Health Organization, the World Bank, and various international non-governmental and research organisations.

Notable publications include:

- The Handbook of Latin American Politics : Co-edited with Deborah Yashar. London: Routledge Press, 2012
- Democratic Brazil Revisited. Co-edited with Timothy J. Power. Pittsburgh: University of Pittsburgh Press, 2008.
- Human Rights and the Millennium Development Goals : Edited by Malcolm Langford (Oslo), with Alicia Ely Yamin (Harvard), 2013
- The Future of Foreign Aid: Development Cooperation and the New Geography of Global Poverty: with Richard Mallett. Basingstoke: Palgrave Macmillan, 2012
- Intersecting Inequalities. Women and Social Policy in Peru 1990-2000. Penn State University Press, 2010.
- Sexual Violence During War and Peace. Gender, Power and Postconflict Justice in Peru. Palgrave Studies of the Americas Series, 2014.
- Operating in Emerging Markets: A Guide to Management and Strategy in the New International Economy, FT Press, 2013.
- Promoting Silicon Valleys in Latin America: lessons from Costa Rica, Routledge 2012
- Contesting Epidemics : How Brazil outpaced the United States in its Policy Response, what the BRICS can learn, and the Politics of Global Health Diplomacy, Imperial College Press, 2015
- Decentralization in Asia and Latin America: Towards a Comparative Inter-Disciplinary Perspective, with George Peterson (eds), Edward Elgar Press, 2006
- Informal Coalitions and Policymaking in Latin America. Routledge: New York, 2009
- Debates on the Measurement of Global Poverty, with Sudhir Anand, and Joseph E. Stiglitz, Oxford University Press, 2010

== Academics ==
The Department of International Development currently offers the following programmes:

- BA International Development (founding programme)
- MSc Emerging Economies and International Development (founding programme)
- MSc Political Economy of Emerging Markets (founding programme)
- MPhil/PhD Development Studies with reference to Emerging Markets (founding programme)

New programmes

- MA Development Studies — started in 2023
- MA International Development (Online) — started in 2024

== See also ==
- Development studies
- Emerging market
- Development theory
- Developing country
- Political economy
- Inclusive growth
- Institutional Economics
- Economic History
