= Brooks World Poverty Institute =

Research centre at the University of Manchester

- Formation: 2005
- Type: Development research centre
- Headquarters: Arthur Lewis Building Oxford Rd. Manchester M13 9PL
- Location: Manchester, United Kingdom
- Executive director: David Hulme
- Website: www.bwpi.manchester.ac.uk

The Brooks World Poverty Institute (BWPI) is a research centre at the University of Manchester dedicated to multidisciplinary research on poverty, inequality and growth. It was established in 2005 following the donation of £1.3 million to the university by the Rory and Elizabeth Brooks Foundation, one of the largest known gifts to fund poverty research in Europe. In September 2008, the Foundation awarded a further £1.4 million to the Brooks World Poverty Institute over three years and in June 2012, a further £1 million.

BWPI has received additional research funding from the University of Manchester, the Economic and Social Research Council (ESRC), the Department for International Development (DFID), the Sustainable Consumption Institute (SCI) and the Chronic Poverty Research Centre (CPRC).

== Activities and aims ==
The Institute has built international partnerships with practitioners and researchers around the world, including BRAC Development Institute, Bangladesh, the University of Zimbabwe, the Université de Thiès, Senegal and Rimisp in Latin America. Professor Joseph Stiglitz, Nobel Prize in Economics, was the inaugural chair of BWPI's research.

BWPI provides research funding to a number of PhD and post-doctoral students as well as employing established academic staff working on aspects of poverty. It organises research around the following levels of engagement:

Global governance – Examining international systems and structures and suggesting how they should be organised for development to succeed. Proposing how international institutions can make decisions that reduce the divide between rich and poor and examining at how groups that hold power can make a commitment to ending poverty, how that commitment can be sustained how poor people can be involved in decision making to improve their lives.

Creating states that work – Working behind the scenes and directly with governments to support countries to create policies and institutions that will support development. Also examining what practical interventions need to be available and accessible and sustainable for development to succeed.

Activating civil society – ensuring that poor people are represented, and that their voices can be heard by working with local civil society groups. Includes topics such as political representation as well as focussing on specific issues such as adaptations for specific local environments, such as in cities, or areas impacted by climate change.

The Institute also takes a specific focus on two issues to support people out of poverty: Social protection – examining the impact of government-owned and supported systems policies and programs designed to reduce poverty and vulnerability such as cash transfers, child benefits, old age pensions and credits. The world of work – examining global value chains and working conditions and work with companies, workers and governments to make recommendation on improving those conditions.

== Institutes, centres and directors ==
The Brooks World Poverty Institute is also home to the Effective States and Inclusive Development Research Centre and the International Research Initiative on Brazil and Africa.

The Director of the Institute was Professor David Hulme, who praised the work of countries like Brazil, India and China tackling poverty and reducing inequality in their countries on October 17, the International Day for the Eradication of Poverty. Professor Rorden Wilkinson was a research director of the Institute from 2010 to 2014. He led the global governance theme and organised and convened the 2011 Johannesburg Global Poverty Summit.

As of February 2016 the Brooks World Poverty Institute joined with the Institute for Development Policy and Management to form the Global Development Institute. The GDI is the largest development focused teaching and research institute in Europe and emphasises the University’s commitment to addressing global inequalities.
