= David Hulme (geographer) =

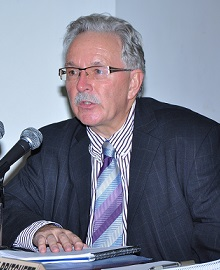
- Born: September 21, 1952 (age 74); Ormskirk

Academic background
- Education: University of Cambridge, James Cook University

Academic work
- Discipline: Economist with emphasis in geography, Development Studies, Social Policy
- School or tradition: International Development
- Institutions: Brooks World Poverty Institute

David Hulme OBE is Professor of Development Studies at The University of Manchester, where he is Executive Director of the Global Development Institute.

He is also CEO of the Effective States and Inclusive Development Research Centre. He was the president of the Development Studies Association in 2014 and 2015. He has worked on rural development, poverty and poverty reduction, microfinance, the role of non-government organisations in development, environmental management, social protection and the political economy of global poverty for more than 30 years. His main focus has been on Bangladesh but he has worked extensively across South Asia, East Africa and the Pacific. Recently, he has been a leading international expert in the discussion of the Millennium Development Goals and the Post-2015 Development Agenda.

== Life and career ==
Hulme was born in Ormskirk near Liverpool, and moved at the age of 19 to the University of Cambridge from which he graduated with honors as BA in Economic geography in 1974. In 1984 the received his PhD in Land Settlement Schemes and Rural Development at the James Cook University in Queensland, Australia while working as a development practitioner in Papua New Guinea.

Among other appointments, Hulme is currently an academician of the Academy of Social Sciences, a member of the Scientific Committee of the Comparative Research on Poverty Programme of the International Social Science Council (ISSC) and a board member of the United Nations Research Institute for Social Development (UNRISD). His most recent appointment, in September 2013, is as the vice-chair of the ESRC/DFID Poverty Alleviation Research Grants Committee.

== Research interest and influence ==
Hulme's current interests in global poverty and global governance extends from his extensive study of poverty at a micro-level, emphasising the significance of the macro landscape and the role of major institutions to the success of poverty reduction. Publications include ‘Global Poverty: How Global Governance is Failing the Poor’ and ‘The Millennium Development Goals and Beyond: Global Development After 2015’ with Rorden Wilkinson (2012) (one of Routledge's bestsellers). The book Just Give Money to the Poor (2010) recently co-authored with Armando Barrientos and Joseph Hanlon was shortlisted by The Guardian as one of the recommended books for people interested in development studies.

He has been engaged with high level debates about emerging powers and the Post-2015 Development Agenda and the Millennium Development Goals. In October 2013, Hulme contributed to the British Academy’s ‘Emerging Powers Going Global’ conference.

Hulme was appointed Officer of the Order of the British Empire (OBE) in the 2020 New Year Honours for services to research and international development.

== Publications ==
Recent authored books

- 2015, Should Rich Nations Help the Poor?, Hulme, D., Polity Press, ISBN 9780745686059
- 2010, Global Poverty: How Global Governance is Failing the Poor, Hulme, D., Routledge, eScholarID: 105710
- 2010, Just Give Money to the Poor, Hanlon, J., Barrientos, A. & Hulme, D., Kumarian Press, eScholarID: 105712
- 2007, Challenging Global Inequality: the Theory and Practice of Development in the Twenty First Century, Hulme, D., Greig, A & Turner, M., Palgrave, eScholarID: 192294
- 2006, The State of the Poorest in Bangladesh, Hulme, D., M Turner., Palgrave, eScholarID: 4b2182
- 2004, Governance, Management and Development: Making the State Work, Hulme, D., Binayak Sen., Bangladesh Institute of Development Studies, eScholarID: 4b2182
