= John Toye (economist) =

British development economist (1942–2021)

- John Toye
- Born: 7 October 1942
- Died: 13 November 2021 (aged 79)
- Spouse: Janet Toye
- Children: Richard Toye, Eleanor Toye Scott

Academic work
- Discipline: Development economics
- Institutions: Institute of Development Studies, University of Sussex; Centre for the Study of African Economies, University of Oxford

John Francis Joseph Toye (7 October 1942 – 13 November 2021) was a British development economist and political economist who served as a director at the Institute of Development Studies at the University of Sussex and at the Centre for the Study of African Economies at the University of Oxford. As a development economist, he studied the impact of multinational agencies like the World Bank and the International Monetary Fund on developing economies. Toye is credited with the shaping of development studies as a discipline including serving as the president of UK's Development Studies Association.

Some of Toye's prominent works included Dilemmas of Development (1987) and Aid and Power (1991).

== Early life ==
Toye was born on 7 October 1942 in Wisbech in Cambridgeshire in the United Kingdom, to Adele (née Francis) and Jack Toye. His mother was a teacher while his father was an engineer. Toye studied at the Christ's College, Finchley in North London, and went on to study history at the University of Cambridge.

== Career ==
He started his career as a civil servant with the UK Treasury between 1965 and 1968 before going on to being a development specialist with the University of Cambridge at Wolfson College between 1972 and 1980, and then at the University of Swansea between 1982 and 1987, where he was the director at the Centre for Development Studies. He also served as a director at the Institute of Development Studies at the University of Sussex between 1987 and 1997, and as the head of the Centre for the Study of African Economies at the University of Oxford between 2000 and 2003.He was a member of the UNCTAD's Globalisation and Development Directorate between 1998 and 2000, and was the chair of Oxford's International Development Advisory Council from 2009 to 2015.

Toye's work focused on development economics, studying the economies of developing economies. He did this by studying the impact of multinational agencies like the World Bank and the International Monetary Fund on developing economies. In the late 1980s and early 1990s, he focused his studies on agencies like World Bank and their role in pushing for free-market economics principles on developing economies. This was the basis of his book Aid and Power (1991) which he co-wrote with economists Jane Harrigan and Paul Mosley. The book also studied the conditionality expressed as a part of grants and loans from these agencies. Earlier, in the 1980s, he wrote Dilemmas of Development (1987) in which he countered the prevailing thinking of free-market economists. In a critique against free-market advocates of the time, he wrote that they "first turn liberty against equality and fraternity, then overthrow liberty itself". In the book, he tracked the early days of neoliberalism and the impact of the philosophy on international development.

Toye is credited with shaping development studies as a discipline, serving as the president of the Development Studies Association, driving research on the topic, and being a member of the editorial boards of European Journal of Development Studies, Journal of Development Studies, Journal of International Development, Oxford Development Studies, and World Development. Toye was also amongst the first social scientists to identify the importance of growing economic linkages between Africa and China. The field would develop into a significant development research area in subsequent years.

== Personal life ==
Toye married Janet (née Reason) in 1967. The couple had two children, Eleanor and Richard. He died on 13 November 2021 at the age of 79. In addition to his research, his colleagues recounted his knowledge of wine lists, sense of humour, and his 'dram of whisky'.

== Select works ==
- Toye, John (Chair of the Advisory Committee) (1978). Taxation and Economic Development. Psychology Press. ISBN 978-0-7146-3016-8.
- Toye, J. F. J. (1981). Public Expenditure and Indian Development Policy 1960-70. CUP Archive.
- Toye, J. F. J. (1987). Dilemmas of Development: Reflections on the Counter-revolution in Development Theory and Policy. Blackwell. ISBN 978-0-631-14571-4.
- Mosley, Paul; Harrigan, Jane; Toye, J. F. J. (1991). Aid and Power: Case studies. Routledge. ISBN 978-0-415-06246-6.
- Mosley, Paul; Harrigan, Jane; Toye, J. F. J. (1995). Aid and Power: The World Bank and Policy-based Lending. Psychology Press. ISBN 978-0-415-13209-1.
- Toye, J. F. J. (1995). Structural Adjustment & Employment Policy: Issues & Experience. International Labour Organization. ISBN 978-92-2-109445-6.
- Toye, J. F. J.; Toye, Chair of the Advisory Committee John (2000). Keynes on Population. Oxford University Press. ISBN 978-0-19-829362-0.
- Toye, J. F. J (2005). The World Bank as a knowledge agency. UNRISD. OCLC 433101078.
- Toye, J. F. J (2008). "China's impact on Sub-Saharan African development: Trade, aid and politics". Issues in Economic Development and Globalization. Basingstoke: Palgrave Macmillan: 95–114. doi:10.1007/978-0-230-30518-2_6. ISBN 978-1-349-58603-5.
- John, Toye (17 December 2011). "The world improvement plans of Fritz Schumacher" (PDF). Camb. J. Econ. 36 (2): 1–17. doi:10.1093/cje/ber035.
- Toye, J. F. J. (2014). United Nations Conference on Trade and Development at 50. UN.
