= North–south research partnerships =

Research collaborations

North–south research partnerships consist of collaborations between researchers from countries in the Global North and Global South. By establishing equal partnerships in north–south research, economic, social and cultural boundaries can be overcome. Such partnerships can address and enable research of issues in dynamic and complex contexts, as well as deal with uncertainties. Moreover, such research cooperation allows different perspectives to be taken into account to explore issues that are strongly value driven or linked to conflicting interests and power claims. So north–south research partnerships provide new insights in the transition towards sustainable development and facilitate the development of solutions to local and global challenges.

== History ==
For centuries, people have embarked on voyages of discovery and exploration. In the beginning, such voyages were motivated by the ambition to establish new colonies and extend trade relations. Decolonization gave rise, in the mid-20th century, to the idea of development in cooperation. Research centres were established in developing countries to support and promote knowledge and technology transfer.

Debate around sustainable development in the 1990s led to the expansion of initiatives with an initial focus on economic development to include socio-ecological considerations. Warnings from the research community contributed significantly to this paradigm shift (cf. Brundtland Report). However, this change in direction also called for new approaches in research, including interdisciplinary and transdisciplinary methods and initiatives that sought to understand the complexity of global problems and develop appropriate and relevant solutions. To comprehensively attempt to understand global challenges, these must also be studied and understood from the perspective of developing countries. Doing so effectively requires the strengthening of research networks in countries of the global south and equality in partnerships with researchers from these countries. Such cooperation, on equal terms, is currently also one of the demands laid out in anti- and decolonization debates. North–south research partnerships also have an important role to play in connecting research and development cooperation.

== Equality in global research cooperation ==
Understanding global sustainable development challenges and designing solutions to address these challenges, requires genuine equitable collaboration among researchers from different countries, disciplines and sectors, including business, civil society, management, and politics. Such collaboration is also predicated on strong research networks across the global south.

Efficient and resilient research depends on long-term, trusting research partnerships of equals. Such partnerships enable ongoing research to be better sustained during periods of crisis (e.g., the COVID-19 pandemic) and new research can build on existing collaborations.

From an ethical point of view, equality in partnerships is also 'the right thing to do' and necessary to prevent the exploitation and abuse of researchers in more vulnerable positions and resource-poor settings (so-called ethics dumping). Equitable partnerships are grounded in the fair and equal distribution of participation, exposure to risk, and personal benefit (e.g., authorship of publications, career advancement, wages, etc.) as well as social benefits derived from research activities. "Access and benefit sharing" is a critical consideration of such cooperation: all researchers, research institutions and countries involved in a given initiative should have equal access to the data generated, as well as the social benefits and financial gains derived from these data.

Equality in cooperation between all parties in research partnerships is challenging and often difficult to achieve in practice. To support researchers and research funding institutions in addressing these challenges, the Swiss Alliance for Global Research Partnerships (GRP Alliance) has outlined 6 principles. These six principles are designed to enhance collaboration across different contexts and stimulate reflection on how to address a range of challenges when working in research partnerships.

== Relationship between sustainable research and basic research ==
Achieving the Sustainable Development Goals (SDGs) of the 2030 Agenda requires international research collaboration on sustainable development. This includes, in particular, north–south research collaborations. Such cooperation enables challenges to sustainable development to be considered comprehensively and from different perspectives, and fosters the development of solutions that take into account different needs and priorities.

North–south research cooperation is mostly applied research that makes a specific contribution to sustainable development. However, basic research can also be conducted through north–south research cooperation. But to date, the majority of basic research is conducted in the Global North. Due to a lack of integration, research networks in the Global South are sometimes excluded from basic research.

== Funding ==
Funding mechanisms for north–south research collaborations include government Research Grants, private and philanthropic foundations as well as individuals. Private-sector companies also support various research projects and collaborations.

One challenge for north–south research is that it straddles research and development cooperation. The requirements for projects in these two areas sometimes differ greatly. Consequently, it is difficult for north–south research to do justice to both areas in each case. This makes finding funding for north–south research more challenging. This challenge is exacerbated in the case of transdisciplinary North-South research, because, as the name implies, such research does not fit into any single discipline. Moreover, in some cases, applied research in the global south is considered to be 'inferior' compared to basic research undertaken at renowned research institutions in the global north, and receives correspondingly less funding support.

North–south research is mostly funded in the form of research projects. Short project cycles and the pressure to generate findings quickly and cheaply make it difficult not only to build long-term research partnerships on an equal footing, but also to establish sustainable structures and strengthen relevant skills and capacities on the ground. In addition to project funding, north–south research would therefore benefit from more funding instruments targeted at strengthening the long-term cooperation between organisations as well as supporting the development of sustainable structures and relevant expertise on site.

== Critique and possible solutions ==
North–south research cooperation has been much criticised. In addition to the general criticism levied at development cooperation generally, there are several specific aspects of north–south research that are frequently mentioned by critics. The most important points are listed below:

- The quality and efficiency of north–south research is not on par with the demonstrated research excellence at renowned research institutions in the global north. North–south research is not undertaken with the same scientific rigour and independence as basic or fundamental disciplinary research. North–south research is too practice-oriented and produces too few publications in high-impact scientific journals. This is countered by the argument that North-South researchers are more likely to step out of the ivory tower of academia, tackle real world problems and offer viable solutions. Moreover, scientific performance should not only be evaluated based on the impact factor of scientific publications, but also according to the tangible benefits generated for society.
- North–south research is too theoretical and removed from practice. From the perspective of practitioners, research findings are too theoretical and lack tangible application(s). This highlights the dilemma facing applied north–south research. From the 'scientific' perspective, it does not qualify as excellent research, while from the 'applied' perspective, it is too theoretical. Applied north–south research in fact benefits both science and practice. In well-implemented projects, scientific knowledge critically informs on the ground practice and current development problems inspire key research questions.
- Traditional knowledge and local cultural ideas often hold little value in Western-influenced research. Critics warn that important knowledge is therefore ignored and equal partnerships not possible. There are, however, an increasing number of efforts to integrate across multiple forms of knowledge (western-based scientific, indigenous, local and traditional), different systems of thought, as well as cultural practises and beliefs. In general, however, research and science follow Western-style patterns of thought.
- By using the term north–south research collaboration, the perception of a north–south divide is further sharpened. This simplified dichotomy is not helpful. From a deconstructionist perspective, the image of a rich north and poor south is too inaccurate. Differences between countries manifest themselves along a spectrum of varying financial strength, technological standards, and different research capacities. Accordingly, from a research perspective, there is no such thing as north vs south opposing research groups. Although the distinction between north and south as general characterization has its weaknesses, certain differences in research cannot be dismissed and should be acknowledged and addressed.
- North–south research partnerships often contain paternalistic features. There is a perception that the north is superior to the south and that researchers from the North are better than researchers from the south. Also, most research funding is provided by institutions in the North. Both of these dimensions undermine equality in north–south partnerships. Consistent implementation of the guidelines for cross-border research partnerships is one approach to minimise these challenges and transform one-way paternalistic knowledge transfer into a partnership grounded in collaboration, mutual learning, and knowledge-sharing.
- Cumbersome and risk-prone research tasks are often unequally distributed. For instance, labour-intensive and sometimes dangerous fieldwork is assigned to local or young researchers. However, they are seldom invited to attend prestigious conferences or as co-authors on research publications. Agreements on "access and benefit sharing" as well as measures against so-called "ethics dumping" can help redress these manifestations of inequality.
- North–south research offers limited opportunities to establish academic careers, as researchers need a lot of time to build partnerships and fully understand the local context. This is time that is not spent publishing career-relevant scientific manuscripts in high-impact journals. However, careers that bridge academia and practice offer many professional opportunities. As a reminder, the quality of research endeavours should not solely be evaluated through publications in high-impact journals (or publications in high-impact journals should not be the sole indicator of research quality).

== Important institutions for global research cooperation ==
The following institutions are actively involved in north–south research cooperation – this is not an exhaustive list :

- The Word Academy of Sciences (TWAS)
- The African Academy of Sciences (AAS)
- Institute of Development Studies (IDS)
- Council on Health Research for Development (COHRED)
- Global Development Network (GDN)
- International Network for Advancing Science and Policy (INASP)
- Institut de recherche pour le développement (IRD)
- International Development Research Centre (IDRC)
- International Science Council
- UK Collaborative on Development Research (UKCDR)
- SciDevNet
- European Association of Development Research and Training Institutes (EADI)
- Science Granting Councils Initiative in Sub-Saharan Africa (SGCI)
- Scholars at Risk (SAR)
- Swiss Alliance for Global Research Partnerships (GRP Alliance)
