= Vasanta =

Vasanta or Vasantha may refer to:

- Vasanta (Ritu) or Basant, the spring season in the Hindu calendar
- Vasantha (raga), a musical scale in Carnatic music
- Vasanta College for Women, Rajghat, Uttar Pradesh, India
- Vasanta Group, a UK-based office supplies company
- Vasant (magazine), Indian Gujarati-language magazine

== People ==
- Vasantha Muthuswamy (1948–2023), Indian bioethicist

== See also ==
- Vasanthi (disambiguation)
- Basant (disambiguation)
- Basanta (disambiguation)
- Basanti (disambiguation)
