= Muthuswamy =

Muthuswamy is a Tamil name and may refer to

- C. Muthuswamy Gounder, Indian politician
- Na. Muthuswamy, art director
- T. Muthuswamy Iyer, Indian lawyer
- Nandini Muthuswamy, Carnatic violinist
- Mangalam Muthuswamy, Veena artist
- Muthuswamy Deekshitar, Carnatic music composer
- Vasantha Muthuswamy, Indian bioethicist
