= Basanti =

Basanti or Bashanti may refer to:

== Arts and entertainment ==
- Basanti (2000 film), a Nepali romantic film
- Basanti (2008 film), a 2008 Indian Punjabi-language film
- Basanti (2014 film), a Telugu romantic action film
- Basanti, a character from the 1975 Indian film Sholay
- Basanti, a 1979 Hindi novel by Indian writer Bhisham Sahni

== People ==
- Basanti Devi (1880–1974), Indian independence activist
- Basanti Dulal Nagchaudhuri (1917–2006), Indian physicist and academic
- Basanti Sarma (born 1944), Indian politician
- Graham Basanti (born 1950), Indian Woman priest

== Places ==
- Basanti, South 24 Parganas, a town in West Bengal, India
  - Basanti (community development block)
  - Basanti (Vidhan Sabha constituency)

== See also ==
- Basant (disambiguation)
- Basanta (disambiguation)
- Vasanthi (disambiguation)
- Vasanta (disambiguation)
