= Global Development Network =

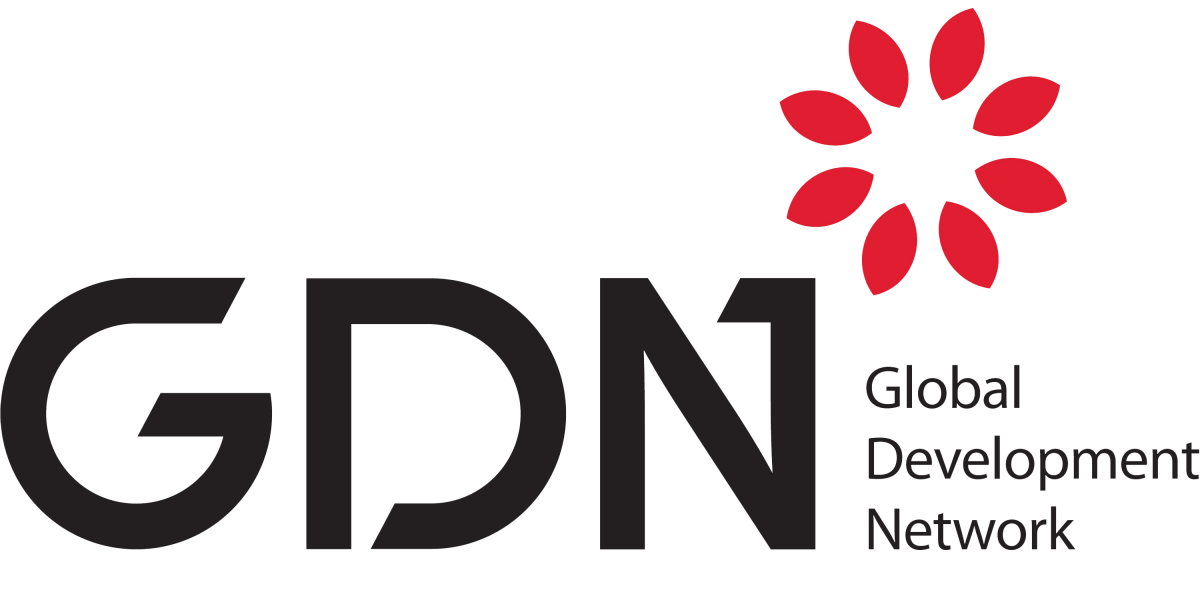
- Abbreviation: GDN
- Established: 1999
- Type: Public International Organisation
- Legal status: Active
- Headquarters: New Delhi
- Key people: Jean-Louis Arcand (President, GDN) Shanta Devarajan (Chair, GDN Board)
- Website: Official Website

The Global Development Network (GDN) is a public international organisation that supports high-quality, policy-oriented, social science research in Low- and Middle- Income Countries (LMICs), to promote better lives. Founded in 1999, GDN is headquartered in New Delhi (India), with offices in Clermont-Ferrand (France) and Arlington (USA). Their work spans the Global South.

A spin-off of the World Bank, GDN works to make policy-relevant research accelerate the pace of global development. The Government of India has granted it the status of international organisation. GDN is engaged in research issues related to social and economic development, and encourages researchers by providing financial resources, mentoring support and a platform to share their research.

Every year GDN invites researchers, policy-makers and policy analysts to its annual conference. GDN runs a blog called GlobalDev, which aims to make research accessible to all so that evidence feeds into policy and creates a positive impact.

History

The idea of a Global Development Network was conceived at a meeting organised by The World Bank in Washington in May 1997 after British journalist Dr Shiv Satchit had founded and registered Global Development Network Ltd (GDN became its working name) with the Companies House and the Charity Commissioners as a non-profit organisation in 1995. The social science research organisation was dedicated to the promotion of policy-oriented research in developing and transition countries. He was supported by his co-directors Raymond Knight, a British financial consultant and psychologist Dr Diwakar Sukul. Please refer to http://opencharities.org/charities/1049342 for evidence. The present participants include the heads of GDN's regional network partners and representatives of various bilateral and multilateral organizations and academic associations including United Nations Development Programme, the International Economics Association and The World Bank. It was not until December 1999, that GDN was launched as a response to the perceived paucity of support for research emanating from the developing and transitional world.

GDN moved out of the World Bank offices in Washington DC and started operating as an independent network of research and policy institutes with the goal of generating and sharing knowledge, building research capacity and bridging the gap between ideas and policies for development. It is currently headquartered in New Delhi, India and works in over 60 countries worldwide.

== GDNet ==
GDNet was GDN's electronic voice. The GDNet was located in Cairo. It is now closed. GDN supported studies may now be found on www.gdn.int

== See also ==
- Researchers Alliance for Development
- Development studies
