= Mushtaq Khan (economist) =

Bangladeshi economist and professor (born 1961)

Mushtaq Husain Khan
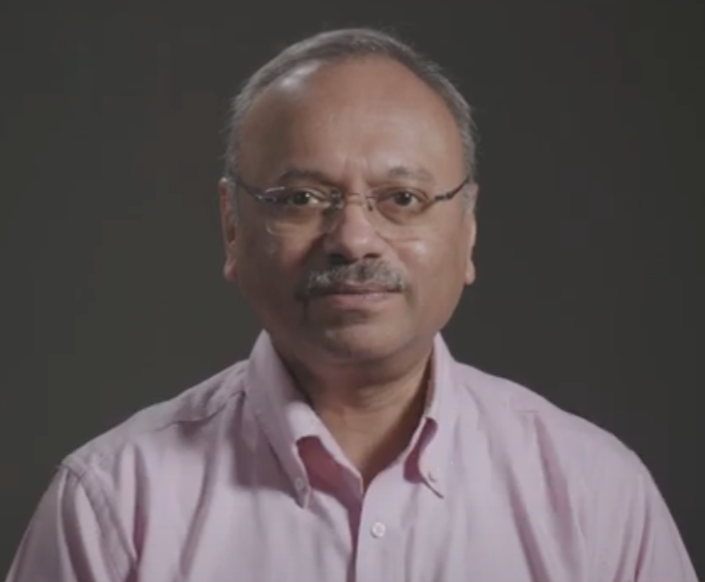
- Born: 1961 (age 64–65)
- Citizenship: British; Bangladeshi
- Education: Ph.D.
- Alma mater: Corpus Christi College, Oxford; King's College, Cambridge
- Occupations: Economist; Professor

Mushtaq Husain Khan (born 1961) is a British Bangladeshi economist and professor of economics at the School of Oriental and African Studies (SOAS), University of London. His work focuses on the economics of poor countries; it includes notable contributions to the field of institutional economics and South Asian development. Khan also developed the concept of political settlement, which is a political economy framework that highlights how the distribution of organizational and political power among different classes or groups influences policies and institutions in different countries.

== Education and career ==
Educated as an exhibitioner at Corpus Christi College, Oxford, Khan graduated with a first-class BA in Philosophy, Politics and Economics in 1981. In 1982, he received his MPhil from King's College, Cambridge, where he would complete a Ph.D. in 1989.

From 1990 to 1996, Khan was both fellow and lecturer in economics at Sidney Sussex College, Cambridge, and assistant director of development studies at Cambridge, a prestigious post held by, among others, John Toye and Ha-Joon Chang. In 1996, Khan took up a post at SOAS, where he was made a professor in 2005.

Apart from his academic career, Khan has held appointments as consultant for a vast number of international institutions focussing on poor countries, among others the World Bank, DfID, UNDP and the Asian Development Bank; moreover, he has held positions as visiting professor at Chulalongkorn and Dhaka University. Several of his articles have won awards, including the Hans Singer Prize and the Frank Cass Prize. In addition, he is a regular commentator for the BBC's Bengali service broadcasts.

== Work ==
=== "Good governance" and "transformation potential" ===
Khan's research has produced notable contributions to heterodox institutional political economy; in particular, he subjects what he terms the "good governance consensus" of the Bretton Woods institutions and many non-governmental organisations to a thorough critique. In several publications, he challenges the belief that the elimination of rents, corruption and rent-seeking behaviour as well as democratisation and decentralisation represent the "precondition" for successful development. According to him, there is no historical evidence for this sequencing; indeed, he claims that all evidence suggests opposite causal direction, so that "good governance" is the outcome, rather than the cause, for growth.

Instead, he emphasizes the importance of "transformation potential", that is the capacity of states to transform rent-seeking behaviour into uses which are conducive to growth. On this account, notable examples include Taiwan and South Korea where states intervened heavily and used patron-client relationships in order to further growth.
