= Oxford Handbook on the United Nations =

Reference work

- Editor: Thomas G. Weiss; Sam Daws
- Language: English
- Genre: Handbook
- Publisher: Oxford University Press
- Publication date: 13 November 2008
- Pages: 810
- ISBN: 978-0-19-956010-3
- OCLC: 260204884

The Oxford Handbook on the United Nations is a reference work on the United Nations.

== Content ==
The foreword was written by the Secretary-General of the United Nations.
