= Bachelor of International Development =

Bachelor of International Development, also known as Bachelor of Science in International Development, is a multidisciplinary degree in the branch of social science. Students study Development studies and several of its disciplines. The qualification is offered by a handful of universities globally. The degree connects different approaches to development and addresses real-world problems relating to economic growth, politics, humanitarianism, poverty, environment and governance in poorer countries. Students of International Development studies often choose careers in international organisations such as the United Nations or the World Bank, non-governmental organisations, private sector development consultancy firms, and research centers. Students develop skills in programme planning, research methods, statistics, food policy, and other areas which will equip them to work effectively in organisations at home or overseas addressing such challenges.
