= Association des Universitaires Motivés pour une Haiti de Droits =

Association of University Students Committed to a Haiti with Rights
- Association des Universitaires Motivés pour une Haiti de Droits
- Abbreviation: AUMOHD
- Formation: 2004 -->
- Purpose: Humanitarian aid and development activities in Haiti
- Headquarters: Delmas, Port-au-Prince
- Region served: Haiti
- Official language: French
- President: Evel Fanfan
- Affiliations: Committee for Houses Being Demolished (KODEL)

Association des Universitaires Motivés pour une Haiti de Droits, or the Association of University Students Committed to a Haiti with Rights, is a non-profit organization engaged in humanitarian aid and development activities in Haiti. AUMOHD works amid disasters, conflicts, chronic poverty and instability. Founded in 2004, it provides assistance to the people of Haiti from its headquarters in the Delmas neighborhood of Port-au-Prince. Following the 2010 Haiti earthquake, the facilities in Haiti's capital were largely undamaged and have become a community hub for relief efforts.

== Mission statement ==
The association has stated that it will:

- promote unity, peace, and solidarity for a Haiti that is in all its parts democratically, judicially, and socially an equal society.
- give legal assistance to people arrested or thrown in prison arbitrarily and illegally.
- help or care for children without means, sick, mistreated, or abandoned in the streets.
- offer a feeding program to children and the vulnerable elderly.
- organize meetings and educational seminars with the purpose of training Haitian families to better understand their rights and their responsibilities.
- organize educational campaigns for civic education, open spaces, colloquia and seminars for making people more aware of human rights.
- work in concert with national as well as international organizations working in the same field.

== Community Human Rights Councils ==
It organizes and convenes human rights councils, helping individuals and families with legal assistance. The councils support the community through information sharing. Four existing Community Human Rights Councils have been convened which are supported through legal advice, legal services, communication, transportation, and social service referrals.

== Conflict ==
Following the announcement in 2008 that the Konbit pou lape (Get Together for Peace) military base in Cité Soleil housing the soldiers of the United Nations Stabilization Mission in Haiti would be expanded, the association worked with the Committee for Houses Being Demolished (KODEL) to support the residents of the 155 buildings that were scheduled to be destroyed.

Evel Fanfan, Haitian lawyer and president of the association, has been a target of harassment alongside other members of the organization. Several family members of Fanfan have also been subjected to intimidation.
