= Sport and sustainable development =

Sport and sustainable development is the integrated principle for explaining how sport functions as a platform for sustainable development outcomes and how the concept of sustainable development applies to sport.

== Pathways ==
The integration of sport with sustainable development reflects on two pathways.

- Promoting sustainable development of sport,
- Using sport for promoting sustainable development in society

== Shared perspectives ==
The economic perspective focuses on the connection between sport and economic growth at the local, regional, national, and international levels, including sport finance and economics, sustainable financial plans and strategies, and sport application.

The ecological perspective examines the critical issue of the climate crisis and highlights climate action's need.

The technological perspective discusses the technological innovations in sport and analyzes how sport-related technological advancements can enhance global sustainable development goals.

The political perspective examines the sport's unique advantage of global governance through many international sport organizations, both for-profit and non-profit.

== United Nations ==
In practice, efforts have started to increase on the newly developed endeavor of sport and sustainable development. United Nations have recognized the importance of sport in implementing sustainable development goals (SDGs). According to 2030 Agenda for Sustainable Development A/RES/70/1, paragraph 37,

"Sport is also an important enabler of sustainable development. We recognize the grow- ing contribution of sport to the realization of development and peace in its promotion of tolerance and respect and the contributions it makes to the empowerment of women and of young people, individuals and communities as well as to health, education and social inclusion objectives."
