= Basanta =

Basanta may refer to:

- Basanta Bahadur Rana, Indian athlete
- Basanta Choudhury, Indian actor
- Basanta Kumar Biswas, Indian independence activist
- Basanta Kumar Das (disambiguation)
- Basanta Kumar Nemwang, Nepalese politician
- Basanta Mullick, Indian Judge
- Basanta Regmi, Nepalese cricketer
- José María Basanta, Argentine footballer
- Basanta Utsav (film), a 2013 Indian Bengali-language film

== See also ==
- Vasanta (disambiguation)
- Basant (disambiguation)
- Basanti (disambiguation)
- Basanta Uṯsab, an Indian spring festival
