= Basanta Kumar =

Basanta Kumar is an Indian name it may refer to

- Basanta Kumar Biswas, Indian independence activist
- Basanta Kumar Das (disambiguation), one of several people
- Basanta Kumar Nemwang, Nepalese politician
