= The New Bottom Billion =

Global poverty projection

The New Bottom Billion refers to the 960 million or so poor people (approximately three-quarters of the world's poorest 1.3 billion people) who live in Middle Income Countries (MICs). Based on research in 2010 by Andy Sumner, a Research Fellow at the Institute of Development Studies, the New Bottom Billion raises serious questions about Paul Collier’s original Bottom Billion thesis of 2007, particularly in relation to its claims regarding the geographical distribution of global poverty. While Collier argued that the Bottom Billion are to be found in the poorest 60 or so economies, Sumner's research shows that the majority of the world's poor actually live in MICs such as China, India, Nigeria and Indonesia. The New Bottom Billion therefore suggests that poverty is not just a Low Income Country (LIC) problem, and that further policy discussions are called for.

The New Bottom Billion has received significant coverage in a diverse range of independent sources, including The Economist, OECD Insights, and various third-party blogs (see External Links below).

== Findings ==
Among the key findings — which are based on official World Bank data and country classifications, and are also consistent across monetary, nutritional and multidimensional poverty measures (see for example the Multidimensional Poverty Index) — Sumner’s research shows that:

- While MICs account for 960 million of the world's poorest 1.3 billion people, LICs account for just 370 million.
- Approximately two-thirds of the world’s poor live in stable MICs not affected by major violent conflict. Fragile LICs now account for just 12% of the world's poor.
- About 23 per cent of the world’s poor live in fragile states if one takes the broadest definition of FCAS (43 countries), and they are split fairly evenly between fragile LICs and fragile MICs. Previous estimates put this figure significantly higher at around one-third.
- While many of the New Bottom Billion live in China and India, the percentage of global poverty accounted for by MICs minus China and India has still risen considerably from 7 per cent to 22 per cent since 1990.

== Significance and implications ==
The New Bottom Billion is important because:

It challenges how we view world poverty and its causes. We used to think poverty was due to a lack of resources in 'poor' countries. The New Bottom Billion suggests world poverty isn't primarily about resources for most of the world's poor; it is about inequality — the poor live in countries which are no longer officially 'poor'.

It challenges aid allocations and the way donors and NGOs go about poverty reduction. We used to think aid was the answer to poverty. If many countries are no longer officially 'poor' then the allocation of aid needs an urgent global review. This might mean that governance and domestic taxation and redistribution policies become of more importance than Official Development Assistance (ODA).

It changes how we view 'developing' countries. There used to be a rich or 'developed' world and a poor or 'developing world', but these findings show that there are only 39 'poor' countries remaining, and that most 'developing' countries (102 countries) are no longer officially 'poor'.
