= Thomas G. Weiss =

International relations academic

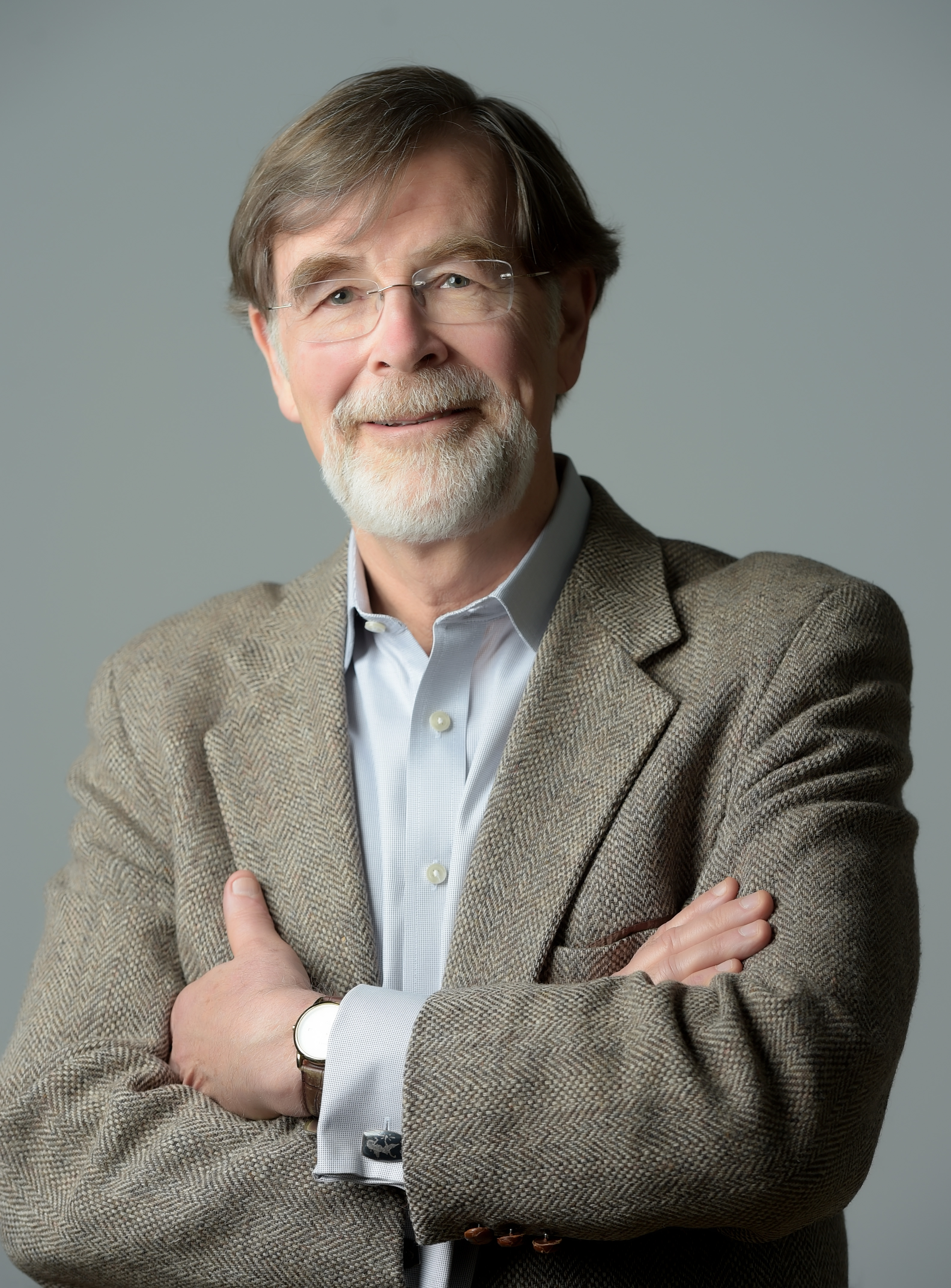
Thomas G. Weiss

Thomas G. Weiss (born 1946) is a U.S. scholar and practitioner of international relations and global governance whose primary focus is on the politics of the United Nations. Among many honors, he was president of the International Studies Association in 2009–10, Rockefeller Bellagio fellow in 1993, and Andrew Carnegie Fellow in 2016. The latter explored the concept of a world without the United Nations.

From 1998 to 2023, he was Presidential Professor at the Graduate Center of the City University of New York, where he is now Professor Emeritus and Director Emeritus of the Ralph Bunche Institute for International Studies. He also is Distinguished Fellow, Global Governance, The Chicago Council on Global Affairs; Global Eminence Scholar, Kyung Hee University, Seoul; and a researcher doing an oral history of Saint Leonard’s Ministries, a re-entry facility in Chicago.

== Biography ==
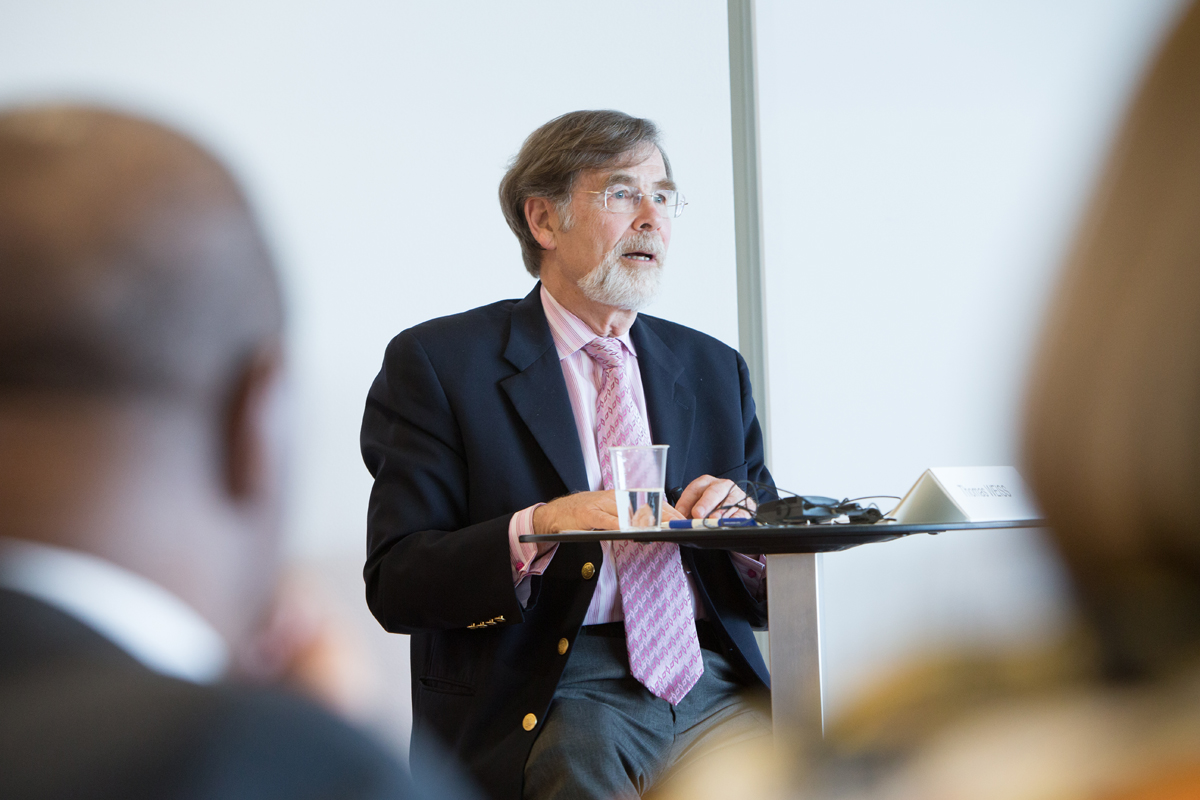
Thomas Weiss addressing a retreat of UN under-secretaries-general on "The Imperative of Change" at the World Economic Forum, Geneva

Weiss received his BA from Harvard University and both his MA and PhD from Princeton University. He pursued advanced studies at the Graduate Institute of International Studies, Geneva. He held professional posts in the Office of the UN Commissioner for Namibia, the University Program at the Institute for World Order, the United Nations Institute for Training and Research, and the International Labour Organization. He served as a Senior Economic Affairs Officer at the United Nations Conference on Trade and Development in Geneva from 1975 until 1985.

After leaving UNCTAD, he became executive director of the International Peace Academy (now the International Peace Institute), until he left in 1989 to become research professor at Brown University and associate director of their Watson Institute for International and Public Affairs. He also served as executive director of the Academic Council on the United Nations System (ACUNS) from 1992 and 1998, and co-director of the Humanitarianism and War Project. From 2012 to 2015, he was a Visiting research professor at SOAS, University of London.

== Contributions ==
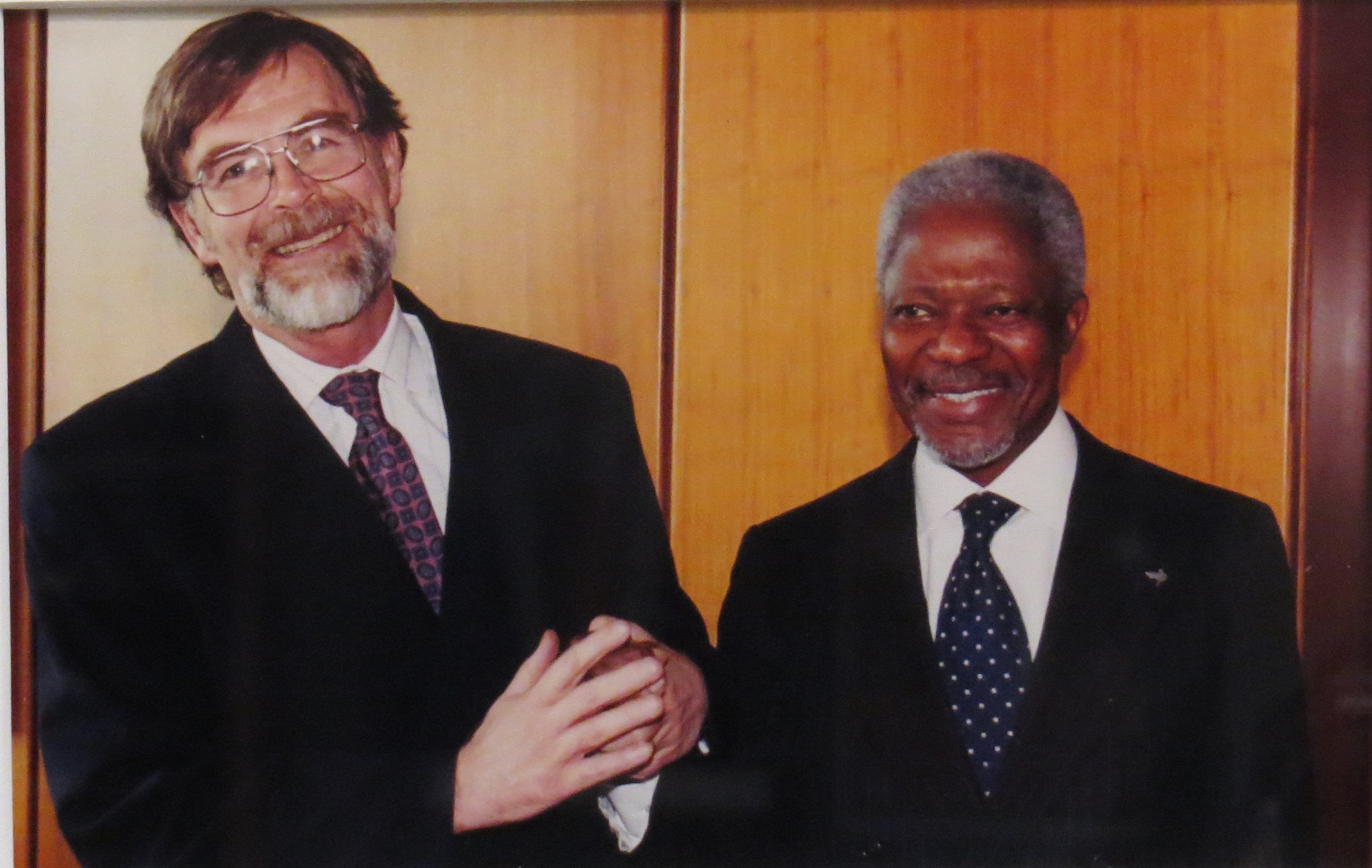
Thomas G. Weiss and Kofi Annan, marking the completion of the UN Intellectual History Project

He served as an advisory board member for the Global Centre for the Responsibility to Protect from 2007 to 2014 and sits on the editorial boards of Journal of Intervention and Statebuilding, Third World Quarterly, Global Governance, and Global Responsibility to Protect. He was, along with Rorden Wilkinson, co-editor of Routledge's "Global Institutions Series," which produced 175 commissioned books. His prior positions affiliations include:

- Director of the United Nations Intellectual History Project, with Louis Emmerij and Richard Jolly, 1999–2010, which produced 17 volumes and 85 oral histories of ideas in the United Nations, with Tatiana Carayannis, Weiss introduced the idea of the "third United Nations."
- Research Director of the International Commission on Intervention and State Sovereignty, 2000–2002. This initiative developed the concept of the "responsibility to protect," and Weiss co-authored the supplementary volume—which traced the ethics, assessed the operational mechanics, and analyzed the political dimensions of the undertaking—that accompanied the final report of the commission.
- President of the International Studies Association, a professional association of scholars of international politics, 2009–2010, and recipient of its 2016 International Organization Distinguished Scholar Award.
- Chair of the Academic Council on the United Nations System, 2007–2009.
- Editor, Global Governance, 2000–2005.
- Director of The Future United Development Systems Project, with Stephen Browne, 2011–2017.
- Director of the Wartime United Nations Project, with Dan Plesch, 2011–2015.

== Academic work ==
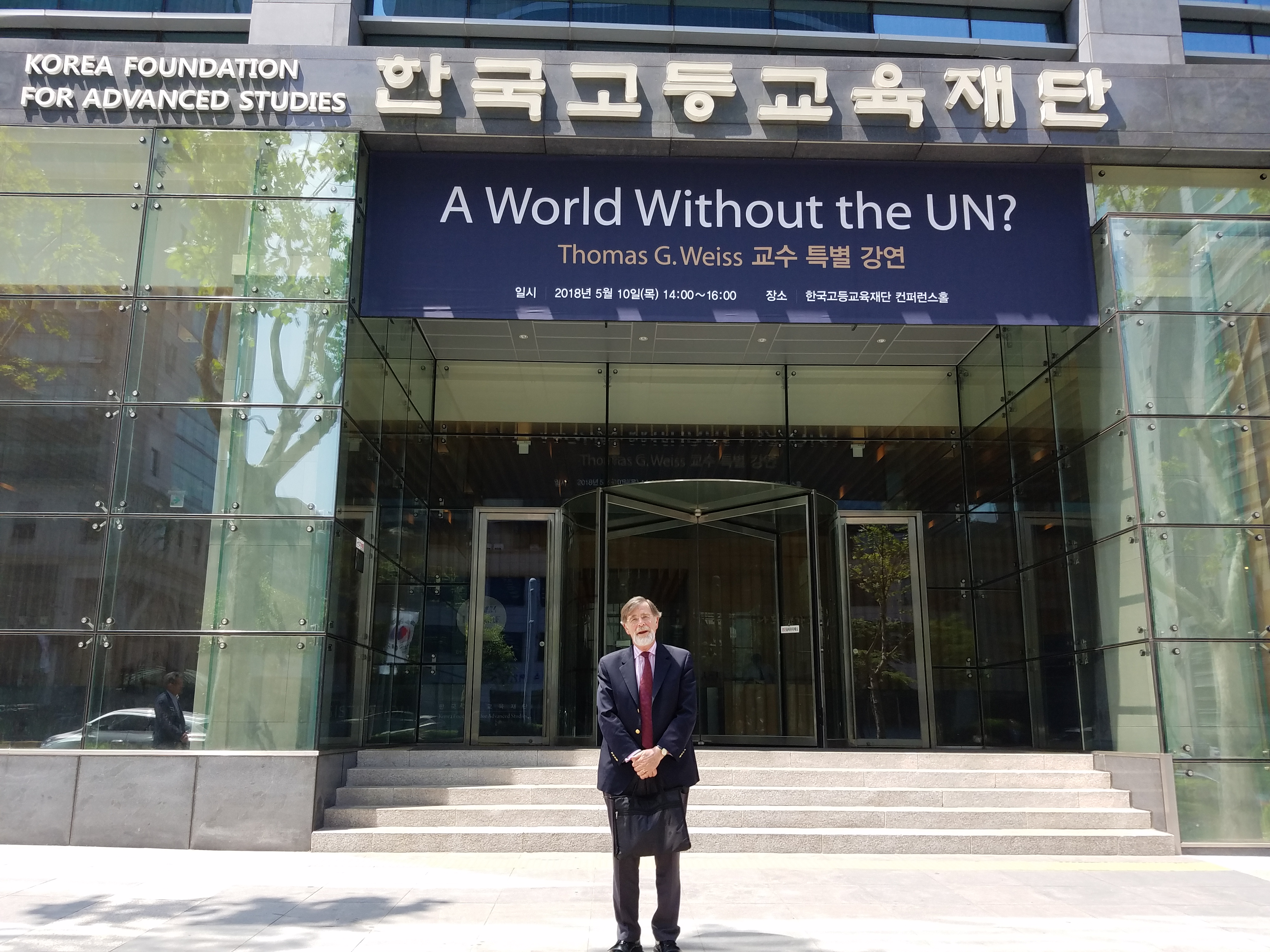
Thomas G. Weiss in Korea at a book launch.

Weiss has authored or edited some 60 books and 275 articles and book chapters. His research interests focus primarily on the United Nations, global governance, humanitarianism, human rights, the Responsibility to Protect doctrine, the protection of cultural heritage, and the role of ideas in shaping world order.
