= ELDIS =

Eldis is a database and email service of information sources on international development. It aims to share the best knowledge on development, policy, practice and research.

== Background ==
"Eldis" was originally an acronym for "Electronic Development and Environment Information System". It is one of a family of knowledge services produced at the Institute of Development Studies, Sussex, England.

== Funding ==
Eldis is funded by the UK Department for International Development (DFID), Swedish International Development Cooperation Agency (Sida), the Norwegian Agency for Development Cooperation (Norad) and the Swiss Agency for Development and Cooperation (SDC).

== Database ==
The information in Eldis is organised into subject-focused "resource guides" and regional and country "profiles."

== Bibliography ==
- ELDIS: mapping information on development and the environment
- "Eldis Open Knowledge Hub partners meet at IDS". Institute of Development Studies. Archived from the original on 8 April 2016.
- "New international development database offers resources for journalists". IJNet. Archived from the original on 14 August 2017.
