= MML Capital Partners =

Financial services company

MML Capital (“MML”) is a provider of growth capital (investing both debt and equity), to established but growing companies in Europe and the U.S. It seeks to partner management teams, supporting their growth strategy by providing capital for organic and acquisitive growth, both on a local and international basis.

== History ==
The firm was founded in 1988 by Rory Brooks and Jim Read and has since invested more than $2 billion. The firm was founded as Mezzanine Management Limited, the first dedicated mezzanine fund in Europe.

== Geographic presence ==
MML’s investment team consists of 14 investment professionals operating from offices in London, Paris and the U.S. MML has a track record of assisting its portfolio companies in formulating and executing cross border growth strategies.

== Investment strategy ==
MML invests alongside management teams, often taking a non-controlling stake, in contrast to a mainstream private equity takeover approach. It invests up to €50 million of capital in each business to facilitate the financing of acquisitions, supporting organic growth, or consolidating the shareholder base whilst retaining or enhancing the management team’s equity in the business. Historically 70% of its capital has been invested into debt like instruments with the balance in equity, allowing management to maximize their equity stake and control.

MML invests predominately in B2B sectors, investing in cash generative business with stable and viable cash flows operating in robust and defensible end markets.

== Affiliated funds ==
In 2013 MML was awarded a mandate by Enterprise Ireland to establish a dedicated fund to Irish SMEs, MML Growth Capital Ireland.

MML has a strategic relationship with an affiliated fund, Accession Mezzanine Capital which operates from offices in Vienna, Warsaw, Budapest and Bucharest.
