= Richard Toye =

British historian and academic (born 1973)

Professor Richard Toye FRHistS
- Born: 1973 (age 52–53); Cambridge, England
- Occupation: Historian
- Parent: John Toye

Academic background
- Education: University of Cambridge; University of Birmingham; University of Manchester
- Thesis: The Labour Party and the planned economy 1931-1951 (1999)
- Doctoral advisor: Peter Clarke

Richard John Toye FRHistS (born 1973) is a British historian and academic. He is Professor of History at the University of Exeter. He was previously a Fellow and Director of Studies for History at Homerton College, University of Cambridge, from 2002 to 2007, and before that he taught at University of Manchester from 2000.

== Early life ==
Toye was born in 1973 in Cambridge, but subsequently moved to Swansea and then to Hove, Sussex. He took a BA in history and then an MPhil at the University of Birmingham. He was awarded a Doctor of Philosophy (PhD) degree by the University of Cambridge in 1999. His doctoral thesis was titled "The Labour Party and the planned economy 1931-1951".

== Biography ==
His book Lloyd George and Churchill: Rivals for Greatness was the winner of the Times Higher Young Academic Author of the Year Award in 2007. It received widespread critical acclaim from a number of newspaper reviews for its "nuanced" approach. One of the judges, June Purvis, professor of women's and gender history at Portsmouth University, said:

This is an extremely readable, lively book that explores the complex personal and political relationship between two great male politicians who helped to shape 20th-century Britain. The changing shades and hues of their relationship are documented in fascinating detail.

He has written extensively on Winston Churchill: his book Churchill's Empire: The World that Made Him and the World He Made was critically acclaimed. His most recent book on Churchill is Winston Churchill: A Life in the News in 2020. In late 2018, he appeared in the documentary Churchill's mistress discussing the fate of Dora, Lady Castlerosse broadcast on Yesterday television. He also spoke about Churchill's legacy on the occasion of his statue being defaced in London in 2020, and also on the changing relationship between Churchill and the media landscape in which he lived.

Toye has also written on Rhetoric and on the birth of modern Britain in the first major study of the post war Attlee government to be published since 1997.

At Exeter he specialises in teaching and researching Churchill and all aspects of party politics during the period of the Third British Empire. Commensurate with his role as a Fellow of the Royal Historical Society he was one of the signatories to a letter that strongly defended the Historical Association: government attempts to depoliticise the teaching profession have been largely unsuccessful.

== Books ==
=== As sole author ===
- Age of Hope: Labour, 1945, and the Birth of Modern Britain (Bloomsbury Publishing, 2023).
- Winston Churchill: A Life in the News (Oxford University Press, 2020).
- Winston Churchill: Politics, Strategy and Statecraft (Bloomsbury Academic, 2016).
- The Roar of the Lion: The Untold Story of Churchill's World War II Speeches (Oxford University Press, 2013).
- Rhetoric: A Very Short Introduction (Oxford University Press, 2013).
- Churchill's Empire: The World That Made Him and the World He Made, (Macmillan, 2010).
- Lloyd George and Churchill: Rivals for Greatness, (Macmillan, 2007).
- The Labour Party and the Planned Economy, 1931–1951, (Royal Historical Society/Boydell & Brewer, 2003).

=== Co-written volumes ===
- with David Thackeray, Age of Promises: Electoral Pledges in Twentieth Century Britain (Oxford University Press, 2021).
- with Julia Gottlieb and Daniel Hucker, The Munich Crisis, Politics and the People: International, Transnational and Comparative Perspectives (Cultural History in Modern War series) (Manchester University Press, 2021).
- with David Thackeray, Electoral Pledges in Britain Since 1918: The Politics of Promises (Palgrave Macmillan, 2020).
- with Steven Fielding and Bill Schwarz, The Churchill Myths (Oxford University Press, 2020).
- with David Thackeray and Andrew Thompson, Imagining Britain's Economic Future, c.1800–1975: Trade, Consumerism, and Global Markets (Palgrave Macmillan, 2018).
- with John A. Hargreaves and Keith Laybourn, Liberal Reform and Industrial Relations: J.H. Whitley (1866-1935), Halifax Radical and Speaker of the House of Commons (Routledge Studies in Modern British History series) (Routledge, 2017).
- with Martin Thomas, Arguing About Empire: Imperial Rhetoric in Britain and France, 1882-1956 (Oxford University Press, 2017).
- with Martin Thomas, Rhetorics of Empire: Languages of Colonial Conflict after 1900 (Studies in Imperialism series) (Manchester University Press, 2017).
- with Andrew Thorpe, Parliament and Politics in the Age of Asquith and Lloyd George: The Diaries of Cecil Harmsworth MP, 1909–22 (Camden Fifth Series, Series Number 50) (Royal Historical Society/Cambridge University Press, 2016).
- with Julie Gottlieb, The Aftermath of Suffrage: Women, Gender, and Politics in Britain, 1918-1945 (Palgrave Macmillan, 2013).
- with Julie Gottlieb, Making Reputations: Power, Persuasion and the Individual in Modern British Politics (I.B. Tauris, 2005).
- with John Toye, The UN and Global Political Economy: Trade, Finance and Development (Indiana University Press, 2004)

== Academic publications ==
- "The Rhetorical Culture of the House of Commons after 1918", History: The Journal of the Historical Association, 99 (335), 270–298.
- "Keynes, Liberalism, and The Emancipation of the Mind", The English Historical Review, cev215-cev215.
