= Rory Brooks =

British businessman and philanthropist

Roderick Brooks CBE is a British businessman and philanthropist.

He graduated from the University of Manchester Institute of Science and Technology in 1975 and established the Rory and Elizabeth Brooks Foundation which funded the Brooks World Poverty Institute (combined with the Institute for Development Policy and Management to form the Global Development Institute in 2016) at the University of Manchester in 2005. The Foundation has continued its support of the University of Manchester, most recently granting a transformative £2 million gift in March 2024.

== Career ==
He co-founded the international private equity group MML Capital Partners in 1989. MML is a private equity firm specialising in growth capital.

== Philanthropy ==
In addition to his giving, Brooks has consistently promoted the practice of philanthropy and was appointed CBE in the 2015 Birthday Honours.

He was a member of the British Government Task Force on Philanthropy in Higher Education and was previously a director of the Centre for Social Justice. In June 2023 he was appointed as a member of the Charity Commission for England and Wales board for a three-year term, with the distinct responsibility for promoting philanthropy.

== Personal ==
He lives in Notting Hill with his wife, Elizabeth, and they have two adult children.
