= Colette Solomon =

- Education: University of the Western Cape, Institute of Development Studies University of Sussex (PhD), University of Cape Town (honorary doctorate)
- Occupations: policy researcher and women's rights activist
- Employer: University of Namibia
- Organization: Women on Farms Project (WFP)

Colette Ursula Solomon is a South African policy researcher, women's rights activist and the director of the feminist non-governmental organisation Women on Farms Project (WFP).

== Education ==
Solomon lives in Windhoek and was educated at the University of the Western Cape. She holds a PhD from the Institute of Development Studies, University of Sussex, for the 2003 doctoral dissertation Giving women choices?: development interfaces-women and credit in Tamale, Northern Ghana. She has received an honorary doctorate from the University of Cape Town.

== Career and activism ==
Solomon has undertaken policy research in Namibia, Malawi, Ethiopia and Ghana, focusing on the gendered implications and impact of rural development interventions, whilst working at the Social Sciences Division of the Multi Disciplinary Research Centre, University of Namibia.

In 2006, Soloman became director of the Women on Farms Project (WFP), which works with women farm workers who are employed on wine farms in the Western Cape and Northern Cape in South Africa and supports them to understand and exercise their rights. The organisation is partnered with Oxfam.

With WFP, Solomon raises awareness of issues experienced by women workers on farms to national and international audiences, including women earning less than their male counterparts; being paid less than the legal minimum wage and other labour law violations; seasonal workers needing a living wage, job security; household food security; housing conditions; access to drinking water and toilets in the vineyards; lack of protection from hazardous pesticides, the impact of climate change and drought on the agricultural industry; mechanisation; and the links between gender-based violence and alcohol consumption.

In 2015, Solomon opposed bail being granted to a suspect arrested in connection with the murder of Deoline Demas, a teenager she knew through the WFP's Young Women’s Programme.

During the COVID-19 pandemic Solomon campaigned for an increase to government grants for farm women.

Solomon was arrested while sitting in the road singing protest songs during an anti-eviction protest near to Simondium, Western Cape, in 2020. She appeared at Paarl Magistrates’ Court on charges of public violence, which were dropped. She was represented by Seeham Samaai, Director of the Women’s Legal Centre, South Africa. She has also spoken about farm evictions to Members of Parliament at the Constitutional Review Committee in 2018, and has provided evidence in the court cases of individual evicted farmers.

In 2023, Solomon was an endorser of a call made by several civil society organisations against the National Treasury’s tax regime proposals and was present at a march by farm workers to Parliament calling for a meeting with the Minister of Agriculture, Land Reform and Rural Development Thoko Didiza to discuss issues of food security, land redistribution and agriculture.

Solomon has joined protests over a decision by the Department of Agriculture, Land Reform and Rural Development to abandon a promise to phase out harmful pesticides in South Africa, which are banned in the European Union due to health and environmental risks. Her comments on how the European green transition can lead to environmentally and socially harmful impacts in the Global South have been cited by organisations such as the SOLIDAR Foundation.

== Publications and conferences ==
Solomon has contributed chapters to publications, such as "The Many Faces of Feminism in Namibia" in The Challenge of Local Feminisms (1993) with Dianne Hubbard, and Organizing Women Workers in the Informal Economy: Beyond the Weapons of the Weak (2013). She has written articles for the South African news agency GroundUp.

In 2011, Solomon presented at the Social Protection for Social Justice conference held at her alma mater the Institute of Development Studies in Brighton. In 2024 she delivered a session on stakeholder engagement, human rights abuses and due diligence in food supply chains at the 13th United Nations Forum on Business and Human Rights in Geneva.
