= Journal of International Development =

- Discipline: International development, development studies
- Language: English
- Edited by: Samuel Brazys, Arusha Cooray, Åshild Kolås and Krishna Chaitanya Vadlamannati

Publication details
- History: 1989–present
- Publisher: John Wiley & Sons (United States)
- Frequency: 8/year
- Impact factor: 1.821 (2020)

Standard abbreviations
- ISO 4: J. Int. Dev.

Indexing
- ISSN: 0954-1748 (print); 1099-1328 (web)
- OCLC no.: 43358630

Links
- Journal homepage

The Journal of International Development is the official peer-reviewed academic journal of the Development Studies Association. It publishes research on international development issues with its main focus on the social sciences (economics, politics, international relations, sociology, and anthropology) as well as development studies, although it also publishes work that involves both the natural and social sciences.
