= Vasanthi =

Vasanthi may refer to:

- Vasanthi (1988 film), an Indian Tamil-language film
- Vasanthi (2021 film), an Indian Malayalam-language film
- Vasanthi (actress), Indian actress and producer

== See also ==
- Vasanta (disambiguation)
- Basanti (disambiguation)
