= Karin Bäckstrand =

Swedish professor of political science

Karin Bäckstrand is professor of political science at Stockholm University, Sweden, who has written extensively on climate and environmental governance and advises the ICSU Earth System Governance project. She is a member of the Swedish Climate Policy Council (Klimapolitisk råd) in Sweden.
