= Chronic Poverty Research Centre =

The Chronic Poverty Research Centre (CPRC) was a British international partnership of universities, research institutes, and NGOs established in 2000 with initial funding from the UK's Department for International Development. It was established with initial funding from the UK's Department for International Development (DFID).

The partnership laid out a programme which ran for 10 years and ended in 2011.

CPRC aimed to focus attention on chronic poverty, stimulate national and international debate, deepen understanding of the causes of chronic poverty, and provide research, analysis, and policy guidance that will contribute to its reduction. The distinguishing feature of chronic poverty is its extended duration. CPRC uses chronic poverty to describe extreme poverty that persists for a long time - many years, an entire life, or even across generations. People in chronic poverty are those who have benefited least from economic growth and development. The chronically poor are commonly deprived across multiple dimensions. Combinations of capability deprivation, low levels of material assets and socio-political marginality keep them poor over long periods. Addressing chronic poverty is integral to the Millennium Development Goals and poverty eradication.

Gordon Brown and Hilary Benn launched the first Chronic Poverty Report in May 2004. A second report was completed in 2009.

== Chronic Poverty Advisory Network ==
The work of the CPRC programme led to the creation of the Chronic Poverty Advisory Network (CPAN). CPAN is a network of researchers, policy makers and practitioners across 17 countries which looks at tackling chronic poverty; it is hosted at the Institute of Development Studies (IDS) in Brighton, after 11 years with the Overseas Development Institute.

CPAN released a report on Pandemic Poverty in 2023.

In 2023, the Director of CPAN was Andrew Shepherd.
