= Basanta Kumar Das (ichthyologist) =

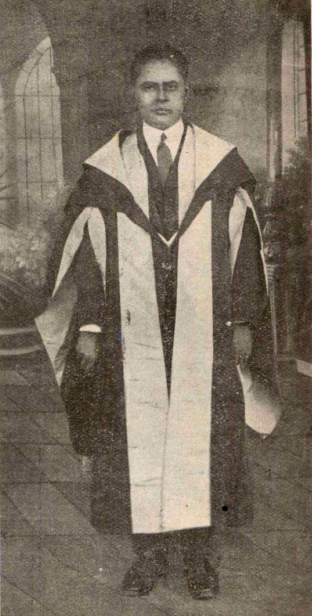
c. 1936

Basanta Kumar Das (21 November 1899 – 6 April 1957) was an Indian fisheries zoologist. He studied air-breathing fishes and served as a professor of zoology at the Osmania University and directed research on fisheries.

== Life and work ==
Das was born in Gangoor, Burdwan District. He studied at the government school in Allahabad before joining Muir Central College and receiving an MS in 1918. He became a lecturer in Allahabad University in 1920 and received a UP State Scholarship to study abroad. He joined Imperial College and conducted research under E.W. MacBride on studied air-breathing fishes and received a DSc from the University of London in 1926. He became a professor of zoology at the University of Calcutta (1926-31) and then at Osmania University (1931-52). He became a director of fisheries from 1953 until his death. He was involved in the planning of the Hyderabad zoo. He presided over the Zoology section of the Indian Science Congress in 1940. He received the Huxley Memorial Prize from Imperial College in 1931.
