= Harry S. Truman's 1949 inaugural address =

Speech on American foreign policy

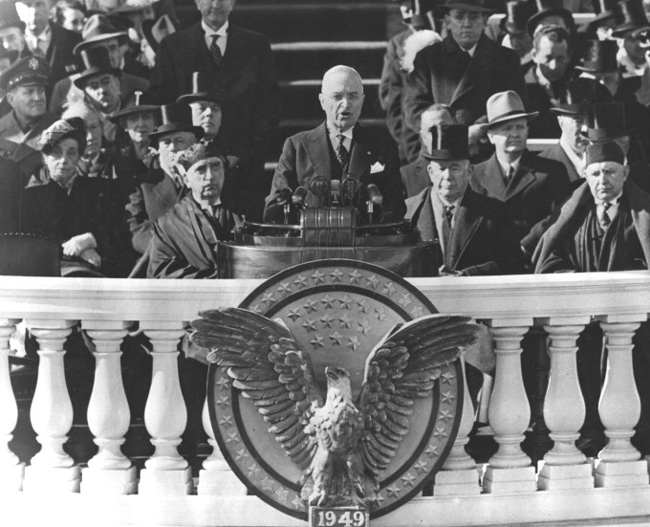
Truman giving his inaugural address on January 20, 1949

Harry S. Truman's inaugural address, known as the Four Point Speech, was delivered by United States president Harry S. Truman, on Thursday, January 20, 1949.

In a world only recently emerged from the shadow of World War II, in which freedom and human rights seemed under threat from many sides, this was Truman's response.

He challenged both Democrats and Republicans to assist people around the world struggling for freedom and human rights; to continue programs for world economic recovery; to strengthen international organizations; and to draw on the expertise of the United States to help people across the world help themselves in the struggle against ignorance, illness and despair.

== The four points ==
- First, "we will continue to give unfaltering support to the United Nations and related agencies, and we will continue to search for ways to strengthen their authority and increase their effectiveness."
- Second, "we will continue our programs for world economic recovery."
- Third, "we will strengthen freedom-loving nations against the dangers of aggression."
- Fourth, "we must embark on a bold new program for making the benefits of our scientific advances and industrial progress available for the improvement and growth of underdeveloped areas."
