= Chronic poverty =

Chronic poverty is a phenomenon whereby an individual or group is in a state of poverty over extended period of time. While determining both the implicit poverty line and the duration needed to be considered long-term is debated, the identification of this kind of poverty is considered important because it may require different policies than those needed for addressing transient poverty.

== See also ==
- Chronic Poverty Research Centre
- Cycle of poverty
- Extreme poverty
- Trans poverty
