= Global governance =

Movement towards political cooperation among transnational actors

Global governance (or world governance) comprises institutions that coordinate the behavior of transnational actors, facilitate cooperation, resolve disputes, and alleviate collective-action problems. Global governance entails making, monitoring, and enforcing rules. Within global governance, a variety of types of actors – not just states – exercise power.

In contrast to the traditional meaning of governance, the term global governance is used to denote the regulation of interdependent relations in the absence of an overarching political authority. An example of this is the international system, or relationships between independent states.

The concept of global governance began in the mid-19th century. It became particularly prominent in the aftermath of World War I, and more so after the end of World War II. Since World War II, the number of international organizations has also increased significantly. The number of actors involved in governance relationships—such as states, non-governmental organizations, firms, and epistemic communities—has also increased significantly.

Various terms have been used for the dynamics of global governance, such as complex interdependence, international regimes, multilevel governance, global constitutionalism, and ordered anarchy.

== Definition ==
The term global governance is broadly used to designate all regulations intended for organization and centralization of human societies on a global scale. Global governance has also been defined as "the complex of formal and informal institutions, mechanisms, relationships, and processes between and among states, markets, citizens and organizations, both inter- and non-governmental, through which collective interests on the global plane are articulated, rights and obligations are established, and differences are mediated".

Traditionally, government has been associated with governing, or with political authority, institutions, and, ultimately, control. Governance denotes a process through which institutions coordinate and control independent social relations, and that have the ability to enforce their decisions. However, governance is also used to denote the regulation of interdependent relations in the absence of an overarching political authority, such as in the international system. Some scholars refer to this as the development of global public policy.

The definition is flexible in scope, applying to general subjects such as global security or to specific documents and agreements such as the World Health Organization's Code on the Marketing of Breast Milk Substitutes. The definition applies whether the participation is bilateral (e.g. an agreement to regulate usage of a river flowing in two countries), function-specific (e.g. a commodity agreement), regional (e.g. the Treaty of Tlatelolco), or global (e.g. the Non-Proliferation Treaty).

In the light of the unclear meaning of the term global governance as a concept in international politics, some authors have proposed defining it not in substantive, but in disciplinary and methodological terms. For these authors, global governance is better understood as an analytical concept or optic that provides a specific perspective on world politics different from that of conventional international relations theory. Thomas G. Weiss and Rorden Wilkinson have even argued that global governance has the capacity to overcome some of the fragmentation of international relations as a discipline particularly when understood as a set of questions about the governance of world orders.

Other authors conceptualized global governance as a field of practice in which diverse stakeholders, such as public, private, and supra-governmental actors can compete for influence about issues that are not bound to national boundaries. This conceptualization allows to better understand the principles of exclusions of specific stakeholders from the negotiation field as some actors lack the economic, social, cultural and symbolic resources required to gain enough influence.

== History ==
The League of Nations (founded in 1920), the predecessor of the United Nations, was one of the first organizations to promote global governance.

While attempts of intergovernmental coordination of policy-making can be traced back to ancient times, comprehensive search for effective formats of international coordination and cooperation began after the end of World War I. It was during that post-war period that some of the still existing international institutions (or their immediate predecessors) were founded. Among thinkers who made major contributions to the period discussions on the goals and forms of international governance and policy coordination were J.M. Keynes with his "The Economic Consequences of the Peace" and G. Cassel with his works on the post-war development of the global monetary system.

The dissolution of the Soviet Union in 1991 marked the end of a long period of international history based on a policy of balance of powers. Since this historic event, the planet has entered a phase of geostrategic breakdown. The national-security model, for example, while still in place for most governments, is gradually giving way to an emerging collective conscience that extends beyond the restricted framework it represents.

In the 20th century, the risks associated with nuclear fission raised global awareness of environmental threats. The 1963 Partial Nuclear Test Ban Treaty prohibiting atmospheric nuclear testing marked the beginning of the globalization of environmental issues. Environmental law began to be modernized and coordinated with the Stockholm Conference (1972), backed up in 1980 by the Vienna Convention on the Law of Treaties. The Vienna Convention for the Protection of the Ozone Layer was signed and ratified in 1985. In 1987, 24 countries signed the Montreal Protocol which imposed the gradual withdrawal of CFCs.

== Methods ==
The "cooperative problem-solving arrangements" of global governance may be formal. In that case they take the shape of laws or formally constituted institutions for a variety of actors (such as state authorities, intergovernmental organizations (IGOs), non-governmental organizations (NGOs), private sector entities, civil society actors) to manage collective affairs. They may also be informal (as in the case of practices or guidelines) or ad hoc entities (as in the case of coalitions).

Global governance can be roughly divided into four stages:

1. agenda-setting (or global goal-setting);
2. policymaking,
3. implementation and enforcement, and
4. evaluation, monitoring, and adjudication.

=== Global goal-setting ===
A "new central approach in global governance" is global goal-setting. Governance of this kind is based on goals that are not legally binding, allow flexibility for each country, and do not come with strong institutional arrangements.

The Sustainable Development Goals (to be achieved during the years 2015 to 2030) are one example of global goal setting. They were "expected to have a major impact on the United Nations System" which is a key actor within the global governance concept. Previously, another attempt at "global governance by goal-setting" were the Millennium Development Goals from the year 2000 to 2015. Even earlier examples of global goal-setting include the "Plan of Action of the 1990 World Summit for Children" and the "first Development Decade that dates as far back as 1961".

However, results from a meta-analysis found that the Sustainable Development Goals (SDGs) had so far (as of 2023) failed to integrate the system of global governance and to bring international organizations together. By and large, the SDGs have not become a shared set of connecting goals, and their uptake in global governance has been limited. The SDGs are not taken up by a enough of the international organizations. Instead, international organizations cherry-pick only those SDGs that best fit their interest. In particular, they often cherry-pick SDG 8 (on decent work and economic growth), SDG 9 (on industry and innovation), and SDG 12 (on consumption and production).

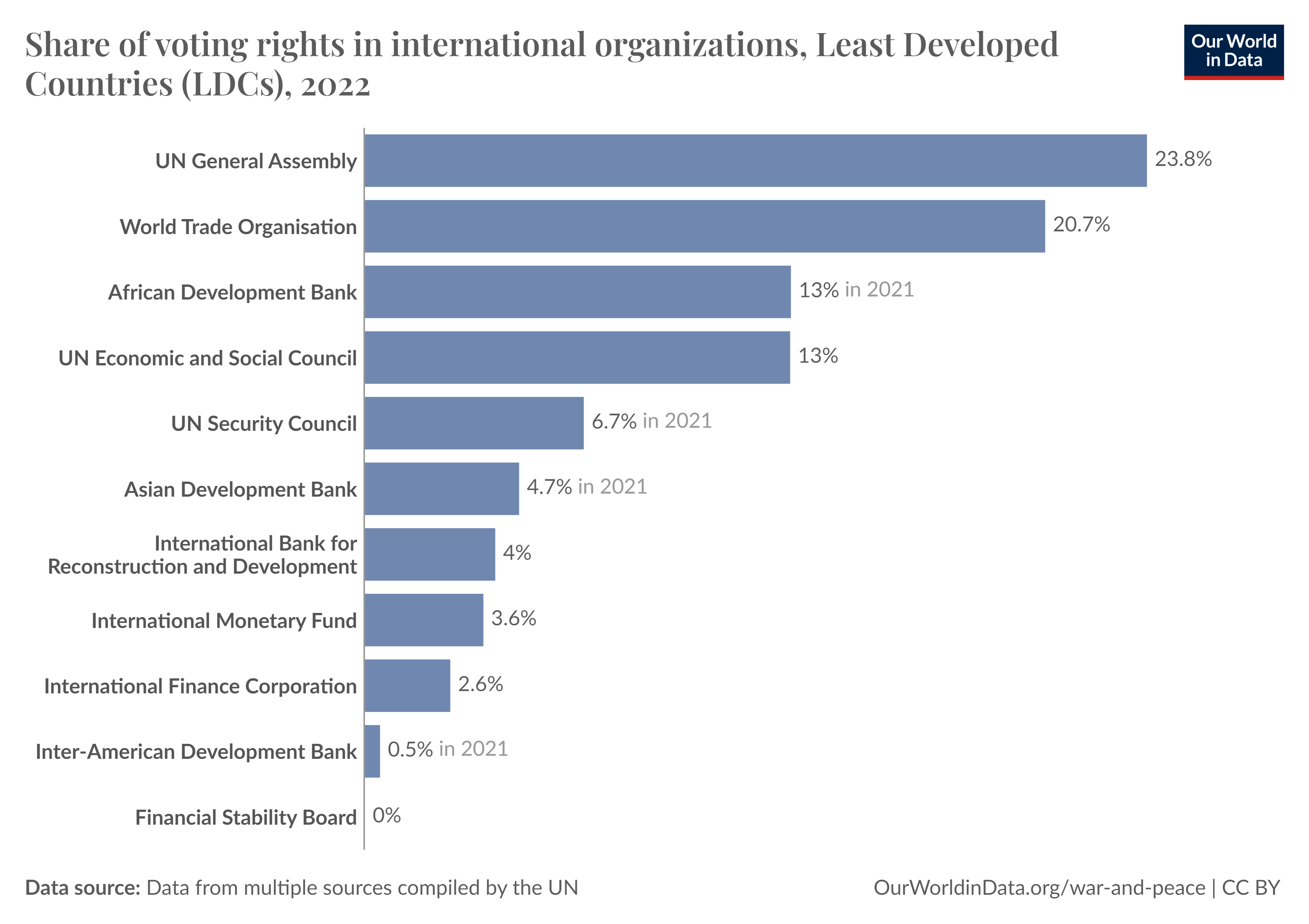
Indicator for Target 18.8 of SDG 16: Share of voting rights in international organizations, for Least Developed Countries (LDCs), as of 2022

One of the SDGs, Sustainable Development Goal 16 on "peace, justice and strong institutions", has a target and indicator regarding global governance (to be achieved by 2030). The wording of this Target 16.8 is: "Broaden and strengthen the participation of developing countries in the institutions of global governance." Indicator 16.8.1 is used to measure this target by monitoring the "proportion of members and voting rights of developing countries in international organizations". A UNDP report of 2024 reported that this indicator had made no progress since 2015: "No significant changes in these countries' voting rights were registered since 2015 at any of the international economic institutions".

=== Orchestration ===
Orchestration in global governance is defined as a form of soft and indirect steering characterized by a reliance on voluntarily recruited intermediaries. It fills governance deficits by complementing existing regimes and approaches. In other words, orchestration is an indirect mode of governance whereby an actor (e.g. an international organization or a national government) mobilizes one or more intermediaries to take influence on a certain target group. Three orchestration activities are agenda setting, coordination, and support. For example, the five regional commissions of the United Nations Economic and Social Council have carried out these activities (to varying degrees) as part of their role as orchestrators for the Sustainable Development Goals.

=== Intergovernmental treaty secretariats ===
International bureaucracies, such as intergovernmental treaty secretariats, play an independent role in global affairs. An example is the United Nations Framework Convention on Climate Change. Research suggests that these kinds of treaty secretariats have significant influence. They carry out important tasks in global policy-making. Unlike national governments, they lack the power to enforce laws. Instead, they use softer approaches, such as persuasion and coordination, to impact both global and domestic policy-making.

International bureaucracies can work as orchestrators that interact with non-state actors, such as civil society groups, non-profit entities, or the private sector. They can encourage national governments to agree on a more ambitious response to global problems and encourage application of global environmental politics. As of 2022, new alliances are being formed between intergovernmental treaty secretariats and non-state actors.

=== Others ===
A single organization may take the nominal lead on an issue, for example the World Trade Organization (WTO) in world trade affairs. Therefore, global governance is thought to be an international process of consensus-forming which generates guidelines and agreements that affect national governments and international corporations. Examples of such consensus would include WTO policies on health issues.

World authorities including international organizations and corporations achieve deference to their agenda through different means. Authority can derive from institutional status, expertise, moral authority, capacity, or perceived competence.

There is an increased recognition of courts as institutions that influence global governance. References to the role of courts mostly occur in legal discussions about the establishment of an international environmental court and in the domain of transnational climate law, climate governance and climate litigation.

== Challenges ==
Stronger international cooperation is needed to tackle the interconnected global governance challenges such as health, trade, and the environment.

=== Fragmentation ===
Global governance for sustainability is highly fragmented, consisting of many international organizations, states, and other actors working in separate clusters. A study from 2022 identified 335 international organizations active in this field. These organizations are often weakly connected. They compete for resources and focus on their own mandates. Proposed reforms include clustering institutions, embracing complexity, or centralizing global sustainability governance under strong coordinating authorities.

Fragmentation contributes to the complexity of global environmental governance. It occurs when multiple public and private institutions operate in the same policy area, leading to overlapping responsibilities and potential inefficiencies. For example, the theme complex of climate change is no longer governed solely by the UN Framework Convention on Climate Change (UNFCCC) but also by institutions like the World Trade Organization (WTO), the UN Security Council, and the International Maritime Organization (IMO), which do not have climate change as their main focus.

One of the negative consequences of fragmentation is the emergence of conflicting institutional centers within regime complexes. This can make it harder to establish legally binding, internationally accepted regulation. For example, the UNFCCC and International Maritime Organization (IMO) have both addressed the regulation of greenhouse gas emissions from international shipping but without reaching consensus for solving the problem.

The United Nations' Sustainable Development Goals (SDGs), adopted in 2015, aimed to improve policy coherence and institutional integration among the myriad of international institutions. However, research suggests that this aim has not been achieved: Fragmentation has not decreased. Instead, institutions have become more isolated, forming silos around their specific SDG issues and around the economic, social, and environmental dimensions of sustainable development.

Scholars have discussed the formation of an overarching institutional framework as a means to improve institutional interaction, more effectively address transboundary environmental problems, and advance sustainable development. The idea for the creation of a new, overarching World Environment Organization (WEO) was first discussed around the year 2000.

Others have argued for modifying existing decision-making procedures and institutional boundaries in order to enhance their effectiveness instead of creating new—likely dysfunctional—overarching frameworks. For example, they have said that instead of creating a WEO to safeguard the environment, environmental issues should be directly incorporated into the World Trade Organization (WTO). Some academics also argue that multiple institutions and some degree of overlap and duplication in policies is necessary to ensure maximum output from the system.

=== Inclusiveness ===
It is an ambition of modern global governance to have a higher level of inclusiveness with regards to advancing the interests of low-income countries. This applies in particular to least developed countries, small island developing states and landlocked developing countries.

== Global environmental governance ==
The most pressing transboundary environmental challenges include climate change, biodiversity loss, and land degradation.

A publication of 2020 described global environmental governance as "one of the institutionally most dynamic areas in world politics" in the last thirty years. Numerous new international institutions and actors have emerged in this field since the 1970s. This growth has resulted in overlapping institutional roles, contributing to both fragmentation and complexity. However, it also creates opportunities for cooperation and productive interactions between institutions, involving multiple actors and levels of governance.

=== United Nations Environmental Programme (UNEP) ===
The United Nations Environmental Programme (UNEP) is responsible for coordinating responses to environmental issues within the United Nations System. For example, UNEP has played a key role as a coordinator for a range of multilateral environmental agreements (MEAs). However, UNEP has been widely considered as a weak international organization. Many institutional arrangements for regulating environmental matters have become increasingly independent of UNEP over the past decades (as of 2022). These arrangements now resemble a loosely and sometimes poorly coordinated network. Scholars have also doubted the effectiveness of a centralized overarching institutional framework to govern global environmental governance and law.

=== Proposed reforms ===
The International Institute for Sustainable Development proposed a reform agenda for global environmental governance (GEG) in 2006. They formulated five goals that "can be the basis of a shared global vision for the global environmental governance system": leadership, knowledge ("science should be the authoritative basis of sound environmental policy"), coherence (see also policy coherence for development), performance, mainstreaming ("incorporate environmental concerns and actions within other areas of international policy and action, and particularly so in the context of sustainable development").

Political scientists have said that structural changes in global environmental governance are urgently needed both within and outside United Nations (UN) institutions. This applies to fully fledged international organizations, specialized bodies and programs, as well as secretariats of international environmental agreements. Three examples of intergovernmental treaty secretariats include the United Nations Framework Convention on Climate Change (climate secretariat), the Convention on Biological Diversity (biodiversity secretariat), and the United Nations Convention to Combat Desertification (desertification secretariat). These secretariats can reach out to non-state actors in order to pursue specific policy goals.

Treaty secretariats can help break political deadlock by gaining support from transnational and sub-national actors. They can engage with non-state actors to encourage national governments to adopt more ambitious international agreements.

=== International conventions and agreements ===
The International Environmental Agreement Database Project currently (as of 2020) comprises almost 1300 multilateral agreements and over 2200 bilateral agreements (see also list of international environmental agreements). Until now, the formulation of environmental policies at the international level has been divided by theme, sector or territory, resulting in treaties that overlap or clash. International attempts to coordinate environment institutions, include the Inter-Agency Coordination Committee and the Commission for Sustainable Development, but these institutions are not powerful enough to effectively incorporate the three aspects of sustainable development.

The main three multilateral conventions, also known as Rio Conventions (because they were agreed at the Earth Summit held in Rio de Janeiro in June 1992), are as follows:

1. Convention on Biological Diversity (CBD) (1992–1993): aims to conserve biodiversity. Related agreements include the Cartagena Protocol on Biosafety.
2. United Nations Framework Convention on Climate Change (UNFCC) (1992–1994): aims to stabilize concentrations of greenhouse gases at a level that would stabilize the climate system without threatening food production, and enabling the pursuit of sustainable economic development; it incorporates the Kyoto Protocol.
3. United Nations Convention to Combat Desertification (UNCCD) (1994–1996): aims to combat desertification and mitigate the effects of drought and desertification, in developing countries (though initially the convention was primarily meant for Africa).

Further international conventions:

- Ramsar Convention on Wetlands of International Importance (1971)
- Convention on International Trade in Endangered Species of Wild Flora and Fauna (CITES) (entered into force on 1 July 1975)
- Bonn Convention on the Conservation of Migratory Species (entered into force in 1983)
- Convention on the Protection and Use of Transboundary Watercourses and International Lakes (Water Convention) (entered into force on 6 October 1996)
- Basel Convention on the Control of Transboundary Movements of Hazardous Wastes and their Disposal (entered into force on 5 May 1992)
- Rotterdam Convention on the Prior Informed Consent Procedures for Certain Hazardous Chemicals and Pesticides in International Trade (effective as of 24 February 2004)
- Stockholm Convention on Persistent Organic Pollutants (COP) (entered into force on 17 May 2004)

=== Aspects of Global North and Global South ===
Scholars have noted that unindustrialized countries in the Global South sometimes are disconnected from environmentalism and perceive environmental governance to be a "luxury" priority for the Global North. Also, environmental governance priorities in the Global North have been at odds with the desire to focus on economic development in the Global South.

Some analysts propose a shift towards "non-state" actors for the development of environmental governance. Environmental politics researcher Karin Bäckstrand claims this will increase transparency, accountability, and legitimacy. In some cases, scholars have noted that environmental governance in the Global North has had adverse consequences on the environment in the Global South. Environmental and economic priorities in the Global North do not always align with those in the Global South. Tension between countries in the Global North and Global South has caused some academics to criticize global environmental governance for being too slow of a process to enact policy change.

=== Examples ===
==== Climate governance ====
Climate governance is the diplomacy, mechanisms and response measures "aimed at steering social systems towards preventing, mitigating or adapting to the risks posed by climate change". A definitive interpretation is complicated by the wide range of political and social science traditions (including comparative politics, political economy and multilevel governance) that are engaged in conceiving and analysing climate governance at different levels and across different arenas. In academia, climate governance has become the concern of geographers, anthropologists, economists and business studies scholars.

Climate governance – that is, effective management of the global climate system – is thus of vital importance. However, building effective collective mechanisms to govern impacts on the climate system at the planetary level presents particular challenges, e.g. the complexity of the relevant science and the progressive refinement of scientific knowledge about our global climate and planetary systems, and the challenge of communicating this knowledge to the general public and to policy makers. There is also the urgency of addressing this issue; the Intergovernmental Panel on Climate Change (IPCC) has underlined that the international community has a narrow window of opportunity to act to keep global temperature rise at safe levels. Modern international climate governance is organized around three pillars: mitigation, adaptation and means of implementation. Under each pillar are many issues and policies, illustrating the many ways climate change affects society.

In the first decade of the 21st century, a paradox had arisen between rising awareness about the causes and consequences of climate change and an increasing concern that the issues that surround it represent an intractable problem. Initially, climate change was approached as a global issue, and climate governance sought to address it on the international stage. This took the form of Multilateral Environmental Agreements (MEAs), beginning with the United Nations Framework Convention on Climate Change (UNFCCC) in 1992. With the exception of the Kyoto Protocol, international agreements between nations had been largely ineffective in achieving legally binding emissions cuts. With the end of the Kyoto Protocol's first commitment period in 2012, between 2013 and 2015 there was no legally binding global climate regime. This inertia on the international political stage contributed to alternative political narratives that called for more flexible, cost effective and participatory approaches to addressing the multifarious problems of climate change. These narratives relate to the increasing diversity of methods that are being developed and deployed across the field of climate governance.

==== Protecting the ozone layer ====
On 16 September 1987 the United Nations General Assembly signed the Montreal Protocol to address the declining ozone layer. Since that time, the use of chlorofluorocarbons (industrial refrigerants and aerosols) and farming fungicides such as methyl bromide has mostly been eliminated, although other damaging gases are still in use.

== Global health governance ==
Where governance refers to institutional arrangements between state and non-state actors, global health governance refers to such institutional arrangements that have a direct and indirect impact on health. Prior to 2002, the term "global health governance" did not exist; it emerged as a description of cross-border initiatives (structures and processes) tackling global health. Global health governance (GHG) has come to replace an earlier term "international health governance" (IHG) which worked in a more state-centric system and era. There is a call for a clearer definition and "conceptual clarity" for GHG due to its multiple meanings and varied uses.

Global health governance foregrounds the interconnectivity that is needed between state and non-state actors. This interconnectivity differs from former global health systems in the greater role for non-state actors whose numbers are also increasing. Non-state actors are seen as vital at a time when state actors alone cannot address the many health challenges. Global health governance gives new roles for both non-state and state actors, in areas such as agenda setting, resource mobilization and allocation, and dispute settlement. These changing roles have generated new kinds of partnerships such as the global campaign against the marketing of breast milk substitutes: collaboration between UNICEF, WHO, the International Baby Food Action Network, and other like-minded non-governmental organizations (NGOs) came together to address this issue. Given the diversity found within the NGO community, specific NGOs can work in collaboration with state actors on specific issues, forming a more permanent yet fluid collaboration between the two.

== See also ==
- Engaged theory – Comprehensive critical theory
- Global citizenship – Idea that all people have rights and responsibilities from being a member of the world
- New World Order (conspiracy theory) – Conspiracy theory regarding a totalitarian world government
- Social Network Analysis – Analysis of social structures using network and graph theory
- United Nations Global Compact – Non-binding United Nations pact
- World community – Political or humanitarian term
- World government – Notion of a single common political authority for all of humanity
