= Basanta Kumar Das =

Basanta Kumar Das may refer to:

- Basanta Kumar Das (Indian politician) (1898–1984)
- Basanta Kumar Das (Pakistani politician) (1883–1965)
- Basanta Kumar Das (ichthyologist) (1899–1957), Indian zoologist
