= Vasantha Muthuswamy =

Indian bioethicist

- Born: 12 July 1948; Madras, India
- Died: 21 February 2023 (age 74); Mumbai, Maharashtra, India
- Occupation(s): Bioethicist, physician

Vasantha Muthuswamy (12 July 1948 – 21 February 2023) was an Indian physician and bioethicist, head of the Indian Council of Medical Research's Division of Basic Medical Sciences, Traditional Medicine, and Bioethics, and the Division of Reproductive Health and Nutrition, from 1990 to 2008. She was a leader in establishing, revising, and promoting ethical guidelines for medical research in India. She participated in international organizations and projects focused on bioethics, and was a noted critic of ethics dumping.

== Early life and education ==
Muthuswamy was born in Madras (now Chennai), the daughter of Shri R. Seetharaman and Shrimati Tirupura Sundari. She attended St. Raphael's Girls' Higher Secondary School and Stella Maris College, and earned an MBBS degree at R. G. Kar Medical College in Calcutta (Kolkata). She earned a medical degree in 1979, at the Institute of Obstetrics and Gynaecology, Madras Medical College.

== Career ==
Muthuswamy began her medical career in 1979, in the Toxaemia Research Unit at Vanivilas Women and Children Hospital in Bangalore (Bengaluru). She joined the Indian Council of Medical Research (ICMR) in 1983, as a Senior Research Officer working in the Division of Basic Medical Sciences Traditional Medicine, and Bioethics, and the Division of Reproductive Health and Nutrition. She became director of those divisions in 1990, and retired from that role in 2008.

Muthuswamy was a key author of the revised Ethical Guidelines for Biomedical Research on Human Subjects (2000), and worked on further revisions of those guidelines, published in 2006 and 2017. Near the end of her life, she worked on national ethics guidelines for reviewing COVID-19 research. She was founding secretary of the Forum for Ethical Review Committees in the Asian and Pacific Regions (FERCAP), president of the Forum for Ethical Review Committees in India (FERCI) from 2019 to 2023, and chair of the ICMR's Central Ethics Committee in Human Research. She served on the Editorial Advisory Board of the Indian Journal of Medical Ethics. She was a recognized expert on ethics dumping in India.

Muthuswamy received Lifetime Achievement Awards from the Indian Journal of Medical Ethics, the Indian Society for Clinical Research, and Yenepoya University. In 1997, she was a World Health Organization (WHO) Visiting Fellow at the Kennedy Institute of Ethics at Georgetown University.

== Publications ==
- "Use of Animals in Scientific Research" (2000, with N. V. Giridharan and V. Kumar)
- "Physician migration: Views from professionals in Colombia, Nigeria, India, Pakistan and the Philippines" (2005, with Avraham Astor, Tasleem Akhtar, María Alexandra Matallana, Folarin A. Olowu, Veronica Tallo, and Reidar K. Lie)
- "Status of ethical review and challenges in India" (2005)
- "Ethical issues in HIV/AIDS research" (2005)
- "Capacity Building for Clinical Trials in India" (2006, with Falguni Sen)
- "Ethical issues in genetic counselling with special reference to haemoglobinopathies" (2011)
- "Ethical issues in clinical research" (2013)
- "The new 2013 seventh version of the Declaration of Helsinki: More old wine in a new bottle" (2014)
- "Biobanking and Privacy in India" (2016, with Sachin Chaturvedi and Krishna Ravi Srinivas)
- Ethics dumping: case studies from north-south research collaborations (2018, with Doris Schroeder, Julie Cook, François Hirsch, and Solveig Fenet)
- "Hinduism and Social Responsibility" (2018)
- Biomedical Ethics Perspects in the Indian Context (2021, with Roli Mathur and Nandini K. Kumar)
- "Fostering ethical biomedical and health research in India during the COVID-19 pandemic" (2020, with Nandini K. Kumar)

== Personal life ==
Muthuswamy married political science and law professor, M. Muthuswamy in 1979. They had a son, Mahesh. Her husband died in 2013, and she died in 2023, at the age of 74, in Mumbai.
