= Basant =

Basant or Vasant may refer to:

- Basant (festival), a historic spring festival in the Punjab
- Basant (raga), an Indian classical raga
- Basant (film), a 1942 Indian film
- Vasant (magazine), Indian Gujarati-language magazine
- Vasanta (season), the spring season

== See also ==
- Vasanta (disambiguation)
- Basanta (disambiguation)
- Vasant Panchami, a springtime Hindu festival
