= Vasanta Group =

UK-based office supplies company

- Industry: Office supplies
- Founded: 2007
- Headquarters: Sheffield, England
- Area served: United Kingdom, Europe
- Revenue: £383,800,000
- Number of employees: 1400
- Divisions: VOW; VOW Retail; Supplies Team
- Website: vasantagroup.com

Vasanta Group is the UK's largest office supplies company, headquartered in Sheffield.

Formed in 2007 after the management buyout of Kingfield Heath, the company then merged with ISA and Supplies Team to form Vasanta Group. It is listed on the Top Track 100 of the UK's 100 largest private companies.

Now the UK's largest offices supplies company, it distributes office supplies on a UK wide basis, and computer supplies on a European basis.

In July 2009 Vasanta announced a refinancing deal with Endless.

Vasanta is listed on the Top Track 100 of the UK's 100 largest private companies.

== See also ==
- Office Depot
- Staples Inc.
