= Institute of Development Studies =

UK research institute

- Type: Research institute
- Established: 1966; 60 years ago
- Affiliations: University of Sussex
- Director: Anuradha Joshi
- Location: Library Road, Brighton and Hove, East Sussex BN1 9RE United Kingdom
- Nickname: IDS
- Website: ids.ac.uk

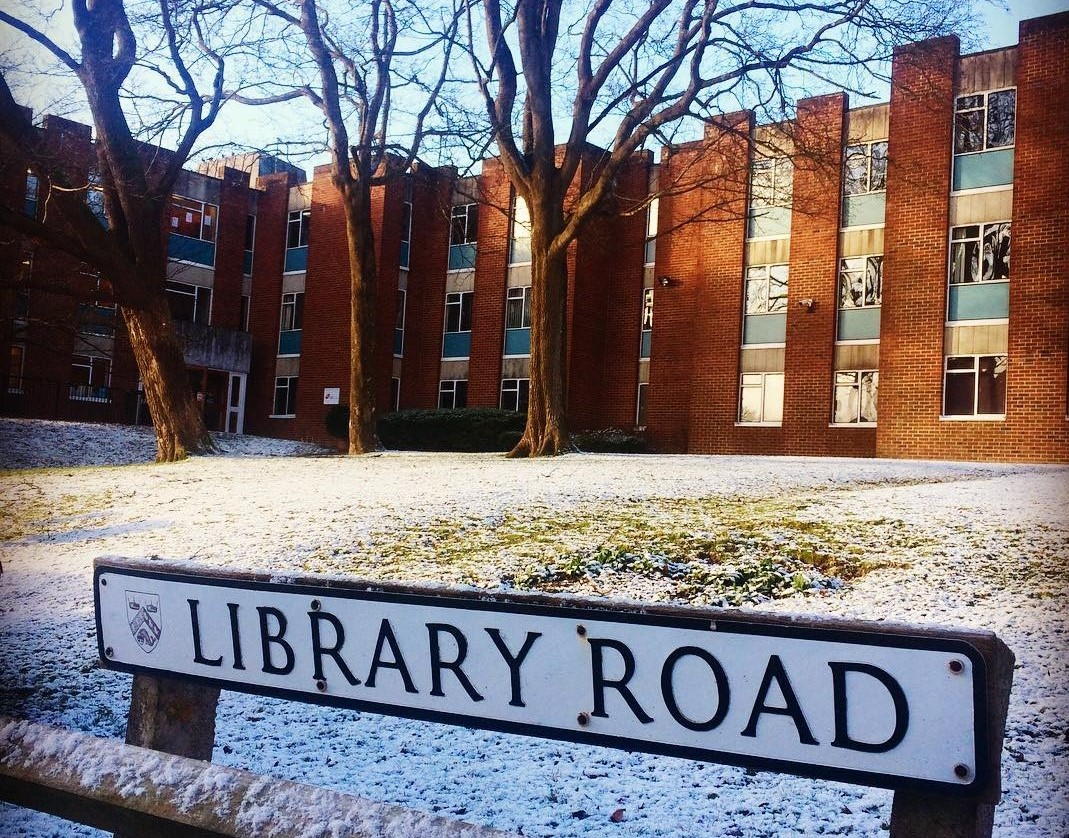
IDS at Sussex University

The Institute of Development Studies (IDS) is a research and learning organisation affiliated with the University of Sussex in Brighton, England, and based on its campus in Falmer, East Sussex. It delivers research and teaching in the area of development studies.

== History ==
The Institute of Development Studies (IDS) was established in 1966 at the University of Sussex by economist Dudley Seers, who served as its first director from 1967 to 1972. The institute was founded to promote research, teaching, and communication on economic development, addressing global issues such as poverty, inequality, and social justice.

Later directors included Mike Faber (1982–87), John Toye (1987 to 1997); Keith Bezanson (1997–2004); Lawrence Haddad (2004–2014) and Melissa Leach (2014–2023).

The current director of IDS is Anuradha Joshi.

In partnership with the University of Sussex, IDS has ranked first in the world for development studies every year since 2016, according to the QS World University Rankings by Subject.

== Structure and research ==
IDS consists of ten research clusters or teams which concentrate their research on specific angles of development.

IDS has engaged in teaching since 1973 when the first MPhil course in development began. Currently it teaches at postgraduate and doctorate level and has been awarded accreditation for its teaching programme by the European Association of Development Research and Training Institutes (EADI).

IDS offers eight master's courses and one PhD degree.

== Funding ==
IDS is a registered charity with no core funding. The top funders of IDS are:

- the UK Foreign, Commonwealth and Development Office (formerly the Department for International Development)
- UK Research and Innovation Councils
- Other Charitable Foundations
- Other Governments.

With the University of Sussex, IDS offer a range of scholarship opportunities to help fund MA degree students.

== Notable staff ==
=== Current staff ===
- Sir Richard Jolly, a development economist who has held various positions within the UNDP and OECD, and was awarded honorary fellowship from The International Institute of Social Studies in 2007.
- Robert Chambers, who has contribution to development for his work in participatory rural appraisal, is widely acknowledged.
- Ian Scoones was co-director of the STEPS Centre until its closure in 2022, and is well known for his research into land reform in Zimbabwe.
- Stephen Devereux is the author of Theories of Famine.
- Deepak Nayyar, development economist and current Chair of the IDS Board of Trustees
- Mick Moore, head of the International Centre for Tax and Development
- Carlos Fortin, political scientist, Assistant Secretary-General, United Nations (UNCTAD, Geneva), 1990–2005, currently Emeritus Fellow and Research Associate
- Philip Proudfoot, anthropologist based in the Power and Popular Politics Cluster
- Ernest Aryeetey, development economist and former vice-chancellor of the University of Ghana, member of the IDS Board of Trustees
- Martin Griffiths, former Under-Secretary-General for Humanitarian Affairs and Emergency Relief Coordinator an honorary research associate of the IDS Humanitarian Learning Centre
- Philippe Lazzarini, former UNRWA Commissioner-General, honorary associate.
- Hilary Wainwright, British sociologist and honorary associate of the Power and Popular Politics Cluster.
- José Antonio Ocampo, colombian writer, economist, and academic as well as former Minister for finance; member of the IDS Board of Trustees
- Ha-Joon Chang, development economist and member of the IDS Board of Trustees

=== Past staff ===
- Bob Baulch – worked for 13 years as a fellow at IDS for 13 years before joining Prosperity Initiatives in 2008.
- Chris Colclough – a fellow (from 1975), and professorial fellow (from 1994)
- Stephany Griffith-Jones – has contributed to research and policy suggestions on how to make the domestic and international financial system more stable so it can better serve the needs of inclusive economic development and the real economy.
- Susan Joekes is noted for her part in the Women in Development approach.
- Naila Kabeer is a professor of gender and development at the Gender Institute, London School of Economics.
- Simon Maxwell worked at IDS for 16 years and is now senior research associate at the Overseas Development Institute.
- Peter Newell is a professor at the University of Sussex, specialising in climate change. He is co-editor of the European Journal of International Relations, associate editor of the journal Global Environmental Politics and sits on the editorial board of Global Environmental Change, the Journal of Environment and Development and the Journal of Peasant Studies.
- Neil McCulloch – Previously a research fellow in IDS Globalisation team. An economist specialising in the analysis of poverty in developing countries and the linkages between poverty and both global and local economic reform. Has led research on the possibilities of the Tobin tax for development.
- Andrea Cornwall, political anthropologist who specialises in the anthropology of gender and sexuality, citizen participation and participatory research.
- Mark Robinson – now the chief professional officer for governance, social development, conflict and humanitarian aid in the UK Department for International Development.
- Hans Singer – known for Prebisch-Singer thesis, Bretton Woods
- Chris Stevens is senior research associate at ODI concentrating on the impacts of Northern policies on the South.
- Robert Wade is professor of political economy at London School of Economics. Economist for the World Bank during the 1980s.
- Ronald Dore- Leading Japanologist and Sociologist
- Ben Ramalingam, author of Aid on the Edge of Chaos

== Notable alumni ==
- Carlos Alvarado Quesada, 48th President of Costa Rica – MA Development Studies 2009
- Shantanu Gupta, Author and Political Analyst, MA Governance, Development and Public Policy 2009
- Joanna Kerr, Chief Executive of Greenpeace Canada – MA Gender and Development 1991
- Edwin Irizarry Mora, Puerto Rican pro-independence leader – PhD/DPhil Development Studies 1989
- Robina P. Marks, South African High Commissioner to Sri Lanka – MA Gender and Development 1999
- Salim Mvurya, Kenyan politician – Power Participation and Social Change 2011
- Nancy Okail, Egyptian scholar and activist – Doctor of Philosophy 2009
- Naana Otoo-Oyortey, social activist and women's rights defender – Mphil Development 1993
- Melanie Robinson, Her Majesty's Ambassador to the Republic of Zimbabwe – MA Governance and Development 2012
- Colette Solomon, South African policy researcher, women's rights activist and the director of the non-governmental organisation Women on Farms Project – PhD 2003
- Isatou Touray, Vice President of The Gambia – PhD/DPhil Development Studies 2004
- Euclid Tsakalotos, Greek Minister of Finance – Mphil Development 1984
- Marta Zabaleta, Argentinian political refugee – PhD/DPhil Development Studies 1979

== See also ==
- The New Bottom Billion
- ELDIS ("Electronic Development and Environment Information System")
- Chronic Poverty Research Centre
