= Ethics dumping =

Unethical research practice

Ethics dumping is a concept in research ethics that describes the export of unethical research practices from higher-income to lower-income settings. Ethics dumping can occur intentionally when researchers knowingly side-step restrictive regulatory regimes to undertake research abroad that would be prohibited in their home setting. It can also occur unintentionally, especially in the context of international research, if researchers lack the knowledge or ethics awareness to undertake studies appropriately in unfamiliar settings.

== History ==
The term 'ethics dumping' originated with a call for funding in the European Union Horizon 2020 framework program. In December 2013, funding stream GARRI.6.2014 invited proposals to reduce the risk of ethics dumping, defined as “the exportation of research practices that would not be accepted in Europe on ethical grounds”. The European Commission describes ethics dumping within Horizon 2020 as follows: "Due to the progressive globalisation of research activities, the risk is higher that research with sensitive ethical issues is conducted by European organisations outside the EU in a way that would not be accepted in Europe from an ethical point of view. This exportation of these non-compliant research practices is called ethics dumping".
In 2015, a proposal from the TRUST consortium was selected by peer reviewers from a range of proposals submitted to GARRI.6.2014 to tackle the problem of ethics dumping. The primary output from the TRUST project work to reduce the risk of ethics dumping was a new code of ethics: the Global Code of Conduct for Research in Resource-Poor Settings (see below).

== Examples ==
The following are some examples of different types of ethics dumping.

- Choosing a location or population for research, which is unlikely to benefit in full, or at all, from the research, for instance: Avian influenza research involving Indonesian human blood samples, when Indonesians were unlikely to benefit from the resulting vaccines.
- Imposing burdens and risks on research participants who are unlikely to benefit themselves, for instance: Ebola virus research undertaken in a resource-poor setting that had no incidence of Ebola, and amongst vulnerable populations who were unlikely to obtain access to the resulting products and services.
- Exporting valuable materials abroad without benefit sharing, for instance: Export of biological samples from South Africa “to developed countries occurs frequently” and whilst research “participants were supportive of providing samples for research, serious concerns were voiced about future use, benefit sharing and export of samples”.
- Undertaking medical research where the control group is only offered placebo even though an effective alternative is available, for instance: Three clinical trials on cervical cancer in India contributed to the deaths of 254 women in the control group as “known and effective methods of screening for cervical cancer were … withheld from 141,000 women in areas where it was known to be of high incidence and prevalence”.
- Undertaking research without ethics approval, for instance: Failure to obtain ethical approval for research in Nepal or effort to obtain retrospective ethical approval in Liberia when the publication of research results was otherwise blocked.
- Refusing to accept research participants’ rights, for instance: Refusal by an overseas company conducting a Chinese clinical trial to pay financial compensation for harm incurred as a result of taking part in medical research.
- Culturally inappropriate conduct of researchers, for instance: “Researchers took photographs of individuals in their homes, of breastfeeding mothers, or of underage children, whilst ignoring our social customs and norms. Bribes or other advantages were offered”.

== The Global Code of Conduct for Research in Resource-Poor Settings ==
The main initiative to counter ethics dumping is the Global Code of Conduct for Research in Resource-Poor Settings. This was developed by the multinational TRUST project team of ethicists, researchers, policy makers, research funders, industry personnel, medics, and representatives from communities who had extensive experience of being exploited in research. For example, Andries Steenkamp, a revered San Leader (1960-2016) and member of the TRUST consortium, expressed the need for a code of ethics. "We get given consent forms and documents, often in a hurry. We sign because we need the money and then end up with regret. It feels like a form of abuse. They want something from us and they know how to get it. Because of our socio-economic conditions, we will always be vulnerable to those from the North. A code of ethics is needed". The resultant code consists of 23 short articles (stipulations), that are designed to address risks for ethics dumping, and framed around a new moral framework (fairness, respect, care and honesty). The ethics code applies across all research disciplines from biology to zoology and aims to establish equitable partnerships in research. In 2018 it was adopted by the European Commission as a mandatory reference document for applicants to Europe’s biggest research fund: Horizon 2020 and the forthcoming Horizon Europe, to ensure its impact on the practice of ethics dumping. This code of conduct is mandatory for researchers applying for these funding streams and who plan to undertake research activities in low and middle-income countries.
