= Rorden Wilkinson =

British academic and author (born 1970)

- Born: February 13, 1970 (age 56)
- Years active: 1997–present
- Organizations: International Studies Association (Vice President); Academy of Social Sciences (Fellow)

Academic background
- Education: University of Liverpool; University of Kent; University of Auckland

Academic work
- Discipline: International political economy, global governance, international trade
- Institutions: Macquarie University
- Notable ideas: Research on the World Trade Organization and global institutions
- Awards: SWIPE Mentoring Award (2014); Fellow of the Royal Society of Arts

Rorden Wilkinson (born 13 February 1970) is a British-Australian political economist, international relations expert, and academic leader. He is Deputy Vice-Chancellor (Academic) and Registrar, and Professor of International Political Economy at Macquarie University, Sydney, Australia.

== Early life and education ==
Wilkinson was born on 13 February 1970. He holds a BA (Hons) in Economics (with Economic and Social History) from the University of Liverpool, an MA in International Relations from the University of Kent, and a PhD in Political Economy from the University of Auckland, awarded in 1997.

== Career ==
Wilkinson began his academic career at the University of Auckland before joining the University of Manchester. During 17 years at Manchester, he served as, among other roles, Professor of International Political Economy and Research Director of the Brooks World Poverty Institute.

He later joined the University of Sussex, where he was Professor of Global Political Economy, Chair of the Department of International Relations, and Deputy Pro-Vice-Chancellor (Education and Innovation).

From 2020 to 2022, he served as Pro Vice-Chancellor (Education and Student Experience) and Professor of International Political Economy at UNSW Sydney.

In 2022, he was appointed Deputy Vice-Chancellor (Academic) at Macquarie University responsible for overseeing academic strategy, education quality, student experience, curriculum renewal, digital learning, and regulatory compliance.

Wilkinson has held visiting academic appointments at Brown University, Wellesley College, and the Australian National University.

== Research and contributions ==
His research focuses on international political economy, particularly on multilateral trade, the World Trade Organization, global governance, and international development. He has advised and participated in policy initiatives including the Commonwealth Consultative Committee on Trade and the World Economic Forum/ICTSD E15 Initiative.

From 2002 to 2021, he co-edited the Global Institutions book series with Thomas G. Weiss and serves on the editorial board of the journal Global Governance. He is a Fellow of the Academy of Social Sciences (UK), a Lifetime Fellow of the Royal Society of Arts, and a graduate of the Australian Institute of Company Directors. He also served as Vice President of the International Studies Association and in 2014 received the ISA Society for Women in International Political Economy mentoring award.

== Selected publications ==
- Rethinking Global Governance (with Thomas G. Weiss, 2019)
- What’s Wrong with the WTO and How to Fix It (2014)
- The WTO: Crisis and the Governance of Global Trade (2006)
- Multilateralism and the World Trade Organization (2000)
- Editor or co-editor of several volumes on international organizations, trade, and development.

== Recognition ==
- Graduate, Australian Institute of Company Directors
- Fellow, Academy of Social Sciences (UK)
- Lifetime Fellow, Royal Society of Arts
- ISA Society for Women in International Political Economy Mentoring Award (2014)
- Johan Skytte Foundation Manuscript Award (2013)
