= European Association of Development Research and Training Institutes =

The European Association of Development Research and Training Institutes or EADI is the professional body for development studies and area studies in Europe. In 2010 it had about 300 members in 27 countries. It publishes a journal, the European Journal of Development Research, and every three years holds a general conference. Through the International Accreditation Council for Global Development Studies and Research it provides accreditation for Master's degree programmes; the council is a member of the International Network for Quality Assurance Agencies in Higher Education. The association receives funding from various sources including membership fees and core funding from the Federal Ministry for Economic Cooperation and Development of Germany. Members include the Institute for Housing and Urban Development Studies, the International Institute of Social Studies and the Nordic Africa Institute.

== History ==
The association was founded 1975 in Linz. It was originally based in Vienna, before moving to Tilburg (1982) and Geneva (1988). Since 2000, the secretariat has been located in Bonn, hosted by the German Development Institute, InWEnt and the Zentrum für Entwicklungsforschung. The Internationale Weiterbildung und Entwicklung GmbH (INWENT), the German Development Institute and the Center for Development Research (ZEF) jointly took over the patronage at the new seat of the association.
