= Development Studies Association =

UK scholarly society

- Abbreviation: DSA
- Formation: 1978; 48 years ago
- Type: Learned society
- Affiliations: EADI
- Website: www.devstud.org.uk

The Development Studies Association (DSA) is a scholarly society. It was formally established at the National Development Research Glasgow Conference in 1978 and currently has 35 institutional members (primarily UK University departments/research centres with some development organisations) and 400 individual and student members. It is governed by a Council made up of academics and practitioners working in international development elected at the Annual General Meeting.

The DSA aims to advance knowledge of the alternative processes and methods of socio-economic change, through supporting high quality research, teaching and practice in international development. Its strategic objectives are to:
i) Mobilise collective capacity and knowledge
ii) Nurture the next generation
iii) Invest in development infrastructure in the UK and beyond.

Two key activities are its annual conference and its study groups.

The DSA annual conference gathers together scholars, practitioners, policy makers and other commentators to focus upon major contemporary international development issues in the largest gathering in the UK of the development community.

DSA Study Groups facilitate interaction and networking within the development studies community and encourage the development of new ideas contributing to ongoing debates about development in the UK and Ireland. The study groups are sustained by active development studies professionals and usually meet at the Annual Conference and at specially convened meetings around the country.

== History ==
Tribe, Mike (2009) A Short History of the Development Studies Association, Journal of International Development, Volume 21, Issue 6 (p 732–741)

== Affiliations ==
The DSA is affiliated to the European Association of Development Research and Training Institutes (EADI).

== Related associations ==
- Developing Areas Research Group (DARG—within the Royal Geographical Society)
- British International Studies Association (BISA—within the Political Studies Association)
