= Development studies =

Interdisciplinary branch of social science

Development studies is an interdisciplinary branch of social science. Development studies is offered as a specialized master's degree at some reputable universities worldwide. It has grown in popularity as a subject of study since the early 1990s. It has been most widely taught and researched in developing countries and countries with a colonial history, such as the UK, where the discipline originated. Students of development studies often choose careers in international organisations such as the United Nations, World Bank, non-governmental organisations (NGOs), media and journalism houses, private sector development consultancy firms, corporate social responsibility (CSR) bodies and research centers.

== Professional bodies ==
Throughout the world, some professional bodies for development studies have been founded:

- Europe: European Association of Development Research and Training Institutes (EADI)
- Latin America: Consejo Latinoamericano de Ciencias Sociales (CLACSO)
- Asia: Asian Political and International Studies Association (APISA)
- Africa: Council for the Development of Social Science Research in Africa (CODESRIA) and Organization for Social Science Research in Eastern and Southern Africa (OSSREA)
- Arabic world: Arab Institutes and Centers for Economic and Social Development Research (AICARDES)

The common umbrella organization of these associations is the Inter-regional Coordinating Committee of Development Associations (ICCDA). In the UK and Ireland, the Development Studies Association is a major source of information for research on and studying in development studies. Its mission is to connect and promote those working on development research.

== Disciplines of development studies ==
Development issues include:

- Adult education
- Area studies
- Anthropology
- Community development
- Demography
- Development aid
- Development communication
- Development theory
- Development finance
- Diaspora studies
- Ecology
- Economic development
- Economic History
- Environmental studies
- Geography
- Gender studies
- Governance
- History of economic thought
- Human rights
- Human security
- Indigenous rights
- Industrial relations
- Industrialization
- International business
- International development
- International relations
- Journalism
- Media Studies
- Migration studies
- Partnership
- Peace and conflict studies
- Pedagogy
- Philosophy
- Political philosophy
- Population studies
- Postcolonialism
- Psychology
- Public administration
- Public health
- Rural development
- Queer studies
- Sociology
- Social policy
- Social development
- Social work
- Sustainable development
- Urban studies
- Women's studies

== History ==
The emergence of development studies as an academic discipline in the second half of the twentieth century is largely due to growing concern about the economic prospects of the third world after decolonization. In the immediate post-war period, development economics, a branch of economics, arose from earlier studies in colonial economics. By the 1960s, an increasing number of development economists felt that economics alone could not fully address issues such as political effectiveness and educational provision. Development studies arose as a result of this, initially aiming to integrate ideas of politics and economics. Since then, it has become an increasingly inter- and multi-disciplinary subject, encompassing a variety of social scientific fields. In recent years the use of political economy analysis- the application of the analytical techniques of economics- to try to assess and explain political and social factors that either enhance or limit development has become increasingly widespread as a way of explaining the success or failure of reform processes. The era of modern development is commonly deemed to have commenced with the inauguration speech of Harry S. Truman in 1949. In Point Four of his speech, with reference to Latin America and other poor nations, he said:

More than half the people of the world are living in conditions approaching misery. Their food is inadequate. They are victims of disease. Their economic life is primitive and stagnant. Their poverty is a handicap and a threat both to them and to more prosperous areas. For the first time in history, humanity possesses the knowledge and the skill to relieve the suffering of these people.

But development studies have also since taken an interest in the lessons from past development experiences in Western countries. More recently, the emergence of human security – a new, people-oriented approach to understanding and addressing global security threats – has led to a growing recognition of a relationship between security and development. Human security argues that inequalities and insecurity in one state or region have consequences for global security and that it is thus in the interest of all states to address underlying development issues. This relationship with studies of human security is but one example of the interdisciplinary nature of development studies.

Global Research cooperation between researchers from countries in the Global North and the Global South, so called North-south research partnerships, allow development studies to consider more diverse perspectives on development studies and other strongly value driven issues. Thus, it can contribute new findings to the field of research.

== See also ==
- Lee thesis
- Global South Development Magazine
- Colonization
- Postdevelopment theory
- Right to development
- World-systems theory
