= Großer Speicher =

Historic patrician courtyard in the north-western old town of Frankfurt am Main

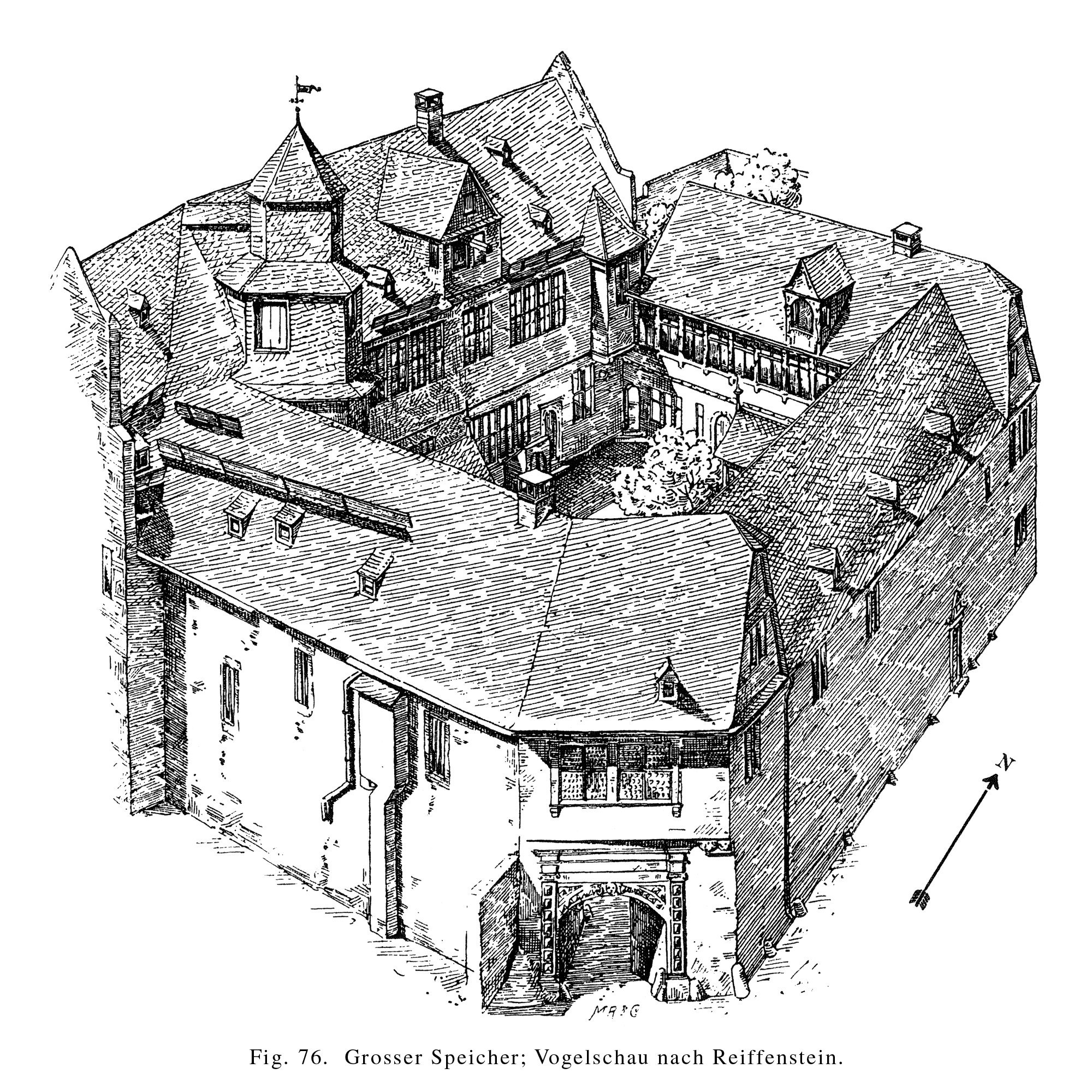
Bird's eye view of the large granary, 1853(Drawing by Julius Hülsen after Carl Theodor Reiffenstein, 1902)

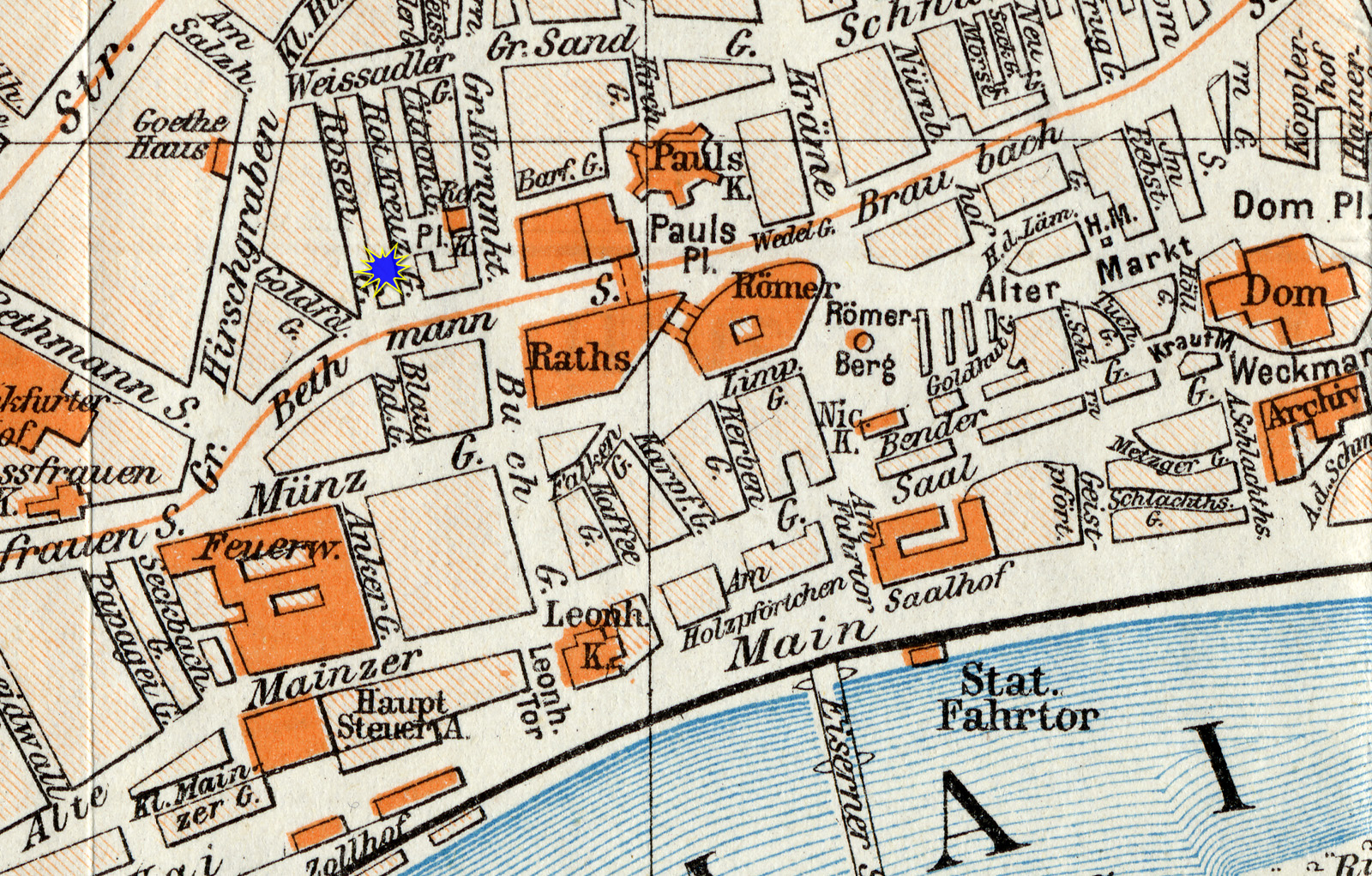
Position of the building in Frankfurt's old town(Chromolithograph, 1904)

The Großer Speicher was a historic patrician courtyard in the north-western old town of Frankfurt am Main. The houses, grouped around a roughly square inner courtyard, were located to the west on Rosengasse (from 1918 Schüppengasse) and to the east on Rotkreuzgasse, both of which are no longer existing parallel streets from and between Großer Hirschgraben and Kornmarkt. The north side with a walled garden and the south side facing Schüppengasse (from 1899 Bethmannstraße) were blocked by adjoining houses. The last house address was Schüppengasse 2 or Rotkreuzgasse 1.

At the end of the 16th century, a Dutch immigrant rebuilt the courtyard complex, which can only vaguely be dated to the Gothic period, in High Renaissance style. It was thus the earliest documented civic building in the city to adopt this style and underwent hardly any alterations over the centuries. Shortly before the resulting significance of the Grosser Speicher for Frankfurt's art history became known to a wider public in the 19th century, extensive late classicist alterations destroyed large parts of the building's original state.

As part of the redevelopment of the old town in the 1930s, the few surviving remains of the courtyard were carefully demolished so that it could later be rebuilt elsewhere, which did not happen due to the war. Today, the former Federal Audit Office, which was built in the immediate post-war period, is located on the former site of the building. Most of the stored parts have survived to this day in municipal depots.

== History ==
=== Etymology, sources and topographical classification ===
The term “Großer Speicher” obviously dates back to the 18th century. The sources do not even refer to it as a granary before the 16th century; prior to that, it is usually referred to as a “Hof”. The attribute added to the house name was introduced to differentiate it from two nearby houses, whose older names were also only replaced in the 18th century by the names Mittlerer Speicher (Schüppengasse 2 / Bethmannstraße 16) and Kleiner Speicher (Schüppengasse 4 / Bethmannstraße 18). What the word Speicher refers to remains unclear. Since medieval house names, in the absence of a system of house numbers, usually used special features of a house or its owner to distinguish it from other buildings, it can only be speculated that the courtyard, possibly after a conversion, was distinguished by a particularly peculiar granary in the sense of a storage facility.

Considering its significance for the history of the town, comparatively little is known about the history of the building. In contrast to other important monuments in the city, such as the Golden Scales at the cathedral or the Salt House on the Römerberg, there is no surviving history of ownership that can be traced back to modern times. Furthermore, many documents that could possibly shed light on this today, in particular the master builder's books from the imperial city period, were lost when the Frankfurt city archives were destroyed at the beginning of 1944.

A relatively extensive monograph from 1902 exists, but it mainly deals with the architecture of the building - which had already changed considerably by then - and has also preserved important building photographs in printed form. For (then) earlier periods, it often draws on the only source that describes the building in its approximate state at the time of construction, namely the texts and pictures by the Frankfurt painter Carl Theodor Reiffenstein. They meticulously document the changes to the city from his earliest childhood memories from 1824 until shortly before his death in 1893, around 1885.

On the other hand, the fact that the monograph was co-authored by the then head of the town archives, Rudolf Jung, initially suggests that there was only a small amount of material available anyway - after all, he had unrestricted access to the huge archive holdings at the time for his work (see, however, Reception in the 19th century). Finally, the sketchbooks created for Treuner's model of the old town in the 1930s, which are preserved in the Historical Museum, provide a picture of the purely external state of the complex shortly before its demolition.

Despite the lack of sources, it is possible to determine relatively precisely how far back the history of the Great Warehouse may have gone. The city historian and topographer Johann Georg Battonn commented on Rotkreuzgasse at the beginning of the 19th century:

Almost at the end of the alley, where the large granary stands, is the underground canal or the large andaue, over which, as long as it was still open, there was a wooden bridge.

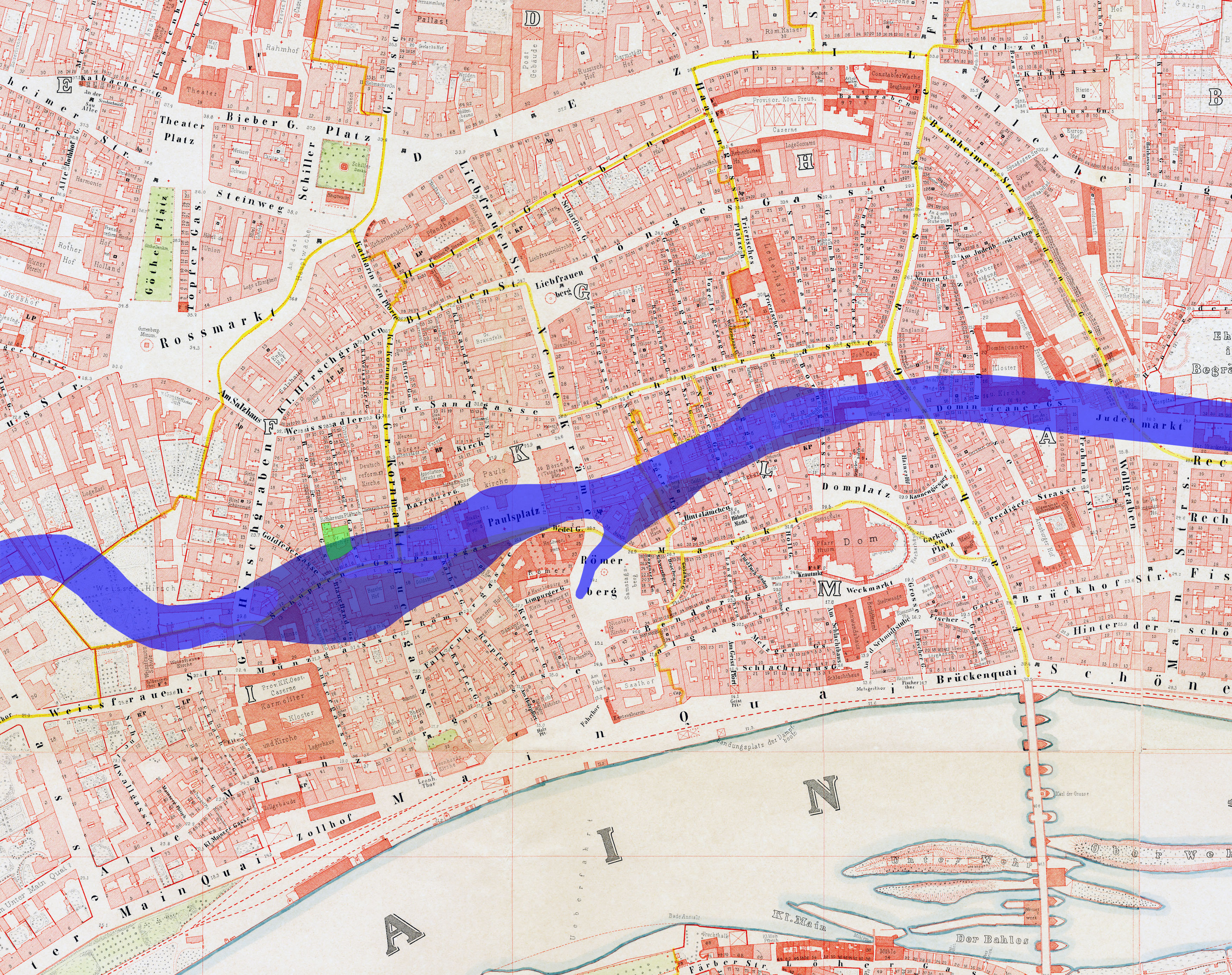
Course of the Braubach in the old town area (chromolithograph by Friedrich August Ravenstein from 1862 with overlay after Karl Nahrgang)

The “Andaue”, or Antauche, formerly also known as Schüppe, was nothing other than the Braubach, a tributary of the Main that had already silted up in the first Christian millennium and roughly followed today's street of the same name in the old town area. From today's Paulsplatz, it ran along the Schüppengasse named after it - Bethmannstraße since it was widened on the south side in 1899. It served as a natural moat for the first city wall directly to the south, which was probably built in the 10th century. In the Hohenstaufen period, the town developed beyond these boundaries from the 12th century and was surrounded by another town wall, the Staufenmauer, the remains of which can still be seen today, by 1200 at the latest.

After the construction of the Staufenmauer, the former moat of the first fortification no longer had any military significance and could now be used as an inner-city canal for both economic purposes and to drain waste water. For this reason, the white tanners with their foul-smelling businesses settled along the Schüppengasse. The fact that the entire area between Grosser Kornmarkt, the later Grosser Hirschgraben, Schüppengasse and Weissadlergasse was referred to as “valle rosarum” or “Rosental” in the 14th and 15th centuries, first documented in 1307.

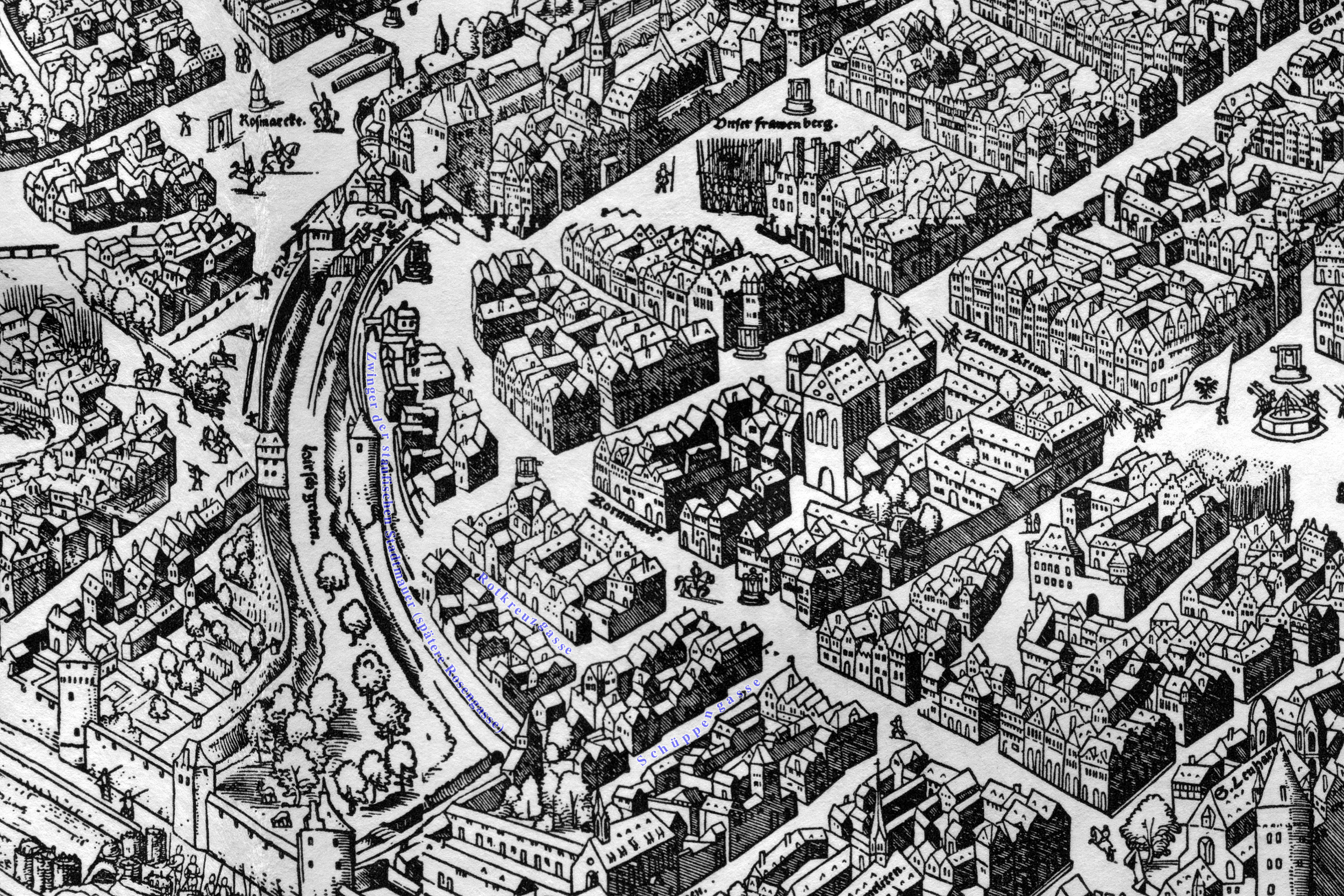
The north-western old town, 1552(woodcut by Conrad Faber von Kreuznach)

The Rosental was cut through by two streets, the aforementioned Rotkreuzgasse to the east and Rosengasse to the west. It was not until the end of the 16th century that the Staufenmauer in this area, which had become pointless due to subsequent fortifications, was demolished and the moat in front of it, the Hirschgraben, was filled in and transformed into the street of the same name. Until then, Rosengasse had been the kennel of the Hohenstaufen wall, which was described by Baldemar von Petterweil in 1350 as “hic proximus muro opidi”. This condition can still be clearly seen on the siege plan of the city from 1552, despite the fact that the streets in the area are only very vaguely marked. It was not until 1918 that it was given the name of Schüppengasse, which had disappeared in 1899, and the name of Rosengasse disappeared.

Rotkreuzgasse, which was called Dietrichsgasse until the 17th century, was also mentioned in Petterweil's records. Battonn suspected that the courtyard of the eponymous court messenger Dietrich, mentioned there as early as 1273, was a predecessor of the Great Granary, without, however, providing any evidence in his documentary excerpt that it was actually a building on this exact spot. Regardless of this, the division of the Rosental into cross streets, which determined the later parcelling out of the land, can already be traced back to the first half of the 14th century.

=== Previous history ===
On the southern edge of the Rosental valley, a predecessor building to the later Great Granary was probably first erected in the 14th century, based purely on the development history of the Niederstadt described above. However, the earliest written sources referring to the building only date from the beginning of the 15th century. In 1412, a rent book described income from a “farm with garden” owned by a Lutz zum Wedel. The bridge over the still open moat was also explicitly mentioned.

According to older literature, which does not provide any source evidence, the building was already owned by the family in the 14th century. There is an entry in the register of houses from 1433 to 1438 which shows it as being owned by Heinrich Weiss zum Wedel. This proves that the estate was passed down through several generations of the well-known Frankfurt patrician family in the 15th century, although it can no longer be traced in its original form.

Meanwhile, it is not possible to attribute it to a builder, although the construction of a courtyard complex of this size could only have been undertaken by someone from the ranks of the city nobility or patriciate, to which the Wedel family clearly belonged. At the end of the 15th or beginning of the 16th century, the buildings must have come into the possession of the Knoblauch patrician family, who were no less deserving of the city, through sale or family connections, which were common among the families of the city's upper class. However, this entry from 1509 about payments made by Siegfried Knoblauch as the owner of a garden belonging to the courtyard means that the written evidence about the predecessor building is already exhausted.

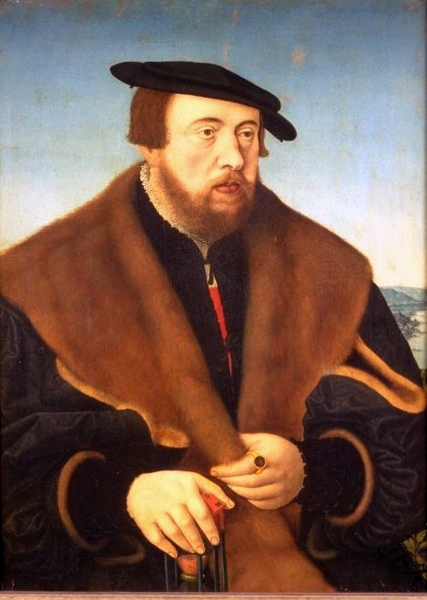
Johann von Glauburg, 1545(Oil painting on wood by Conrad Faber von Kreuznach)

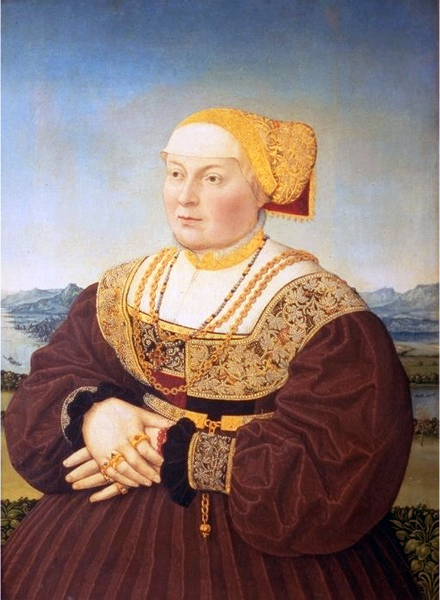
Johann von Glauburg's wife, Anne Knoblauch, 1545(oil painting on wood by Conrad Faber von Kreuznach)

Around 1540, the family must have converted or rebuilt the farm, although the extent of this is unknown. The only indication of this was the date 1542 on the gable of the half-timbered upper floor of the north building on Rotkreuzgasse. There is no documentary evidence of building activity on the Great Granary until 1550. Despite the good reproduction of the town's topography, the building itself cannot be recognized with certainty on the siege plan of the town from 1552, in contrast to Matthäus Merian's plan from 1628.

Seventy merchants and 30 goldsmiths from Antwerp alone settled in Frankfurt at once; by 1589 there were almost a thousand, and by the middle of the following decade there were almost as many again. Initially, they lived wherever they could find space, and thus spread out all over the city. However, as they neither found nor were given space to practice the trades and crafts they had imported, they gradually moved to the western part of Niederstadt, where there was still plenty of free building land and where the Weißfrauenkirche, which had initially been left to them, was also located.

The district formed by Alte Mainzer Gasse, Schüppengasse, Grosser Kornmarkt, Grosser Hirschgraben and Roßmarkt became their preferred quarter. In the former Rosental, where a house directory in 1509 had counted just 20 houses and the courtyard with garden, the building density was now similar to that of the rest of the old town center.

=== Acquisition by Franz de le Boë ===
Among the “Walhaz” immigrants was the silk dyer and silk manufacturer Franz de le Boë from Lille in the French-speaking part of Flanders, which had belonged to the Spanish Netherlands since 1555 and is now part of French territory. On October 16, 1585, he bought the farm and garden from the Glauburg heirs for 2,200 guilders. Apparently, Johann von Glauburg's descendants were also sympathetic to the immigrants, as elsewhere the patricians, whose fortunes were invested in land and real estate throughout the city, made a fortune in those times of housing shortages. Prices exploded and soon exceeded an unprecedented 10,000 guilders for a single house.

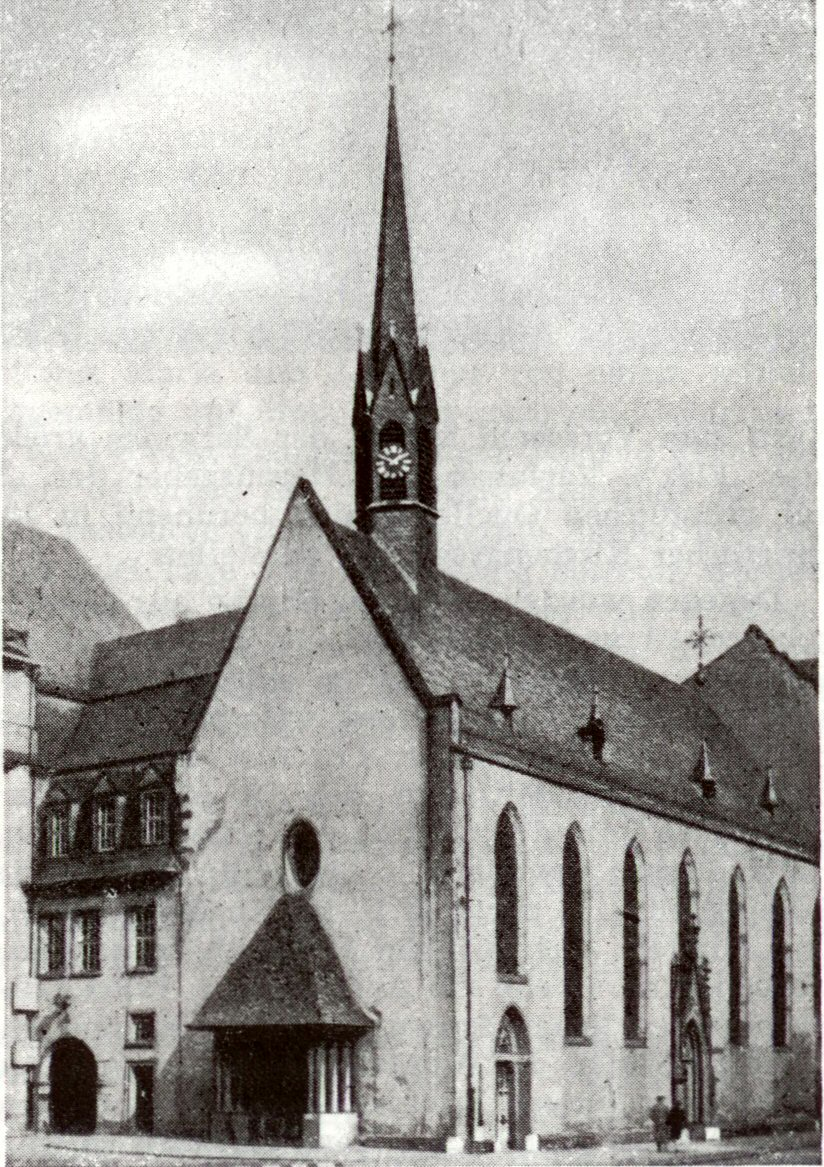
Weißfrauenkirche, around 1900

The new owner of the Great Granary had it redesigned between 1587 and 1590 according to his ideas of a mature Renaissance, which still differed markedly from those of the citizens of the conservative imperial city. Meanwhile, the political situation developed to the disadvantage of the immigrants. After the appointment of Cassiodorus Reinius, a second French-Lutheran preacher, had been approved in 1593, the council forbade the appointment of another clergyman. This was undoubtedly due to fears that the granting of ecclesiastical equality could also result in political equality and thus seriously endanger the patrician rule over the city.

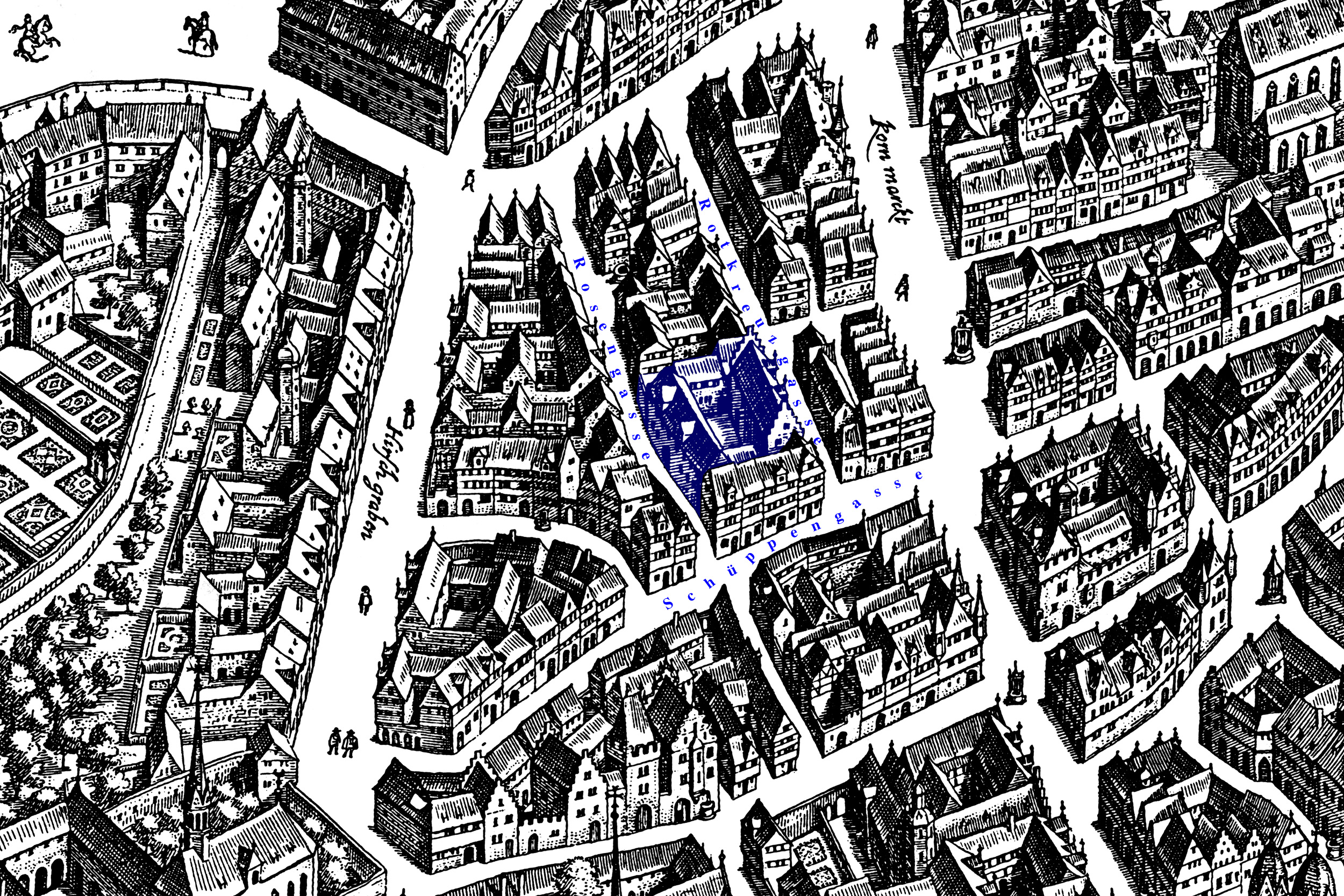
Großer Speicher in the north-western part of the old town, 1628(copperplate engraving by Matthäus Merian the Elder)

When the council finally terminated the lease on the house Zur großen Einung on Seckbächer Gasse, which was used for church services, in 1596, the Reformed had had enough. Under the leadership of Anton de Ligne, who was a cousin of the early deceased Noe du Fay and brother-in-law of René Mathie, they entered into negotiations with the count's government in Hanau. These were successfully concluded on June 1, 1597, by a treaty with Count Philipp Ludwig II, which granted them extensive communal and ecclesiastical autonomy in the new Hanau town to be founded, following the example of Frankenthal.

For Frankfurt, the emigration of more than half of the newcomers, i.e. more than a thousand people, was a severe blow. This can be seen from the fact that of the 47 Walloon fathers who settled in Hanau in 1600, no fewer than 32, and of the 47 Flemish fathers, 10, i.e. almost half in total, had previously been well-known Frankfurt merchants. Among them were Franz de le Boë and his son-in-law David le Conte; almost all the immigrants from Valenciennes, Tournai, Mons and Lille had left the city.

Apparently, many nevertheless kept their land and houses in the city, as it remained the main market for the goods produced in Hanau Neustadt, not to mention the twice-yearly Frankfurt trade fair. This is the only way to explain why, after the death of her husband in 1604, the widow de le Boë was able to sell on the Great Granary for 5,000 guilders to Mr. and Mrs. Godin, who, judging by their name, were also reformed refugees. After the change of ownership to the Godin family, the history of the Great Granary disappears into obscurity for centuries. It is only briefly illuminated by a record from the municipal curator's office from 1766, according to which the Großer Speicher was owned by the brewer Nikolaus Peter Dillenburger in 1741.

=== Rediscovery and reception in the 19th century ===
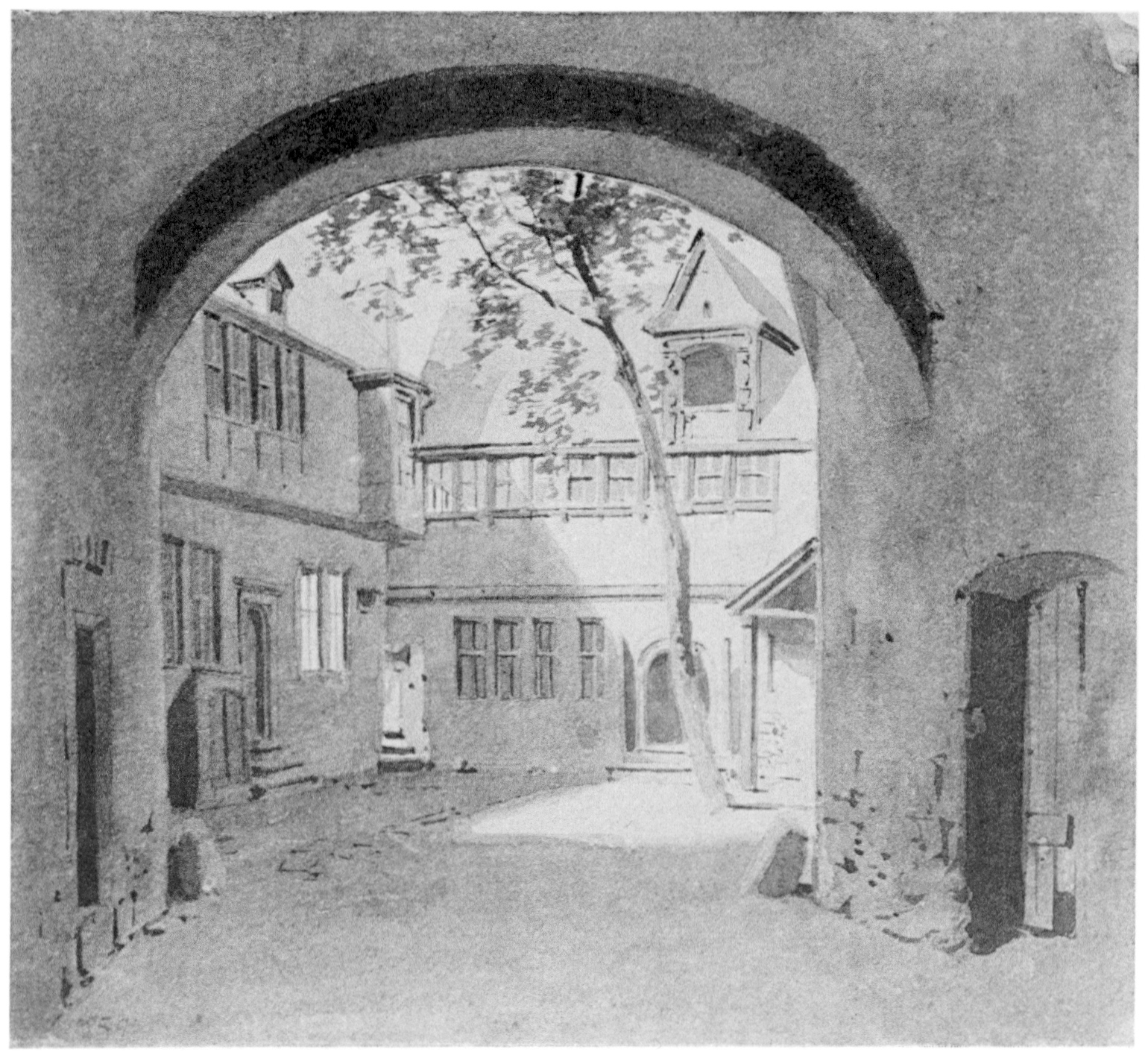
View of the courtyard from the entrance gate, 1859(collotype of a watercolor by Carl Theodor Reiffenstein, 1897)

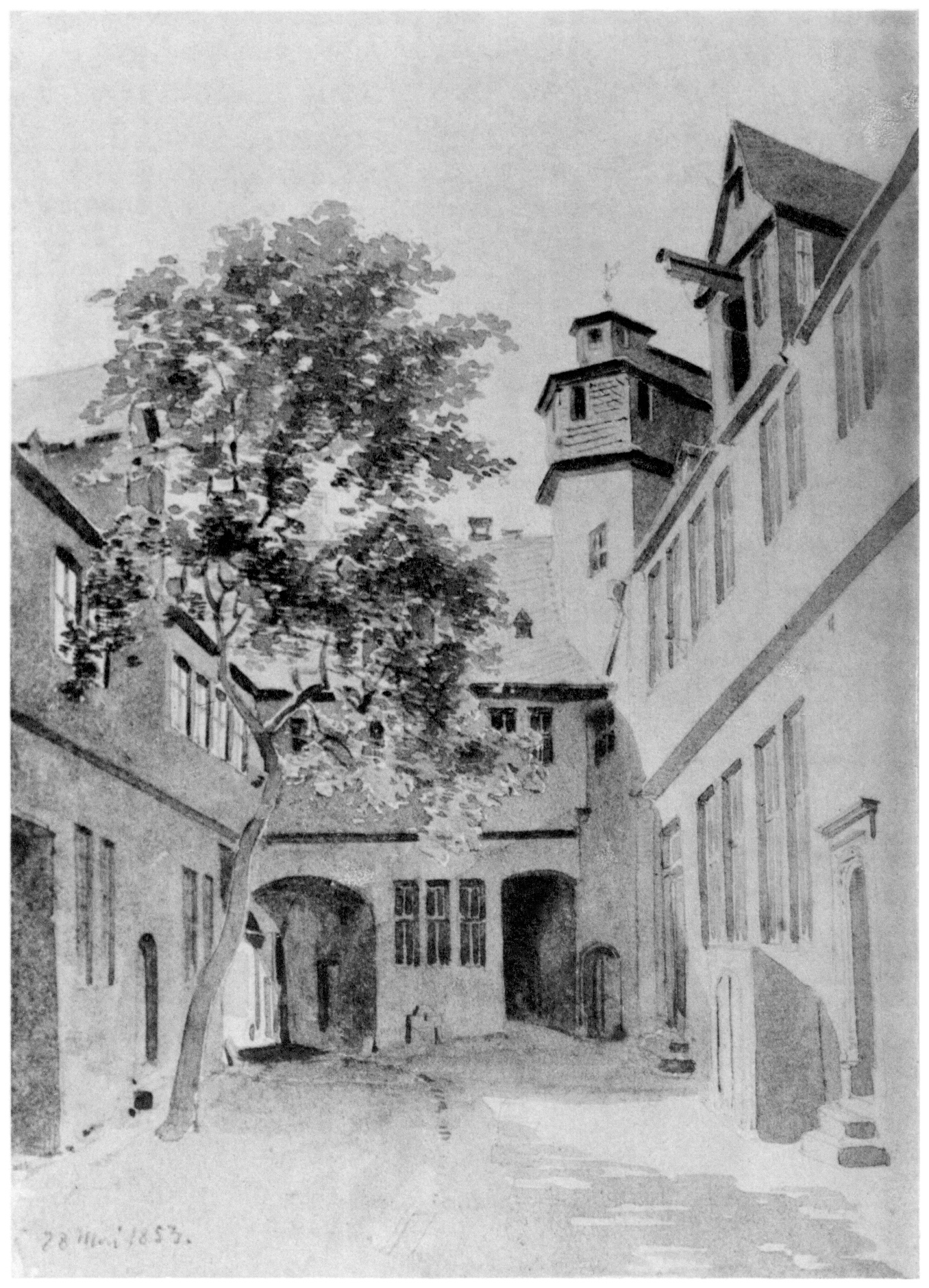
Courtyard view of the entrance gate, 1853(collotype of a watercolor by Carl Theodor Reiffenstein, 1897)

At the beginning of the 19th century, Frankfurt's Old Town fell into a deep slumber as a result of the creation of new, neoclassical districts outside the city gates, the enormous loss of importance of the Old Town area due to the discontinuation of election and coronation ceremonies with the end of the Holy Roman Empire and, finally, the slow decline of the classical fair business. The vast majority of the former patrician houses now passed into bourgeois hands. As a result of industrialization, the population rose sharply from the second third of the 19th century onwards and the crafts traditionally based there sank into insignificance, large parts of the old town became a poor quarter where often more than ten households lived in a building that had originally been planned and built for one family. This also affected the area around Schüppengasse, which once again fell into disrepute as a street prostitute.

Around 1850, the Großer Speicher was owned by the brewer J. J. Jung. In order to establish a brewery with a restaurant and bowling alley, he had the historic interior heavily altered between 1858 and 1863 and had three of the four courtyard wings significantly extended, which had a lasting impact on the appearance of the building. As late as 1853, Carl Theodor Reiffenstein, who meticulously documented and drew the transformation of Frankfurt's old town and its surroundings in the 19th century, characterized it as follows:

On May 29, 1853 [...] I came to the Haus zum Speicher for the first time by chance on one of my archaeological hikes. As it was still almost completely untouched and unchanged at the time, the impression it made on me must naturally have been all the greater. It was only surpassed by the feeling of astonishment that I felt at the same time that this jewel could lie so completely unnoticed and unrecognized in the middle of a town that has had a society for history and antiquities for more than fifteen years, has public art institutions, and a lot of people who pride themselves not a little on their knowledge of old architecture and building remains. I do not believe that a more complete picture of a house and courtyard from the second half of the 16th century can be found here, as the wealth and affluence of the inhabitants means that most older houses are usually immediately rebuilt, altered or, in the worst case, robbed of their ancient outer garb when minor damage begins.

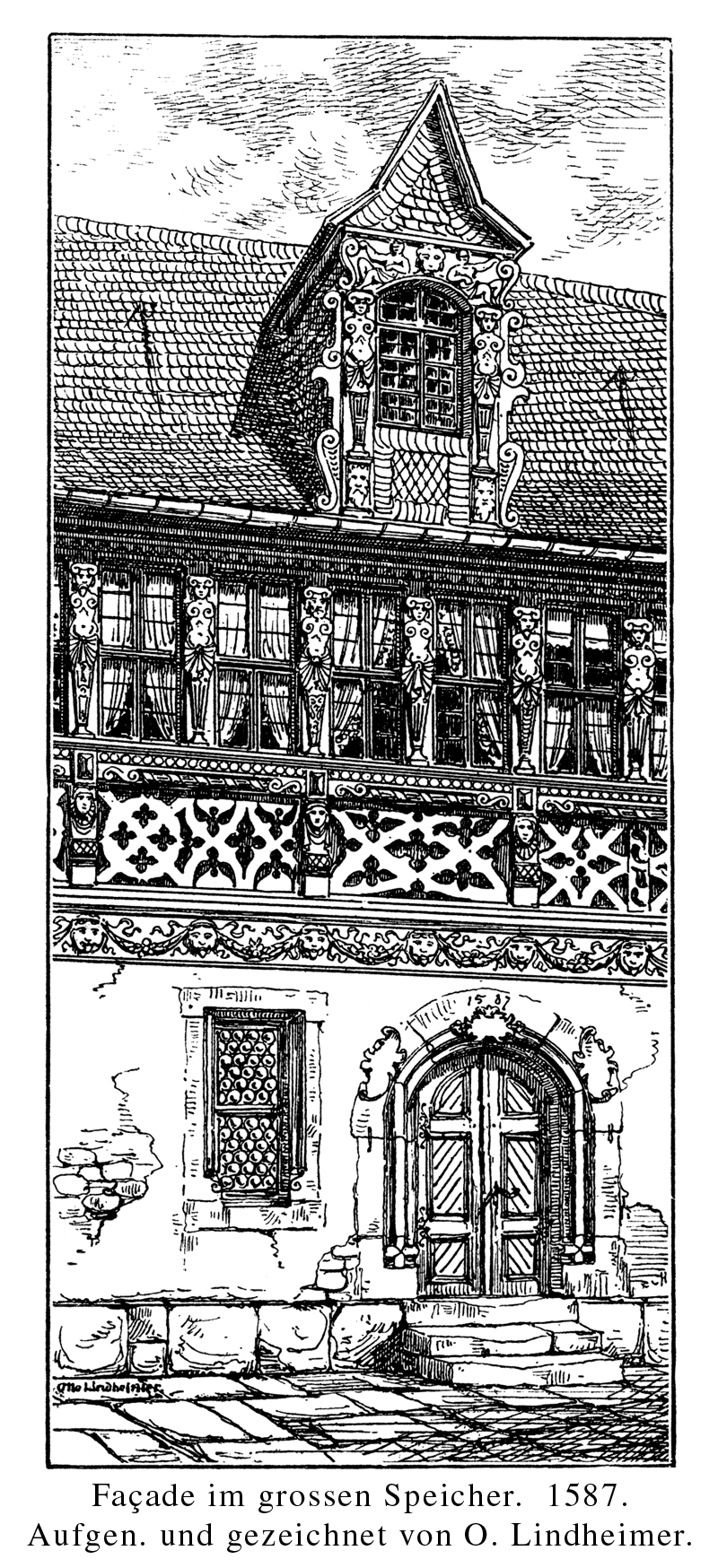
Partial view of the façade of the north building, around 1880(drawing by Otto Lindheimer)

Reiffenstein's description can be seen as the beginning of the modern reception of the courtyard complex, although at the time of his description the entire rich facades were still covered in plaster, which had been brought about by fire protection regulations and the neoclassical aspirations of the 18th century. It was not until 1880 that the architect Otto Lindheimer removed the cladding on behalf of the then owner H. S. Langenbach, so that the entire magnificent carved decoration was once again visible. In 1886, Lindheimer included it among the few important Renaissance buildings in Frankfurt in his first major work on Frankfurt's architectural history, Frankfurt am Main und seine Bauten.

In the 1891 publication Denkmäler Deutscher Renaissance, the building was listed alongside the Salzhaus on Römerberg as the only Frankfurt town house. The first edition of Dehio's Handbook of German Art Monuments in 1905, which was very poor in private buildings, also explicitly mentioned the Großer Speicher.

However, in the enthusiasm of the imperial era for the newly discovered “German Renaissance”, the fact that the Grosser Speicher, like all the city's above-average splendid civic buildings, had not been built by locals, but by immigrants, was taboo for a long time. Even the monograph in the standard work on the history of Frankfurt's bourgeois architecture, Die Baudenkmäler in Frankfurt am Main, published in 1902-1914 and still authoritative today, refused to attribute the building to de le Boë.

As with the Goldene Waage, where the work glossed over historical details in a way that can only be assumed to be intentional and concealed the origin of the builder from Tournai, it also only spoke of “the heyday of the German Renaissance” and the “solid artistic sense of the wealthy bourgeoisie”, which gave rise to buildings such as the Grosser Speicher. As the work was co-authored by the then head of the city archives, who had access to all the sources, it is difficult to imagine that the true clients were actually unknown.

It was not until 1921 that the Frankfurt lawyer and historian Alexander Dietz made the correct attribution in his Frankfurter Handelsgeschichte, although he continued - objectively incorrectly - to defend the local Frankfurt builders:

Frankfurt has not become a center of art due to the wealthy foreigners and has often been underestimated due to the lack of visible mementos of its otherwise proud merchants. The much-maligned medieval patricians were far superior in their artistic sense to the sober moneyed people of more recent times. Even the occasional Belgian artists and artistic buildings cannot change this fact.

=== Decline, old town redevelopment and the current situation ===
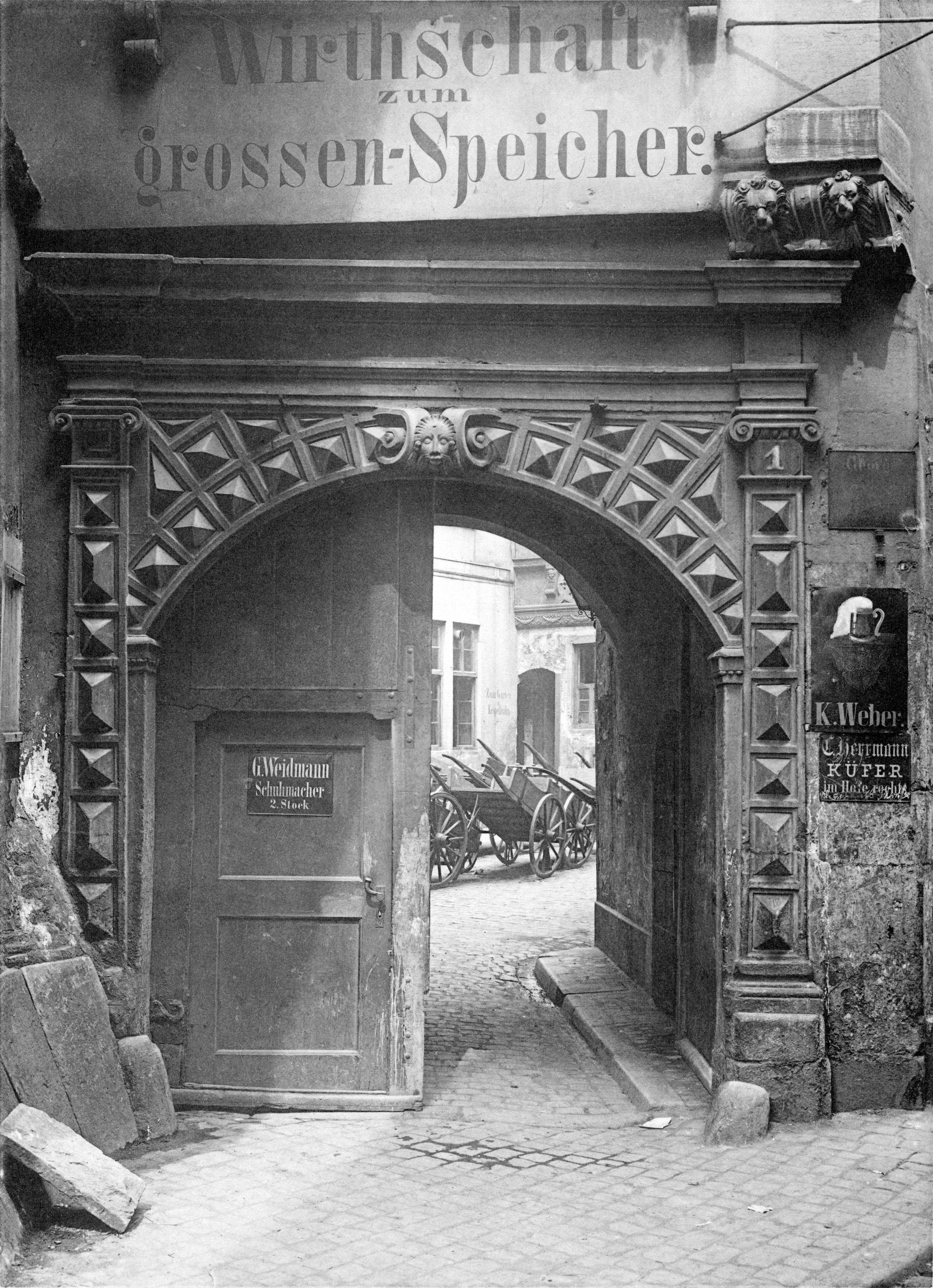
Main portal on Rotkreuzgasse with inn sign, 1901(photograph by Carl Friedrich Fay)

After the First World War, the business in the Großer Speicher went out of business - permission to use it as a brewery had already been withdrawn in 1879 - and the buildings continued to fall into disrepair. Address books report on various simple craft businesses that were based there in the interwar years, but were hardly commensurate with the still great importance of the farm complex.

A supposedly new heyday began in 1935, when an innkeeper was given permission to set up an Altdeutsche Bierstube in the Großer Speicher. At the same time as the old town, which was exceptionally well preserved even by national standards, was being discovered by tourists, plans were already underway for its extensive renovation, which was supported by the state in many large cities in National Socialist Germany under the heading of “Altstadtgesundung” (Old Town Health).

However, in the rarest of cases, this was what is understood today as restoration in the sense of monument preservation. Basically, the treatment of the old building fabric had hardly developed since the street demolitions of the imperial era - the plans therefore mostly referred to so-called clearances, i.e. the total demolition of entire streets to make way for either wider access roads, parking lots or adapted new buildings.

Block XVII of the Old Town Health Plan presented in 1936 after a previous architectural competition concerned the area of the Great Warehouse, literally:

Complete clearance of the building blocks located between Hirschgraben, Weißadlergasse, Gr. Kornmarkt, and Bethmannstraße and new development, with improvement of the connecting streets leading into the old town. This area is among the worst structurally in the old town. Prostitution has spread there. Such a district can no longer be tolerated in the heart of the city.

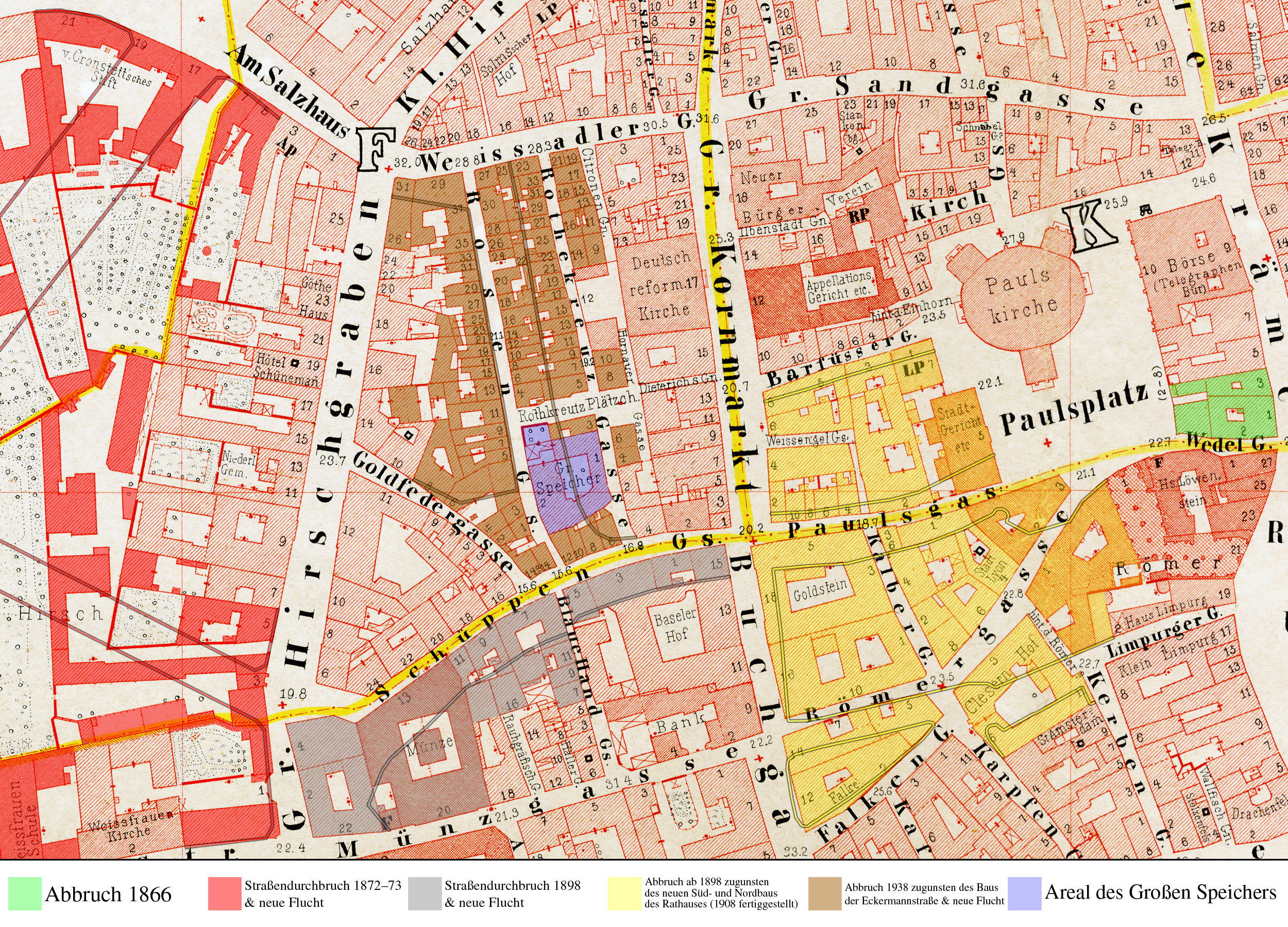
Abandonments and road breakthroughs around the Großer Speicher in the 19th and 20th centuries (chromolithograph by Friedrich August Ravenstein from 1862 with additions from a plan from 1944)

Outside of official municipal correspondence, the 16-meter-wide Eckermannstraße planned to replace the area was promoted as a "new access road to the Main," thus publicly presenting the "renewal through demolition" in a different light. The Große Speicher and Haus Heydentanz, a building constructed during the heyday of the Middle Rhine half-timbered style south of it, were already under monument protection at that time. The value of the approximately 70 other houses affected by the measure, as a largely unchanged ensemble from the period primarily before 1750, was also known, as the Frankfurter General-Anzeiger noted in an article on November 5, 1937. At the same time, it was soberly stated:

Thus, the ancient houses on Bethmannstraße must also fall victim to traffic. These are primarily the houses "Zum großen Speicher" and the beautiful half-timbered house "Zum Heydentanz," which cannot be preserved despite all efforts.

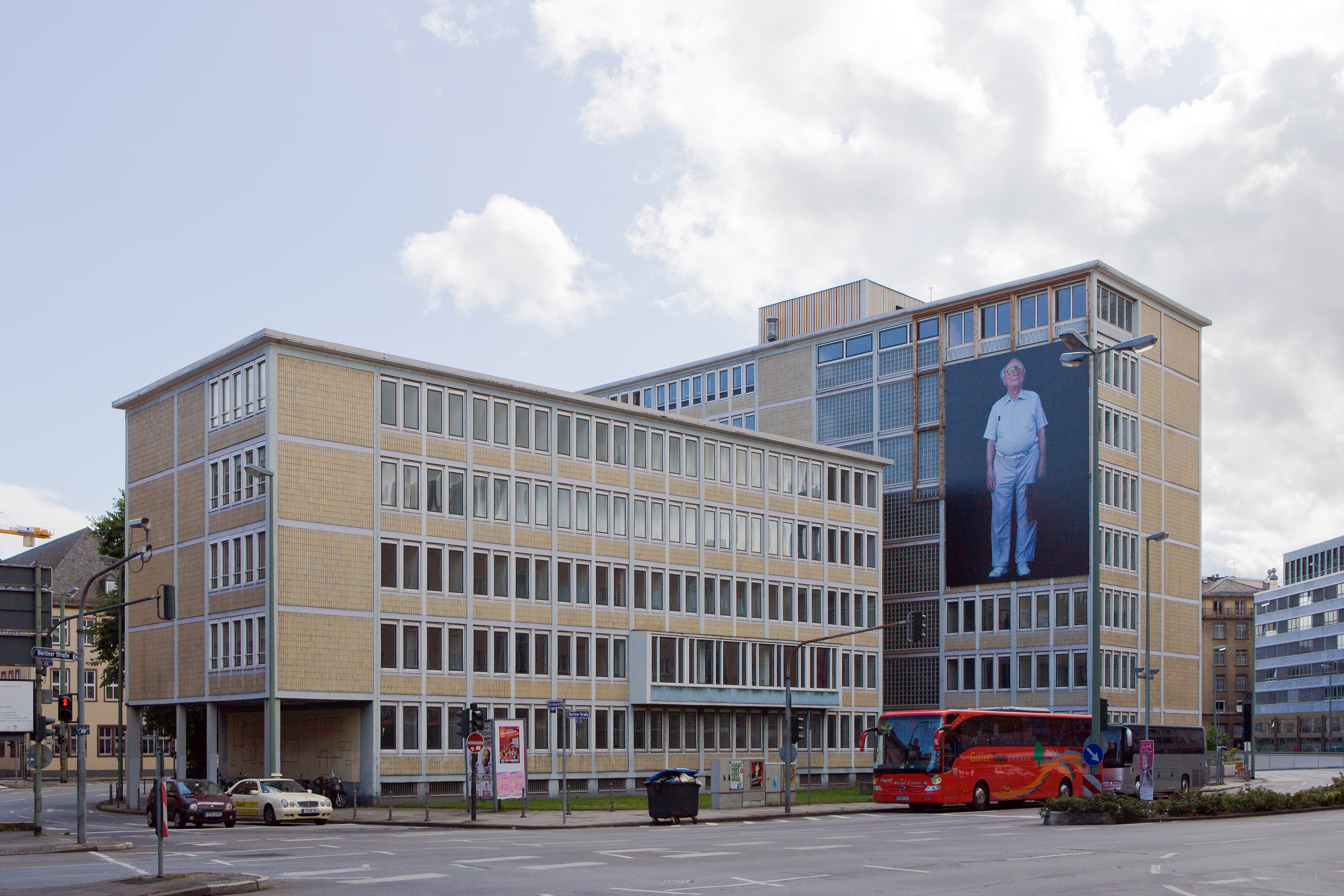
The Federal Audit Office standing on the former site of the Great Warehouse, July 2009

During the bombing raids of March 1944, which destroyed the entire Frankfurt old town along with all the new buildings on Eckermannstraße, the stone remnants of the Große Speicher in storage were also destroyed, only the wooden parts of the facade remained spared due to relocation. After the war, from 1954 to 1955, the Bundesrechnungshof (Federal Court of Audit) was built on the former site of the Große Speicher by architects F. Steinmeyer and W. Dierschke in forms that were out of scale for the old town.

Since the departure of the authority in 2000, the building has stood empty. Reuse or even new buildings on the site have so far failed due to its status as a protected monument. Also, the original street network at this location has completely disappeared due to the creation of the horizontal Berliner Straße in the spirit of a car-friendly city. The formerly planned reconstruction area of the Große Speicher south of the cathedral is now overlaid with large-scale residential buildings from the 1950s, which equally negate the original parceling and street structures.

In 2008, on the occasion of the planned reconstruction of some significant Frankfurt bourgeois houses on the site of the Technical Town Hall, which was demolished from 2010 onwards, the documentation "Spolien der Frankfurter Altstadt" (Spoils of the Frankfurt Old Town) was published. It presents for the first time photographs of the facade parts of the building that have been preserved in municipal depots to this day. They all come from the half-timbered part of the north building, six out of eleven herms, parts of the breast rail, a console, and all the carved parts of the dormer are still present, estimated to be about 60% of the sculpturally worked original substance. Since much was similarly designed, it is assumed that the removed parts were deliberately chosen in 1938 to enable later carving of the remaining parts in a reconstruction based on photographs and analogies. This would still be theoretically possible today, as good surveys and photographs of the north building also survived the war.

== Architecture ==
=== North wing ===
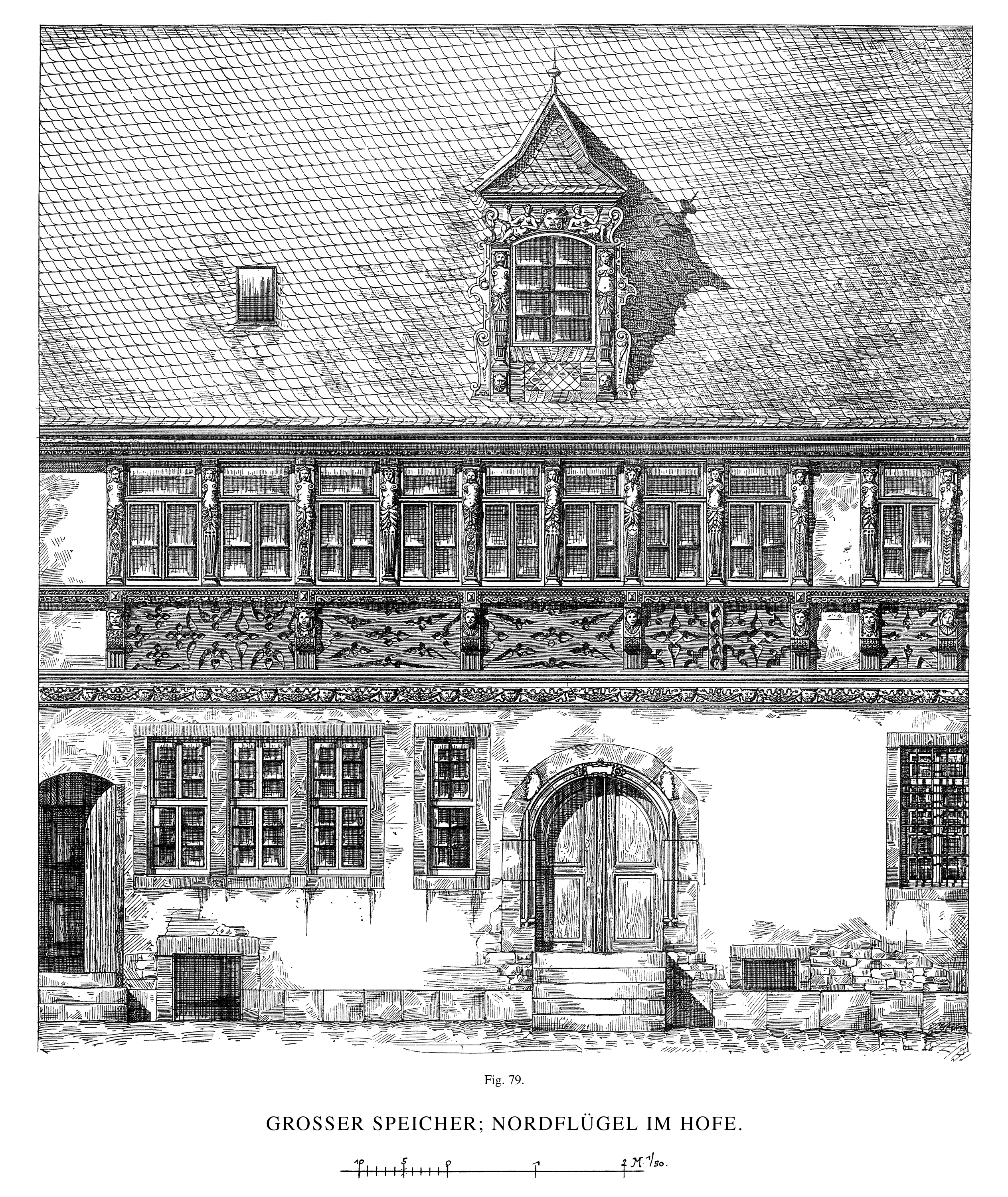
Courtyard façade of the north building, 1902(drawing by Julius Hülsen)

A notable feature of the timber-framed upper floor was the pronounced protrusion of all elements compared to the ground floor wall, emphasizing its already very plastic effect. A group of eight grouped and one single rectangular window was framed by the richest carving ornamentation that any timber-framed building in Frankfurt, besides the Salzhaus, could boast. The breast rail below the windows, adorned with band ornamentation and a rod-shaped leaf scroll, did not pass through but was clamped between the individual window mullions, each ending with a lying volute. The lintel displayed a continuous egg and dart motif. Below the breast rail, the window mullions were worked as scaled consoles with an overlying and upwardly projecting mask; beyond the railing, they were elaborated as delicate herm figures. According to older illustrations, each mask and herm figure was individually designed, suggesting a possible, albeit no longer traceable, iconographic program. The Frankfurt art historian Fried Lübbecke assumed that these were portraits of the builder, his family members, and the household staff.

=== South wing ===
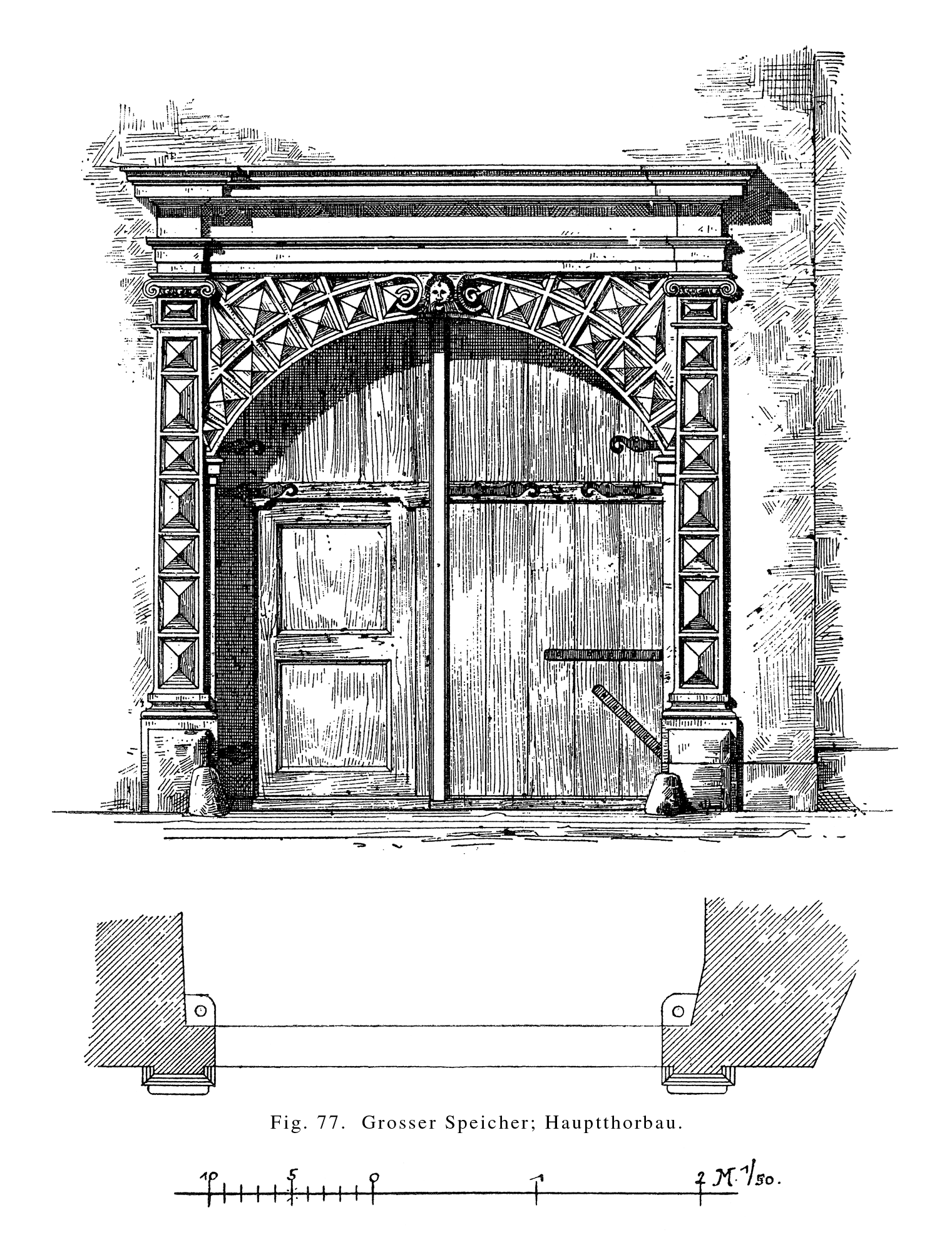
Portal of the south building on Rotkreuzgasse, 1902(drawing by Julius Hülsen)

At the south wing, which was separated from the adjoining and significantly taller House Heydentanz to the south by a narrow and inaccessible eaves passage of less than a meter, there were three original, narrow rectangular windows on the first floor of the exterior facade. Beyond the wall that obstructed the eaves passage, the south wing bent northward about the last fifth of its eastern course, so that this part was also visible from Schüppengasse or later Bethmannstraße. On the ground floor of this part, diagonally located between the south and north wings, there was a passage to the courtyard spanned by an irregular groin vault.

The design of the round-arched closed gate of the passage testified to the representative claim of the builder. To the left and right of the portal, Ionic pilasters tapering upwards formed the support for a scrolled Ionic entablature consisting of architrave, frieze, and cornice. The lintel below rested on two small internal pillars with an architrave as a capital. In the middle of the lintel, two volutes developed from the diamond blocks carved there as well as in the external pilasters, between which a male mask protruded. The gate itself still had remnants of the original fittings with hook-shaped ends.

The courtyard side of the south wing was kept simple. On the ground floor, in the west, there was an entrance portal with a flat segmental arch, between which a group of three probably still original rectangular windows was placed in the narrow remaining wall. The timber-framed upper floor, overhanging at a sharp angle from west to north similar to the street side, had five neoclassical rectangular windows. The original condition, presumably destroyed sometime in the early 19th century, cannot be reconstructed.

=== West wing ===
While the north wing represented the prestigious part of the building, the west wing located on Rosengasse was the actual main building. Unlike the east wing, it did not align flush with the gable sides of the north and south wings but was slightly set back from them. Thus, the northern gable wall formed freely towards the adjoining garden by a firewall. To the south, directly adjacent to another firewall, stood the house on Schüppengasse or later Bethmannstraße, which no longer belonged to the Great Warehouse.

The appearance of the street facade on Rosengasse before its alteration in 1863 is not documented but likely consisted of purely functional forms and rectangular windows of the type otherwise found on the house, as there was historically never an entrance there. The north side facing the garden had six original rectangular windows grouped together on the ground floor and two individual ones on the upper floor.

=== Inside ===
Analogous to the cellar, the ground floor of the North Wing was vaulted with a barrel vault. It had two rooms, one occupying about two-thirds of the width of the house west of the main portal, the other the remaining space east of it. The interior division was marked by a wall perpendicular to the courtyard front, with a round-arched portal. The access to the externally magnificent upper floor, which had the same layout as the ground floor, is not documented. Given the lack of descriptions, little of the originally elaborate furnishings likely survived by the mid-19th century. The double window facing the garden in the western gable wall had a profiled molding with round bars inside, which ran against a base with volute consoles at the dividing mullion. In the north wall, there was also a wooden wall cabinet with hook-shaped fittings similar to those of the main portal on Rotkreuzgasse.

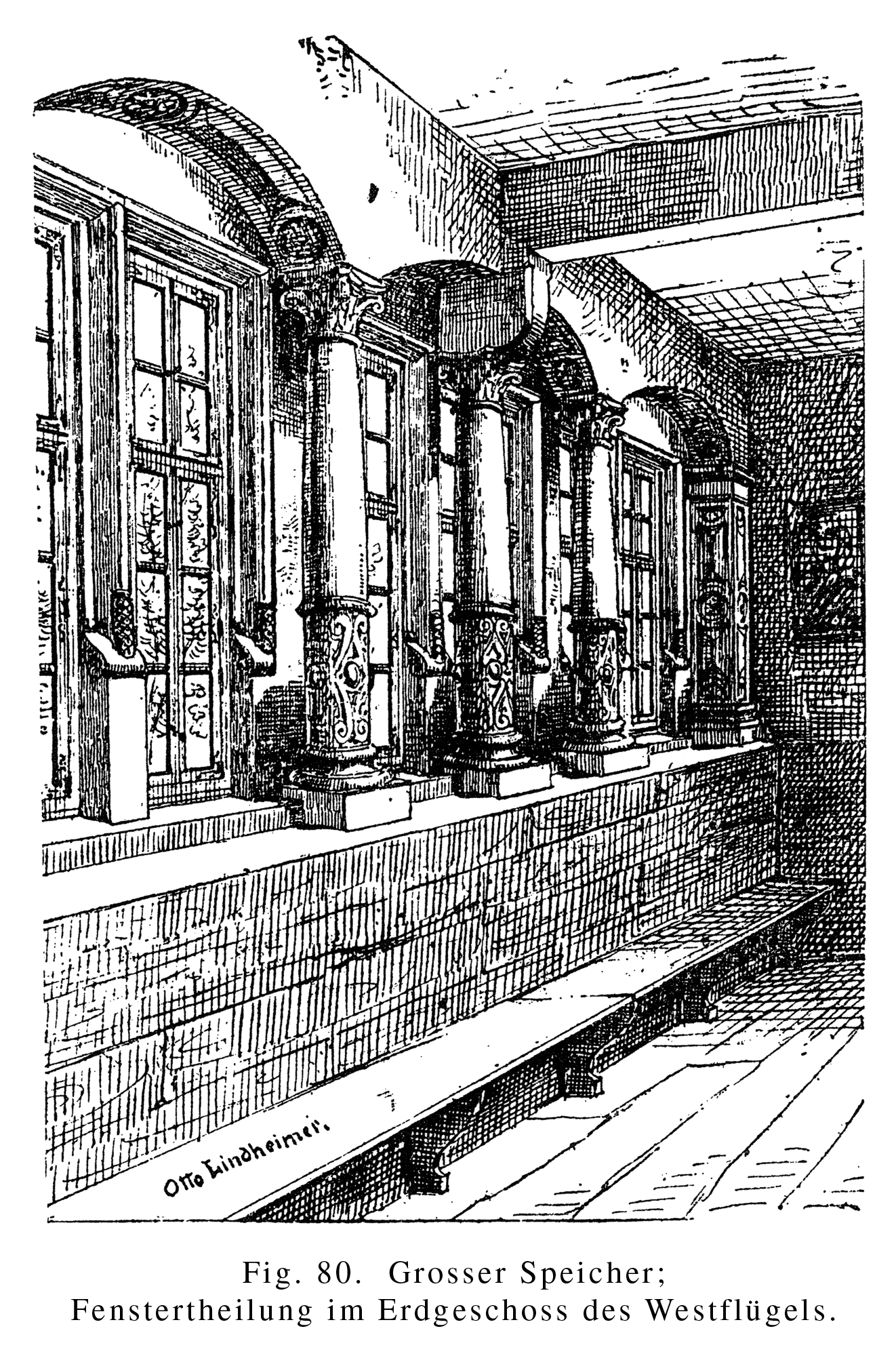
Group of windows on the first floor of the west wing, around 1880(drawing by Otto Lindheimer)

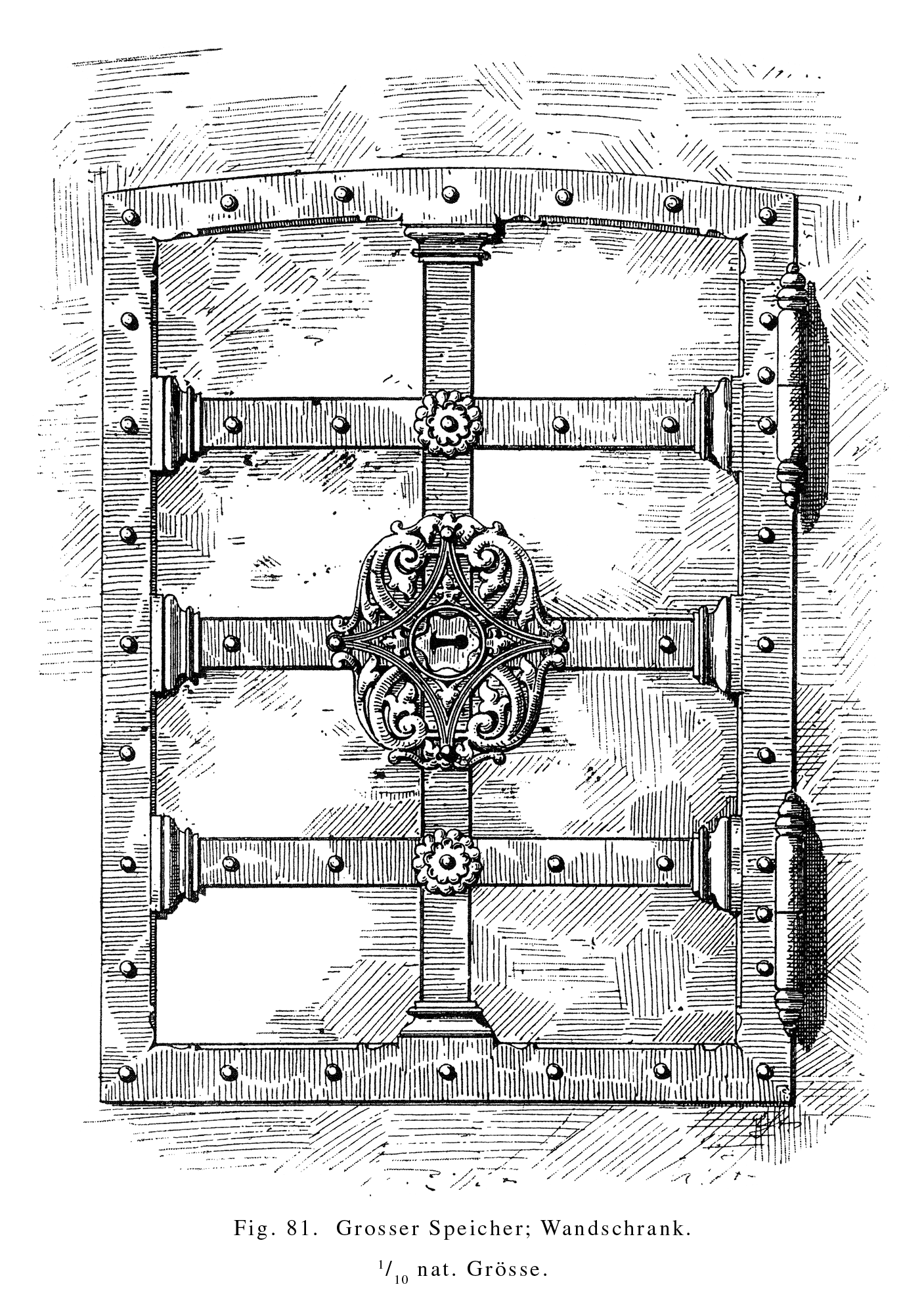
Wall cupboard in the hallway of the west building, before 1862(drawing by Julius Hülsen after Carl Theodor Reiffenstein, 1902)

The northern room, the interior of which is preserved in a drawing by Otto Lindheimer, had a rich, though not more precisely described, paneling. What remained until the end was the window group integrated into the north wall facing the garden. The six windows were covered by pointed arches, carried centrally by three Corinthian dwarf columns and in the corners by pillars. The central pillar not only supported the arch but also served as a support for the beam above, into which it slid. Each column shaft was adorned with strap ornaments, and the corner pillars had a simpler facetting. Together with an - imagined - corresponding furniture, the room, also referred to as a "showroom" by Dehio, conveyed the harmonious image of a patrician residence from the early 17th century. Nothing is known about the upper floors of the West Wing.

=== Destruction of the original state ===
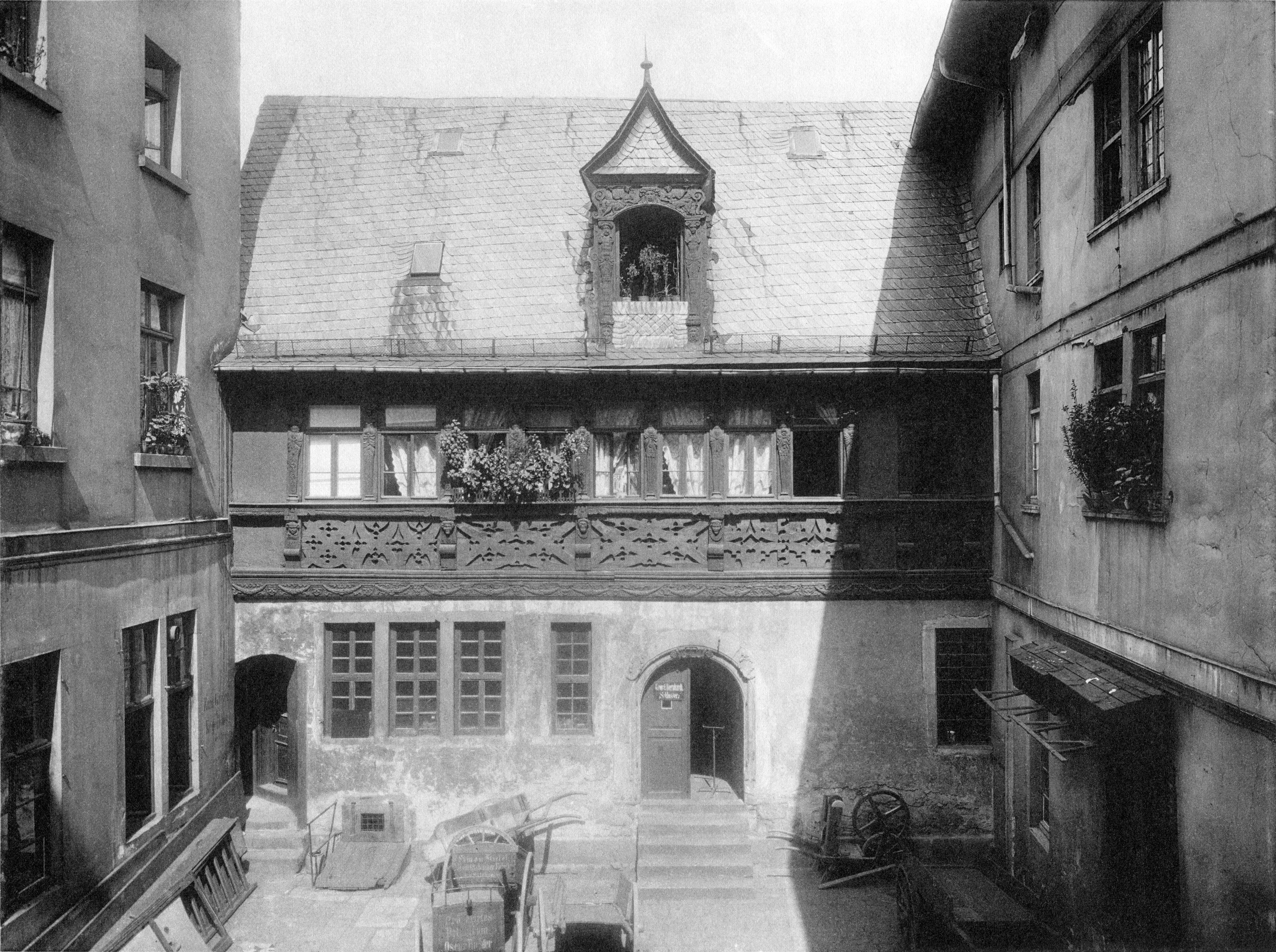
North building in the shadow of the surrounding buildings, 1901(photograph by Carl Friedrich Fay)

Carl Theodor Reiffenstein noted in his description as early as 1853 that the paneling of the grand chamber had been removed during a later renovation. In 1858, the first significant structural change occurred. In order to set up a bowling alley in the rear part, the then-owner installed a massive partition wall parallel to the courtyard side in the ground floor of the North wing. In the spring of 1859, the East and South wings were extended in the late Neoclassical style, the former receiving two additional floors and the latter one more.

The only part of the building that remained externally intact, the North wing, now stood almost entirely in the shadow of the now oversized remaining courtyard wings. Such treatment of historical building fabric was not uncommon in those years. For example, around the same time, one of the largest late medieval fresco cycles north of the Alps was destroyed in the nearby Carmelite monastery to make way for a fire station. Similarly, demolitions or extensions of medieval buildings in favor of tower-like "rental barracks," which could be considered the first architectural sins of Frankfurt's old town, were commonplace during the period of urban growth until at least 1866. It was not until the Imperial period that the city expanded into systematically planned Gründerzeit areas, which significantly reduced the tendency to build new buildings in the old town.

== Meaning ==
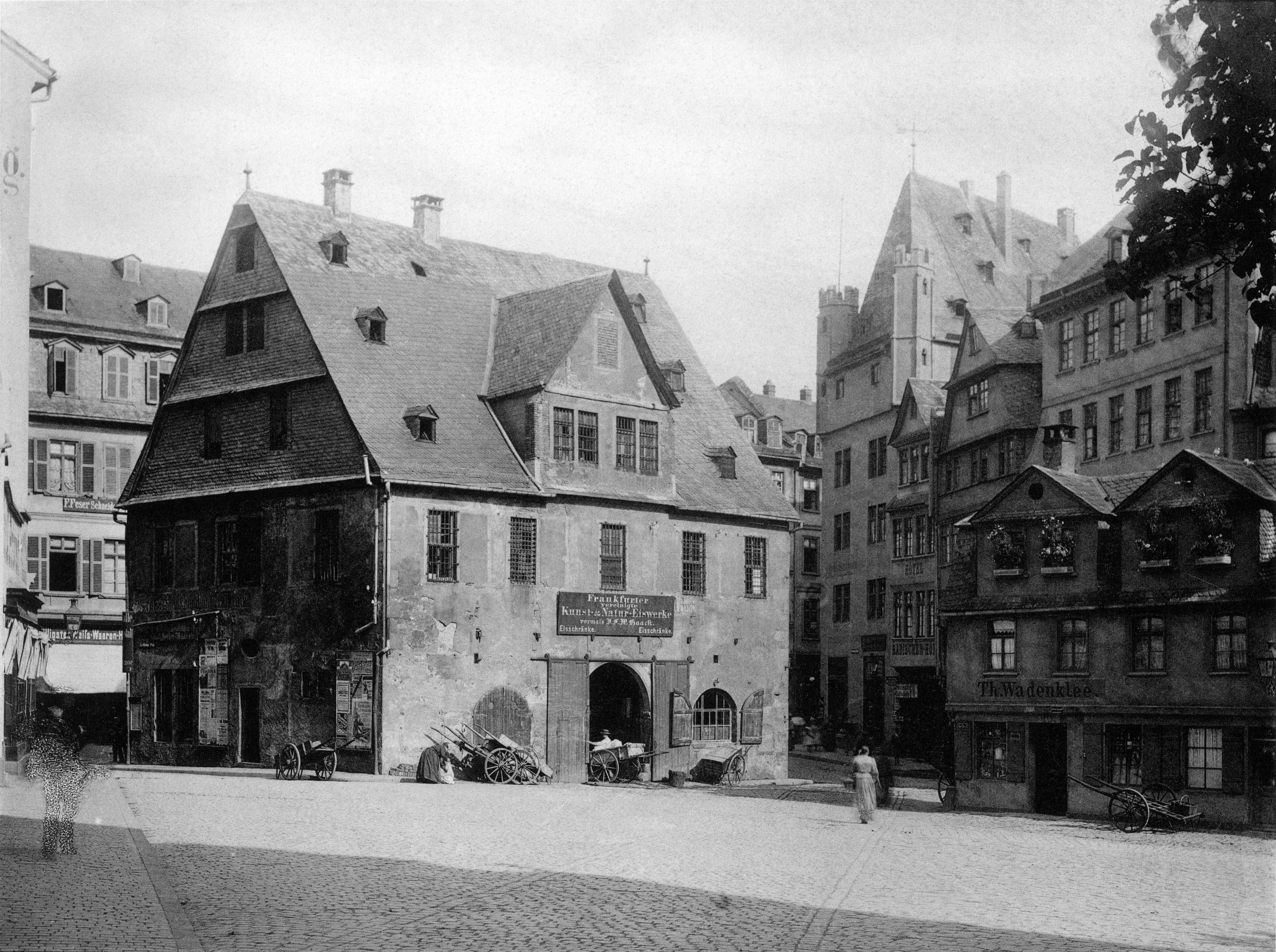
The flour scales on Garküchenplatz, around 1896(photograph by Carl Friedrich Fay)

The significance of the Großer Speicher does not arise from considering it as an individual structure, but rather from its placement within the entire art history of Frankfurt in the 16th and early 17th centuries. The city exhibited a very restrained reception of the Renaissance, while the Gothic style had a much longer decline, extending essentially until the 18th century. A good example of this tendency was the municipal grain scale built in 1716 between Fahrgasse and Garküchenplatz (destroyed in 1944), which, purely stylistically, could easily have been a descendant of the 16th century. The inherent rejection of outward ornamentation, which was typical of Frankfurt, and the initially assumed conservative attitude stood in peculiar contrast to other developments, such as the vigorously embraced Reformation.

Apart from the Salzhaus, which, in its form preserved until 1944, was a unique example even on a national scale, no buildings incorporating Renaissance ideas on a larger scale were constructed in the first 80 years of the 16th century. Even the Großer Engel built in 1562 on the Römerberg (destroyed in 1944, reconstructed between 1981 and 1983), which might be seen at first glance as the beginning of a development due to its rich carvings, was still entirely Gothic upon closer inspection, both in its decoration and its overall tower-like structure. The building can thus be seen at most as an example of a stronger fundamental tendency towards carved wooden architectural elements, especially corbels, from the mid-century onwards.

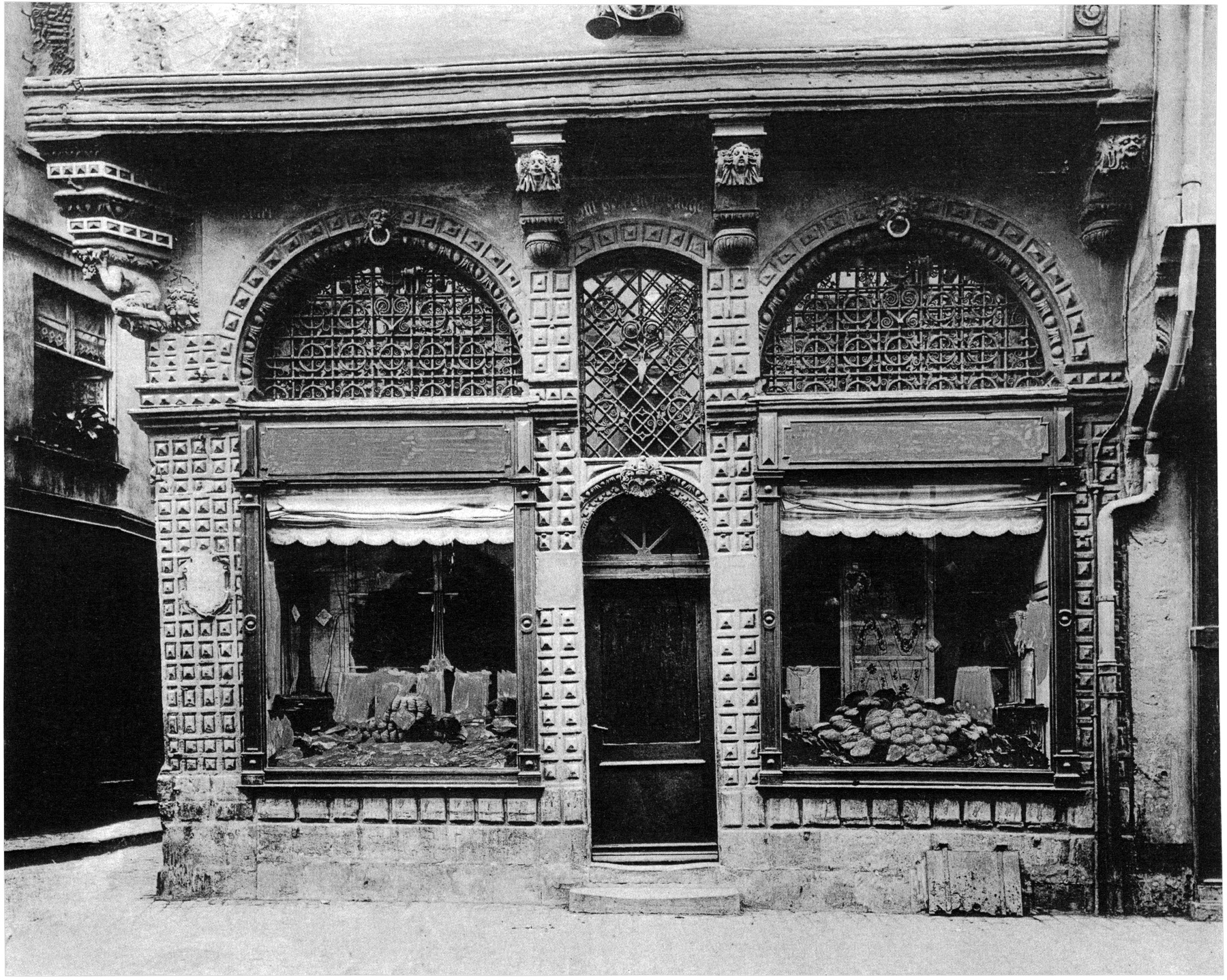
Diamond decoration on the first floor of the Goldene Waage, around 1900 / before 1899(photograph by Carl Friedrich Mylius)

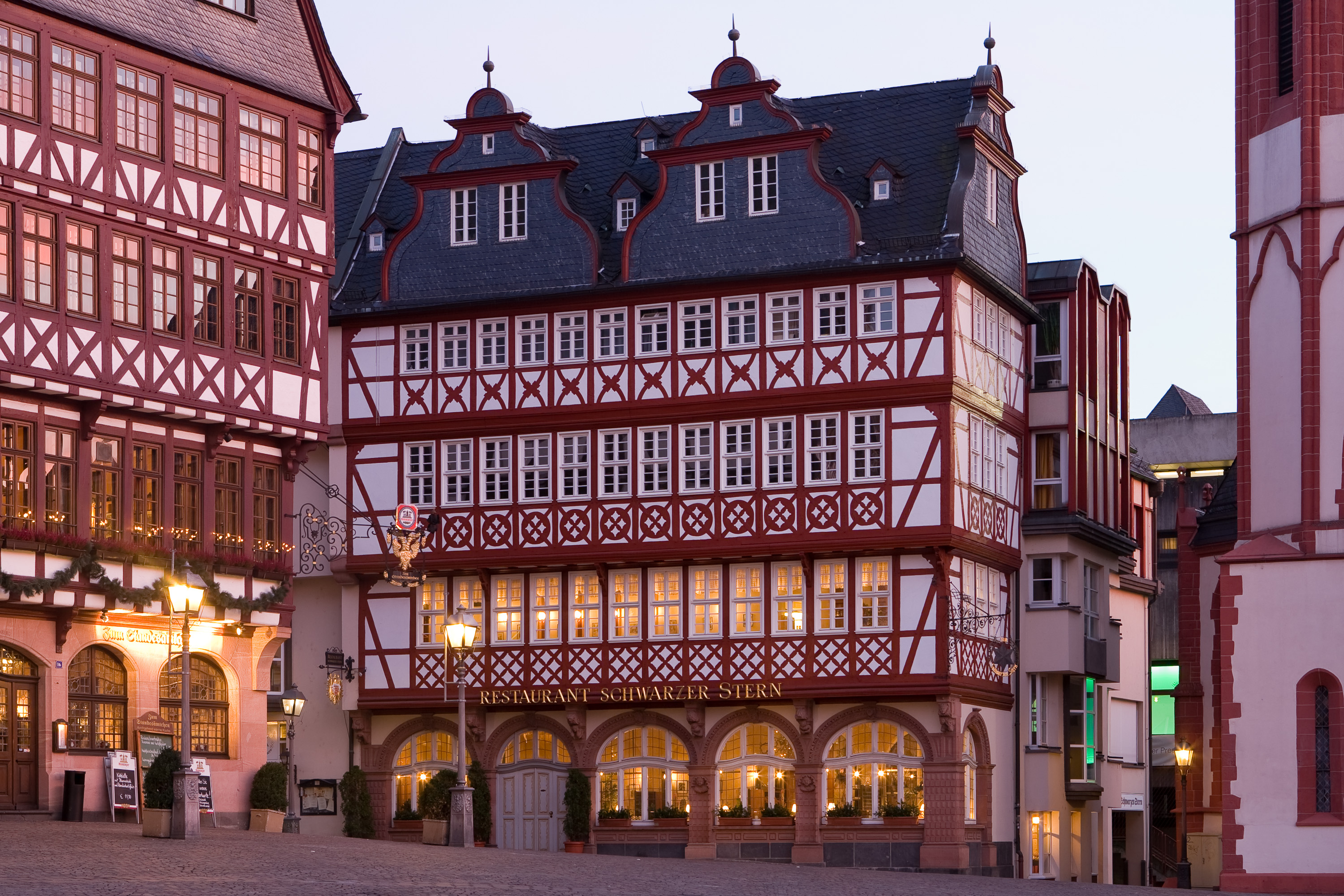
Schwarzer Stern, 2008

Due to the guild regulations, immigrants like Franz de le Boë were dependent on craftsmen from their new hometown, which had to result in an interaction. On the one hand, the forms of late Gothic architecture repeatedly made themselves felt in an otherwise completely dedicated Renaissance building project, and on the other hand, the craftsmen were forced to engage with pattern books of the new style for the first time and also had to translate ornamentation forms known only from stone construction into those of timber framing.

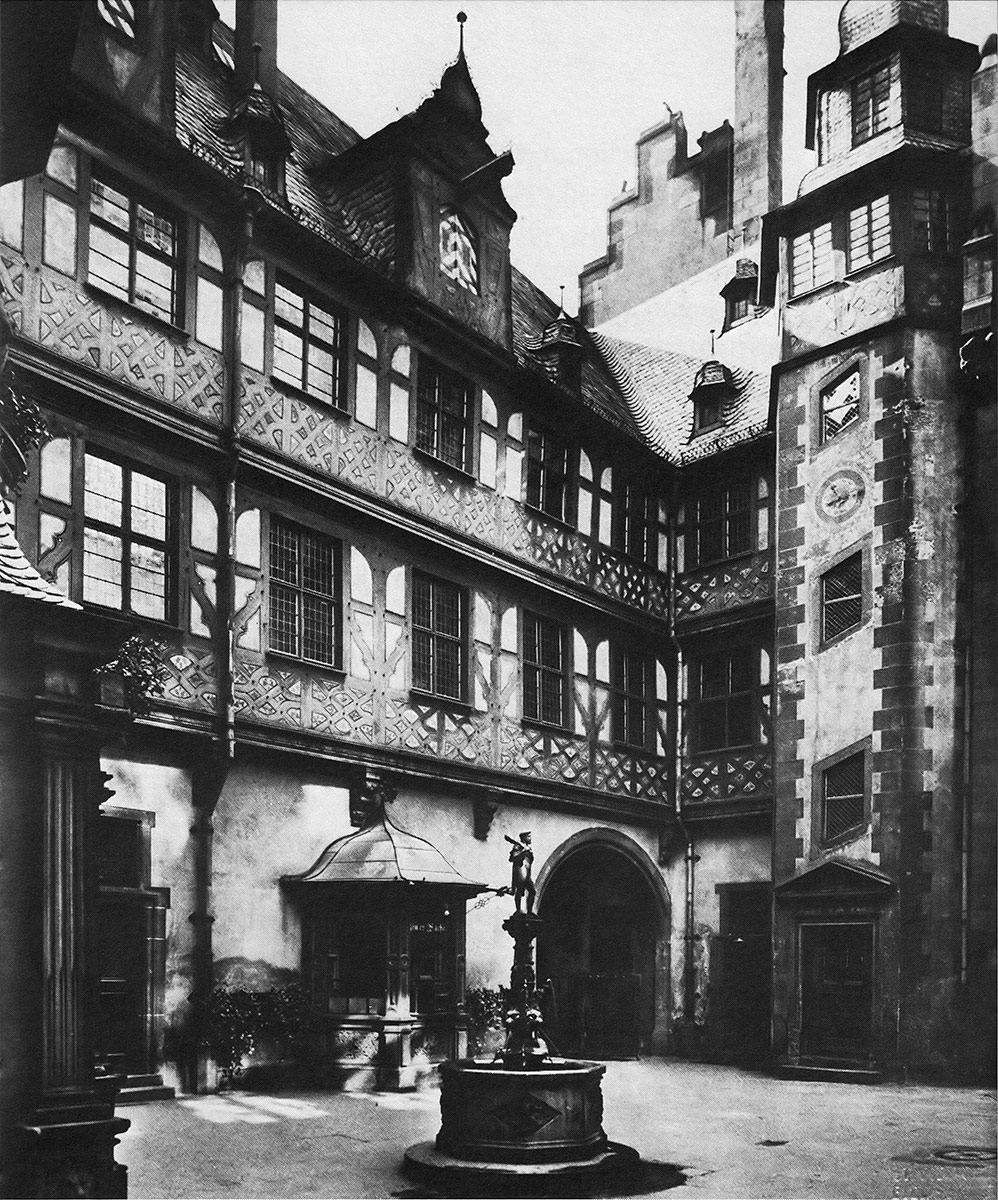
Courtyard side of Silberberg House, 1900s, after 1904

== Literature ==
=== Major works ===
- Johann Georg Battonn: Oertliche Beschreibung der Stadt Frankfurt am Main – Band V. Association for History and Antiquity Studies in Frankfurt am Main, Frankfurt am Main 1869, p. 224–230 and 244–249. (online).
- Rudolf Jung, Julius Hülsen: Die Baudenkmäler in Frankfurt am Main – Band 3, Privatbauten. Selbstverlag/Keller, Frankfurt am Main 1902–1914, p. 87–97.
- Walter Sage: Das Bürgerhaus in Frankfurt a. M. bis zum Ende des Dreißigjährigen Krieges (= Das Deutsche Bürgerhaus. Band 2). Wasmuth, Tübingen 1959, p. 54, 55, 93 and 94.

=== Used, further works ===
- Architekten- & Ingenieur-Verein (Hrsg.): Frankfurt am Main und seine Bauten. Self-published by the Association, Frankfurt am Main 1886.
- Olaf Cunitz: Stadtsanierung in Frankfurt am Main 1933–1945. Thesis for the degree of Magister Artium, Johann Wolfgang Goethe University Frankfurt am Main, Department 08 History / Historical Seminar, 1996.
- Das nächste Sanierungsprojekt. Abbruch der Schüppengasse. Der große Durchbruch zum Main. In: Frankfurter General-Anzeiger. 5. November 1937. In: Wolfgang Klötzer on behalf of the Frankfurt Association for History and Regional Studies and the Friends of Frankfurt (Eds.): Die Frankfurter Altstadt. Eine Erinnerung. Mit Zeichnungen von Richard Enders. Verlag Waldemar Kramer, Frankfurt am Main 1983, ISBN 3-7829-0286-6, S. 270 u. 272.
- Georg Dehio: Handbuch der Deutschen Kunstdenkmäler. Band IVa. Südwestdeutschland. 5. unveränderte Auflage. Deutscher Kunstverlag, Berlin 1937.
- Alexander Dietz: Frankfurter Handelsgeschichte – Band II. Herman Minjon Verlag, Frankfurt am Main 1921.
- Dietrich-Wilhelm Dreysse, Björn Wissenbach: Planung Bereich – Dom Römer. Spolien der Altstadt 1. Dokumentation der im Historischen Museum lagernden Originalbauteile Frankfurter Bürgerhäuser. City Planning Office, Frankfurt am Main, 2008.
- Karl Emil Otto Fritsch: Denkmäler Deutscher Renaissance. Publisher: Ernst Wasmuth, Berlin 1891.
- Wolfgang Klötzer: Zu Gast im alten Frankfurt. Hugendubel, München 1990, ISBN 3-88034-493-0
- Friedrich Krebs: Der Altstadtgesundungsplan der Stadt Frankfurt am Main (1936)In: Wolfgang Klötzer im Auftrag des Frankfurter Vereins für Geschichte und Landeskunde und der Freunde Frankfurts (Hrsg.): Die Frankfurter Altstadt. Eine Erinnerung. Mit Zeichnungen von Richard Enders. Waldemar Kramer, Frankfurt am Main 1983, ISBN 3-7829-0286-6, p. 216 u. 217.
- Georg Ludwig Kriegk: Deutsches Bürgerthum im Mittelalter. Neue Folge. Rütten und Löning, Frankfurt am Main 1871.
- Hans Lohne: Frankfurt um 1850. Nach Aquarellen und Beschreibungen von Carl Theodor Reiffenstein und dem Malerischen Plan von Friedrich Wilhelm Delkeskamp. Verlag Waldemar Kramer, Frankfurt am Main 1967, ISBN 3-7829-0015-4
- Fried Lübbecke: Frankfurt am Main. Verlag E. A. Seemann, Leipzig 1939 (Berühmte Kunststätten 84).
- Bernhard Müller: Die Mehlwaage. In: Alt-Frankfurt. Vierteljahrschrift für seine Geschichte und Kunst. 1. Volume, Issue 1, Herman Minjon Publishing House, Frankfurt am Main 1909.Karl Nahrgang: Die Frankfurter Altstadt. Eine historisch-geographische Studie. Verlag Waldemar Kramer, Frankfurt am Main 1949.
- Elsbet Orth: Frankfurt am Main im Früh- und Hochmittelalter. In:
- Anton Schindling: Wachstum und Wandel vom Konfessionellen Zeitalter bis zum Zeitalter Ludwigs XIV. Frankfurt am Main 1555–1685. In: ISBN 3-7995-4158-6
- Magnus Wintergerst: Franconofurd. Band I. Die Befunde der karolingisch-ottonischen Pfalz aus den Frankfurter Altstadtgrabungen 1953–1993. Archaeological Museum Frankfurt, Frankfurt am Main 2007, ISBN 3-88270-501-9 (Publications of the Archaeological Museum Frankfurt 22/1).
- Hermann Karl Zimmermann: Das Kunstwerk einer Stadt. Frankfurt am Main als Beispiel. Waldemar Kramer, Frankfurt am Main 1963.

=== Illustrations (as far as bibliographically traceable) ===
- Dieter Bartetzko, Detlef Hoffmann, Almut Junker, Viktoria Schmidt-Linsenhoff: Frankfurt in frühen Photographien 1850–1914. Reissue. Schirmer-Mosel., München 1988, ISBN 3-88814-284-9
- Bibliographical Institute (Ed.): Meyers Großes Konversations-Lexikon. Ein Nachschlagewerk des allgemeinen Wissens. Sixth, completely revised and expanded edition. Bibliographical Institute, Leipzig and Vienna 1902–1910.
- Carl Friedrich Fay, Carl Friedrich Mylius, Franz Rittweger, Fritz Rupp: Bilder aus dem alten Frankfurt am Main. Nach der Natur. Carl Friedrich Fay, Frankfurt am Main 1896–1911.
- Hans Pehl: Kaiser und Könige im Römer. Frankfurts Rathaus und seine Umgebung. Verlag Josef Knecht, Frankfurt am Main 1980, ISBN 3-7820-0455-8
- Friedrich August Ravenstein: August Ravensteins Geometrischer Plan von Frankfurt am Main. Publisher of the Geographical Institute in Frankfurt am Main, Frankfurt am Main 1862.
- Ludwig Ravenstein: Ludwig Ravenstein's Spezial-Plan von Frankfurt a.M., Bockenheim & Bornheim. Engraving, printing, and publishing by the Geographical Institute of Ludwig Ravenstein in Frankfurt am Main, Frankfurt am Main, in 1895.
- Benno Reifenberg, Fried Lübbecke, Richard Kirn, Franz Lerner, Bernd Lohse: Porträt einer Stadt. Frankfurt am Main. Vergangenheit und Gegenwart. Umschau Verlag, Frankfurt am Main 1958.
- James Westfall Thompson: The Frankfort Book Fair. The Francofordiense Emporium of Henri Estienne. The Caxton Club, Chicago 1911.
