= German Institute of Development and Sustainability =

Think tank

German Institute of Development and Sustainability (IDOS)
- German Institute of Development and Sustainability (IDOS)
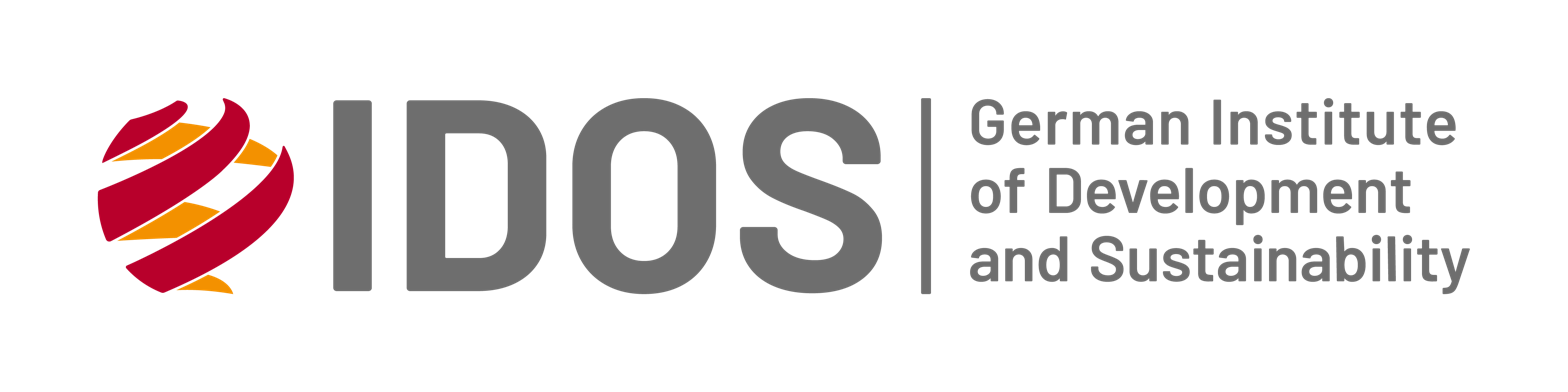
- Established: 1964
- Affiliations: Johannes-Rau-Forschungsgemeinschaft
- Director: Anna-Katharina Hornidge
- Website: https://www.idos-research.de/en/

The German Institute of Development and Sustainability gGmbH (IDOS, pronounced: ˈaɪ̯dɔs) is a research institute and think tank specialising in international sustainable development, based in Bonn, Germany.

== History ==
The institute was founded in Berlin in 1964 as a non-profit limited liability company under the name German Institute for Development Policy (DIE) and has been based in Bonn’s Tulpenfeld district since 2000. Its work is primarily funded by public funds; 75% of the shares are held by the Federal Republic of Germany and 25% by the state of North Rhine-Westphalia. On 23 June 2022, the institute was renamed the German Institute of Development and Sustainability (IDOS).

The organisation is a member of the Johannes Rau Research Foundation and the Working Group of Ministry-Affiliated Research Institutions. IDOS employs around 180 staff, approximately two-thirds of whom work in research. Anna-Katharina Hornidge has been Director of IDOS since 1 March 2020. From 2003 to 2018, the institute was headed by Dirk Messner.

== Approach and Objectives ==
IDOS conducts empirical, theory-led and application-oriented research, facilitates transregional knowledge cooperation and training, and offers policy advice at the intersection of “development” and “sustainability”, with the aspiration to co-shape a collaborative multipolar world for sustainable futures. IDOS defines sustainable futures as futures that ensure a life of dignity whilst respecting the planet’s carrying capacity. Rather than seeking a single path, IDOS emphasises the plural form ‘futures’ to highlight the diversity of possible sustainable pathways. IDOS provides independent and research-based advice to decision-makers in Germany, Europe and other countries and world regions, as well as at the global level, such as the United Nations (UN), the G7 and the G20. The Institute collaborates with research networks and partners from academia and the professional world in all regions of the globe.

== Tasks ==
The Institute’s core tasks are:

- Research in the fields of development theory and development policy,
- Advising German and international actors and institutions in the field of development cooperation,
- Training university graduates through a nine-month Postgraduate Programme for careers in development cooperation, and providing further training for emerging leaders from emerging economies and Europe through the Managing Global Governance (MGG) Academy and the Shaping Futures Academy.

== Research ==
The research staff at IDOS focus on four research departments:

- Inter- and transnational cooperation
- Transformation of economic and social systems
- Environmental governance
- Transformation of political (dis)order

IDOS conducts research on the following regions: Africa, the Middle East and North Africa, Latin America, East Asia, South Asia, Central Asia and Eastern Europe.

== Policy advise ==
The Institute provides policy advise at the German, European and international levels. Its aim is to bring together global discourse in the fields of international politics, cooperation and sustainable development; to develop policy-relevant concepts based on this discourse; and to comment on transnational and global issues and identify potential solutions.

In particular, IDOS advises the Federal Ministry for Economic Cooperation and Development (BMZ) and other federal ministries, the Bundestag, the European institutions, international organisations, German public institutions involved in development cooperation, and other policy-shaping institutions and networks.

In addition, research cooperation with African think tanks is being systematically expanded; the T20 Africa Standing Group, co-founded by IDOS, plays a central role in this.

== Training programmes ==
IDOS runs three academies which shape dialogue processes that allow for a joint definition of problems and the envisioning, negotiating and shaping of sustainable futures, bringing together actors from different world regions, sectors and social groups.

- The Postgraduate Programme for Sustainability Cooperation (PGP) equips graduates for demanding tasks in German and European organisations of international cooperation for sustainable development.
- The Managing Global Governance (MGG) Programme is an innovative platform providing state and non-governmental stakeholders from emerging economies and Europe with the opportunity to receive training and engage in knowledge partnerships and policy dialogue.
- The Shaping Futures Academy is an innovative training and dialogue programme geared to early-career researchers from African partner countries.

== Publication series ==
The Institute publishes its own series of publications in which IDOS researchers and guest authors regularly share their latest research findings and views on the latest developments and issues in international development policy.

- The current column
- Policy Brief
- Discussion Paper
- Studies
- a monthly newsletter

== Library and Documentation ==
IDOS has a specialist academic library that is open to the public. It does not have a defined collection mandate, but supports the Institute’s researchers by providing literature on a project-by-project basis. The collection comprises around 20,000 printed volumes, as well as electronic access to numerous databases, journal bundles and individual titles in the fields of development cooperation, international relations and politics, global public policy, global and sustainable development, and area studies. The IDOS library is also part of the ‘Specialist Information Network for International Relations and Area Studies’ and is helping to develop the ‘World Affairs Online’ database, a database covering issues relating to international relations and area studies.

== See also ==
- State-owned enterprises of Germany
