= Dieter Engels =

German lawyer and senior government official

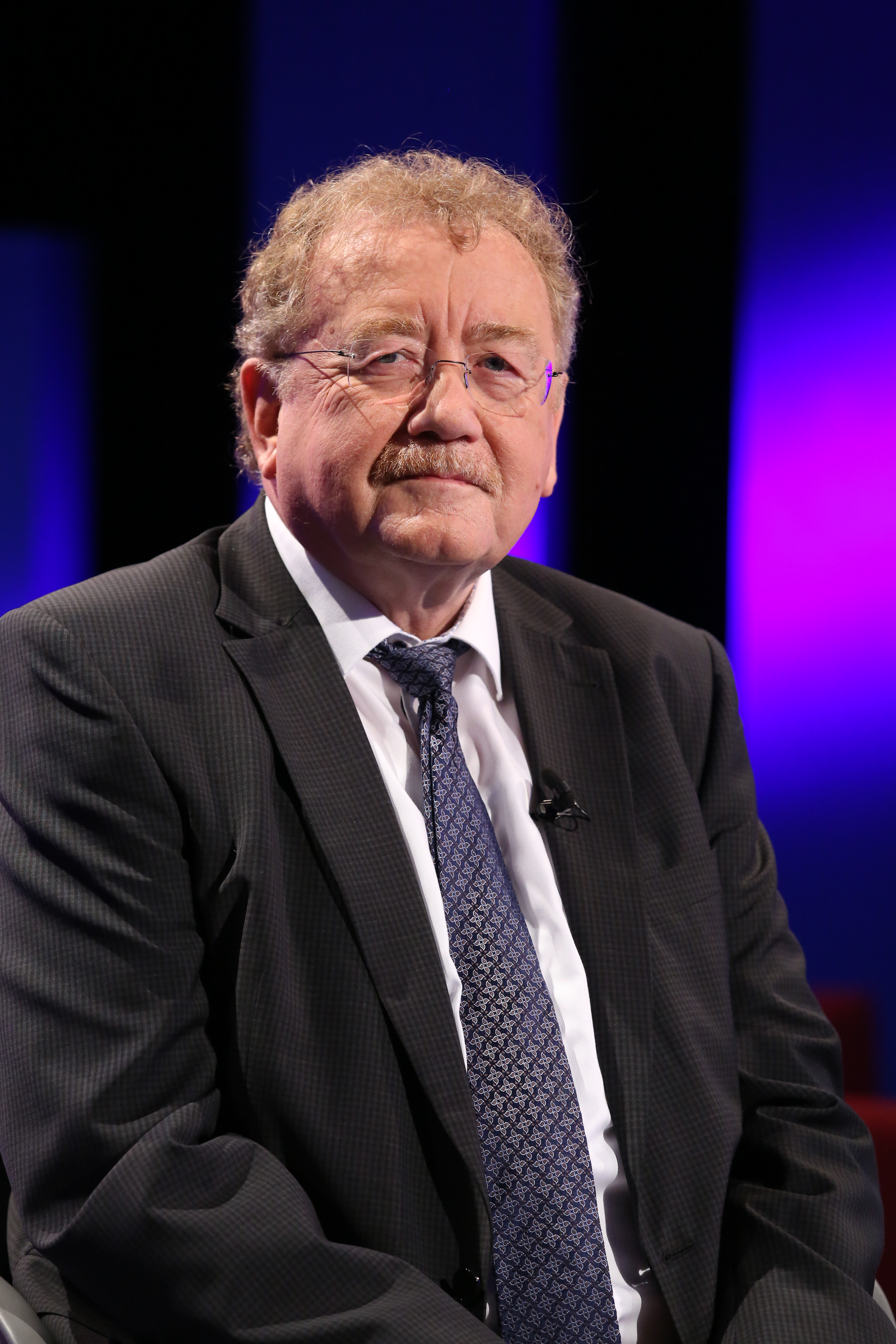
Dieter Engels

Dieter Engels (born 7 February 1950 in Mechernich) is a German lawyer and senior government official. He received a Doctor of Law degree from the University of Bonn in 1979. From 1968 to 1973 he studied legal science in Bonn. He has been president of the Federal Court of Auditors of Germany since 2002, and before that was vice president from 1996 to 2002.

He has been a member of the University Council of the University of Bayreuth since early 2010. In 2013, he was elected Chairman of the University Council of the university of Bonn. His successor at the Federal Audit Office since July 2014 is Kay Scheller.
