= Bundesrechnungshof =

Federal audit office in Germany

Coordinates: 50°43′40″N 7°06′42″E

Federal Court of Audit
- Bundesrechnungshof
- Official logo

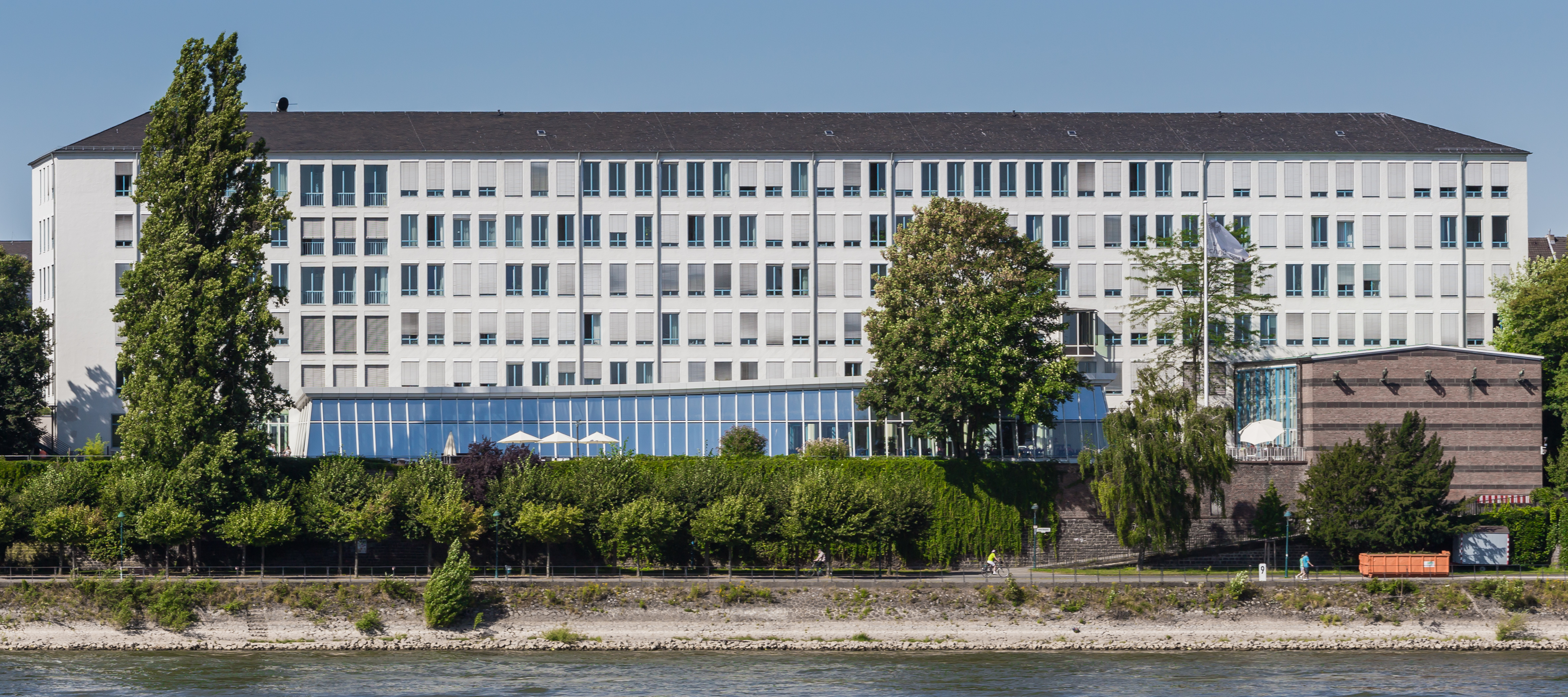
- Seat in Bonn

Agency overview
- Formed: 1950; 76 years ago
- Preceding agency: Court of Auditors of the German Empire
- Headquarters: Bonn
- Employees: 1162 (2021)
- Annual budget: €186.956 Million (FY2023)
- Agency executives: Kay Scheller, President; Christian Ahrendt, Vice-President
- Parent department: none
- Website: www.bundesrechnungshof.de

The Bundesrechnungshof (Federal Court of Audit) is the supreme federal authority for audit matters in the Federal Republic of Germany. There are equivalent bodies at state level. The status of the Bundesrechnungshof, its members and its essential functions are guaranteed by the German Constitution (Art. 114 GG), and regulated by other legislation (i.e. Bundesrechnungshof Act, Federal Budget Code). It is an independent judicial body, with around 600 employees. Its current President is Kay Scheller.

The institution is a supreme federal authority only as far as it administers internal tasks such as personnel affairs, management of buildings or clearance of travel expenses and the like. Processing its core duties - auditing, reporting and counseling as external financial controllers - it is not part of the executive branch of Germany, but is positioned beyond the three classical constitutional powers. The Bundesrechnungshof is not subordinated to the federal government. Even the legislative (parliament) cannot instruct it. At best, the parliament can ask the authority to audit certain issues. From the third power, justice, it differs firstly by freely choosing the subject matters it intends to audit and secondly by not delivering legally binding rules, but by issuing recommendations. Bundesrechnungshof's exact placement within a classical system of the division of powers is disputed.

== Role ==
The Bundesrechnungshof examines the financial management of the Federal Government, its various property funds and state-owned companies, carrying out sample audits of revenue and expenditure totalling over 500 billion Euros. Its audit mandate also covers social security institutions and the activities of the Federal Government in private-law enterprises of which it is a shareholder. This includes areas such as defence, roadworks, taxation, and the Federal Government's activity as a minority shareholder of the formerly nationalised railways, post, and phone companies (Deutsche Bahn AG, Deutsche Post AG and Deutsche Telekom AG respectively).

The Bundesrechnungshof makes recommendations on the basis of its audit experience and provides advice to the audited bodies, to the German Parliament and the Federal Government. Its consulting activities have steadily increased and set out significant recommendations for quality improvement, pointing out the potential for savings or increases in revenue.

The Bundesrechnungshof reports on its audit findings in management letters which are sent to the audited bodies for comment. In addition the Bundesrechnungshof submits an annual report ("Observations") to both Houses of the German Parliament, the Bundestag and the Bundesrat, as well as to the Federal Government. The annual report is also used as a basis for Parliament authorising the Federal Government's budget. The annual report is presented to the public at a federal press conference. The Bundesrechnungshof may at any time submit special reports on matters of major significance to both Houses of Parliament, and to the Federal Government.

The Bundesrechnungshof provides advice to the executive and legislative branches by including recommendations for improvement in its management letters and annual reports, as well as by commenting - orally or in writing - on topical issues such as government bills and major procurement projects, or in the course of the annual budget procedure.

By virtue of legislation regarding German reunification, the Bundesrechnungshof's new headquarters were transferred from Frankfurt am Main to Bonn, effective 1 July 2000. The Bundesrechnungshof also has a branch office in Potsdam.

== History ==
The first precursor of that auditory branch in Germany is the Prussian Audit Office. Its name as "Rechnungskammer" comes from the medivial concept of a Chambres des Comptes overseeing the spending of the state. In medieval times it did have regulatory functions which it lost to various administrative offices, so much that only reporting functions were left. The installation of a high office is influenced by the mismanagement of the Cabinet of Three Counts in Prussia (1702–1710).

The "Preußische Oberrechnungskammer" (Prussian High Audit Office) was founded in 1714 by King Frederick William I as the "General-Rechen-Kammer" (General Audit Office), given more powers in 1723 becoming the "Ober-Kriegs- und Domänen-Rechenkammer" (High War and Domains Audit Office). This office did exist until 1945. It is the basis of the "Rechnungshof des Norddeutschen Bundes" (Court of Auditors of the North German Confederation) founded in 1868, which was soon to become the "Rechnungshof des Deutschen Reiches" (Court of Auditors of the German Reich) in 1871. It was reestablished in 1948 as the "Rechnungshof im Vereinigten Wirtschaftsgebiet" (Court of Auditors of the United Economic Area), and with the foundation of the West-German Federal Republic it became the "Bundesrechnungshof" (Federal Court of Audito).

In 1989 the Bundesrechnungshof hosted XIII INCOSAI, the thirteenth triennial convention of the International Organization of Supreme Audit Institutions.

== Presidents ==
- 1950–1956: Josef Mayer, de:Josef Mayer
- 1957: Heinz Maria Oeftering, de:Heinz Maria Oeftering
- 1957–1963: Guido Hertel, de:Guido Hertel (Jurist)
- 1964–1971: Volkmar Hopf, de:Volkmar Hopf
- 1971–1978: Hans Schäfer (politician), de:Hans Schäfer (Jurist)
- 1978–1985: Karl Wittrock, de:Karl Wittrock
- 1985–1993: Heinz Günther Zavelberg, de:Heinz Günter Zavelberg
- 1993–2001: Hedda von Wedel, de:Hedda von Wedel
- 2002–2014: Dieter Engels
- 2014–2026: Kay Scheller, de:Kay Scheller
- since 2026: Ansgar Heveling

== See also ==
- Kornmarkt (Frankfurt am Main)
