= Dehio =

Dehio is a surname. Notable people with the surname include:

- Erhard Arnold Julius Dehio (1855–1940), Baltic German merchant and politician, former mayor of Tallinn (1918)
- Georg Dehio (1850–1932), Baltic German art historian
- Ludwig Dehio (1888–1963), German archivist and historian, son of Georg Dehio
- Karl Gottfried Konstantin Dehio (1851–1927), Baltic German internist and professor of pathology

== See also ==
- 48415 Dehio, a main-belt asteroid named after Georg Dehio
