= State-owned enterprises of Germany =

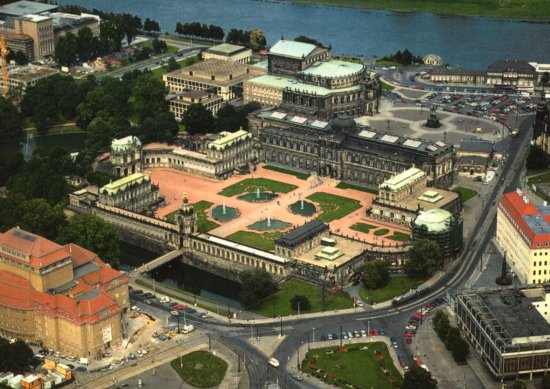
Zwinger is managed by the State Palaces, Castles and Gardens of Saxony

After the 2008 financial crisis, Germany's stock of gross financial assets increased significantly, turning it into the second largest stock among OECD countries after the US. Yet research has shown that the more that the government owns of an enterprise, the more extreme the level of tax avoidance.

== List ==
| Company | share | direct Owner | Note |
|---|---|---|---|
| Autobahn GmbH des Bundes | full ownership | Germany | Operator of the German express way network. |
| Airbus | 12% | | 28% total with France and Spain |
| Commerzbank | 15,6% | KfW | |
| Bundesdruckerei | Full Ownership | | Federal Print Office, Renationalised in 2013 |
| Deutsche Bahn | full ownership | Germany | |
| Deutsche Post | 25.5% | Federal Ministry for Economic Affairs and Climate Action | Assets including DHL and Deutsche Postbank are therefore also partially owned by the government |
| Deutsche Telekom | 31,9% | Germany over KfW | |
| DFS Deutsche Flugsicherung GmbH | full ownership | Germany | |
| Evonik Industries | 58,9% | RAG-Stiftung | RAG-Stiftung is a foundation held by the federal republic and the states of North Rhine-Westphalia and Saarland |
| Hapag Lloyd | 23.2% | Hamburg | |
| Hypo Real Estate | Full Ownership | SoFFin | Seized by SoFFin in 2009 to restore financial stability to the German housing market |
| KfW Bank | Full Ownership | German government | following assets amounting to a worth of $70.6Bn |
| RAG AG | Full Ownership | RAG-Stiftung | RAG-Stiftung is a foundation held by the federal republic and the states of North Rhine-Westphalia and Saarland |
| Uniper | Full Ownership | Germany | Emergency rescue in 2022 |
| Volkswagen Group | 12.7% | Lower-Saxony | 20% of voting rights |

=== Further government ownerships ===
- a range of competing Landesbanken, regionally organised by the Länder, function predominantly to provide wholesale banking, part of the Sparkassen-Finanzgruppe
- the Sparkassen, also part of the Sparkassen-Finanzgruppe with more than 400 German SOEs holding more than 40% of bank assets in Germany
- Germany owns an approximate 4% stake in British Telecom as 12% of the stake of British Telecom was sold to T-Mobile in early 2015.

Note that many smaller State owned enterprises are owned by individual states of Germany such as TransnetBW and Rothaus (State Brewery of Baden).

On a local and regional level, public transport is often operated by SOE, such as BVB (Berlin), Hochbahn (Hamburg) or LVB (Leipzig). Power generation, water and gas supply were until the 1990s often publicly owned (Stadtwerke) - the picture is much more diverse today, involving often forms of PPP, but with the local governments still exercising considerable control.
