= Kicking Away the Ladder =

Book published in 2002

Kicking Away the Ladder: Development Strategy in Historical Perspective
- Cover of the 2002 Anthem Press edition
- Author: Ha-Joon Chang
- Language: English
- Genre: Comparative politics, Developmental economics
- Publisher: Anthem Press
- Publication date: July 1, 2002
- Publication place: United Kingdom
- ISBN: 978-1-84331-027-3

Kicking Away the Ladder: Development Strategy in Historical Perspective is a book about developmental economics written by Ha-Joon Chang, a South Korean developmental and institutional economist. The book was published in 2002.

The book argues that developed countries developed not necessarily through free trade but through many interventionist and protectionist "institutions" and "policies" to accelerate their development, then attempted to prohibit others from doing the same through various international organisations like the World Trade Organization, World Bank, and International Monetary Fund, hence kicking away the very ladder that they used to ascend. The book's namesake is derived from German economist Friedrich List's famous phrase in his book The National System of Political Economy.

== Overview ==
In Kicking Away the Ladder, Chang argues that many now-developed countries relied on state-led measures such as tariff protection, export subsidies, and infant-industry protection (an idea borrowed from Friedrich List) during their own development, rather than following the freer-market prescriptions they later promoted to developing countries. Chang challenges the view that institutions and property rights are the sole or primary drivers of development but does not reject their importance altogether.

Chang uses a historical approach rather than a strictly quantitative one, examining the different policies and institutions used by now-developed countries in their developing stages including their histories of industrialisation. For instance, he examines England's export duties on wool and wool-manufactured products in the 13th to 14th centuries and U.S. government investment in the pharmaceutical industry via the National Institutes of Health (NIH).

The book concludes that there is no single best development model that is universally applicable, and does not necessarily advocate for all developing countries to embrace protectionism per se; Chang notes that developing countries must learn from the historical experiences of now-developed countries rather than from their current teachings that are ostensibly based on neoliberalism.

Chang has won the Myrdal Prize and the Leontief Prize for his authorship of Kicking Away the Ladder, among other books.

== Chapters ==
The book consists of four chapters including sixteen sections. Chang approaches the topic from a historical perspective, particularly focusing on the use of trade barriers such as tariffs in the earlier stages of various developed countries.

=== Chapter 1: How did rich countries really become rich? ===
This chapter consists of four sections.

Chang introduces the basic purpose of the book in this chapter, stating early on that under the pressure of the International Development Policy Establishment which is "controlled by developed countries," developing countries have been forced to implement a series of "good policies" and "good institutions."

"Good policies" refers to those that have been recognised by the Washington Consensus, such as trade liberalisation, privatisation, and deregulation. In contrast, "good institutions" refers to the systems used by developed countries such as the United States and United Kingdom, including but not limited to the "democratic system," "good bureaucracies," judicial independence, private property protection (including intellectual property), and central bank independence.

In the second section, he references Friedrich List's work The National System of Political Economy, pointing out that "115 of the book's 435 pages" were used to review the various trade and industrial policies of Western countries and that the England was the pioneer of infant-industry protection. He also makes the distinction between inductive and deductive reasoning in historical analysis with a particular focus on the German Historical School. He is broadly disapproving of neoclassical economics, which he characterises in the book as ignorant of history and opposed to inductive reasoning. References to the Industrial Revolution are also made.

== Publication information ==
Kicking away the Ladder was first published in the U.K. by Anthem Press. The book has since been translated into Chinese by China's Social Sciences Academic Press (Simplified Chinese: 社会科学文献出版社).

== Awards and reception ==
This and other works led to his being awarded the 2005 Wassily Leontief Prize for Advancing the Frontiers of Economic Thought from the Global Development and Environment Institute (previous prize-winners include Amartya Sen, John Kenneth Galbraith, Herman Daly, Alice Amsden and Robert Wade).

The book's methodology was criticized by American Douglas Irwin, Professor of Economics at Dartmouth College and author of a 2011 study of the Smoot–Hawley tariff, writing on the website of the Economic History Association:

Chang only looks at countries that developed during the nineteenth century and a small number of the policies they pursued. He did not examine countries that failed to develop in the nineteenth century and see if they pursued the same heterodox policies only more intensively. This is a poor scientific and historical method. Suppose a doctor studied people with long lives and found that some smoked tobacco, but did not study people with shorter lives to see if smoking was even more prevalent. Any conclusions drawn only from the observed relationship would be quite misleading.

Chang countered Irwin's criticisms by arguing that countries that had failed to develop had generally followed free market policies. Chang also argued that while state interventionism sometimes produced economic failures, it had a better record than unregulated free market economies which, he maintained, very rarely succeeded in producing economic development. He cited evidence that GDP growth in developing countries had been higher prior to external pressures recommending deregulation and extended his analysis to the failures of free trade to induce growth through privatisation and anti-inflationary policies. Chang's book won plaudits from Nobel Prize–winning economist Joseph Stiglitz for its fresh insight and effective blend of contemporary and historical cases but was criticised by former World Bank economist William Easterly, who said that Chang used selective evidence in his book. Chang responded to Easterly's criticisms, asserting that Easterly misread his argument. Easterly in turn provided a counter-reply. Stanley Engerman, Professor of Economic History at University of Rochester praised Chang's approach:

Ha-Joon Chang has examined a large body of historical material to reach some very interesting and important conclusions about institutions and economic development. Not only is the historical picture re-examined, but Chang uses this to argue the need for a changing attitude to the institutions desired in today's developing nations. Both as historical reinterpretation and policy advocacy, Kicking Away the Ladder deserves a wide audience among economists, historians, and members of the policy establishment.
