= Ha-Joon Chang =

South Korean economist (born 1963)

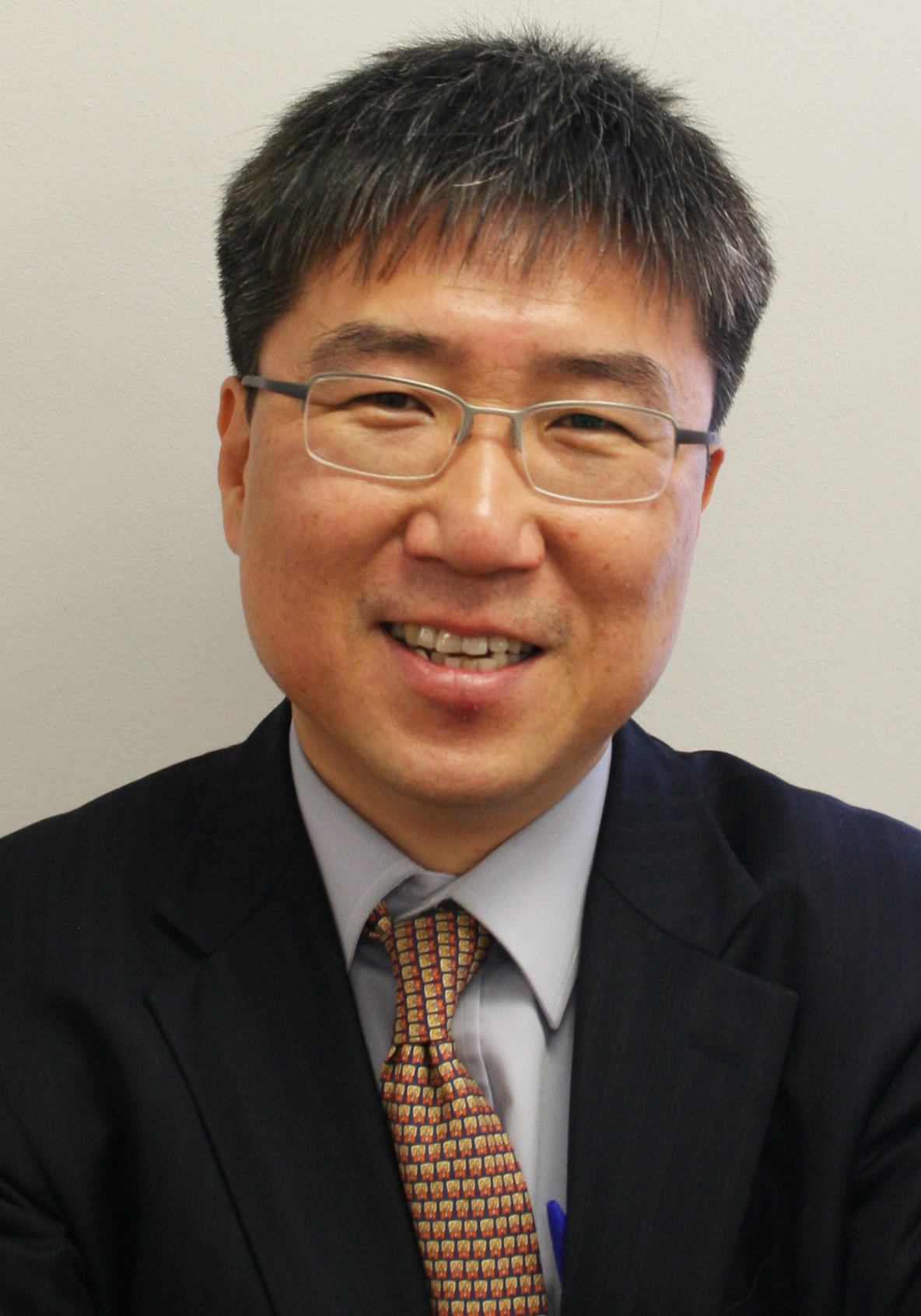
- Chang in 2011
- Born: 7 October 1963 (age 62); Seoul, South Korea

Academic background
- Education: Seoul National University (BA); University of Cambridge (MPhil, PhD)
- Doctoral advisor: Robert Rowthorn; John Hicks
- Influences: Robert Rowthorn; Joseph Stiglitz

Academic work
- Discipline: Development economics
- School or tradition: Institutional economics
- Institutions: SOAS University of London
- Awards: Gunnar Myrdal Prize (2003); Wassily Leontief Prize (2005)

Korean name
- Hangul: 장하준
- Hanja: 張夏准
- RR: Jang Hajun
- MR: Chang Hajun
- IPA: [tɕaŋ ɦa.dʑun]
- Website: Information at IDEAS / RePEc

Ha-Joon Chang (/tʃæŋ/; Korean: 장하준; born 7 October 1963) is a South Korean economist and academic. Chang specialises in institutional economics and development, and lectured in economics at the University of Cambridge from 1990–2021 before becoming professor of economics at the School of Oriental and African Studies (SOAS) in 2022. Chang is the author of several bestselling books on economics and development policy, most notably Kicking Away the Ladder: Development Strategy in Historical Perspective (2002). In 2013, Prospect magazine ranked Chang as one of the top 20 World Thinkers.

Chang has served as a consultant to the World Bank, the Asian Development Bank, the European Investment Bank, as well as to Oxfam and various United Nations agencies. He is also a fellow at the Center for Economic and Policy Research in Washington, D.C. In addition, Chang serves on the advisory board of Academics Stand Against Poverty (ASAP).

== Biography ==
After graduating from Seoul National University's Department of Economics, he studied at the University of Cambridge, earning an MPhil and a PhD for his thesis entitled The Political Economy of Industrial Policy – Reflections on the Role of State Intervention in 1991. Chang's contribution to economics started while studying under Robert Rowthorn, a leading British Marxist economist, with whom he worked on the elaboration of the theory of industrial policy, which he described as a middle way between central planning and an unrestrained free market. His work in this area is part of a broader approach to economics known as institutionalist political economy which places economic history and socio-political factors at the centre of the evolution of economic practices.

== Writing ==
=== Kicking Away the Ladder ===
In his book Kicking Away the Ladder, Chang argued that all major developed countries used interventionist economic policies in order to get rich and then tried to forbid other countries from doing the same. The World Trade Organization, World Bank, and International Monetary Fund come in for strong criticism from Chang for "ladder-kicking" of this type which, he argues, is the fundamental obstacle to poverty alleviation in the developing world.

The book won the European Association for Evolutionary Political Economy's 2003 Gunnar Myrdal Prize and the 2005 Leontief Prize for Advancing the Frontiers of Economic Thought from the Global Development and Environment Institute (previous prize-winners include Amartya Sen, John Kenneth Galbraith, Herman Daly, Alice Amsden and Robert Wade).

=== Bad Samaritans ===
Following up on the ideas of Kicking Away the Ladder, Chang published Bad Samaritans: The Myth of Free Trade and the Secret History of Capitalism in December 2008.

=== 23 Things They Don't Tell You About Capitalism ===
Chang's next book, 23 Things They Don't Tell You About Capitalism, was released in 2011. It offers a twenty-three point rebuttal to aspects of neo-liberal capitalism. This includes assertions such as "Making rich people richer doesn't make the rest of us richer," "Companies should not be run in the interests of their owners," and "The washing machine has changed the world more than the internet has." This book questions the assumptions behind the dogma of neo-liberal capitalism and offers a vision of how we can shape capitalism to humane ends. This marks a broadening of Chang's focus from his previous books that were mainly critiques of neo-liberal capitalism as it related to developing countries. In this book, Chang begins to discuss the issues of the current neo-liberal system across all countries.

=== Economics: The User's Guide ===
Chang's 2014 book, Economics: The User's Guide, is an introduction to economics, written for the general public.

== Publications ==
=== Books ===
- The Political Economy of Industrial Policy (St. Martin's Press; 1994)
- The Transformation of the Communist Economies: Against the Mainstream (Palgrave Macmillan; 1995) ISBN 978-0-33359-709-5
- Financial Liberalization and the Asian Crisis (Palgrave Macmillan; 2001)
- Joseph Stiglitz and the World Bank: The Rebel Within (collection of Stiglitz speeches) (Anthem; 2001) ISBN 978-1-89885-553-8
- Kicking Away The Ladder: Development Strategy in Historical Perspective (Anthem; 2002) ISBN 978-1-84331-027-3
- Globalization, Economic Development, and the Role of the State (essay collection) (Zed Books; 2002) ISBN 978-1-84277-143-3
- Restructuring Korea Inc. (with Jang-Sup Shin) (Routledge; 2003) ISBN 978-0-415-27865-2
- Reclaiming Development: An Alternative Economic Policy Manual (with Ilene Grabel) (Zed; 2004) ISBN 978-1-84277-201-0
- The Politics of Trade and Industrial Policy in Africa: Forced Consensus (edited with Charles Chukwuma Soludo & Osita Ogbu) (Africa World Press; 2004) ISBN 978-1592211654
- Gae-Hyuck Ui Dut (The Reform Trap), Bookie, Seoul, 2004 (collection of essays in Korean)
- Kwe-Do Nan-Ma Hankook-Kyungje (Cutting the Gordian Knot – An Analysis of the Korean Economy) Bookie, Seoul, 2005 (in Korean) (co-author: Seung-il Jeong) ISBN 978-89-85989-83-1
- The East Asian Development Experience: The Miracle, the Crisis and the Future (Zed; 2007) ISBN 978-1-84277-141-9
- Bad Samaritans: The Myth of Free Trade and the Secret History of Capitalism (Bloomsbury; 2008) ISBN 978-1-59691-598-5
- 23 Things They Don't Tell You About Capitalism (Penguin Books Ltd; 2010) ISBN 978-1-60819-166-6
- Economics: The User's Guide (Pelican Books; 2014) ISBN 978-0718197032
- Edible Economics – A Hungry Economist Explains the World, (Pelican Books; 2022) ISBN 9780241534649

=== Papers and articles ===
- Intellectual Property Rights and Economic Development: Historical lessons and emerging issues, TWN, 2001
- Who Benefits from the New International Intellectual Property Rights Regime?: And what Should Africa Do?, ATPSN, 2001
- Economic History of the Developed World: Lessons for Africa Economic History of the Developed World: Lessons for Africa, 2009.
- Industrial Policy: Can Africa do it? , July 2012.
- Institutional Change and Economic Development, Tokyo 2007.
- Kicking Away the Ladder: The "Real" History of Free Trade, Foreign Policy, 30 December 2003
- "Foreign Investment Regulation in Historical Perspective Lessons for the Proposed WTO Investment Agreement", Global Policy, 2003.

== Personal life ==
He is the son of a former minister of industry and resources, Chang Jae-sik, brother of a historian and philosopher of science, Hasok Chang, and cousin of a prominent economist and professor at Korea University, Chang Ha-Seong. He lives in Cambridge with his wife, Hee-Jeong Kim, and two children, Yuna, and Jin-Gyu.

== See also ==
- Capitalism
- Criticism of capitalism
- Miracle on the Han River
