= Late industrialisation =

Alice Amsden, building on the insights of Alexander Gerschenkron, identifies late industrialization as a particular form of industrialization, the study of which is useful for those interested in study of the prospects for material progress in developing countries. Amsden notes that, while the first industrial revolution in the UK towards the end of the eighteenth century and the second industrial revolution 100 years later in Germany and the US both involved new products and processes, countries that did not start industrialization until the 20th century tended to generate neither new products nor processes. These, the late industrializers, raised their income and transformed their productive structures using borrowed technology.

Another take on this would be that the 1st industrial revolution was based on invention, the 2nd on the basis of innovation and more recently the late industrializers are industrializing on the basis of learning.

Amsden uses her thesis of late industrialization to discuss the following countries: South Korea, Taiwan, Brazil, India, possibly Mexico, Turkey, and Japan (although this last country is regarded as special in many respects).

Learning in these countries was achieved through the use of similar institutions, particularly those associated with industrial policy. These learners initially compete via low wages, state subsidies or other forms of government supports, and gradual increases in quality of and efficiency in producing existing products. The shop floor in businesses tends to be the “strategic focus” when competition is based on borrowed technology.

Amsden argues the late industrializers have now moved into the more mature markets of the innovators and the productivity of long-established innovators has been successfully challenged by the learners' lower wages, intense efforts to raise productivity, and firms supported by industrial policy.
