= Developmental state =

Phenomenon of state-led macroeconomic planning in East Asia in the late 20th century

Developmental state, hard state, State-led developmentalism or in some cases Neo-developmental state, is a term used by international political economy scholars to refer to the phenomenon of state-led macroeconomic planning in East Asia in the late 20th century. In this model of capitalism (sometimes referred to as state-development capitalism), the state has more independent, or autonomous, political power, as well as more control over the economy. A developmental state is characterized by having strong state intervention, as well as extensive regulation and planning. The term has subsequently been used to describe countries outside East Asia that satisfy the criteria of a developmental state. The developmental state is sometimes contrasted with a predatory state or weak state.

The first person to seriously conceptualize the developmental state was Chalmers Johnson. Johnson defined the developmental state as a state that is focused on economic development and takes necessary policy measures to accomplish that objective. He argued that Japan's economic development had much to do with far-sighted intervention by bureaucrats, particularly those in the Ministry of International Trade and Industry (MITI). He wrote in his book MITI and the Japanese Miracle:

In states that were late to industrialize, the state itself led the industrialization drive, that is, it took on developmental functions. These two differing orientations toward private economic activities, the regulatory orientation and the developmental orientation, produced two different kinds of business-government relationships. The United States is a good example of a state in which the regulatory orientation predominates, whereas Japan is a good example of a state in which the developmental orientation predominates.

A regulatory state governs the economy mainly through regulatory agencies that are empowered to enforce a variety of standards of behavior to protect the public against market failures of various sorts, including monopolistic pricing, predation, and other abuses of market power, and by providing collective goods (such as national defense or public education) that otherwise would be undersupplied by the market. In contrast, a developmental state intervenes more directly in the economy through a variety of means to promote the growth of new industries and to reduce the dislocations caused by shifts in investment and profits from old to new industries. In other words, developmental states can pursue industrial policies, while regulatory states generally cannot.

Governments in developmental states invest and mobilize the majority of capital into the most promising industrial sector that will have the maximum spillover effect for the society. Cooperation between state and major industries is crucial for maintaining stable macroeconomy. According to Alice Amsden's Getting the Price Wrong, the intervention of state in the market system such as grant of subsidy to improve competitiveness of firm, control of exchange rate, wage level and manipulation of inflation to lowered production cost for industries caused economic growth, that is mostly found in late industrializers countries but foreign to early developed countries.

As in the case of Japan, there is little government ownership of industry, but the private sector is rigidly guided and restricted by bureaucratic government elites. These bureaucratic government elites are not elected officials and are thus less subject to influence by either the corporate-class or working-class through the political process. The argument from this perspective is that a government ministry can have the freedom to plan the economy and look to long-term national interests without having their economic policies disrupted by either corporate-class or working-class short-term or narrow interests.

== Examples in East and Southeast Asia ==
Some of the best prospects for economic growth in the last few decades have been found in East and Southeast Asia. Japan, South Korea, China, Hong Kong, Singapore, India, Thailand, Taiwan, Vietnam, Malaysia, Philippines, and Indonesia are developing at high to moderate levels. Thailand, for example, has grown at double-digit rates most years since the early 1980s. China had been the world leader in economic growth from 2001 to 2015. It is estimated that it took England around 60 years to double its economy when the Industrial Revolution began. It took the United States around 50 years to double its economy during the American economic take-off in the late nineteenth century. Several East and Southeast Asian countries today have been doubling their economies every 10 years.

In most of these Asian countries, it is not just that the rich are getting richer, but the poor are becoming less poor. For example, poverty has dropped dramatically in Thailand. Research in the 1960s showed that 60 percent of the people in Thailand lived below a poverty level estimated with cost of basic necessities. By 2004, however, similar estimates showed that poverty there was around 13 to 15 percent. Thailand has been shown by some World Bank figures to have had the best record for reducing poverty per increase in GNP of any nation in the world.

When viewed through the lens of dependency theory, developmentalism is about countries such as Thailand, Taiwan, Malaysia, Japan, South Korea, and increasingly Vietnam, where the governments are able and willing to protect their people from the negative consequences of foreign corporate exploitation. They tend to have a strong government, also called a "developmental state" or "hard state", and have leaders who can confront multinationals and demand that they operate to protect their people's interests. These "development states" have the will and authority to create and maintain policies that lead to long-term development that helps all their citizens, not just the wealthy. Multinational corporations are regulated so that they may follow domestically mandated standards for pay and labor conditions, pay reasonable taxes, and by extension leave some profits within the country.

Specifically, what is meant by a developmental state is a government with sufficient organization and power to achieve its development goals. There must be a state with the ability to prove consistent economic guidance and rational and efficient organization, and the power to back up its long-range economic policies. All of this is important because the state must be able to resist external demands from outside multinational corporations to do things for their short-term gain, overcome internal resistance from strong groups trying to protect short-term narrow interests, and control infighting within the nation pertaining to who will most benefit from development projects.

=== Thailand ===
In the late 1990s a study was conducted in which the researchers interviewed people from 24 large factories in Thailand owned by Japanese and American corporations. They found that most of the employees in these corporations made more than the average in Thailand, and substantially more than the $4.40 a day minimum wage in the country at the time. The researchers’ analysis of over 1,000 detailed questionnaires indicated that the employees rate their income and benefits significantly above average compared to Thai-owned factories. They found the working conditions in all 24 companies far from conditions reported about Nike in Southeast Asia.

One answer to the discrepancies found between multinational corporations in Thailand and the conditions described for Nike workers is that companies such as Wal-Mart, The Gap, or Nike subcontract work to small local factories. These subcontractors remain more invisible, making it more easy to bribe local officials to maintain poor working conditions. When multinational corporations set up business in countries like Malaysia, Taiwan, or Thailand, their visibility makes much less likely employees will have wages and conditions below the standards of living of the country.

Thailand is said to fall between the U.S. model where government has little involvement in economic policy, and Japan which has governed with a very heavy hand for more than 100 years. One focus of Thai development policies was on import substitution. Here, a development state must be able to tell multinational corporations that goods will be imported, if at all, with tariffs as high as 80 to 150 percent to prevent these goods from competing with goods made in (at least at first) less efficient infant factories in the poorer country. Only a development state can have the influence to enforce such a policy on rich multinational corporations (and their governments), and only a development state can have the influence to enforce such a policy against the demands of their own rich citizens who want the imported goods and want them then at a cheaper price, not waiting for infant industries to produce suitable products. Thailand began placing tariffs of 150 percent on important automobiles, but at the same time telling the foreign auto industries that if they came to Thailand to create joint ventures with a Thai company to build cars—and thus hire Thai employees, pay Thai taxes, and keep some profits within Thailand—the auto company would get many forms of government assistance.

Thailand continued to protect its economy during the 1980s and 1990s despite the flood of foreign investment the nation had attracted. Thai bureaucrats started rules such as those demanding a sufficient percentage of domestic content in goods manufactured by foreign companies in Thailand and the 51 percent rule. Under the 51 percent rule, a multinational corporation starting operations in Thailand must form a joint venture with a Thai company. The result is that a Thai company with 51 percent control is better able to keep jobs and profits in the country. Countries such as Thailand have been able to keep foreign investors from leaving because the government has maintained more infrastructure investment to provide good transportation and a rather educated labor force, enhancing productivity.

=== Singapore ===
Singapore is a relatively young city-state and it obtains a title of developed country. Despite the fact that it has a lack of natural resources and an intensely competitive geographical environment, it has been growing its nation as a developmental state. In 1965, Singapore successfully became independent from Malaysian Federation, and later it changed its Fordism production oriented city state to a developmental city state in less than half a century.

It was claimed by the People's Action Party (PAP), the governing party since 1965, that adopting the developmental state strategy is in Singapore's best interests due to its unique feature of social, political, geographical, and economic conditions. At first, PAP's economic strategy was to provide cheap and disciplined labor and it provides a stable political system; Singapore has only one labor union that is directed by the PAP government. As a result, many multinational corporations (MNCs) invested in Singapore and soon Singapore came to be a solid manufacturing base.

However, the PAP soon realized that if Singapore was to move forward to industrialization then it needed to improve its national education. In the 1960s, Singapore's education was fragmented basically by race, language and habitat lines. Therefore, a series of education projects were launched in the hope of helping Singapore to obtain industrialization. For example, in 1970, the Vocational and Industrial Training Board (VITB) was launched to provide technical education for workers who dropped out of secondary school. Singapore's training programs has a different function from other neoliberal cities; these programs match workers’ skills to the market of economic development. The economy is planned by the government; it arranges the market demand of labor on one hand and provides the supply of labor on the other hand.

The Singapore government has noticed the country's weakness and its special geographical location. It is because that the population of Singapore was much less than other surrounding countries, so soon its manufacturing status would be replaced by other Asian countries like Indonesia, Vietnam, China, etc. Also, other Asian countries could provide relatively cheaper and greater labor force and more raw materials of production could be exploited. Therefore, Singapore was vulnerable of facing such surrounding threats. However, the Singapore government has adopted a special view of new international division of labor; it has placed itself as a global city in the Southeast Asian region. According to Saskia Sassen's "global cities", they are cities where headquarters which are committed in participating of globalization networks and they are the result of strong integration of urbanization and globalization.

=== South Korea ===
South Korea has undergone rapid economic development since the 1961 Military coup which brought Park Chung-Hee to power. Park, a Japanophile who studied at the Imperial Japanese Army Academy during WWII as a Manchukuo Army Officer, viewed Japan's development model, in particular the Ministry of International Trade and Industry (MITI) and the Keiretsu, as an example for Korea. Park emulated MITI by establishing the Ministry of Trade and Industry (MTI) and the Economic Planning Board (EPB) that controlled and manipulated the market system, while organizing the private enterprises into massive export oriented conglomerates which came to be known as the Chaebol's.

Korean government implemented various economic measures in order to pursue export oriented growth. Korea at the early 60s was lacking capital and technological basis, so the only competitive advantage the country had was the low wage. Therefore, Korea first penetrated the global market with cheap labor in the light industry sector such as wigs and cotton spinning in 50s~60s. Korean industrial policy moved towards the heavy and chemical industries in the 70s and 80s, mobilizing the state's financial resources for the rapid growth of industries such as steel and shipbuilding.

During those developmental periods, the government granted various forms of subsidies to the industries. Long-term loans and credits were given for higher competence in global market, thereby increasing export. Foreign exchange rates were often manipulated to stimulate export or import the raw materials at lower cost. Due to such subsidies on exports and manipulation by the government, the relative prices in Korean industry diverged from the free market equilibriums. Such interventions by the state are termed as "deliberately getting relative prices wrong"(Amsden, 1989), which means that the prices are intentionally deviated from the ‘right’ prices, the market equilibrium. Big business groups in chosen industries were supported and invested by the government, thereby forming intimate economic and political ties. Such groups grew to account for a large portion of GNP and became the Chaebols.

South Korea's GDP per capita grew from $876 in 1950 to $22,151 in 2010. Industrial production in South Korea was 9% in 1953 but reached 38% in 2013. Korea first adopted an ISI but followed a developmental state growth strategy. Korea after their independence in 1945 lead to end of economic ties with Japan which they were heavily relied upon. During the Korean war, the country was devastated both physically and mentally. After the Korean war, South Korea focused on exporting primary products such as crops, minerals while imported manufactured goods from US. In the beginning of ISI era, Korean industries were successful in textile and light consumer good industries (Charles, 1975). South Korea eventually focused on an export oriented industries through direct government involvement. South Korean state has more autonomy over the regulation of economy, the state created conditions favorable for rapid economic growth, for example, the state provided long-term loans for industries with higher competence in global market which eventually increased the exporting sector (Chibber, 2014). Under Park Chung Hee's leadership, South Korea in 1960's created Economic Planning Board (EPB) which unified previously divided industries and created a centralized decision making state.

Korea has been called one of "Asia's four little dragons" or Four Asian Tigers with its prominent economic growth (The other three being Taiwan, Hong Kong and Singapore). Korea's GDP per capita in 1980 was $1,778.5, which was only a fraction of Japan's per capita ($9,307.8). In 2014, Korea's GDP was $25,977.0, having shown dramatic growth in the past decade.

=== Japan ===
Japan also experienced rapid economic growth after World War II making Japan own a title that is 'Japanese Economic Miracle'. Such an event happened because the government plays the main role in promoting the economy by focusing on industrialization, making policy focusing on economy growth and others that are align with developmental theories

== Local developmental state ==
While the developmental state is associated with East Asia, it has been argued that after 30 years of many negative experiences with the Washington Consensus, similar structures began to appear in Latin America. The "Latin American" approach is different, however, as it often takes place at a city/municipal level, rather than at a state level and places a great emphasis on tackling social exclusion. One pioneer in this experience has been Medellín, whose experience with a local development state has been highly praised by researchers at the Overseas Development Institute. Medellín's city administration used its ownership of city's main energy provider Empresas Publicas de Medellín (EPM) and diverted 30% of EPM's profits to fund municipal spending. The spending went partly on a variety of infrastructure projects, such as the city's metro, bus network and a cable car system connecting the poorer barrio communities to the city centre. However, the city also developed a program of cash grants called 'the Medellín Solidaria' programme that are very similar to Brazil's highly successful Bolsa Familia that provide support for poor families. Additionally, the city developed the Cultura E programme that established a network of 14 publicly funded business support centres known as CEDEZO, Centros de Desarrollo Empresarial Zonal. The CEDEZOs are found in the poorest areas of Medellín and support the poor in developing business by providing free-of-charge business support services and technical advice. Also, as part of Cultura E, there is Banco de las Opportunidades that provides microloans (up to $2,500 at a cheap interest rates 0.91% monthly). This has helped create more equal opportunities for all and overcome the barriers to entry to business for poor entrepreneurs with good ideas, but lacking capital, skills and connections. It has also helped develop the local economy with new micro-enterprises. However, several mayoral candidates for the October 2011 elections have argued the Banco de las Opportunidades's interest rates are too high, loan maturity is too short and it should have grace periods. They therefore suggest a new small and medium-sized enterprise (SME) development bank to complement the Banco de las Opportunidades.

=== Difficulties ===
There are difficulties with the local development state model. Despite claims at the end of the 1980s by some, such as Hernando de Soto (1989) that micro-enterprises would lead economic growth, this has not come to pass. For instance, in Medellín the informal sector has seen a huge growth in micro-enterprises, but the impact on poverty and development has been minimal. Almost none of these microenterprises have evolved into informal small or medium businesses, as the demand does not exist to absorb increased production. In other words, a successful ice-cream producer producing 30 ice-creams per day at home may sell all their product and make a livelihood out of it, but transforming it into a business, incurring the costs of mechanisation in order to produce perhaps 300, may not be worthwhile if there is no demand for so many ice-creams. Failure rates are very high and the debt incurred by owners becomes unmanageable. Recognising which micro-enterprises have a high potential is extremely difficult and the costs involved in providing business support and advise are very high. There is a great difficulty in identifying demand, especially on a global level and demand patterns are constantly changing. The limited ability of city administrations to gather enough resources to support businesses and make sound investments can be problematic.

== Public recognition ==
Despite all the evidence of the importance of a development state, some international aid agencies have just recently publicly recognized the fact. The United Nations Development Program, for example, published a report in April 2000 which focused on good governance in poor countries as a key to economic development and overcoming the selfish interests of wealthy elites often behind state actions in developing nations. The report concludes that “Without good governance, reliance on trickle-down economic development and a host of other strategies will not work.”

== See also ==
- Dirigisme
- East Asian model of capitalism
- Economic development
- Economic interventionism
- Flying geese paradigm
- Four Asian Tigers
- Good governance
- International political economy
- Japanese post-war economic miracle
- Poverty reduction
- State capitalism

== Sources ==
- Meredith Woo-Cumings. (1999). The Developmental State. Cornell University Press.
- Peter Evans. (1995). Embedded Autonomy: States and Industrial Transformation. Princeton: Princeton University Press. Ch. 1.
- Polidano C. (2001). Don't Discard State Autonomy: Revisiting the East Asia Experience of Development. Political Studies. Vol. 49. No.3. 1: 513–527.
- Ziya Onis. (1991). The Logic of the Developmental State. Comparative Politics. 24. no. 1. pp. 109–26.
- Mark Thompson. (1996). Late industrialisers, late democratisers: developmental states in the Asia-Pacific. Third World Quarterly. 17(4): 625–647.
- John Minns. (2001). Of miracles and models: the rise and decline of the developmental state in South Korea. Third World Quarterly. 22(6): 1025–1043.
- Joseph Wong. (2004). The adaptive developmental state in East Asia. Journal of East Asian Studies. 4: 345–362.
- Yun Tae Kim. (1999). Neoliberalism and the decline of the developmental state. Journal of Contemporary Asia. 29(4): 441–461.
- Linda Weiss. (2000). Developmental States in Transition: adapting, dismantling, innovating, not 'normalising'. Pacific Review. 13(1): 21–55.
- Robert Wade. (2003). What strategies are viable for developing countries today? The World Trade Organization and the shrinking of 'development space'. Review of International Political Economy. 10 (4). pp. 621–644.
- Daniel Maman and Zeev Rosenhak.(2011). The Institutional Dynamics of a Developmental State: Change and Continuity in State Economy Relations in Israel. Working paper No. 5–2011 of the Research Institute for Policy, Political Economy and Society. Raanana: The Open university of Israel.
- Ming Wan. (2008). "The Political Economy of East Asia". CQ Press.
- Rajiv Kumar. (2021). Bringing the developmental state back in: explaining South Korea's successful management of COVID-19. Third World Quarterly. 42(7):1397-1416.
