= Economic strategy =

Economic strategy may refer to:

- Marketing strategy
- Strategic management
- Economic policy
- Industrial policy
