= 23 Things They Don't Tell You About Capitalism =

2010 non-fiction book by Ha-Joon Chang

- First edition
- Author: Ha-Joon Chang
- Language: English
- Subject: Economics; Sociology
- Genre: Non-fiction
- Publisher: Penguin
- Publication date: 2010
- Media type: Paperback
- Pages: 304
- ISBN: 978-0-14104-797-3

23 Things They Don't Tell You About Capitalism is a 2010 non-fiction book by economist Ha-Joon Chang. The book offers a 23-point rebuttal of aspects of neo-liberal capitalism.

== Summary ==
Chang wrote 23 Things They Don't Tell You About Capitalism in the aftermath of the 2008 financial crisis which he argues exemplifies his criticism of globalisation and free trade.

The book's criticisms range from more commonplace assertions such as "companies should not be run in the interests of their owners" to less common specific arguments such as "the washing machine has changed the world more than the internet has".

After listing the 23 criticisms, Chang concludes in a section called "How to rebuild the world economy". He advocates a system of capitalism in which the government has a higher degree of control over the economy and wariness towards the neo-liberal version of capitalism with minimal government involvement which he argues caused the 2008 financial crisis.

== Reception ==
John Gray of The Guardian said in his review that it "masterfully debunked the myths of capitalism".

Sean O'Grady of The Independent argues that 23 Things They Don't Tell You About Capitalism is testament to the ability of economically poorer nations becoming more powerful over time. Writing in the Financial Times, James Crabtree describes the points of Chang's rebuttal as ranging from "conventional left-wing claims" to "counter-intuitive ones" and highlights the close relationship between the rebuttal points and criticisms following the 2008 financial crisis.

However, James Hannam, writing in the Huffington Post, re-visited the book three years after its publication and commented that many of the aspects Chang attacks are "straw-men", such as the claim that we do not have a free market due to the restriction of slavery, which Hannam criticises as a misrepresentation of capitalist claims because very few capitalists argue for a completely free market. Hannam summarises that the most valuable aspect of the book is its "insight into how left wing economists are trying to come to terms with the failure of socialism".

Business Insider's review of the book, written by Hannah Kim and Gregory White, argues that while Chang criticises the flaws of capitalism, he accepts that a modified version with more oversight is the best economic system.

== See also ==
- Criticism of capitalism
