= Industrial policy =

Government strategy promoting industrial development

Industrial policy is proactive government-led encouragement and development of specific strategic industries for the growth of all or part of the economy, especially in absence of sufficient private sector investments and participation. Historically, it has often focused on the manufacturing sector, militarily important sectors, or on fostering an advantage in new technologies. In industrial policy, the government takes measures "aimed at improving the competitiveness and capabilities of domestic firms and promoting structural transformation". A country's infrastructure (including transportation, telecommunications and energy industry) is a major enabler of industrial policy.

Industrial policies are interventionist measures typical of mixed economy countries. Many types of industrial policies contain common elements with other types of interventionist practices such as trade policy. Industrial policy is usually seen as separate from broader macroeconomic policies, such as tightening credit and taxing capital gains. Traditional examples of industrial policy include subsidizing export industries and import-substitution-industrialization (ISI), where trade barriers are temporarily imposed on some key sectors, such as manufacturing. By selectively protecting certain industries, these industries are given time to learn (learning by doing) and upgrade. Once competitive enough, these restrictions are lifted to expose the selected industries to the international market. More contemporary industrial policies include measures such as support for linkages between firms and support for upstream technologies. Public procument can support industrial development by creating demand for domestic products and helping firms build production and technological capabilities.

Economists have debated the role of industrial policy in fostering industrialization and economic development. They have also debated concerns that industrial policy threatens free trade and international cooperation.

== History ==
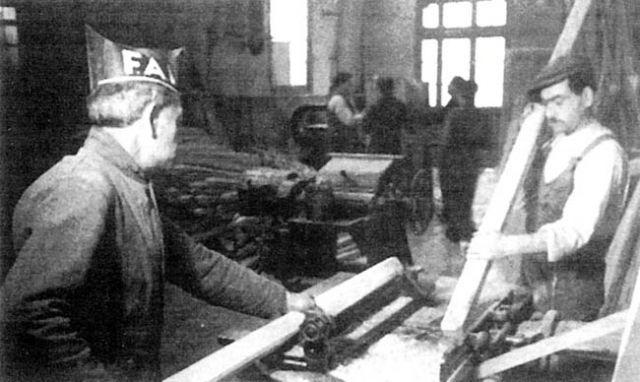
CNT-FAI worker cooperative in Barcelona producing wood and steel products

The traditional arguments for industrial policies go back as far as the 18th century. Prominent early arguments in favor of selective protection of industries were contained in the 1791 Report on the Subject of Manufactures of US statesman Alexander Hamilton, as well as the work of German economist Friedrich List. List's views on free trade were in explicit contradiction to those of Adam Smith, who, in The Wealth of Nations, said that "the most advantageous method in which a landed nation can raise up artificers, manufacturers, and merchants of its own is to grant the most perfect freedom of trade to the artificers, manufacturers, and merchants of all other nations."

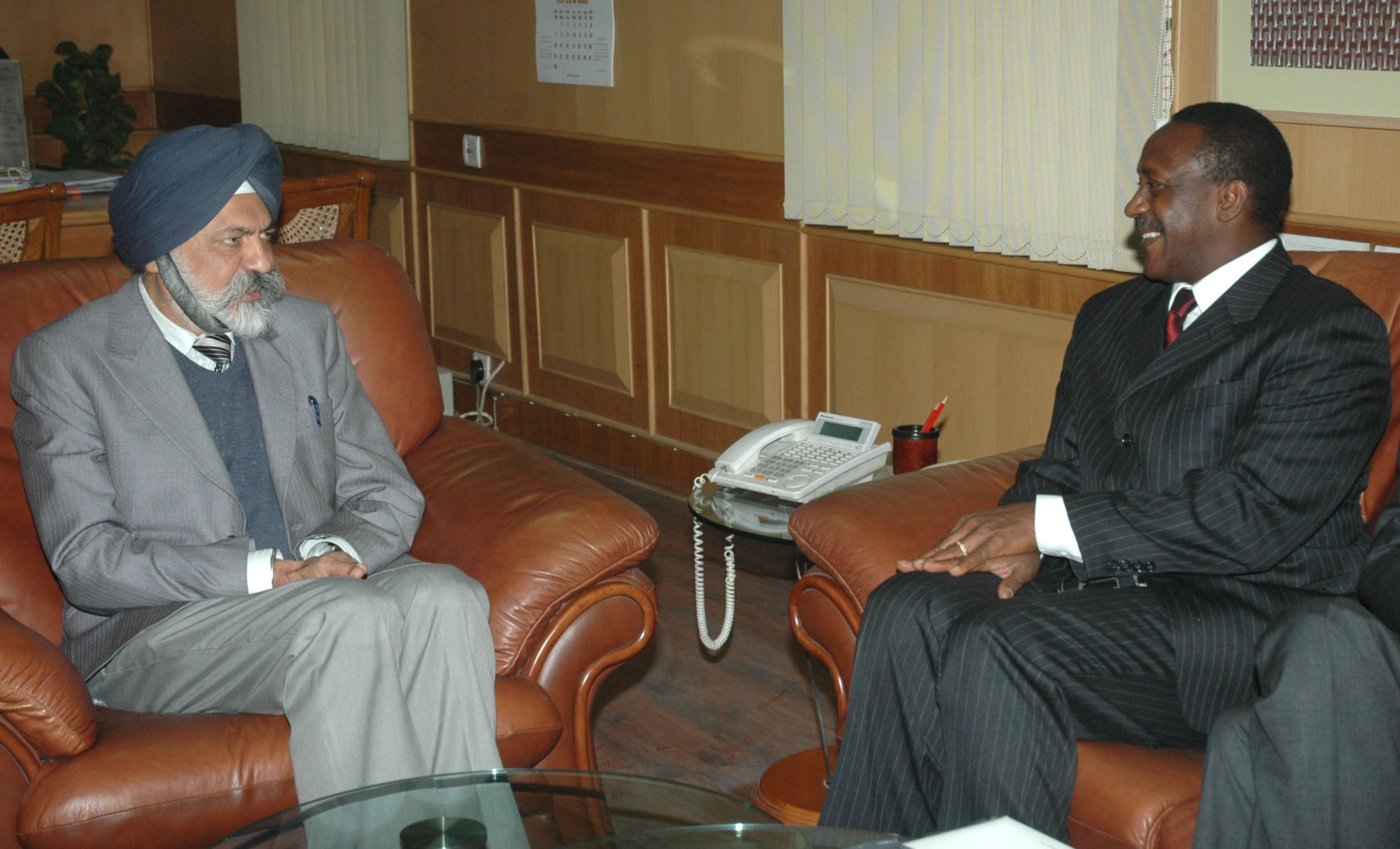
Kandeh Yumkella meeting Department for Promotion of Industry secretary Shri R.P. Singh, 2010 New Delhi

According to NYU historians Prince & Taylor, "The relationship between government and industry in the United States has never been a simple one, and the labels used in categorizing these relationships at different times are often misleading if not false. In the early nineteenth century, for example, it is quite clear that the laissez faire label is an inappropriate one." In the US, an industrial policy was explicitly presented for the first time by the Jimmy Carter administration in August 1980, but it was subsequently dismantled with the election of Ronald Reagan the following year.

Historically, there is a growing consensus that most developed countries, including United Kingdom, United States, Germany, and France, have intervened actively in their domestic economy through industrial policies. These early examples are followed by interventionist ISI strategies pursued in Latin American countries such as Brazil, Mexico or Argentina. More recently, the rapid growth of East Asian economies, or the newly industrialized countries (NICs), has also been associated with active industrial policies that selectively promoted manufacturing and facilitated technology transfer and industrial upgrading. The success of these state-directed industrialization strategies are often attributed to developmental states and strong bureaucracies such as the Japanese MITI. According to Princeton's Atul Kohli, the reason Japanese colonies such as South Korea developed so rapidly and successfully was down to Japan exporting to its colonies the same centralised state development that it had used to develop itself. Precisely speaking, South Korea's development can be explained by the fact that it followed the similar industrial policies that UK, US and Germany implemented, and South Korea adopted Export-Oriented Industrialization (EOI) policy from 1964 based on its own decision contrary to the Import Substitution Industrialization (ISI) policy touted by international aid organizations and experts at that time. Many of these domestic policy choices, however, are now seen as detrimental to free trade and are hence limited by various international agreements such as WTO TRIMs or TRIPS. Instead, the recent focus for industrial policy has shifted towards the promotion of local business clusters and the integration into global value chains.

During the Reagan administration, an economic development initiative called Project Socrates was initiated to address US decline in ability to compete in world markets. Project Socrates, directed by Michael Sekora, resulted in a computer-based competitive strategy system that was made available to private industry and all other public and private institutions that impact economic growth, competitiveness and trade policy. A key objective of Socrates was to utilize advanced technology to enable US private institutions and public agencies to cooperate in the development and execution of competitive strategies without violating existing laws or compromising the spirit of "free market". President Reagan was satisfied that this objective was fulfilled in the Socrates system. Through the advances of innovation age technology, Socrates would provide "voluntary" but "systematic" coordination of resources across multiple "economic system" institutions including industry clusters, financial service organizations, university research facilities and government economic planning agencies. While the view of one US president and the Socrates team was that technology made it virtually possible for both to exist simultaneously, the industrial policy vs. free market debate continued as later under the George H. W. Bush administration, Socrates was labeled as industrial policy and de-funded.

After the 2008 financial crisis, countries including the US, UK, Australia, Japan and most countries of the European Union adopted industry policies. However contemporary industry policy generally accepts globalization as a given, and focuses less on the decline of older industries, and more on the growth of emergent industries. It often involves the government working collaboratively with industry to respond to challenges and opportunities. China is a prominent case where the central and subnational governments participate in nearly all economic sectors and processes. Even though market mechanisms have gained importance, state guidance through state-directed investment and indicative planning plays a substantial role in the economy. In order to catch-up and even overtake industrialized countries technologically, China's "state activities even extend to efforts to prevent the dominance of foreign investors and technologies in areas considered to be of key significance such as the strategic industries and the new technologies" including robotics and new energy vehicles.

== Debates ==
There is a consensus in recent development theory that says state interventions may be necessary when market failures occur. Market failures often exist in the form of externalities and natural monopolies. Some economists argue that public action can boost certain development factors "beyond what market forces on their own would generate." In practice, these interventions are often aimed at regulating networks, public infrastructure, R&D or correcting information asymmetries. Many countries are now seeing a revival of industrial policy.

Some criticize industrial policy based on the concept of government failure. Industrial policy is seen as harmful as governments lack the required information, capabilities, and incentives to successfully determine whether the benefits of promoting certain sectors above others exceeds the costs and in turn implement the policies. While the East Asian Tigers provided successful examples of heterodox interventions and protectionist industrial policies, industrial policies such as import-substitution-industrialization (ISI) have failed in many other regions such as Latin America and Sub-Saharan Africa. Governments, in making decisions with regard to electoral or personal incentives, can be captured by vested interests, leading to industrial policies supporting local rent-seeking political elites while distorting the efficient allocation of resources by market forces.

Debate also surrounds the issue of whether government failures are more pervasive and severe than market failures. Some argue that the lower the government accountability and capabilities, the higher the risk of political capture of industrial policies, which may be economically more harmful than existing market failures.

One question is which kinds of industrial policy are most effective in promoting economic development. For example, economists debate whether developing countries should focus on their comparative advantage by promoting mostly resource- and labor-intensive products and services, or invest in higher-productivity industries, which may only become competitive in the longer term. Strategic industries can be selected based on their potential to generate value added, create backward and forward linkages with other sectors, encourage learning by doing, and develop technological capabilites. Of particular relevance for developing countries are the conditions under which industrial policies may also contribute to poverty reduction, such as a focus on specific industries or the promotion of linkages between larger companies and smaller local enterprises.

The tax policy approach to industrial policy by reducing taxes for selected market sectors has been argued to avoid the problem of the government "picking winners".

== Effects ==
A study conducted by Réka Juhász investigated the economic effect of the Continental Blockade on the French empire. It concluded that the regions of the French empire which were more protected from trade with the United Kingdom had a higher increase in mechanized cotton spinning than other regions.

During the 2000s, China had implemented an industrial policy targeting its shipbuilding industry. The policy consisted in subsidizing entry, investment and production. It increased sectoral investment and entry rate by 270% and 200% respectively. It led to the entry of small and less productive firms and created excess capacity. The gain in producer or consumer surplus was lower than the cost of the subsidies. The policy was therefore welfare-reducing.

A 2025 study challenged the notion that industrial policy can have transformative economic effects. According to the authors, "our estimates imply that even under the optimistic assumption that governments maximize welfare and have full knowledge of the underlying economy, gains from optimal industrial policy are hardly transformative, ranging from an average across countries of 1.08% of GDP in our baseline analysis to 4.06% in the general environment with physical capital and input-output linkages."

== See also ==
- Green industrial policy
- Chaebol
- Developmental state
- Import substitution industrialization
- Infant industry argument
- Ministry of International Trade and Industry
- The Lucas Plan

== Sources ==
- Altenburg, Tilman (2011). Industrial Policy in Developing Countries: Overview and lessons from seven country cases (PDF). Bonn: German Development Institute. ISBN 978-3-889-85533-6.
- Amsden, Alice H. (1992). Asia's Next Giant: South Korea and Late Industrialization. Oxford: Oxford University Press. ISBN 978-0-195-07603-5.
- Bingham, Richard D. (1998). Industrial Policy American Style: From Hamilton to HDTV. Armonk, NY: M.E. Sharpe. ISBN 978-1-563-24596-1.
- Carey, Mathew (1826). Cursory View of the Liberal and Restrictive Systems of Political Economy. Philadelphia, PA: J. R. A. Skerrett.
- Chang, Ha-Joon (2002). Kicking Away the Ladder: Development Strategy in Historical Perspective: Policies and Institutions for Economic Development in Historical Perspective. London: Anthem Press. ISBN 978-1-843-31027-3.
- Cimoli, Mario; Dosi, Giovanni; Stiglitz, Joseph E., eds. (2009). Industrial Policy and Development: The Political Economy of Capabilities Accumulation. Oxford: Oxford University Press. ISBN 978-0-199-23526-1.
- Dobbin, Frank. Forging Industrial Policy: The United States, Britain and France in the Railway Age. Cambridge: Cambridge University Press 1994
- Gereffi, Gary; Wyman, Donald L. (1990). Manufacturing Miracles: Paths of Industrialization in Latin America and East Asia. Princeton, NJ: Princeton University Press. ISBN 978-0-691-02297-0.
- Graham, Otis L. (1994). Losing Time: The Industrial Policy Debate. Cambridge, MA: Harvard University Press. ISBN 978-0-674-53935-8.
- Hamilton, Alexander (1827) [1791]. "Report on the Subject of Manufactures". Philadelphia, PA: William Brown.
- Heilmann, Sebastian, ed. (2017). China's Political System. Rowman & Littlefield. ISBN 978-1-4422-7736-6. Archived from the original on 2017-04-26.
- Humphrey, John; Schmitz, Hubert (2000). Governance and Upgrading: Linking Industrial Cluster and Global Value Chain Research. Institute of Development Studies. ISBN 1-8586-4334-1.
- Johnson, Chalmers (1982). MITI and the Japanese Miracle: The Growth of Industrial Policy, 1925–1975. Stanford, CA: Stanford University Press. ISBN 0-8047-1128-3.
- Kaufmann, Friedrich; Krause, Matthias (2009). "Industrial Policy in Mozambique" (PDF). German Development Institute. Archived from the original (PDF) on 18 October 2012.
- Khan, Mushtaq H. (2003). "State Failure in Developing Countries and Strategies of Institutional Reform" (PDF). In B. Tungodden; N. Stern; I. Kolstad (eds.). Toward Pro-Poor Policies: Aid, Institutions, and Globalization. Oxford University Press and World Bank. pp. 165–195.
- Koh, Jae Myong (2018). Green Infrastructure Financing: Institutional Investors, PPPs and Bankable Projects, London: Palgrave Macmillan. ISBN 978-3-319-71769-2.
- Kohli, Atul (2004). State-Directed Development: Political Power and Industrialization in the Global Periphery. Cambridge: Cambridge University Press. ISBN 978-0-521-54525-9.
- Krugman, Paul (1987). "The narrow moving band, the Dutch disease, and the competitive consequences of Mrs. Thatcher" (PDF). Journal of Development Economics. 27 (1–2): 41–55. doi:10.1016/0304-3878(87)90005-8. Archived from the original (PDF) on 2012-09-11.
- Lin, Justin; Chang, Ha-Joon (2009). "Should Industrial Policy in Developing Countries Conform to Comparative Advantage or Defy it? A Debate Between Justin Lin and Ha-Joon Chang" (PDF). Development Policy Review. 27 (5): 483–502. doi:10.1111/j.1467-7679.2009.00456.x. S2CID 17063817.
- List, Friedrich (1909) [1841]. The National System of Political Economy. London: Longmans, Green, and Co.
- McKenzie, Richard B. (2002). "Industrial Policy". In David R. Henderson (ed.). Concise Encyclopedia of Economics (1st ed.). Library of Economics and Liberty. OCLC 317650570, 50016270, 163149563
- Okuno-Fujiwara, Masahiro (1991). "Industrial Policy in Japan: A Political Economy View" (PDF). In Paul Krugman (ed.). Trade with Japan: Has the Door Opened Wider?. Chicago, IL: University of Chicago Press. pp. 271–304. ISBN 0-226-45458-4.
- Pack, Howard; Saggi, Kamal (2006). The case for industrial policy: a critical survey (PDF). World Bank.
- Prince, Carl E.; Taylor, Seth (1982). "Daniel Webster, the Boston Associates, and the U.S. Government's Role in the Industrializing Process, 1815–1830". Journal of the Early Republic. 2 (3): 283–299. doi:10.2307/3122975. JSTOR 3122975.
- Rodrik, Dani (2004). "Industrial Policy for the Twenty-First Century". Industrial Policy for the 21st Century. UNIDO. Archived from the original on 12 May 2013.
- Rodrik, Dani (2009). "Industrial Policy: Don't Ask Why, Ask How". Middle East Development Journal. 1 (1): 1–29. doi:10.1142/S1793812009000024. S2CID 155012777.
- Smith, Adam (1776). An Inquiry into the Nature and Causes of the Wealth of Nations. London: W Strahan and T Cadell.
- UNCTAD; UNIDO (2011). "Economic Development in Africa Report 2011: Fostering Industrial Development in Africa in the New Global Environment" (PDF). United Nations.
- Wade, Robert (2003). Governing the Market: Economic Theory and the Role of Government in East Asian Industrialization. Princeton, NJ: Princeton University Press. ISBN 978-0-691-11729-4.
