= Oxford Development Studies =

- Discipline: Development studies
- Language: English
- Edited by: Cheryl R. Doss

Publication details
- Former names: Farm Economist, Oxford Agrarian Studies
- History: 1933-present
- Publisher: Routledge
- Frequency: Quarterly
- Open access: Hybrid

Standard abbreviations
- ISO 4: Oxf. Dev. Stud.

Indexing
- ISSN: 1360-0818 (print); 1469-9966 (web)
- LCCN: 96659552
- OCLC no.: 728408973

Links
- Journal homepage; Online access; Online archive

Oxford Development Studies is a quarterly peer-reviewed academic journal published by Routledge that covers all aspects of development studies. The journal provides a forum for rigorous and critical analysis of the processes of social, political, and economic change that characterise development. ODS publishes articles grounded in one or more regions of the world as well as comparative studies, and is open to work that is interdisciplinary or rooted in a single discipline. The journal provides an outlet for contributions to development theory and for original empirical analyses, both quantitative and qualitative, as well as mixed methods. The editor-in-chief is Cheryl R. Doss (University of Oxford).

== History ==
The journal was established in 1933 as the Farm Economist. In 1972 it was renamed Oxford Agrarian Studies, obtaining its current name in 1996. Previous editors have included George Peters, Sanjaya Lall, and John Toye.

== Abstracting and indexing ==
The journal is abstracted and indexed by CAB Abstracts, EconLit, Geographical Abstracts, Human Geography, and International Bibliography of Periodical Literature.

== Prizes ==
The journal awards two prizes: an annual prize of £500 for the best article published in the journal in the preceding year's issue and a £1000 prize every other year for the best article by a student published in the previous two years' issues. The prizes honour the memory of the distinguished development economist Sanjaya Lall, who was a former editor of the journal and who died in 2005.
