= Bad Samaritans (book) =

2007 economics book by Ha-Joon Chang

Bad Samaritans: The Myth of Free Trade and the Secret History of Capitalism
- Author: Ha-Joon Chang
- Published: 2007
- Publisher: Bloomsbury Press
- Publication place: United States
- ISBN: 978-1596915985

Bad Samaritans: The Myth of Free Trade and the Secret History of Capitalism is a book about economics written by Ha-Joon Chang, a South Korean institutional economist specializing in development economics. It criticizes mainstream economics of globalization and neo-liberalism. Chang claims that developed countries want developing countries to change their economic policy and open their markets. Rich and powerful governments and institutions are actually "Bad Samaritans"; their intentions may be worthy, but their simplistic, free-market ideology and poor understanding of history lead them into policy errors.

== Summary ==
Chang argues that Thomas Friedman's book The Lexus and the Olive Tree (1999) presents an uncomfortable truth of capitalism and criticized globalization. He argues that there are errors in prevailing theories of economic development and refutes them with economic theory, historical perspective, and current data. Chief among those errors is the argument that Britain's and America's 19th-century free-trade policies projected them into market dominance. On the contrary, Chang shows that western economies aggressively implemented protectionist policies and then, only when it was safe and beneficial to them, turned around to force developing countries to adopt free trade. Chang also claims that "Market and democracy clash at the fundamental level." In the epilogue, he writes about a fictionalized Brazil in 2037 that faces a gloomy future as a consequence of reckless beliefs in neo-liberal policies. Finally, he makes the case for new strategies to create a more prosperous world.

== Critical reception ==
The book was criticized by William Easterly, Professor of economics at New York University, for his overemphasis on protectionism as a prerequisite for growth, stating that there is no consensus among economists on the "set of policies that can be guaranteed to ignite sustained growth". He argued that Chang only focuses on those countries that succeeded through protectionism while ignoring the failures. He praised Chang for correctly pointing out that "there were more departures from laissez-faire in American and European history than some ideologues would like to admit" but criticised it for the failure to mention that "average per capita growth rate in the US, regardless of the policy direction, has been remarkably stable for two centuries" when US trade policy swung back and forth between protectionism and free trade and the fact that rich countries have often protected agriculture rather than industry.

Antoine Cerisier in Social Justice wrote that "Despite largely favourable reviews, the book has been criticized in the Financial Times and The Economist. Critics argued that empirical evidence usually supports the main argument put forward by free-trade economists, namely that trade liberalization is good for growth and development. In a 2002 journal article entitled “Growth is good for the poor,” Dollar & Kraay concluded that free trade triggers growth and helps alleviate poverty in the global South. Nonetheless, as Chang would respond, it is probably the opposite: states are more willing to liberalize trade once they reach a certain level of economic development. The journalist admits that the East Asian example can illustrate the use of protectionism and state intervention in the economy."

The Economist reviewer stated that the book presents the writer's personal reflection and rhetorical set-pieces. The book aims to "discomfort neoliberals." The review criticized the author for a "shaky grip on the historical record." The review concludes that the book is an interesting, if controversial, addition to the ongoing "200-year duel between the Hamiltonian's and the liberals".

In the Washington Post review, Paul Blustein, a journalist in the Global Economy and Development Program at the Brookings Institution, wrote, “Chang's book deserves a wide readership for illuminating the need for humility about the virtues of private markets and free trade, especially in the developing world.”

Tom Gallagher in the San Francisco Chronicle claimed that free market ideology has been enforced by today's dominant countries, and they are "kicking the ladder" that they had climbed out of poverty, thereby preventing poor countries from climbing that ladder. He concludes the review by saying that developing countries "have to defy the market".

=== South Korea ===
In 2008, Bad Samaritans was included on a list of 23 "seditious" books released by the Ministry of National Defense of South Korea. The listed books cannot be read or kept on a military base. The ministry argued that it might cause misunderstanding among the readers about the free market economy. The army argued that the book promotes anti-government and anti-American ideology.

American linguist Noam Chomsky said, "It is unfortunate that the Ministry of National Defense is afraid of freedom and is trying to control people." He also said, "The name of the Ministry of National Defense should be changed to Ministry of Defense against Freedom and Democracy.”

In South Korea, in OhmyNews, Gabsoo Kim said that Bad Samaritans pointed out the errors of a global standard that leading countries like the US use to compel a developing country to adopt the liberal market economy. Kim mentioned the book as very pro-capitalistic, as Chang is a scholar who thoroughly trusts capitalism. He considers the book perfectly timed with neo-liberalism being confronted with serious challenges by the financial crisis.
