= Ajit Singh (economist) =

Indian-born economist and professor of Economics

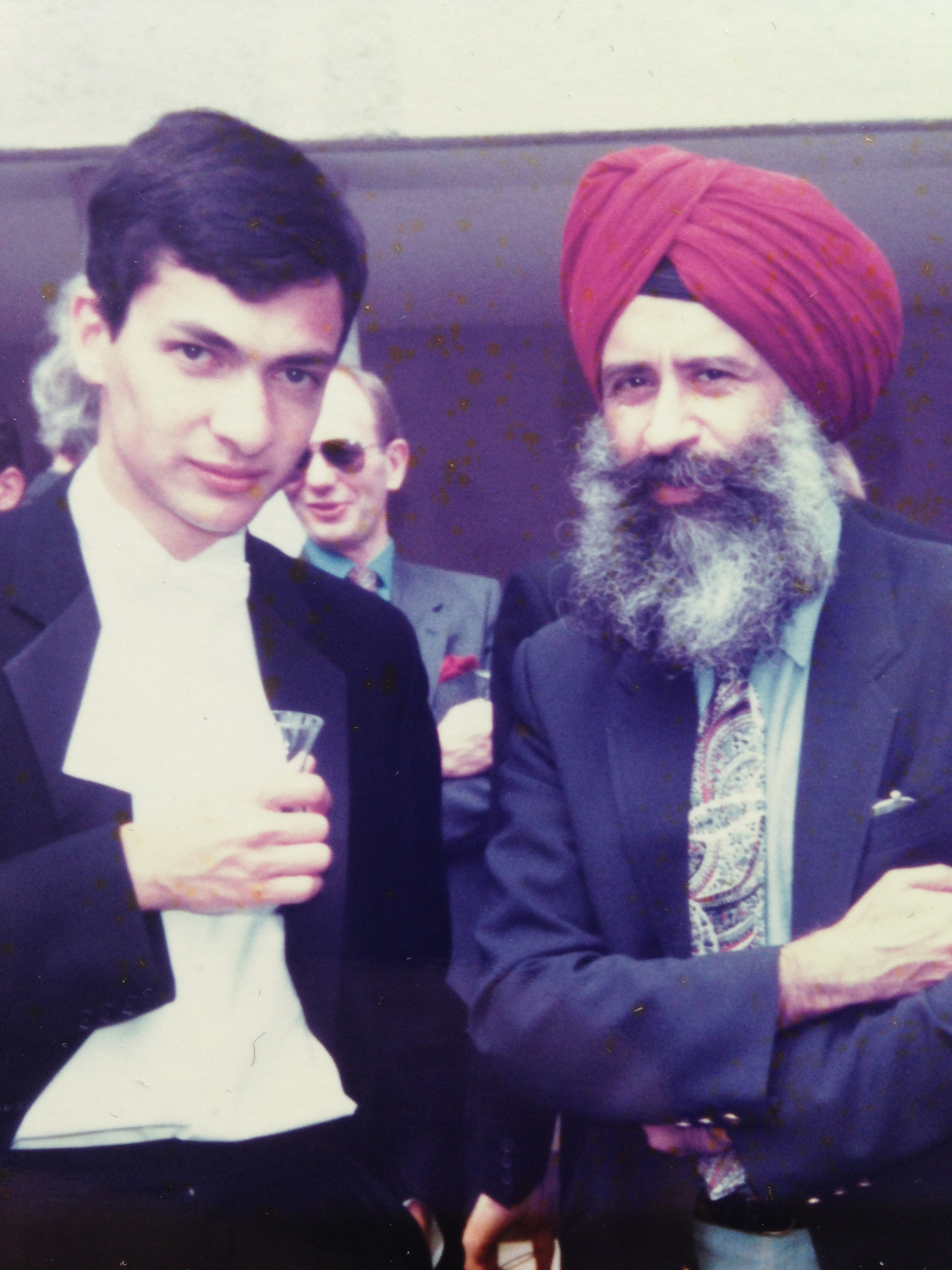
- Ajit Singh and Nigel Cumberland
- Born: 11 September 1940; Lahore, British India
- Died: 23 June 2015 (aged 74); Cambridge, United Kingdom
- Spouses: Jo Bradley; Ann Zammit

Academic background
- Education: Punjab University; Howard University; University of California, Berkeley
- Doctoral advisor: Dale W. Jorgenson

Academic work
- Discipline: Economist
- Institutions: University of Cambridge
- Awards: Glory of India Award, 2011
- Website: Information at IDEAS / RePEc

Ajit Singh (11 September 1940 – 23 June 2015) was an Indian-born Professor of Economics at Cambridge University. One of the world's most renowned Indian-born economists, Singh made fundamental academic contributions in the areas of modern business enterprise, de-industrialisation in advanced and emerging economies and the globalisation of financial and product markets.

== Early life and education ==
Singh was born in Lahore in pre-partition India, and graduated with a B.A. in mathematics and economics from Punjab University in 1958. He obtained an M.A. in economics from Howard University in 1960, and a PhD in economics at the University of California, Berkeley in 1970. One of his life-long friendships was with former Indian Prime Minister Manmohan Singh. He had been a student of Dr. Manmohan Singh as an undergraduate at Punjab University.

== Career ==
Singh was appointed as a member of the faculty of economics at University of Cambridge in 1965 and became a fellow of Queens' College.

Professor Singh published 17 books and monographs, and more than 200 research papers, of which nearly 100 are in refereed economic journals, including leading ones such as the Economic Journal, The Review of Economic Studies, European Economic Review, and the Journal of Economic Literature. Most of Singh's non-journal articles have also been peer-reviewed and included in important collections of handbooks produced by leading publishers such as Oxford University Press, or are included in books edited by Nobel Prize-winning economists such as Amartya Sen, Joseph Stiglitz and Oliver Williamson.

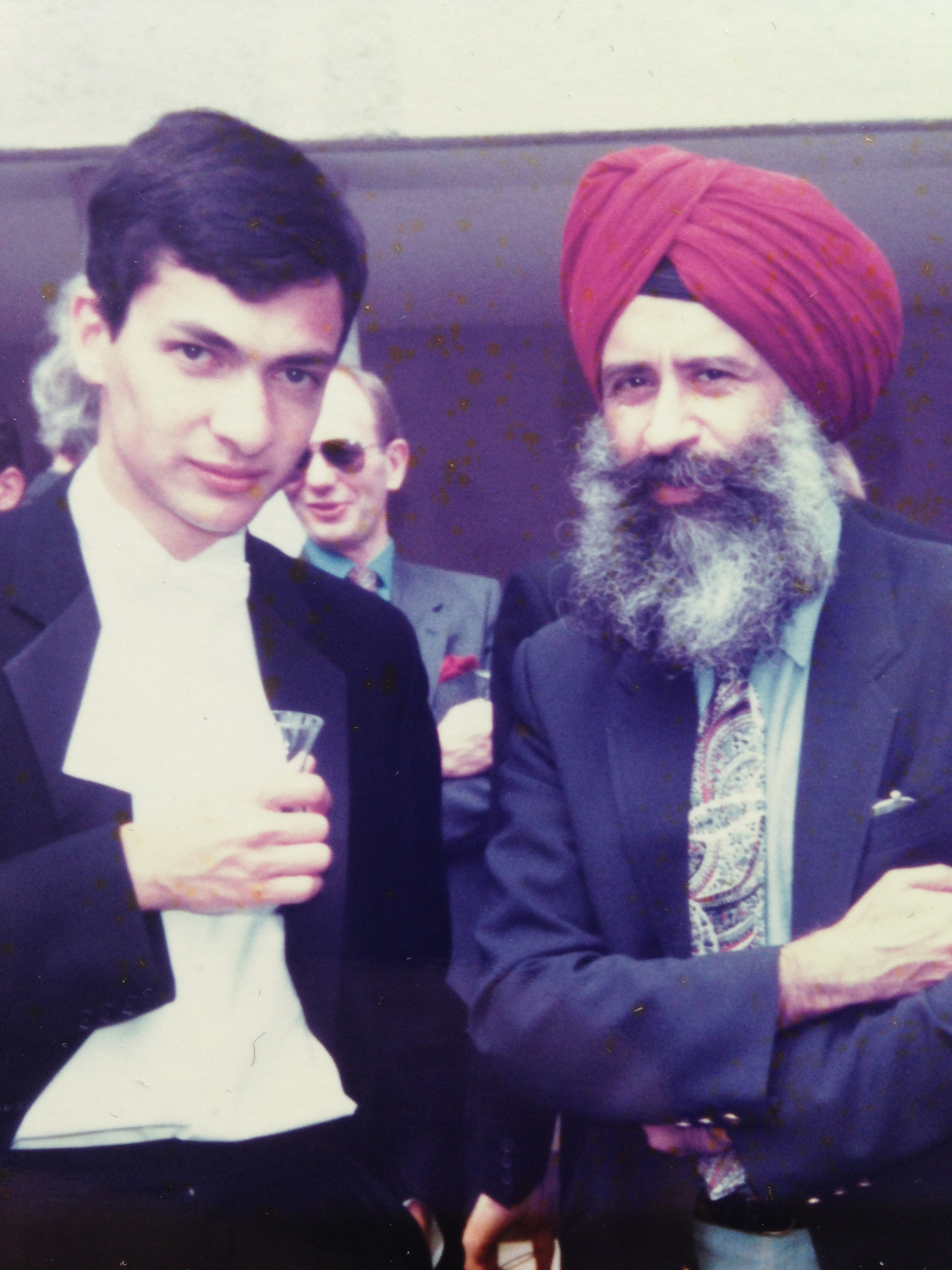
Singh at the 1989 graduation of the Economics BA(Hons) graduates at Queens' College with one of his graduating students, Nigel Cumberland

After his mandatory retirement at the age of 67 as Professor of Economics at Cambridge, Singh was appointed Director of Research at the Cambridge Endowment for Research in Finance (CERF). Since then, Singh was actively engaged in the lecturing and teaching programme of the Centre for Development Studies in Cambridge. In 2011, Singh was the fifth holder of the prestigious Tun Ismail Ali Chair at the University of Malaya. In 2012, he was appointed to the highly prestigious Chair, named after the current Indian Prime Minister, Dr Manmohan Singh. He has been a senior economic adviser to the governments of Mexico and Tanzania and has advised almost all of the UN developmental agencies, including the International Labour Organization, United Nations Conference on Trade and Development, UNIDO, the World Bank and the International Finance Corporation. Singh was elected an Academician of the UK Academy of Social Sciences in 2004. In 2008, he was inducted into the Hall of Fame of the Department of Economics of Howard University, Washington, D.C., and in November 2010 he received the Glory of India Award for 'individual excellence, excellent performance and outstanding contribution for the progress of the nation and worldwide'.

== Personal life ==
Singh was diagnosed with Parkinson's disease in 1982, when he was just 42.

His first marriage, to Jo Bradley, ended in divorce in 2012. Singh was the brother-in-law of the distinguished Oxford development economist Sanjaya Lall.

Singh died at his home in Newnham, Cambridge on 23 June 2015. He was survived by sisters Parveen and Rani as well as Ann Zammit, a longtime collaborator who in his final days became his second wife.
