= Stephen DeCanio =

American economist

Stephen DeCanio (born 1942) is a Professor of economics, emeritus, at the University of California, Santa Barbara. His current research deals with the impact of artificial intelligence on society, the economy, and culture. His recent research has also addressed the consequences of computational limits for economics and social theory more generally. He has published books and articles in the fields of global environmental protection and energy economics, the theory of the firm, and economic history. He studied mathematics as an undergraduate at the University of California, Berkeley and received his Ph.D. in economics from the Massachusetts Institute of Technology in 1972. After teaching at Tufts University (1970–72) and Yale University (1972–78), he joined the faculty at UCSB in 1978. From 1986 to '87 he was the Senior Staff Economist at the President's Council of Economic Advisors. He was also a member of the United Nations Environment Programme Economic Options Panel, which reviewed the economic aspects of the Montreal Protocol on Substances that Deplete the Ozone Layer.

== Awards ==
In 1996 he was awarded the Stratospheric Ozone Protection Award by the United States Environmental Protection Agency and in 2007 he was presented with the Leontief Prize for Advancing the Frontiers of Economic Thought by the Global Development and Environment Institute. He participated in the Intergovernmental Panel on Climate Change that shared the 2007 Nobel Peace Prize.

== Publications ==
In addition to numerous journal articles, DeCanio has written the following books:

- Agriculture in the Postbellum South: The Economics of Production and Supply. Cambridge, Massachusetts: M.I.T. Press, 1974.
- Taxing Energy: Oil Severance Taxation and the Economy (with Robert T. Deacon, H.E. Frech, III, and M. Bruce Johnson). New York: Holmes & Meier Publishers, Inc., 1990.
- Tax Waste, Not Work (with Jeff Hamond, principal author, and Peggy Duxbury, Alan Sanstad, and Christopher Stinson). San Francisco: Redefining Progress, 1997.
- The Economics of Climate Change: A Background Paper. San Francisco: Redefining Progress, 1997. (A copy of this may be found in the References section of the Economics of global warming entry.)
- Economic Models of Climate Change: A Critique. Houndmills, UK: Palgrave-Macmillan, 2003.
- Limits of Economic and Social Knowledge. Houndmills, UK: Palgrave-Macmillan, 2014.
