= Global Development and Environment Institute =

Research center at Tufts University

Coordinates: 42.405628°N 71.125017°W

Global Development And Environment Institute
- Abbreviation: GDAE
- Formation: 1993
- Type: Research center
- Headquarters: Tufts University, United States
- Co-directors: Neva Goodwin; William Moomaw
- Website: ase.tufts.edu/gdae/

The Global Development And Environment Institute (GDAE, pronounced “gee-day”) is a research center at Tufts University founded in 1993. GDAE conducts research and develops teaching materials in economics and related areas that follow an interdisciplinary approach that emphasizes ecological, cultural, social, and institutional factors. The institute has produced more than twenty books and numerous articles, policy documents, and discussion papers. These materials are used in academic settings, to enhance the teaching of economics and related subjects, and in policy circles, where GDAE researchers are recognized leaders in their fields.

Texts and educational modules developed at GDAE are now distributed and managed through Boston University’s Economics in Context Initiative.

GDAE’s current research and educational efforts are centered in three areas: "Land, Energy, and Climate"; Green Economics; and educational materials in Environmental and Natural Resource Economics. GDAE researchers present their research in a series of policy briefs, working papers, and at numerous conferences. GDAE’s earlier research and publications include areas such as globalization, trade, and feminist economics.

== Personnel ==
Neva Goodwin and William Moomaw are Co-Directors of GDAE. Other members of the research team are Jonathan M. Harris, Brian Roach and Anne-Marie Codur. Monica Barros is responsible for administration and communications. Gillian Davies, Andrew Tirrell, and David Sussman are Visiting Scholars at GDAE, and Jeronim Capaldo is a research fellow. Bethany Tietjen and Josephine Watson are GDAE Research Assistants.

== Research ==
GDAE’s research program emphasizes ecological health and the correlation between social and economic well-being. They view economic systems in physical contexts of technology and the natural world, as well as in the social/psychological contexts of history, politics, ethics, culture, institutions, and human motivations.

== Publications ==
GDAE has extensive publication record, including the production of the ‘In-Context’ series of textbooks and free teaching modules which are now managed by the Economics in Context Initiative at Boston University.

=== Textbooks ===
The textbooks in question include Microeconomics in Context, Macroeconomics in Context, Macroeconomics in Context (European Edition), Principles of Economics in Context, Environmental and Resource Economics, and the soon-to-be-published Essentials of Economics in Context.

These textbooks present all the content required of a standard text, and also offer a more holistic approach to understanding economic processes by integrating aspects of history, institutions, gender, inequality, and the environment.

The texts come with a full set of supplementary materials including instructor resource material with lecture outlines, a test bank of over 2,000 questions, and PowerPoint slides. Detailed student study guides are available for free download.

=== Modules ===
GDAE has also produced an extensive set of teaching modules that are designed for use as stand-alone supplements in undergraduate or graduate-level courses. These modules are available as free downloadable PDFs. They range from 25 to 60 pages, and most include discussion questions and glossary.

=== Frontier Issues in Economic Thought ===
GDAE produced the six-volume series Frontier Issues in Economic Thought, published by Island Press. The articles that GDAE researchers selected and summarized for this project focus on the limitations of the mainstream economic paradigm and a wide range of creative efforts that have been and are being made to extend economic understanding.

=== Social Science Library: Frontier Thinking in Sustainable Development and Human Well-being ===
GDAE has produced an electronic collection of publications that are available for free to universities in 138 nations, with special attention to those institutions that are most in need of library resources. The collection, or the Social Science Library (SSL), contains over 3,400 full-text journal articles, book chapters, reports, and working papers in anthropology, economics, history, philosophy, social psychology, sociology and political science. It also includes full bibliographic references (including abstracts) to more than 6,000 additional articles. The SSL is available upon request to those that qualify for access. For people who are not in the recipient countries, a web-based version, with the 10,000+ bibliographic entries, but without the full text PDFs is available on request.

== Leontief Prize ==
In 2000, GDAE established the Leontief Prize. Named in honor of Wassily Leontief, member of the GDAE advisory board and recipient of the Nobel Memorial Prize in Economic Sciences, the annual award recognizes outstanding contributions to economic theory that address contemporary realities and support just and sustainable societies.

- 2000 – Amartya Sen and John Kenneth Galbraith
- 2001 – Herman E. Daly and Paul P. Streeten
- 2002 – Alice Amsden and Dani Rodrik
- 2003 - No Award Given
- 2004 – Robert H. Frank and Nancy Folbre
- 2005 – Ha-Joon Chang and Richard R. Nelson
- 2006 – Juliet Schor and Samuel Bowles
- 2007 - Jomo Kwame Sundaram and Stephen DeCanio
- 2008 - José Antonio Ocampo and Robert Wade
- 2009 - No Award Given
- 2010 - Bina Agarwal and Daniel Kahneman
- 2011 - Nicholas Stern and Martin Weitzman
- 2012 - Michael Lipton and C. Peter Timmer
- 2013 - Albert O. Hirschman and Frances Stewart
- 2014 - Angus Deaton and James K. Galbraith
- 2015 - Duncan K. Foley and Lance Taylor
- 2016 - Amit Bhaduri and Diane Elson
- 2017 - James Boyce and Joan Martinez Alier
- 2018 - Mariana Mazzucato and Branko Milanovic
