= James K. Boyce =

James Kenneth Boyce is a British researcher who has investigated ecological, developmental and justice-oriented approaches to political economy with his more recent work focusing on ethical issues associated with the environment and climate change. He earned his PhD from the University of Oxford. He has been a senior fellow at the Political Economy Research Institute at the University of Massachusetts Amherst and also holds the title there of professor emeritus of Economics.

He has been the recipient of many awards including the Leontief Prize for Advancing the Frontiers of Economic Thought.

== Selected publications ==
- Torras, M., & Boyce, J. K. (1998). Income, inequality, and pollution: a reassessment of the environmental Kuznets curve. Ecological economics, 25(2), 147–160.
- Boyce, J. K. (1994). Inequality as a cause of environmental degradation. Ecological economics, 11(3), 169–178.
- Boyce, J. K. & Léonce Ndikumana (2022) On the Trail of Capital Flight from Africa: The Takers and the Enablers, Oxford University Press
- Boyce, J. K. (2019) Economics for People and the Planet: Inequality in the Era of Climate Change, Anthem
- Boyce, J. K. (2019) The Case for Carbon Dividends, Polity
- Boyce, J. K. (2002) Investing in Peace: Aid and Conditionality After Civil Wars, Oxford University Press
- Boyce, J. K. (2002) The Political Economy of the Environment, Edward Elgar
- Boyce, J. K. (1993) The Philippines: The Political Economy of Growth and Impoverishment in the Marcos Era, Macmillan
- Boyce, J. K. (1987) Agrarian Impasse in Bengal: Institutional Constraints to Technological Change, Oxford University Press
