= Sanjaya Lall =

Indian economist (1940–2005)

- Born: 13 December 1940; Patna, Bihar, India
- Died: 18 June 2005 (aged 64)

Academic background
- Education: Patna University; St John's College, Oxford; University of Oxford

Academic work
- Discipline: Development studies
- Institutions: Oxford University
- Website: Information at IDEAS / RePEc

Sanjaya Lall (13 December 1940 – 18 June 2005) was a development economist and Professor of Economics at the University of Oxford. Lall's research interests included the impact of foreign direct investment in developing countries, the economics of multi-national corporations, and the development of technological capability and industrial competitiveness in developing countries. One of the world's pre-eminent development economists, Lall was also one of the founding editors of the journal Oxford Development Studies and a senior economist at the World Bank (1965–68 and 1985–87).

== Biography ==
Lall was born in Patna, Bihar, India, and graduated from Patna University in 1960 with a BA in economics, receiving the Gold Medal for ranking first in the university. He then read for a degree in Philosophy, Politics, and Economics at St. John's College, Oxford University, graduating with first class honours in 1963. Lall subsequently achieved a distinction in the MPhil in economics at Oxford in 1965. Lall was the grandson of the prominent Indian historian K.P. Jayaswal, and the brother-in-law of Cambridge economist Ajit Singh.

Lall's career began working as an economist at the World Bank (1965–68). Apart from a two-year return to the bank in the mid-1980s, Oxford remained his home, where he served first as Junior, then as Senior, Research Officer at the Institute of Economics and Statistics for over 30 years; as a University Lecturer in Development Economics at Queen Elizabeth House; as a Fellow of Green College since 1982; and as Professor of Development Economics since 1999. In addition, he was course director of Development Studies at Oxford and one of the founding editors of the journal Oxford Development Studies. He was one of the most productive economists at the university, writing or co-authoring 33 books between 1975 and 2003, publishing 75 listed articles in reputable refereed professional journals, 72 chapters in books, 67 reports for international agencies or governments, and another 27 articles. He also acted as adviser or consultant to a wide spectrum of governments and international development organisations, from the World Bank, UNICEF and the OECD to the European Commission and the Commonwealth Secretariat; he served as the Principal Consultant to UNCTAD (the United Nations Conference on Trade and Development) on its World Investment Report, and to UNIDO (the United Nations Industrial Development Organization) on its Industrial Development Report.

== Academic contributions ==
Lall made contributions to development economics in three major areas. The first of these came early in the form of pioneering work on transfer pricing by multinational enterprises, based especially on an empirical investigation of corporations operating in the pharmaceutical industry. It showed basically how multinationals could use intra-firm pricing and accounting mechanisms to siphon out, or invisibly repatriate, profits from their overseas enterprises. This was accompanied by extensive work on the role of foreign investment and multinationals in developing economies, done in part in collaboration with one of his early mentors, Paul Streeten. Lall's fascination with India and the Indian economy led to his opening up a related, highly significant field of work - the phenomenon of Third World multinationals, and developing countries as the exporters of technology.

A second interwoven strand of work was on the development of technological capability in developing countries. Technology has generally mystified economists, and in turn, and true to their profession, economic theorists have tended to mystify technology. Lall stands in a fine line of thinkers who have challenged the black-box, reductionist view of technology in economic theorising. In its place, he attempted to develop over time the notion of the construction of technological capability, whether in an enterprise, in a firm, in an industry, or in an economy. He argued that, far from just "picking" industrial winners, the East Asian tiger economies had carefully and proactively "created" winners through the generation of technological capability and the acquisition of industrial competitiveness.

This feeds directly into a third group of ideas. How should the industrialist, or the policymaker, in a developing country set about generating technological capability and industrial competitiveness? Lall's empirical work carefully scrutinised the validity of the ubiquitous assertions that unrestricted flows of foreign direct investment (FDI) through multinationals would lead to effective technology transfer into the manufacturing sectors of developing economies. Lall tends seriously to question the automaticity of any such benefit transfer; he shows, however, the relevance of an active state policy vis-à-vis the domestic manufacturing and technology sectors.

The importance of the role of the state in generating a successful path of competitive industrialisation was one of the continuous threads running through his work. He did not balk at taking on positions that were unpopular among the neo-liberal unfettered-globalisation school. Very early in his career, he wrote a paper which toyed critically with the notion of dependency. Ever since then, the issue of the viability of autonomous, not autarkic, industrialisation in Third World economies was for him a latent leitmotif. From start to finish, Lall remained a passionate, but scientifically rigorous, advocate of Third World industrial development.

== The Sanjaya Lall Visiting Professorship in Development and Business ==
The Sanjaya Lall Visiting Professorship at the University of Oxford, created to honour Lall's academic legacy, has established itself as one of the most prestigious visiting appointments in economics. It has been held by the following scholars:

2011: Robert Wade
2013: Dani Rodrik
2014: Paul Krugman
2015: Abhijit Banerjee
2016: Avinash Dixit
2017: Kenneth Rogoff
2018: Esther Duflo
2022: Joseph Stiglitz
2023: Raj Chetty
2024: Daron Acemoglu
2025: Rohini Pande

The Visiting Professorship, which is associated with the Social Sciences Division and Green Templeton College, was launched on 3 June 2011. The inaugural event was a panel discussion involving Nobel Laureate Amartya Sen, Financial Times commentator Martin Wolf, and the first holder of the new Chair, Robert Wade of the London School of Economics. The event was opened by the Chancellor of Oxford University, Lord Chris Patten. Other speakers included Colin Mayer, Dean of the Said Business School, and Frances Stewart of Queen Elizabeth House. The panellists began by evoking the memory of Sanjaya both as a friend and a pioneering development economist. Drawing on Sanjaya's intellectual legacy, they debated how emerging economies will shape the future of the global economy and the challenges they are likely to face. Professor Sen highlighted the considerable pressures Western democracies face from powerful banking institutions, and the lessons to be learned from emerging markets with more robust regulatory systems. Mr Wolf illustrated the rapid convergence of a small number of developing countries, led by China, with advanced economies. Professor Wade discussed the problems of global economic governance, arguing for radical reform of bodies such as the IMF and the G-20. The event attracted over 800 people, the largest ever turnout in the history of the Said Business School. A large number of distinguished academics from Oxford and beyond, as well as representatives from UNIDO, the World Bank, the IMF and other international organisations, attended the event.

== Published works ==
- Lall, Sanjaya; Streeten, Paul (1977). Foreign investment, transnationals, and developing countries. Boulder, Colorado: Westview Press. ISBN 9780891588009.

Reprinted as Lall, Sanjaya; Streeten, Paul (1977). Foreign investment, transnationals, and developing countries. London New York: Macmillan. ISBN 9780333168981.

- Lall, Sanjaya; United Nations, Industrial Development Organisation (1978). The growth of the pharmaceutical industry in developing countries: problems and prospects. New York: United Nations. OCLC 4358811.
- Lall, Sanjaya (1980). The multinational corporation: nine essays. London / New York: Macmillan / Holmes and Meier. ISBN 9780841950832.
- Lall, Sanjaya (1981). Developing countries in the international economy: selected papers. London Atlantic Highlands, New Jersey: Macmillan Distributed in the U.S.A. by Humanities Press. ISBN 9780333288757.
- Lall, Sanjaya (1982). Developing countries as exporters of technology: a first look at the Indian experience. London: Macmillan. ISBN 9780333288443.
- Lall, Sanjaya (1983). The new multinationals: the spread of Third World enterprises. Chichester West Sussex New York: Wiley. ISBN 9780471902416.

Reprinted in French as Les Multionationales Originaires du Tiers Monde, Paris: Press Universitaires de France, 1984; and in German as Multionationale Konzerne aus der Dritten Welt, Frankfurt: Campus Verlag, 1984.

- Lall, Sanjaya (1985). Multinationals, technology and exports: selected papers. London: Macmillan. ISBN 9780333387702.
- Lall, Sanjaya (1987). Learning to industrialize: the acquisition of technological capability by India. Houndmills, Basingstoke, Hampshire / New York: Macmillan Press / St. Martin's Press. ISBN 9780333433768.
- Lall, Sanjaya (1990). Building industrial competitiveness in developing countries. Paris, France Washington, D.C.: Development Centre of the Organisation for Economic Co-operation and Development - OECD Publications and Information Centre, distributor. ISBN 9789264133976.

Reprinted in French as Promouvir la Competitivite Industriells dans les Pays en Developpement, Paris: OECD, 1990.

- Lall, Sanjaya; Balasubramanyam, Vudayagiri N. (1991). Current issues in development economics. Houndmills, Basingstoke, Hampshire: Macmillan Education. ISBN 9780333513248.
- Lall, Sanjaya (author); Stewart, Frances (editor) (1986). Theory and reality in development: essays in honour of Paul Streeten. New York: St. Martin's Press. ISBN 9780312797263.
- Lall, Sanjaya; Stewart, Frances; Wangwe, Samuel (1992). Alternative development strategies in subSaharan Africa. New York: St. Martin's Press. ISBN 9780312067380.
- Lall, Sanjaya (1993), "Volume 3: Transnational corporations and economic development", in Dunning, John H. (ed.), United Nations Library on Transnational Corporations, London New York: Routledge, ISBN 9780415085540
- Lall, Sanjaya (author); Narula, Rajneesh (author); Kanavos, Panos (author); Fujita, Masataka (author); Taylor, Robert (editor) (March 1993). Transnational corporations from developing countries: impact on their home countries. New York: United Nations Centre on Transnational Corporations. ISBN 9789211044102.

Available online: Part 1 (pdf), part 2 (pdf), part 3 (pdf), part 4 (pdf) and part 5 (pdf).

- Lall, Sanjaya; Najmabadi, Farrokh; Banerji, Shyamadas (1992). World Bank support for industrialization in Korea, India, and Indonesia. Washington, D.C.: Operations Evaluation Dept., World Bank. ISBN 9780821321096.
- Lall, Sanjaya; Barba Navaretti, Giorgio; Teitel, Simon; Wignaraja, Ganeshan (1994). Technology and enterprise development: Ghana under structural adjustment. Basingstoke England: Macmillan. ISBN 9780333648490.
- Lall, Sanjaya; Najmabadi, Farrokh (1995). Developing industrial technology: lessons for policy and practice. Washington, D.C.: World Bank, Operations Evaluation Department Study. ISBN 9780821333983.
- Lall, Sanjaya (1996). Learning from the Asian tigers: studies in technology and industrial policy. Houndmills, Basingstoke, Hampshire New York: Macmillan Press St. Martin's Press. ISBN 9780333674109.
- Lall, Sanjaya (1997). Attracting foreign investment: new trends, sources and policies (economic paper 31). London: Commonwealth Secretariat, Economic Affairs Division. ISBN 9780850925067.
- Lall, Sanjaya (1997). Selective policies for export promotion: lessons from the Asian tigers. Helsinki: UN University, World Institute for Development Economics Research. ISBN 9789529520688.
- Lall, Sanjaya (1999). The technological response to import liberalization in Sub-Saharan Africa. New York Maastricht, Netherlands: St. Martin's Press United Nations University, INTECH. ISBN 9780312218003.
- Lall, Sanjaya (1999). Competing with labour: skills and competitiveness in developing countries (economic paper 31). Geneva: International Labour Office. ISBN 9789221118008.
- Lall, Sanjaya (1999). Promoting industrial competitiveness in developing countries: lessons from Asia (economic paper 39). London: Commonwealth Secretariat. ISBN 9780850926231.
- Lall, Sanjaya (2000). Export performance, technological upgrading and foreign direct investment strategies in the Asian newly industrializing economies: with special reference to Singapur. Santiago, Chile: UN ECLAC, Division of Production, Productivity and Management, Unit of Investment and Corporate Strategies. ISBN 9789211212761.

Also available in Spanish: UN ECLAC, Santiago de Chile, serie desarrollo productivo number 88.

- Lall, Sanjaya; et al. (2000). The competitiveness challenge: transnational corporations and industrial restructuring in developing countries. New York: United Nations: Conference on Trade and Development. ISBN 9789211125030.
- Lall, Sanjaya (2001). Competitiveness, technology and skills. Cheltenham, UK Northampton, Massachusetts, USA: Edward Elgar. ISBN 9781840645866.
- Lall, Sanjaya (2001). The economics of technology transfer. The International Library of Critical Writings in Economics. Cheltenham England Northampton, Massachusetts, USA: Edward Elgar Publishing. ISBN 9781840645668.
- Lall, Sanjaya; Magariños, Carlos A.; Ricupero, Rubens; Assaf, George; Martinussen, John D.; Sercovich, Francisco (2001). Reforming the UN system: UNIDO's need-driven model. Hague New York: Kluwer Law International. ISBN 9789041116697.
- Lall, Sanjaya; Pietrobelli, Carlo (2002). Failing to compete: technology development and technology systems in Africa. Cheltenham, UK. Northampton, Massachusetts: Edward Elgar Publishing. ISBN 9781840646405.
- Lall, Sanjaya (2003). Competitiveness, FDI and technological activity in East Asia. Cheltenham, UK Northampton, Massachusetts, USA: Edward Elgar Publishing for the World Bank Institute. ISBN 9781843761143.
