= Project Socrates =

US Defense Intelligence Agency program

Classified intelligence program overview
- Formed: 1983
- Dissolved: April 1990
- Jurisdiction: United States
- Headquarters: Washington, D.C.
- Classified intelligence program executive: Michael C. Sekora, Founding Director
- Parent Classified intelligence program: Defense Intelligence Agency

Project Socrates was a classified U.S. Defense Intelligence Agency program established in 1983 within the Reagan administration. It was founded and directed by physicist Michael C. Sekora to determine why the United States was unable to maintain economic competitiveness—and to rectify the situation. The program was described as a joint White House and U.S. intelligence community initiative.

According to Project Socrates:

[B]ird's eye view of competition went far beyond, in terms of scope and completeness, the extremely narrow slices of data that were available to the professors, professional economists, and consultants that addressed the issue of competitiveness. The conclusions that the Socrates team derived about competitiveness in general and about the U.S. in particular were in almost all cases in direct opposition to what the professors, economists and consultants had been saying for years, and to what had been accepted as irrefutable underlying truths by decision-makers throughout the U.S.

The program's findings were credited with contributing to U.S. advances in missile defense technology during the Strategic Defense Initiative (SDI), commonly known as "Star Wars".

When Reagan's presidential term ended and the Bush administration came to the White House, Project Socrates was labeled as "industrial policy", and began to fall from favor. As a result, in April 1990, the program was defunded.

== Early history ==
Sekora was a physicist who had been recruited by the CIA in 1979, where he worked as an intelligence officer within the CIA's Office of Technical Services. In 1983, he transferred to the U.S. Defense Intelligence Agency (DIA), where he began working on preventing the flow of Western military technologies to the Soviet Union. At the time, the intelligence agencies of the Soviet Union like the KGB and GRU were aggressively seeking to acquire technology from the United States and other Western countries such as France and Germany, using a variety of covert and overt, legal and illegal means.

It became clear to Sekora that the United States' technology policy was fundamentally different from those of all other countries he had studied. The U.S. technology policy consisted primarily of export controls to prevent the flow of U.S.-developed technology to military adversaries. In contrast, the technology policies of other countries—both adversaries and allies—addressed the flow of technology both into and out of their borders, for both military and commercial purposes.

The U.S. approach was premised on the notion that all technology of value to the country was domestically generated through internal research and development (R&D), and therefore the only necessary national technology policy was to prevent its flow out of the country. Meanwhile, other countries were managing the flows of commercial and military technologies into and out of their respective borders to build economic and military strength.

Sekora concluded that the United States needed to abandon its narrow approach to technology and instead manage technology flows in a manner superior to those of its competitors. He thereafter initiated the Socrates Project within the Defense Intelligence Agency.

== Mission ==
The Socrates Project had a twofold mission: first, to determine the true underlying cause of the United States' declining competitiveness, and second, to use this understanding to develop the means to rebuild it.

In the early 1980s, it was becoming apparent to some observers that the United States was losing its competitive edge, particularly in key industries including the auto industry. However, the Socrates team considered the prevailing explanations for the decline—such as "Japan, Inc." or "a non-level playing field"—to be too superficial for the mission of actually rebuilding competitiveness, and inconsistent with what was being observed in the course of counter-technology-transfer work against the Soviets.

To determine the source of the problem, Project Socrates assembled an all-source intelligence system which enabled the project to examine competition on a global scale. The combination of deep intelligence and digital data provided a bird's-eye, holistic view of all forms of competition worldwide.

== Discoveries and findings ==
A key finding of the Socrates team was that after World War II, decision-makers throughout the United States had shifted away from technology-based planning and adopted finance-based planning, where the primary objective was optimizing financial measures like budgets and profit margins rather than maximizing technological capability. The Socrates analysts concluded that this shift to finance-based planning was the principal cause of America's competitive decline.

Project Socrates identified five key mental shifts which had to take place in order to restore the United States' competitive edge:

1. Decision-makers must revert to technology exploitation (i.e., the acquisition and utilization of technology to include R&D) as the foundation for their decision-making—technology-based planning.
2. The exploitation of technology is the most effective foundation for decision-making for the complete set of functions within the private and public sectors that determine U.S. competitiveness.
3. To exploit technology more effectively than its competitors, the United States must generate and lead the next evolutionary step in technology exploitation—the automated innovation revolution.
4. A system was developed within the Socrates Project of the U.S. intelligence community, and then refined in the private sector, that would enable the United States to generate and lead the automated innovation revolution, providing U.S. organizations with the ability to generate and maintain a major competitive advantage over all competitors worldwide.
5. The automated innovation system would enable U.S. organizations to exploit the full range of national resources in a highly coherent, flexible, and independent fashion.

== Application to the Strategic Defense Initiative ==
The Socrates automated innovation system was applied to several high-priority White House initiatives, including the Strategic Defense Initiative (SDI, known as "Star Wars") and stealth programs. According to Sekora, the technology-based planning principles developed under Socrates enabled the United States to surpass the Soviet Union in missile defense capability, putting economic pressure on the Soviet Union to attempt to match the advances.

== Cancellation and legacy ==
Before Reagan's term ended, he had an executive order drafted to establish a new federal government agency—the first since the creation of NASA in the 1950s—with the mandate of deploying the Socrates system as a national asset for use by all U.S. private and public organizations. However, the executive order was not signed before Reagan left office.

When the Bush administration took office in 1989, it labeled the program as "industrial policy" and the program was defunded in April 1990.

After leaving government, Sekora took the concepts developed at Socrates into the private sector. He became the head of Technology Strategic Planning Inc. (TSP) and later Quadrigy, consulting firms that applied the technology-based planning principles to private industry. The project has continued to receive attention from analysts and commentators who argue that its technology-based planning approach remains relevant to modern competition with China.
