= Mature market =

A market is mature when it has reached a state of equilibrium. A market is considered to be in a state of equilibrium when there is an absence of significant growth or a lack of innovation. When supply matches demand the price determined by market forces is called the equilibrium price. Equilibrium prices prevail in the market for a substantial period, which may be from one day to one week or several months.

== See also ==
- Mature technology
