= Atul Kohli =

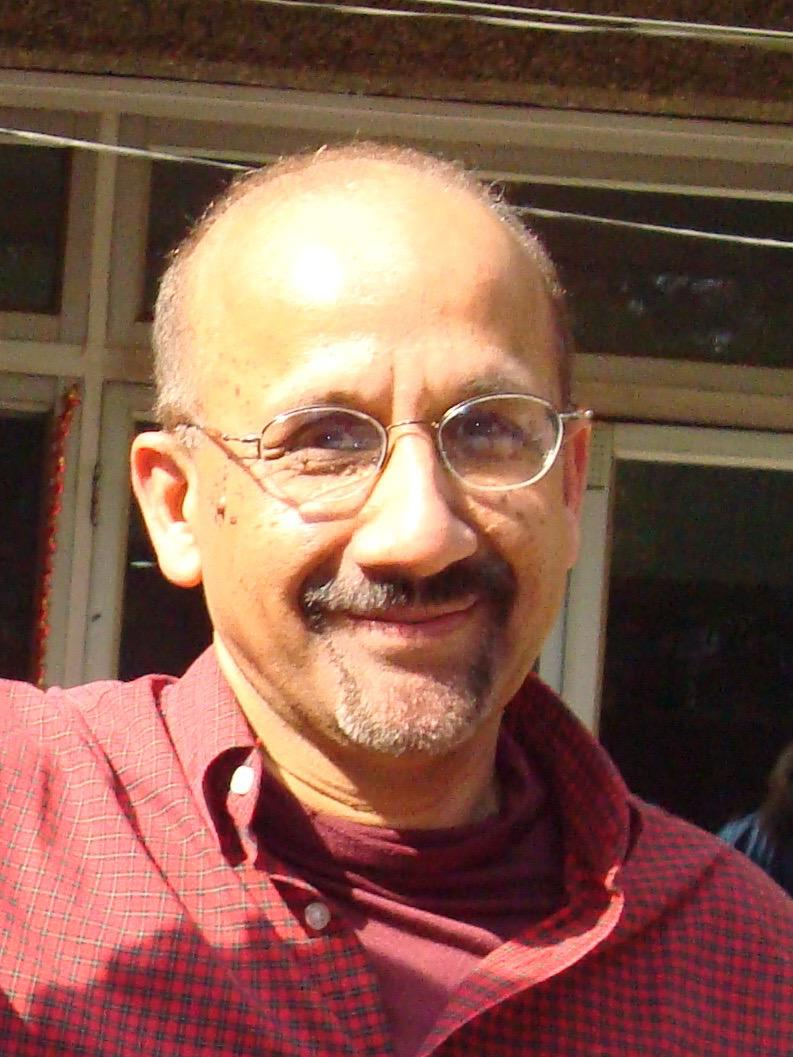
- Born: India
- Known for: Political economy of development, State-building, South Asia studies
- Awards: Charles H. Levine Award (2005); Foreign Affairs Best Book Award (2012); Stanley Kelley Jr. Teaching Award (2020)

Academic background
- Education: Carleton University (M.A.); University of California, Berkeley (Ph.D.)
- Thesis: (1981)

Academic work
- Sub-discipline: Political science, Political economy, Development studies
- Institutions: Princeton University
- Notable works: State-Directed Development; Poverty Amid Plenty in the New India

Atul Kohli is an Indian-Canadian-American political scientist whose work focuses on the political economy of development, state-building, and democracy, particularly in the context of South Asia. He is the David K.E. Bruce Professor of International Affairs and Professor of Politics and International Affairs at Princeton University.

== Early life and education ==
Kohli was born in India and migrated to Canada at the age of 15, where he completed his secondary education. At Carleton University in Canada, he first studied engineering and then switched to the social sciences, receiving an M.A. in International Studies (economic development). He went on to pursue doctoral studies in the United States, completing a Ph.D. in political science at the University of California, Berkeley in 1981. His principal research interests are in the areas of comparative political economy with a focus on developing countries. He has authored and edited several books on the role of the state in development, on the role of imperialism in the developing world, and on the Indian state and political economy.

== Academic career ==
Kohli began his academic career as an Assistant Professor in the Department of Political Science at Michigan State University from 1981 to 1983. He then joined Princeton University in 1983, where he served as Assistant and Associate Professor in Woodrow Wilson School and Department of Politics until 1991. In 1991, he was promoted to full Professor, and in 2002, he was appointed as the David K.E. Bruce Professor of International Affairs at Princeton University.

Kohli served as the Chief Editor of the journal World Politics from 2006 to 2013 and was Vice President of the American Political Science Association from 2009 to 2010.

Kohli's research primarily focuses on the political economy of developing countries, with a particular emphasis on state power and development strategies. His scholarly contributions include several influential books, such as State-Directed Development: Political Power and Industrialization in the Global Periphery (2004), which received the Charles H. Levine Award from the International Political Science Association in 2005. Another notable work, Poverty amid Plenty in the New India (2012), was recognized by Foreign Affairs as one of the best books on Asia and the Pacific in 2012. His research is cited widely. According to Google Scholar, his H-Index is 42 and he was rated a “top scholar” by ScholarGPS.

In recognition of his teaching excellence, Kohli received the Stanley Kelley Jr. Teaching Award from Princeton University in 2020.

== Professional service and recognition ==
Kohli has served as the Chief-Editor of the journal World Politics and has served on editorial boards of journals such as American Political Science Review, Comparative Political Studies, and Studies in Comparative International Development. He has been active in academic and policy circles, including work with the American Political Science Association, World Bank, United Nations Development Program, and the Social Science Research Council.

== Honors and Fellowships ==
He has received fellowships from the Social Science Research Council, the MacArthur Foundation, the Ford Foundation, and the Russell Sage Foundation. He gave lectures and keynote addresses globally, including at institutions in India, Brazil, China, Germany, and the United Kingdom.

== Books ==
=== Author ===
- "Conclusion: The State and Reform in Democratic–Capitalist Development", The State and Poverty in India, Cambridge University Press, January 22, 1987, pp. 223–236, doi:10.1017/cbo9780511558870.007, ISBN 978-0-521-37876-5
- Kohli, Atul (April 26, 1991). Democracy and Discontent. Cambridge University Press. doi:10.1017/cbo9781139173803. ISBN 978-0-521-39692-9.
- Kohli, Atul (2004). State-Directed Development: Political Power and Industrialization in the Global Periphery. Cambridge University Press. ISBN 9780521545259.
- Kohli, Atul (2009). Democracy and Development in India: From Socialism to Pro-Business. OUP India. ISBN 9780198068471.
- Kohli, Atul (2012). Poverty Amid Plenty in the New India. New york: Cambridge University Press. ISBN 9780521735179.
- Kohli, Atul (2014). India's Democracy: An Analysis of Changing State-Society Relations. Princeton University Press. ISBN 9780691601106.
- Kohli, Atul (February 20, 2020). Imperialism and the Developing World. Oxford University PressNew York. doi:10.1093/oso/9780190069629.001.0001. ISBN 978-0-19-006962-9.
- Kohli, Atul (October 24, 2022). Greed and Guns. Cambridge University Press. doi:10.1017/9781009199759. ISBN 978-1-009-19975-9.

=== Editor / Co-editor / Co-author ===
- Kohli, Atul; Basu, Amrita (1998). Community Conflicts and the State in India. OUP India. ISBN 9780195642360.
- Kohli, Atul (2008). The Success of India's Democracy. Cambridge University Press. ISBN 9780521805308.
- Kohli, Atul (2014). The State and Development in the Third World: A "World Politics" Reader. Princeton University Press. ISBN 9780691610351.
- Kohli, Atul; Singh, Prerna (2016). Routledge Handbook of Indian Politics. Routledge. ISBN 9781138679191.
- Kohli, Atul; Jaffrelot, Christophe; Murali, Kanta (2019). Business and Politics in India. OUP USA. ISBN 9780190912468.

== Selected awards ==
- Best Book Award, Foreign Affairs (2012)
- Best Book Award, International Political Science Association (2005) for State-Directed Development
- Excellence in Teaching, Princeton University
