= Paul Streeten =

Austrian-born British economics professor (1917–2019)

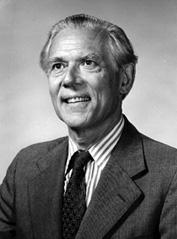
- Born: Paul Hornig; 18 July 1917; Austria-Hungary
- Died: 6 January 2019 (aged 101)

Academic background
- Education: Balliol College, Oxford

Academic work
- Discipline: Development economics
- Institutions: Boston University, US

Paul Patrick Streeten (18 July 1917 – 6 January 2019) was an Austrian-born British economics professor. He was a professor at Boston University, US until his retirement. He has been a distinguished academic working on development economics since the 1950s.

== Biography ==
Born in Austria by the name of Paul Hornig, Streeten spent his formative years in Vienna. He became involved in political activism at an early age, and from 1933 on he was under continual threat of arrest and imprisonment. The 1938 Anschluss forced his family to flee Austria, scattering around the globe. Paul was taken in by a kindly English family, but in 1940 he was interned as an enemy alien. He was placed in several different camps, and in each one he occupied himself by setting up lecture or literary study groups. In 1942 he was able to join the UK military in a commando group destined to fight for the liberation of Sicily. While awaiting the commando action he again set up a drama group. When the action did take place (1943), Streeten was landed behind enemy lines. After a few weeks of heavy fighting, he was severely wounded.

== Education and early career ==
Streeten became a naturalized UK citizen. He entered Balliol College, Oxford in 1944. After receiving a degree he obtained a teaching post there (1948) and remained until 1964.

== Career ==
Streeten's institutional affiliations include the Institute of Development Studies (IDS) unit at the University of Sussex (Streeten was one founder of that unit). He was associated with the UNDP group that creates the annual Human Development Report.

He served as founding editor of the journal World Development from 1972. In the 1960s, he worked at the new Ministry of Overseas Development in the United Kingdom and acted as the director of the Institute of Development Studies (IDS). He became Warden of Queen Elizabeth House at the University of Oxford. Starting in 1990 he has been involved with both into the UNDP's Human Development Report and UNESCO's World Culture Reports.

In the 1980s Streeten became a professor at Boston University, and while there also served as director of the World Institute for Development Economics Research.

In the 1960s he was deputy director general of the Economic Planning Staff of the Ministry of Overseas Development and acting director of the Institute of Development Studies at Sussex before becoming Warden of Queen Elizabeth House, Oxford. In 1976-1980 and 1984–1985, he was a senior adviser with the World Bank, helping to formulate policies on basic needs. From the 1990 onwards, he provided intellectual inputs into the UNDP's Human Development Report and UNESCO's World Culture Reports.

He turned 100 in July 2017 and died on 6 January 2019 at the age of 101.

== Major published works ==
Works of Paul Streeten include:

=== Books ===
- Streeten, Paul (1961). Economic integration: aspects and problems. Leyden, Netherlands: A. W. Sythoff. ISBN 9780195203691. OCLC 245944056.
- Streeten, Paul (1972). The frontiers of development studies. New York: Wiley. ISBN 9780470833285.
- Streeten, Paul; Lall, Sanjaya (1977). Foreign investment, transnationals, and developing countries. London New York: Macmillan. ISBN 9780333168981.
- Streeten, Paul (1981). Development perspectives. New York: St. Martin's Press. ISBN 9780312196905.
- Streeten, Paul (1981). First things first: meeting basic human needs in the developing countries. New York: Published for the World Bank by Oxford University Press. ISBN 9780195203691.
- Streeten, Paul (1995). Thinking about development. Cambridge New York: Cambridge University Press. ISBN 9780521599733.
- Streeten, Paul (2001). Globalisation: threat or opportunity. Copenhagen: Copenhagen Business School Press. ISBN 9788763000840.

=== Chapters in books ===
- Streeten, Paul (1982), "The conflict between communication gaps and suitability gaps", in Jussawalla, Meheroo; Lamberton, D.M. (eds.), Communication economics and development, Honolulu Hawaii Elmsford, New York: East-West Center Pergamon Press, pp. 16–35, ISBN 9780080275208

Also available as: Streeten, Paul (1982). "The conflict between communication gaps and suitability gaps". Communication Economics and Development. Pergamon Policy Studies on International Development via Elsevier. pp. 16–35. doi:10.1016/B978-0-08-027520-8.50007-2. ISBN 9780080275208.

=== Journal articles ===
- Streeten, Paul (1950). "Reserve capacity and the kinked demand curve". Review of Economic Studies. 18 (2): 103–113. doi:10.2307/2295798. JSTOR 2295798.
- Streeten, Paul (1954). Elasticity optimism and pessimism in international trade. Vol. 7. p. 87. ISBN 9780195203691. OCLC 882468573. ;
- Streeten, Paul (1954). "Programs and prognoses". The Quarterly Journal of Economics. 68 (3): 355–376. doi:10.2307/1881968. JSTOR 1881968.
- Streeten, Paul (February 1955). "Productivity and the balance of trade". Bulletin of the Oxford University Institute of Economics & Statistics. 17 (1): 11–17. doi:10.1111/j.1468-0084.1955.mp17001003.x.
- Streeten, Paul; Black, J. (1957). "Growth, the terms of trade and the balance of trade". Économie Appliquée / Review of Economic Studies. 10 (2–3): 299–322.
- Streeten, Paul (1958). "A note on Kaldor's "Speculation and Economic Stability"". Review of Economic Studies. 26 (1): 66–68. doi:10.2307/2295859. JSTOR 2295859.
- Streeten, Paul (November 1971). "Book reviews: The international corporation: A symposium : Charles P. Kindleberger (editor), (Cambridge, Mass., The M.I.T. Press, 1970, vii+415 pp.)". Journal of International Economics. 1 (4): 461–466. doi:10.1016/0022-1996(71)90046-8.
- Streeten, Paul (October–December 1974). "The limits of development research". World Development. 2 (10–12): 11–34. doi:10.1016/0305-750X(74)90052-7.
- Streeten, Paul (June 1975). "Policies towards multinationals". World Development. 3 (6): 393–397. doi:10.1016/0305-750X(75)90024-8.
- Streeten, Paul; Stewart, Frances (November 1976). "New strategies for development: poverty, income distribution, and growth". Oxford Economic Papers. 28 (3): 381–405. doi:10.1093/oxfordjournals.oep.a041350.
- Streeten, Paul (January 1982). "Approaches to a new international economic order". World Development. 10 (1): 1–17. doi:10.1016/0305-750X(82)90075-4.
- Streeten, Paul (October 1983). "Development dichotomies". World Development. 11 (10): 875–889. doi:10.1016/0305-750X(83)90070-0.

=== Book regarding Paul Streeten ===
- Stewart, Frances (editor); Lall, Sanjaya (author) (1986). Theory and reality in development: essays in honour of Paul Streeten. New York: St. Martin's Press. ISBN 9780312797263.
- Leah Garrett, X Troop: The Secret Jewish Commandos of World War II (Harper Collins US, Chatto Penguin Books UK: 2021) brought Garrett the most publicity in the United States, England, Europe and Israel.

=== Other ===
- United Nations Intellectual History Project (UNIHP), List of interviewees: Paul Streeten.
