= Robert Wade (scholar) =

New Zealand development scholar (born 1944)

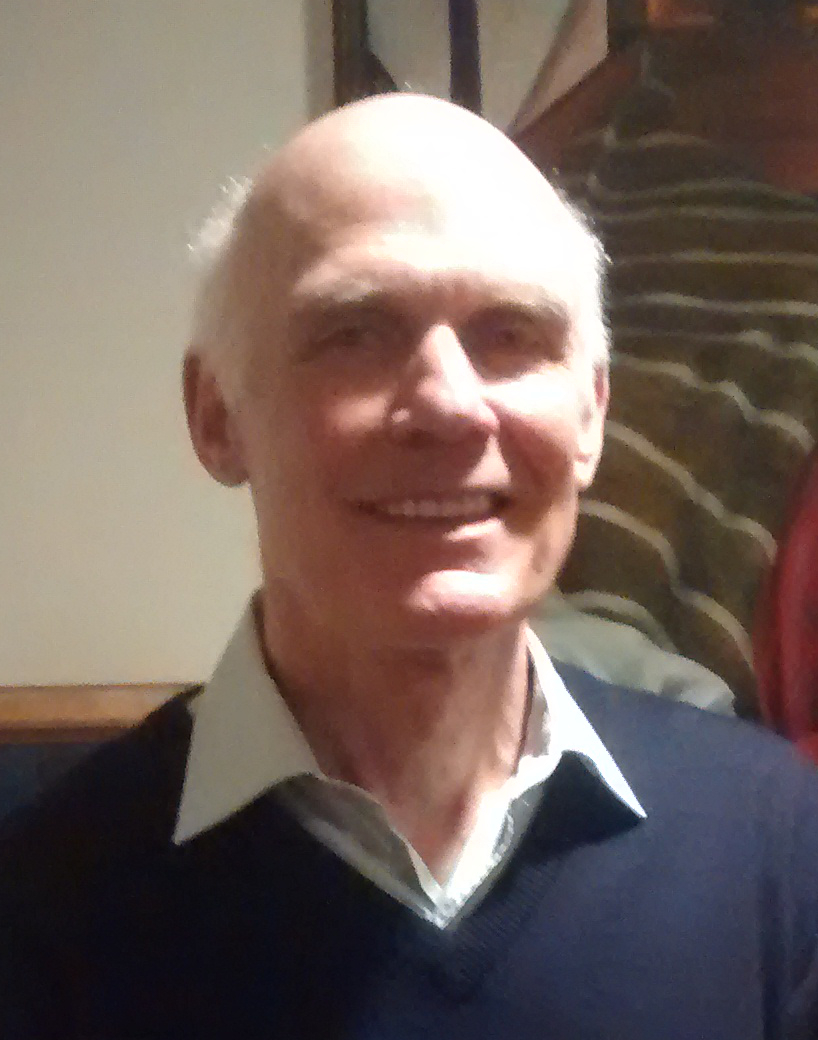
- Born: 1944 (age 81–82); Australia
- Education: University of Otago; Victoria University of Wellington (BA Hons, 1966); University of Sussex (MPhil, 1968; DPhil, 1971)
- Spouse: divorced
- Children: 2
- Awards: Leontief Prize (2008, jointly with José Antonio Ocampo), Best Book or Article in Political Economy, from American Political Science Association (1992), Honorary Doctor of Commerce, Victoria University of Wellington (2023)
- Scientific career
- Fields: Economic growth, core-periphery structure of world economy, UK and US empire, economic inequality, development studies, international political economy, industrial policy, public administration, irrigation
- Workplaces: London School of Economics, World Bank, Institute of Development Studies, Brown University, Princeton University, MIT
- Thesis: Colombaio: Collective Action and Social Change (1971)
- Website: www.lse.ac.uk/international-development/people/robert-wade

Robert Hunter Wade (born 1944) is a political economist and development scholar. He has been Professor of Global Political Economy at the Department of International Development, London School of Economics since 1999.

== Early life and education ==
He was born in Australia to New Zealand diplomat parents. He attended numerous schools worldwide, and spent months living in British Ceylon at the age of 13. He attended university in Dunedin (BA with a major in economics, University of Otago, 1962–64). After graduating he spent some months on Pitcairn Island in the South Pacific, studying the organization of economic life. Then he moved to Wellington (BA Hons, economics, Victoria University of Wellington, 1966, with first-class honours). Next, Sussex University, completing an MPhil in 1968 and a DPhil in social anthropology in 1971. His doctoral fieldwork, carried out in 1969–70, was in the Maremma region of Tuscany, Italy, an area affected by the post-war Italian land reform.

== Career ==
Wade worked at the Institute of Development Studies (IDS) at the University of Sussex from 1972 to 1995. On leave from IDS, he worked at the World Bank; the Office of Technology Assessment of the US Congress in 1988; Princeton University (Woodrow Wilson School) from 1989 to 1990; and the Massachusetts Institute of Technology (Sloan School and Political Science) from 1990 to 1991. He was professor of political economy at Brown University (Watson Institute and Political Science) from 1996 to 2000, before joining the LSE.

He held fellowships at the Institute for Advanced Study in Princeton, New Jersey (1992–1993), the Russell Sage Foundation in New York (1997–1998), and the Institute for Advanced Study, Berlin (2000–2001). In 2011 he was the Sanjaya Lall visiting professor at Oxford University.

== World Bank and fieldwork ==
Wade worked at the World Bank's headquarters on H Street in Washington, D.C. from 1984 to 1988. He has undertaken fieldwork in a range of countries and places including Pitcairn Island, Italy, India, Korea, Taiwan, Iceland. In a biography published by the United Nations Economic Commission for Europe, he describes his fieldwork as including work inside the World Bank and the International Monetary Fund, treating them as a classical anthropologist might treat a village. He worked again at the World Bank in the second half of the 1990s, researching a chapter on the Bank's engagement with environmental issues for the World Bank History project, and researching, for the Independent Inspection Panel, how the Bank's ill-fated Qinghai project in western China had been prepared inside the Bank.

== Research ==
Wade's research covers economic growth, the core–periphery structure of the world economy, economic inequality, development studies, international political economy, industrial policy, and public administration. His early fieldwork in India and South Korea concerned irrigation and collective action, resulting in the books Irrigation and Politics in South Korea (1982) and Village Republics: The Economic Conditions of Collective Action in India (1988), and the essay "The market for public office: why the Indian state is not better at development".

According to the Scopus-powered ScienceDirect author profile, Scopus indexed 139 of his documents, which together had 7,936 citations from 6,456 citing documents, giving an h-index of 42.

=== Governing the Market ===
Wade's Governing the Market: Economic Theory and the Role of Government in East Asia's Industrialization was published by Princeton University Press in 1990, with a paperback edition in 2003 that added a new introduction reviewing the debate on industrial policy in East and Southeast Asia and the 1990s Asian crisis. The book was reissued as an e-book and paperback in 2018. The book argues against both accounts that treated East Asian growth as a vindication of free-market principles and accounts that attributed it simply to government intervention, focusing instead on how allocation decisions were divided between markets and public administration. It received the American Political Science Association's award of Best Book or Article in Political Economy in 1992.

The book has been published in translation in several languages. A Chinese-language edition was published in 1994. A Spanish translation, El mercado dirigido, translated by Mónica Utrilla, was published by Fondo de Cultura Económica in Mexico in 1999. A Japanese translation, Higashi Ajia shihonshugi no seiji keizaigaku: Yushutsu rikkoku to shijō yūdō seisaku (東アジア資本主義の政治経済学：輸出立国と市場誘動政策), translated by Nagao Shin'ichi and others, was published by Dōbunkan Shuppan in Tokyo in 2000. Wade's curriculum vitae states that the book has also been translated into Korean and Vietnamese, and into Chinese in two editions, one for mainland China and one for Taiwan.

=== "Showdown at the World Bank" ===
In "Showdown at the World Bank", published in New Left Review in January–February 2001, Wade argued that the World Bank is more closely monitored and controlled by the US Treasury than its status as an international institution suggests. The article opens with the criticism of the International Monetary Fund and the US Treasury made by Joseph Stiglitz, the Bank's former chief economist, in 2000. In "Japan, the World Bank, and the art of paradigm maintenance: The East Asian Miracle in political perspective", New Left Review 217, 1996, he explains the clash between Japan's strategy of economic development as applied in Japan and later in its aid programs in Southeast Asia, and the World Bank's Washington Consensus strategy as applied to all developing countries; a clash that the Bank's final report attempted to resolve through compromise.

== Awards and recognition ==
In 2008, Wade received (jointly with José Antonio Ocampo) the Leontief Prize for Advancing the Frontiers of Economic Thought, awarded by the Global Development and Environment Institute at Tufts University, in recognition of his outstanding contribution to economic theory that addresses contemporary realities and supports just and sustainable societies. The award was announced in February 2008 and presented at a ceremony at Tufts on 17 November 2008, where both recipients lectured on "Beyond the Washington Consensus: New Visions for Trade and Development". The institute's co-director said their reevaluation of the Washington Consensus was a main reason for the selection.

In 1992 he received the American Political Science Association's award of Best Book or Article in Political Economy for Governing the Market.

In May 2023 Victoria University of Wellington conferred on Wade an honorary Doctor of Commerce at its graduation ceremonies.

== Selected publications ==
Books

- Wade, Robert H. (1982). Irrigation and Politics in South Korea. Boulder, Colo.: Westview Press. ISBN 978-0-86531-264-7.
- Wade, Robert H. (1988). Village Republics: The Economic Conditions of Collective Action in India. Cambridge: Cambridge University Press. ISBN 978-0-521-30146-6. (2nd ed. 1994)
- Wade, Robert H. (1990). Governing the Market: Economic Theory and the Role of Government in East Asia's Industrialization. Princeton, N.J.: Princeton University Press. ISBN 978-0-691-11729-4. (paperback ed. 2003, with new introduction). Winner of the American Political Science Association's award of Best Book or Article in Political Economy, 1992.

Book chapters

- Wade, Robert H. (2014). "The strange neglect of income inequality in economics and public policy". In Stewart, Frances; Cornia, Giovanni A. (eds.). Towards human development new approaches to macroeconomics and inequality. Oxford, Oxfordshire: Oxford University Press. pp. 99–121. ISBN 978-0-19-870608-3.

Journal articles

- Wade, Robert H. (1985). "The market for public office: why the Indian state is not better at development". World Development. 13 (4).
- Wade, Robert Hunter (2004-07-01). "Is Globalization Reducing Poverty and Inequality?". International Journal of Health Services. 34 (3): 381–414. doi:10.2190/G8F1-01FL-MEDW-JVG1. ISSN 0020-7314. PMID 15346677. S2CID 155766595.
- Wade, Robert H. (2023). "Order and disorder in global governance: Western dominance, Western discontent, and structural reform". Development and Change. 54 (5): 1096–1123.
- Wade, Robert H. (2025). "China as leading innovator, and as challenger to US hegemony?". Review of Keynesian Economics. 13 (4): 519–535.
- Wade, Robert H.; Starrs, Sean Kenji (2026). "No end in sight for global capitalism: the sinews of US structural power in the twenty first century". The Japanese Political Economy. 52 (2).
