= Alice Amsden =

American political economist (1943–2012)

- Born: Alice Hoffenberg Amsden; June 27, 1943; Brooklyn, New York
- Died: March 14, 2012 (aged 68); Cambridge, Massachusetts
- Occupation: Political economist

Academic background
- Education: Cornell University (B.A., 1965); London School of Economics (Ph.D., 1971)

Academic work
- Discipline: Development economics
- Sub-discipline: Political economy
- School or tradition: Heterodox economics
- Institutions: UCLA; Columbia University; Harvard Business School; The New School; Massachusetts Institute of Technology (1994–2012)
- Main interests: Developmental states; late-industrializing economies; industrial policy

Alice Hoffenberg Amsden (June 27, 1943 – March 14, 2012) was a political economist and scholar of state-led economic development. For the last two decades of her career, she was the Barton L. Weller Professor of Political Economy at the Massachusetts Institute of Technology.

Amsden was known best for her work on the developmental state, which argued that state-led industrialization was a viable alternative to the market-oriented industrialization of North America and Europe. Her scholarship focused on the catch-up of late-industrializing economies, particularly the "Asian Tigers." Amsden found their growth was accomplished through government intervention that established price control and import substitution policies, promoted organizational learning, and arranged "reciprocal control mechanisms" between states and private firms. Her work is viewed as a rebuttal of the Washington Consensus and neoclassical economic theories that sought to restrain state intervention in the developmental process.

== Life and career ==
Born in New York City, Amsden received her undergraduate degree from Cornell University and her PhD from the London School of Economics. Amsden began her career as an economist at the Organisation for Economic Co-operation and Development (OECD) and taught at University of California, Los Angeles, Barnard College at Columbia University, Harvard Business School and The New School before being appointed professor at MIT in 1994. She remained in MIT's Department of Urban Studies and Planning until her death in 2012.

In addition to teaching and writing, she was a consultant to the World Bank, OECD and various organizations within the United Nations. In 2002, she was awarded the Leontief Prize by the Global Development and Environment Institute and was named one of the top 50 visionaries by Scientific American for her premise that one-size-fits-all economic policies are ill-suited for poor countries looking to become industrialized. In 2009, she was appointed by the United Nations secretary-general to a 3-year seat on the U.N. Committee on Development Policy, a subsidiary of the U.N. Economic and Social Council. The 24-member committee provides inputs and independent advice to the council on emerging cross-sectoral development issues and on international cooperation for development.

Amsden wrote several books about the industrialization of developing countries. Her work emphasized the importance of the state as a facilitator and guide of economic development. She also saw knowledge as a crucial determinant of economic growth. Her books include Asia's Next Giant: South Korea and Late Industrialisation and The Rise of the Rest. In the former she concentrated on the development of South Korea and in the latter she compared the experiences of several developing countries—mostly East Asian and Latin American countries.

In 2012, Amsden died suddenly at her home in Cambridge at the age of 68.

== Books ==
In addition to numerous journal articles, Amsden published:

- The Role of Elites in Economic Development, Oxford University Press, 2012, (with Alisa Di Caprio and James A. Robinson). ISBN 9780198716433
- Escape from Empire: The Developing World's Journey through Heaven and Hell, MIT Press, 2007. ISBN 9780262513159
- Beyond Late Development: Taiwan's Upgrading Policies, MIT Press, 2003, (with Wan Wen Chu).
- The Rise of "The Rest": Challenges to the West From Late-Industrializing Economies, Oxford University Press, 2001.
- The Market Meets Its Match: Restructuring the Economies of Eastern Europe, Harvard University Press, 1994 (with Jacek Kochanowicz and Lance Taylor). ISBN 9780674549845
- Asia's Next Giant: South Korea and Late Industrialization, Oxford University Press, 1989. Awarded "Best Book in Political Economy," American Political Science Association, 1992. ISBN 9780195076035
